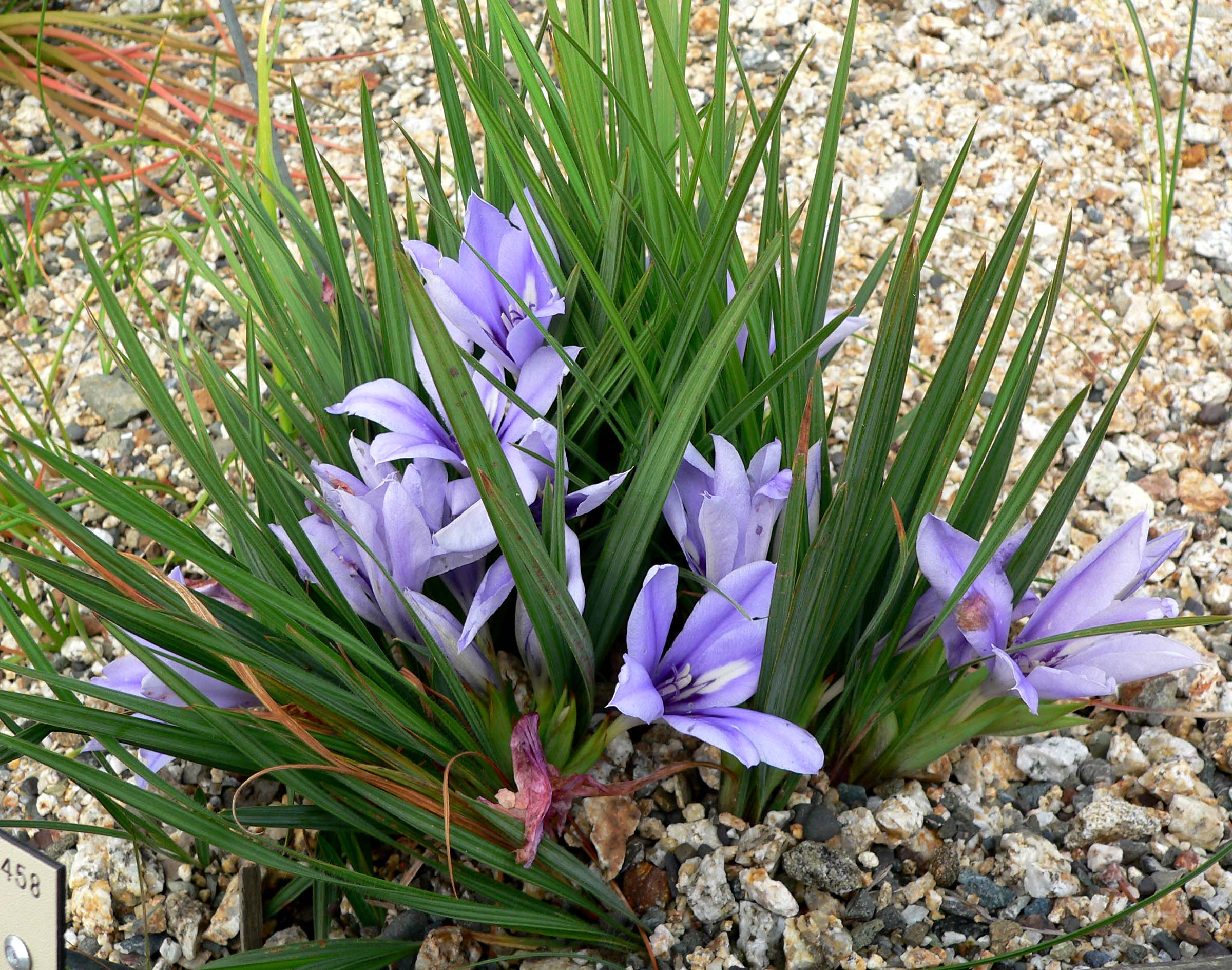
- Babiana sambucina subsp. sambucina

Scientific classification
- Kingdom: Plantae
- Clade: Tracheophytes
- Clade: Angiosperms
- Clade: Monocots
- Order: Asparagales
- Family: Iridaceae
- Subfamily: Crocoideae
- Tribe: Croceae
- Genus: Babiana; Ker Gawl.

Type species
- Babiana plicata Ker Gawler

Synonyms
- Acaste Salisb. not validly published; Anaclanthe N.E.Br.; Antholyza L.

= Babiana =

Genus of flowering plants

Babiana (/ˌbæbiˈænə/) is a genus of geophytes in the family Iridaceae with 93 recognized species as of March 2022. The leaves consist of a stalk and a blade that are at an angle to each other. The leaf blades are entire, laterally flattened and pleated, and often hairy. Each individual flower is subtended by two hairy or smooth bracts that are green in most species. The outer bract is often the largest of the two. In most species the bracts have a dry, brown tip, but in a few species it is entirely green or entirely dry when flowering or the outer bract is translucent and has a papery texture. The inner bract (between the flower and the stem) is forked or split all the way to its base. Each flower is without a pedicel, with six tepals that are merged at their base into a tube and form a perianth that is mirror-symmetrical in most species, with three anthers implanted where the perianth tube widens and that are, in almost every species, clustered at one side of the style. The style has three branches that widen towards the tip and the ovary is inferior. Flowers occur in almost every conceivable colour, many have markings on some of the tepals, and few star-symmetrical flowers have a centre that strongly contrasts with the free part of the perianth. The majority of these species are endemic to the west and southwest of South Africa, and southwestern Namibia, but one species occurs elsewhere in Namibia and South Africa and another species can be found in Botswana, Namibia, South Africa, Zambia and Zimbabwe. The genus name is derived from the Dutch word baviaan, referring to the Chacma baboon, Papio ursinus, that consumes the corms of plants in the genus. The genus is called bobbejaantjie in Afrikaans, meaning small baboon.

== Description ==
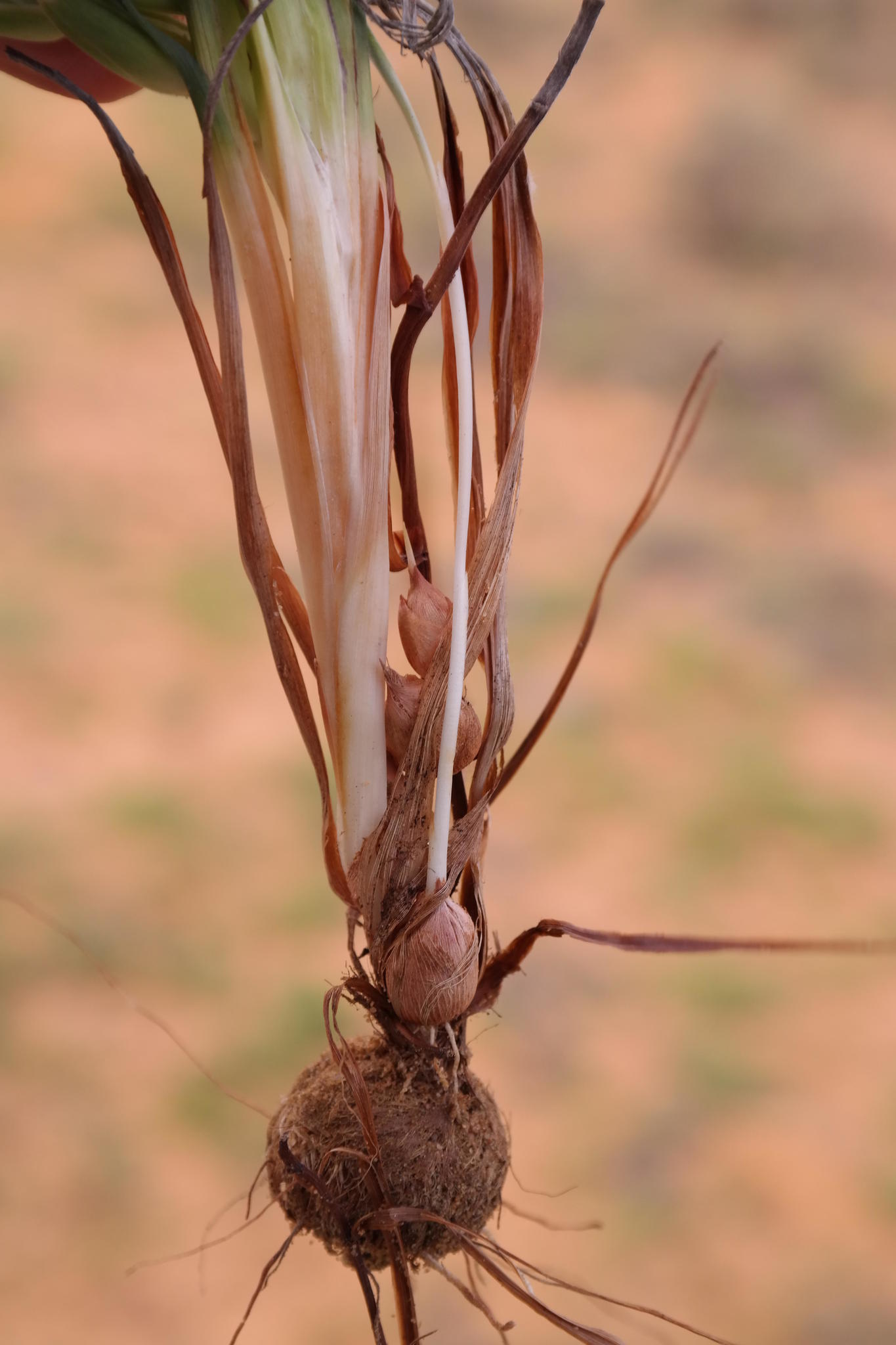
underground parts of Babiana grandiflora showing corms and roots, and lack of a fibrous collar

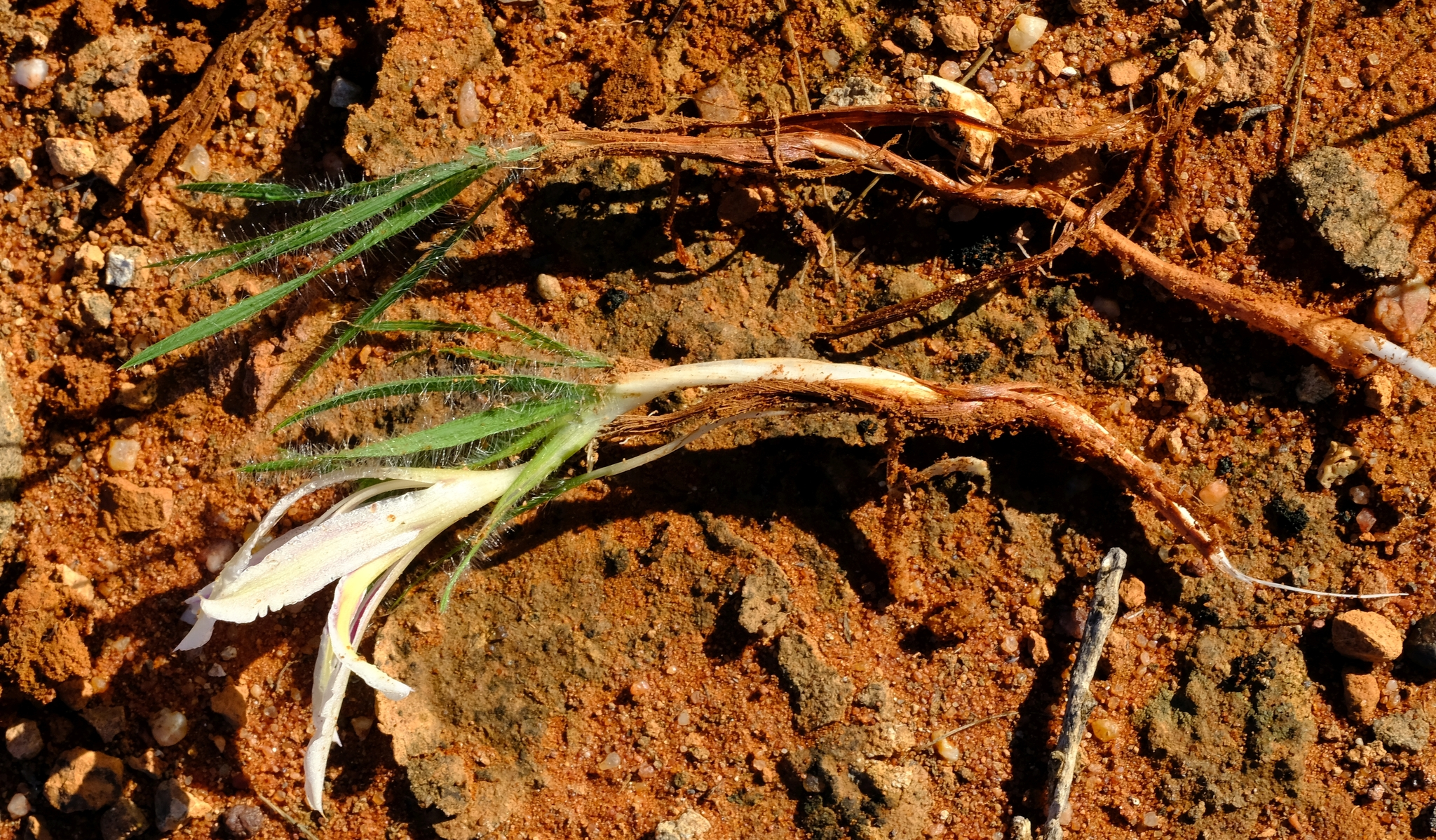
the fibrous collar surrounding the underground stems of Babiana minuta

Bobbejaantjies are perennial geophytes that appear seasonally above the ground with leaves and flowers. The leaves and stems are shed in anticipation of the dry and hot summer, when the plants survive with their corms. The roots that appear from the base of the corm are approximately the same diameter along their length and do not branch. The corms are enveloped in a multi-layered fibrous tunic that sometimes has a netted appearance. From the corm's top emerges a stem that is circular in cross section, either or not branching, mostly hairy or rough but sometimes smooth, and that may be entirely subterranean or appear above the ground. The base of the stem is usually surrounded by a collar consisting of several fibrous layers, but this collar is poorly developed in Babiana grandiflora, B. nana and B. petiolata.

=== Leaves ===
The leaves consist of a narrow sheath partially enclosing the sheaths of other leaves and the stem, and a laterally compressed blade with a right and left surface, rather than an upper and lower surface. The axils of the sheath and blade are at a distinct angle with each other. The leaf blades of most species of Babiana are pleated, meaning that the surfaces of the leaf abruptly and repetitively change angle at the location of one of the veins. Such so-called plicate leaves are unusual in the subfamily Crocoidae. The leaves are usually hairy and the hairs may vary from short hairs hard to the touch or velvety, to long and soft. Several species have almost hairless leaves, but even then, the leaf margins or sheaths are mostly hairy. The leaves of seedlings of all Babiana species are always softly hairy. Leaf blade morphology is moderately variable. There are some species with an almost plane leaf blade surface, in some species the leaf blade is twisted or more or less coiled, or the margins may undulate. In B. cuneata, B. flabellifolia, B. lanata and B. praemorsa the leaf tip consists of several irregular teeth and appears to have been bitten off by grazing animals. B. brachystachys has leaf blades that are oval in section with a few strong longitudinal grooves. The angle between the sheath and the leaf blades is particularly large in some species, including B. lewisiana, B. salteri and B. tritonioides, where the blade is almost at a right angles to the sheaths and extends from the plant almost horizontally. The blades of the leaves in Babiana do not have a central vein, a character shared with other Iridaceae genera that also have pleated leaves, such as Crocosmia. At each pleat, a larger vein is located at the outer angle, while a much smaller vein is located at the inside of the fold. In Crocoidea with plane leaves, both vascular bundles are of comparable size. All hairs consist of a single string of cells (uniseriate hairs), and are mostly concentrated along the veins or the margins. Along the entire leaf margin is a vascular bundle that is protected by a hard tissue (sclerenchyma). The epidermal cells along the margin are hardly different from those covering the rest of the blade. This is unlike several other genera in the Crocoidae subfamily that neither have a marginal vein nor a sclerenchyma strand, while the epidermal cells along the margin are columnar with thickened radial walls.

=== Stems ===
The stems are circular in cross-section and usually covered in short or velvety uniseriate hairs. Although the stem of B. spiralis is covered in velvety hairs, most species of section Antholyzoides lack hair or virtually so. The stem in Babiana species is often branched, in some species repeatedly so and mostly upright, but strongly inclined or even horizontal in B. auriculata and B. pilosa. The stems may be entirely or largely underground in the majority of the species of section Teretifolieae, and also in B. ambigua and B. scabrifolia (section Babiana). Usually however, the spike is born close to or slightly above the surface. Babiana ringens is a remarkable species in which the main axis is sterile and all flowers occur on one or more short side branches (see B. ringens australis in the Species overview). The flower buds are arranged in two parallel rows along the inflorescence stem, but when the flowers open, the stem may have twisted and the flowers may appear to be arranged almost spirally or are oriented all in the same direction. In any species, the number of flower buds may differ considerably between inflorescences, but some species typically have more than others. This may partly reflect the size of the plants. B. minuta and B. pauciflora both consistently have only few flower buds. Each flower is subtended by two bracts, the outer bract usually larger and clasping the inner bract. Both bracts are typically leafy in texture and green in colour except for the tip that is usually dry. Sometimes the bracts are russet in colour. In B. secunda, the bracts are entirely rusty and dry, and in the series Scariosae of section Babiana the bracts are translucent and dry-membranous. The bracts are usually velvety, soft or sometimes silky hairy on their outer surface, but in section Antholyzoides often hairless. The inner bracts may be forked at the tips sometimes as deep as midlength, or may be divided almost or entirely to the base, the two halves sometimes connected by a transparent dry membrane. Such divided inner bracts are a common character of the species in the section Babiana, and are likely derived. In the species of the section Antholyzoides the bracts are relatively short and the firm, mostly smooth inner bracts are split to about midlength and two fairly dominant ribs divide the membranous tissue.

=== Flowers ===
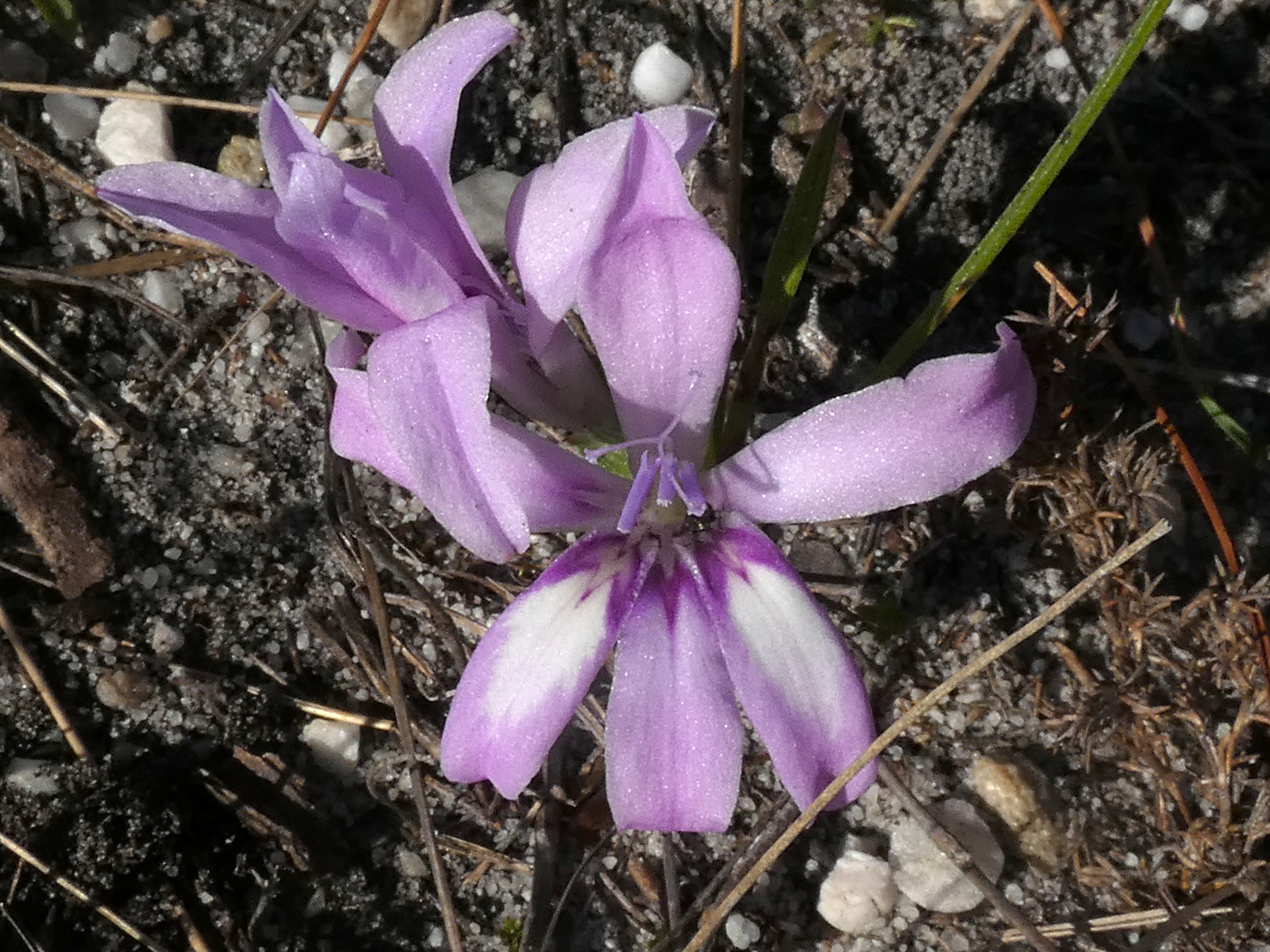
B. ambigua showing a zygomorphic perianth with 6 tepals, 3 anthers and 3 style branches

The shapes and colour patterns of the flowers vary across species and are adapted to specific pollinators. As in the last common ancestor of all Babiana species, the flowers of most extant species are mirror symmetrical with an upper and lower lip, and three parallel curved stamens in the upper lip. B. angustifolia, B. inclinata, B. rubrocyanea and B. secunda have inverted flowers. Although the corolla is radially symmetric in B. rubrocyanea, the stamens are still parallel and crowded at one side of the flower. Several other species also have star symmetrical flowers with the anthers crowded or not. B. pigmea and B. radiata, two species that are not related to B. rubrocyanea also have star symmetrical flowers, which must have been an independent development. The tepals are approximately of equal length in most species, but in species with a zygomorphic perianth the dorsal tepal is wider and arched over the three stamens, so forming the upper lip, while the three lower tepals form the lower lip, a landing stage for pollinators. The lower tepals are often joint to the upper lateral tepals at their base, creating a more pronounced landing stage. The dorsal tepal in the flowers of B. ringens and B. hirsuta is very much longer than the other tepals, and their edges curve inwards to loosely enclose the filaments. In the species assigned to the section Antholyzoides, initially the dorsal tepal is hood-shaped but it becomes erect or recurved in the older flower. The dorsal and usually also the other tepals are also more or less clawed in this section. Towards its base, the perianth is entire. It may be funnel-shaped with a narrow cylindrical lower part, or the tube may be approximately cylindrical over its entire length (in B. brachystachys and B. tubulosa), but it may also expand abruptly forming a wide cylindrical throat (in B. hirsuta and B. ringens). The length of the perianth tube varies strongly between species, from approximately 10 mm (0.39 in) to over 80 mm (3.1 in). The length of the floral tube often reflects the length of the mouth parts of the pollinator. However, in Babiana the floral tube is sometimes entirely blocked by the style. A blocked floral tube most commonly occurs in species that have a their stems largely underground. The solid tube serves as if it is a pedicel, so that the flowers are raised above the leaves. Typically, part of the floral tube is completely closed in species with actinomorphic flowers. These species are mostly pollinated by monkey beetles. The floral tubes in these species may be long, in some forms of B. villosa even up to 35 mm (1.4 in). The flowers of these species hardly produce any nectar. The last common ancestor of all Babiana species most likely had blue or violet flowers, still the most common colours in the extant species, with the lower laterals bearing spear- or lozenge-shaped, white or cream-coloured markings strongly contrasting with a dark blue, purple or red outline. In some species the lower central tepal is marked in the same way. A few species, in particular B. noctiflora, B. odorata, B. pygmaea, B. spathacea, B. tubulosa, B. unguiculata and B. virginea flowers are white, cream-coloured or pale yellow. The flowers of B. brachystachys are white on the inside but pink on the reverse. Few other species have magenta flowers, including B. blanda, B. purpurea and B. rubella. The aptly named B. carminea has carmine-coloured flowers. Scarlet flowers can be found in B. hirsuta, B. ringens and a form of B. villosa, pinkish red in B. avicularis. B. regia and B. rubrocyanea have an actinomorphic dark blue perianth around a red heart divided by a thin white line. The flower colour of B. nervosa differs considerably between populations from white to cream-coloured, pink, mauve or blue, and within most populations the flower colour is uniform but for the weakly contrasting markings on the lower tepals. The stamens are implanted where the tube widens. The filaments are slender and extending outside the mouth of the flower. B. leipoldtii and B. villosula however have actinomorphic flowers in which the stamens do not reach beyond the upper half of the tube. In B. ringens, B. hirsuta and B. avicularis on the other hand, the anthers are well-exerted, reaching beyond the tip of the dorsal tepal that is loosely embracing the filaments.

In most species, the organs containing the pollen (or thecae) are pale mauve, cream-coloured or yellow. Usually the anthers are oblong to linear with two parallel thecae. In B. melanops, B. patersoniae, B. purpurea, B. nervosa and B. villosa the anthers are turquoise or blackish blue, with black or dark to pale blue pollen, and the connective tissue between both thecae is wider at the anther base, making the anthers lance- to arrow-shaped, with the thecae at the edges. A few other species including B. patersoniae have normally shaped anthers but share the dark anther colour. In most species, the stamens are clustered parallel below the dorsal tepal. In B. geniculata however, the anthers diverge from each other even though the filaments are parallel over most of their lengths. Yet another exception is found in B. sinuata that has the unique feature in the Iridaceae of merged anthers. Typically for pollen within the Crocoidae subfamily, the ellipsoid grains have a perforated exine layer, and one elliptical opening (or aperture) that is sealed by a lid (or operculum) adorned with two bands.

In the species assigned to the section Antholyzoides the ovary is hairless. This is also true for most species in the section Teretifoliae, with the exception of B. cedarbergensis, B. geniculata, B. pygmaea and some specimens of B. vanzijliae that have ovaries that are hairy in the upper half or on the ribs. The ovary is hairy throughout or at least above the base in most species assigned to the section Babiana, but not in the species of the series Patulae, Scariosae and Secundae. In B. ambigua, the ribs on the ovary are very minutely hairy. B. bainesii, B. hypogaea, B. cuneata and B. sambucina the ovary is on a short stalk (or gynophore). The bracts that are subtending each flower grow between the gynophore (if present) and the base of the ovary, like in all other Crocoidae. The style branches in three slender arms at the level of the anthers, but the point of division differs between species. In species assigned to the section Antholyzoides, the undivided part reaches the tip of the anthers or is even longer, and this is also true for B. ambigua, B. avicularis, B. hirsuta, B. purpurea and B. ringens. The style branches are widened and often split in two lobes at the tips. When flowers first open, the widened parts of the style are folded along the midline (or conduplicate) only to fully expand when the pollen has been shed, so avoiding selfing through protandry. In B. purpurea and B. rubrocyanea, the style branches are much more widened at their tip as in other species. Short styles that divide at or below the anther base occur in some species including B. fragans, B. tubaeformis, the B. nervosa-B. villosa group, and several others. The character mostly occurs in species that are pollinated by monkey beetles or beetles and bees. In B. ecklonii there is a considerable variation in style length within the same population. The seed capsules are spherical to egg-shaped, slightly three-lobed and with firm, cartilaginous walls that often show some bumps from the seeds inside. The seeds are mostly 3–4 mm (0.12–0.16 in) in diameter, but in B. ecklonii the seed only measures about 2.5 mm (0.098 in) and B. bainsii has seeds of about 5 mm (0.20 in). The seeds are blackish to dark brown, glossy with an uneven wrinkled surface and approximately pear-shaped. The neck of the seed only consists of the crinkled seed coat, while the belly is filled with a globular seed core.

=== Chromosomes ===
All 24 species of Babiana that have been analysed have seven sets of two homologous chromosomes (2n=14), mostly consisting of two long and five short, in a few species one long and six short chromosomes. The only other genus in the Crocoideae with 14 chromosomes is the unrelated genus Zygotritonia from tropical Africa.

== Taxonomy ==
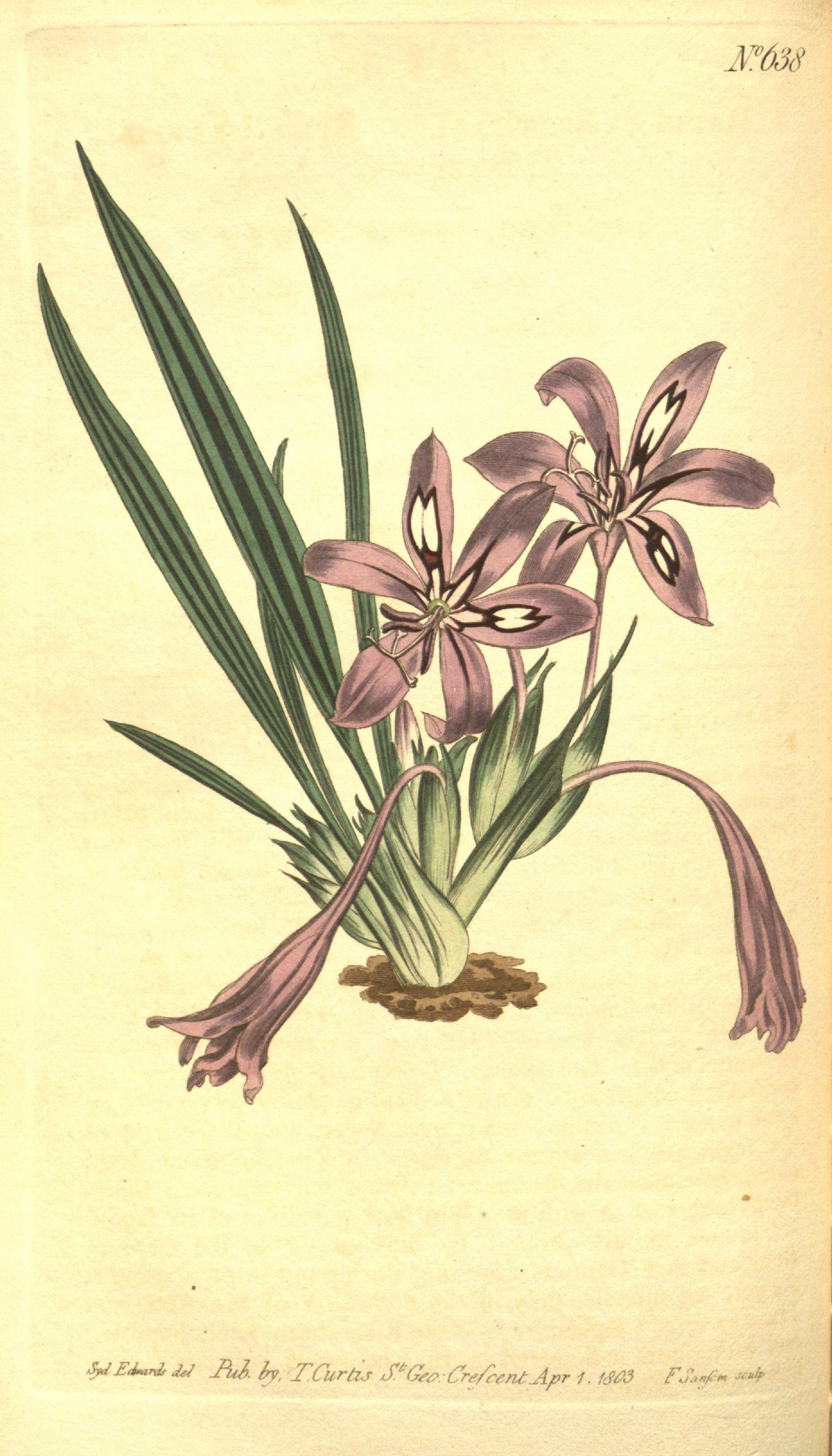
Babiana spathacea published in Curtis's Botanical Magazine of 1803

The first bobbejaantjie to be scientifically described received the name Antholyza ringens (now Babiana ringens) from Carl Linnaeus in 1753, the year that has been formally accepted as the introduction of binomial nomenclature. Dutch botanist Nicolaas Laurens Burman described two more species as Ixia pygmaea and I. tubulosa (now B. pygmaea and B. tubulosa respectively) in 1768. In 1781, Carl Linnaeus the Younger described two species as Antholyza plicata and Gladiolus spathaceus (now B. hirsuta and B. spathacea respectively), adding in 1782 Gladiolus tubiflorus (currently B. tubiflora). Jean-Baptiste Lamarck described in 1788 Gladiolus nervosus (now B. nervosa, which was long known as B. stricta). The Scottish botanist William Aiton described Ixia villosa (now B. villosa) in 1789. Lamarck described a further species of bobbejaantjie in 1791, as Gladiolus pubescens (currently B. pubescens). Nikolaus Joseph von Jacquin named Gladiolus striatus, G. mucronatus and Ixia rubrocyanea (now B. mucronata, B. striata and B. rubrocyanea respectively) in 1794. Johann Friedrich Gmelin recognised Ixia villosula (now B. villosula) in 1896. Jacquin described G. fragans and G. sambucinus (now B. fragans and B. sambucina respectively) in 1797. Carl Peter Thunberg, sometimes called the father of South African botany, described in 1800 Gladiolus secundus (now B. secunda). In 1801, the English botanist, botanical artist and engraver Henry Cranke Andrews described Gladiolus nanus (now B. nana).

John Bellenden Ker Gawler in 1802 proposed to use the genus name Babiana for the species of bobbejaantjie. Ker Gawler described B. purpurea in 1807. Richard Anthony Salisbury proposed the name Acaste for the genus in 1812. In 1817, Johann Jacob Roemer and Josef August Schultes added Gladiolus ambiguus (now B. ambigua). William John Burchell distinguished B. hypogaea in 1824. In 1827, Robert Sweet named B. angustifolia. In 1867 Friedrich Wilhelm Klatt described Antholyza fimbriata (now B. fimbriata) and also validly published the name B. flabellifolia, based on earlier work of William Henry Harvey. John Gilbert Baker described B. bainesii, B. dregei and Acidanthera brachystachys (now B. brachystachys) in 1876. In 1882, Klatt describes B. ecklonii, B. lineolata and also validly published the name B. scabrifolia based on work by Joachim Brehm. Baker added B. namaquensis and B. spiralis in 1892. Rudolf Schlechter added B. stenomera in 1899. South African botanist Louisa Bolus assigned the name B. vanzijliae in 1925 and B. latifolia in 1927. In 1931, Bolus described B. patersoniae and Kurt Dinter added B. longicollis. Bolus described B. framesii, B. odorata and B. macrantha var. blanda (now B. blanda) in 1932. Nicholas Edward Brown recognised B. patula that same year and suggested a new name for the genus, Anaclanthe. South African botanist Gwendoline Joyce Lewis published in 1959 an extensive revision of the genus Babiana. Therein she distinguished 61 species including the newly described B. attenuata, B. auriculata, B. cedarbergensis, B. confusa, B. crispa, B. curviscapa, B. foliosa, B. fourcadei, B. geniculata, B. horizontalis, B. leipoldtii, B. lobata, B. longibracteata (now B. sambucina subsp. longibracteata), B. minuta, B. montana, B. mucronata var. minor (now B. mucronata subsp. minor), B. pauciflora, B. pilosa, B. salteri, B. sambucina var. unguiculata (now B. rigidifolia), B. scariosa, B. sinuata, B. striata var. planifolia (now B. planifolia), B. stricta var. grandiflora and var. regia (now B. tubaeformis and B. regia respectively), B. torta, B. tritonioides, and B. unguiculata. In 1970, Bertil Nordenstam named B. lewisiana in her honor. Peter Goldblatt described in 1979 B. virginea. With John Charles Manning he described B. cuneata and B. praemorsa in 2004. In 2007 the genus was again revised, now by Goldblatt and Manning, and they newly described B. arenicola, B. carminea, B. cinnamomea, B. engysiphon, B. gariepensis, B. grandiflora, B. inclinata, B. karooica, B. lanata, B. lapeirousioides, B. melanops, B. noctiflora, B. papyracea, B. petiolata, B. radiata, B. rubella, B. tanquana, and B. toximontana. These same authors recognised in 2008 B. symmetrantha and B. virescens, followed by B. avicularis, B. ringens subsp. australis and B. teretifolia in 2010, and B. rivulicola in 2012.

The type species of the genus Antholyza is Antholyza cunonia, a species that is currently included in Gladiolus. This means that the name Antholyza is not available for the species of bobbejaantjie. Acaste and Anaclanthe are later synonyms of Babiana.

=== Classification ===
The genus Babiana is part of the Iridaceae family, Crocoidae subfamily. Manning and Goldblatt recognised three sections, and several subsections. The section Babiana consists of species in which the inner of the two bracts subtending each flower is split to the base or sometimes the halves are connected by a thin and transparent membrane. The bracts may either be green with a dry brown to russet-coloured tip, be completely dry and brown, or entirely of a translucent, papery consistency. The ovary in many of the species is hairy, but hairless in some. The species in the section Antholyzoides have the inner bract split only at the tip or no further than approximately half length. The bracts are short, mostly 5–15 mm (0.20–0.59 in), rarely up to 22 mm (0.87 in) long, and always green with a dry pale to russet brown tip. The tepals narrow into a claw towards the tube, particularly abruptly so in the lower tepals that have ear-like lobes. The dorsal tepal is initially hood-like, becoming erect or recurved later. The ovary is nearly always hairless. The section Teretifolieae shares the same types of bracts with the section Antholyzoides although these are mostly 16–50 mm (0.63–1.97 in) long, rarely as short as 13 mm (0.51 in). The tepals however lack claws and prominent ear-shaped lobes, and the dorsal tepal may be curved, erect or patent, but does not change shape during flowering. Often the stem is underground or rises only a little above the surface. In this section the ovary is also nearly always hairless.

=== Phylogeny ===
Comparison of homologous DNA has increased the insight in the phylogenetic relationships between genera in the subfamily Crocoidae (the genus Zygotritonia was not included in the analysis, but is presumed closely related to Lapeirousia), and between 86 of the species of Babiana (B. brachystachys, B. foliosa, B. gariepensis, B. lapeirousioides, B. longicollis, B. rivulicola and B. stenomera were not included in the analysis). The following trees represent those insights.

- subfamily Crocoidae
  - Tritoniopsis
  - - - - Lapeirousia
        - - Savannosiphon
          - Cyanixia
      - - - Micranthus
          - Thereianthus
        - - Pillansia
          - Watsonia
    - - - Gladiolus
        - Melasphaerula
      - - - Xenoscapa
          - - - Devia
              - Crocosmia
            - - Freesia
              - Anomatheca
        - - - Radinosiphon
            - - Romulea
              - - Crocus
                - - Afrocrocus
                  - Syringodea
          - - - - Dierama
                - - Ixia
                  - Tritonia
              - - Sparaxis
                - Duthiastrum
            - - Chasmanthe
              - Babiana

- genus Babiana
  - B. lobata
  - - - - - - B. bainesii
            - B. hypogaea
          - - B. horizontalis
            - B. longicollis
        - - B. symmetrantha
          - - B. dregei
            - - B. pubescens
              - - B. curviscapa
                - - B. spiralis
                  - B. attenuata
      - - - - - B. virescens
              - B. confusa
            - - B. fimbriata
              - - B. lewisiana
                - - B. striata
                  - - B. pilosa
                    - B. rubella
          - - B. carminea
            - B. cinnamomea
        - - - B. lanata
            - - B. planifolia
              - B. namaquensis
          - - - B. torta
              - - B. tubulosa
                - B. tubiflora
            - - B. tritonioides
              - - B. ringens
                - - B. avicularis
                  - - B. hirsuta
                    - B. teretifolia
    - grade B

- grade B
  - - B. spathacea
    - - B. virginea
      - - B. praemorsa
        - B. cuneata
  - - - B. grandiflora
      - B. ambigua
    - - - B. radiata
        - B. karooica
      - - - - B. purpurea
            - - B. tanquana
              - B. minuta
          - - - B. patula
              - - B. patersoniae
                - B. fourcadei
            - - B. montana
              - B. nana
        - - - - B. sambucina
              - B. flabellifolia
            - - B. rigidifolia
              - B. framesii
          - - - - B. blanda
                - B. engysiphon
              - - - B. toximontana
                  - - B. salteri
                    - B. scabrifolia
                - - B. secunda
                  - - - B. pauciflora
                      - B. mucronata mucronata
                    - - B. leipoldtii
                      - - B. latifolia
                        - B. lineolata
            - clade C

- clade C
  - - - B. auriculata
      - B. unguiculata
    - - B. crispa
      - B. ecklonii
  - - - - - B. mucronata minor
          - - B. scariosa
            - - B. vanzijliae
              - B. papyracea
        - - - B. geniculata
            - B. sinuata
          - - B. cedarbergensis
            - B. petiolata
    - - - B. odorata
        - B. regia
      - - B. villosula
        - - - - B. villosa
              - B. melanops (Tulbagh)
            - B. fragrans
          - - B. arenicola
            - - - B. pygmaea
                - B. nervosa
              - - - B. tubaeformis
                  - B. noctiflora
                - - - B. melanops (Mamre)
                    - B. inclinata
                  - - B. angustifolia
                    - B. rubrocyanea

=== Species overview ===
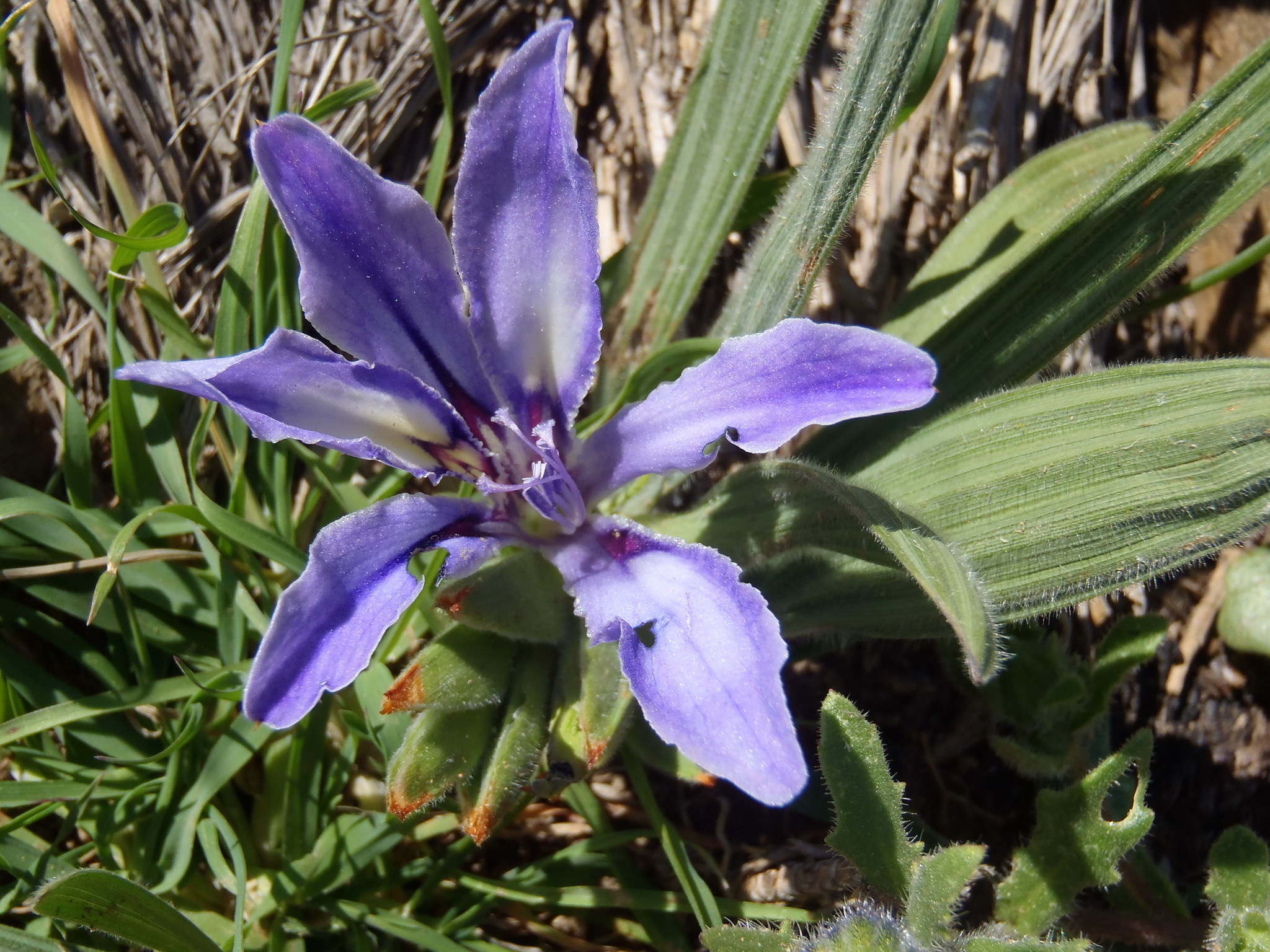
Babiana ambigua

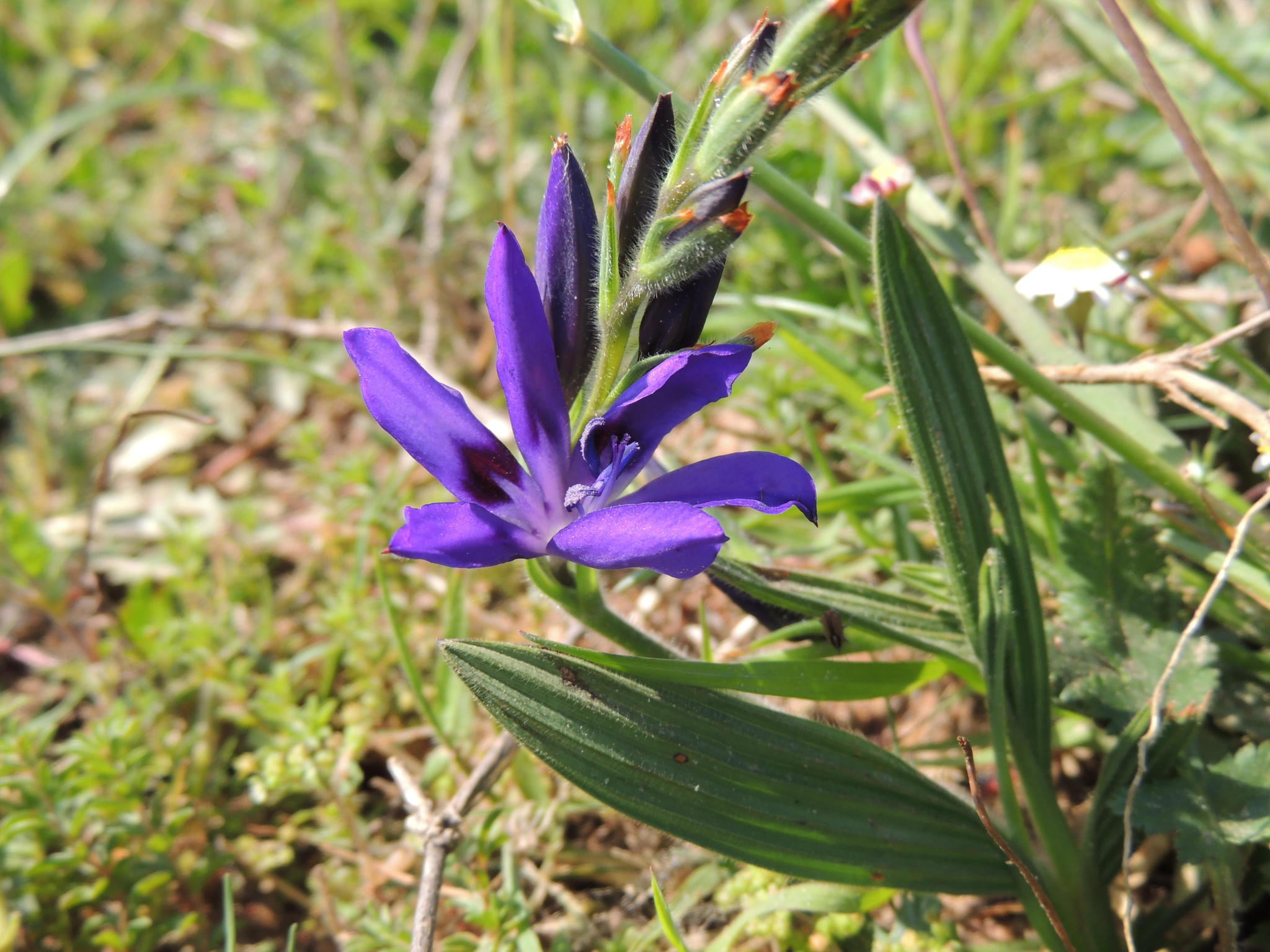
Babiana angustifolia

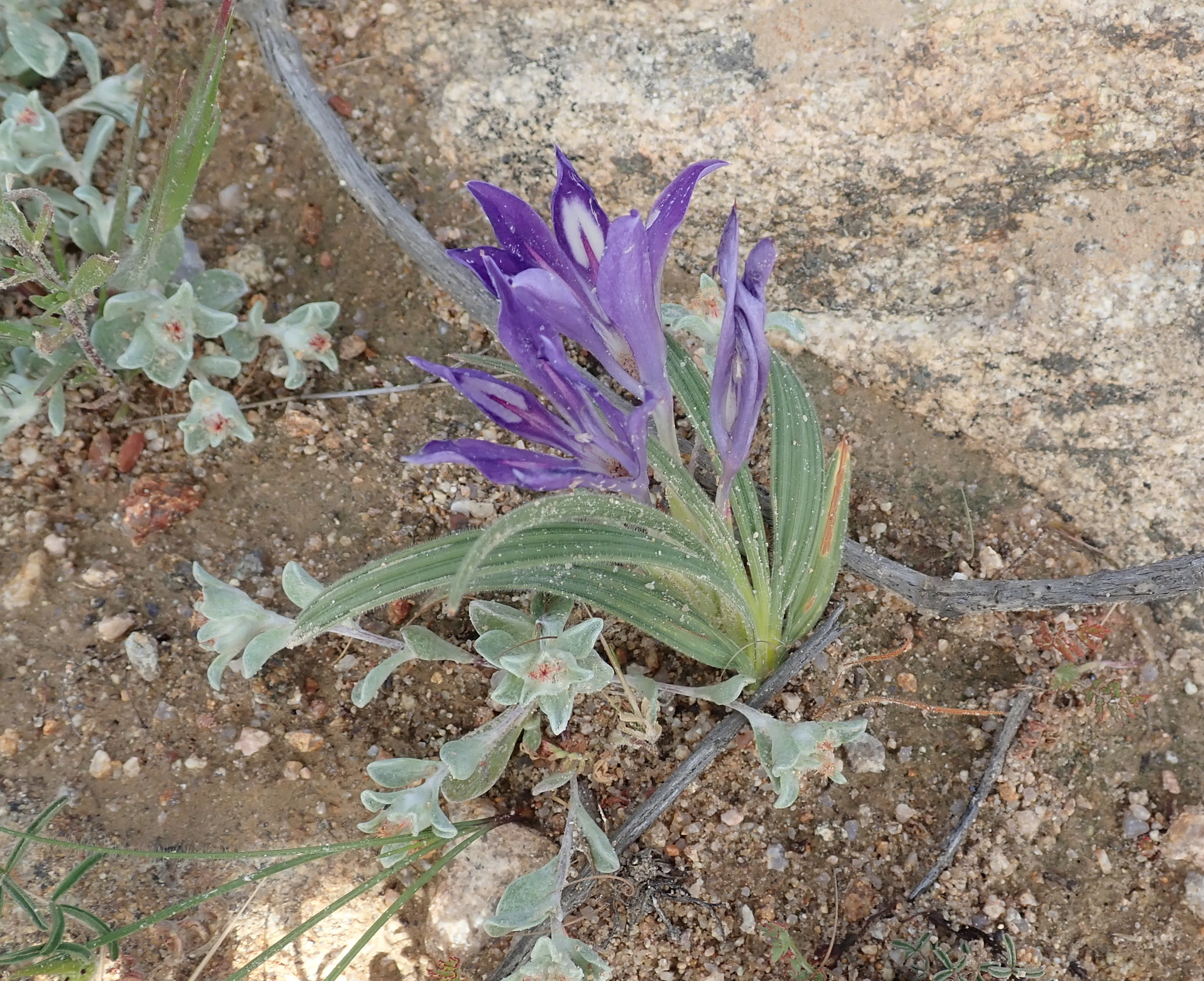
Babiana attenuata

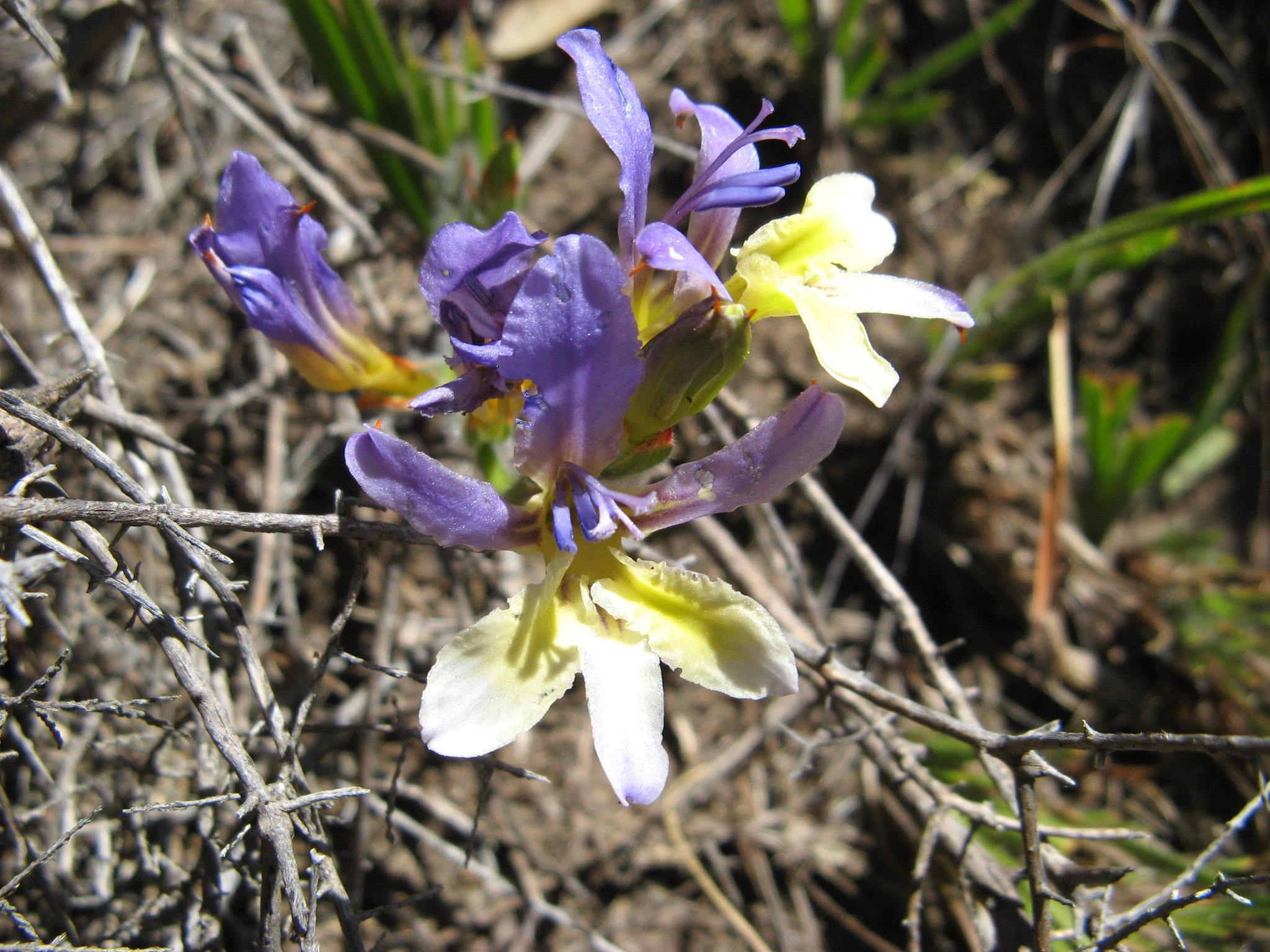
Babiana auriculata

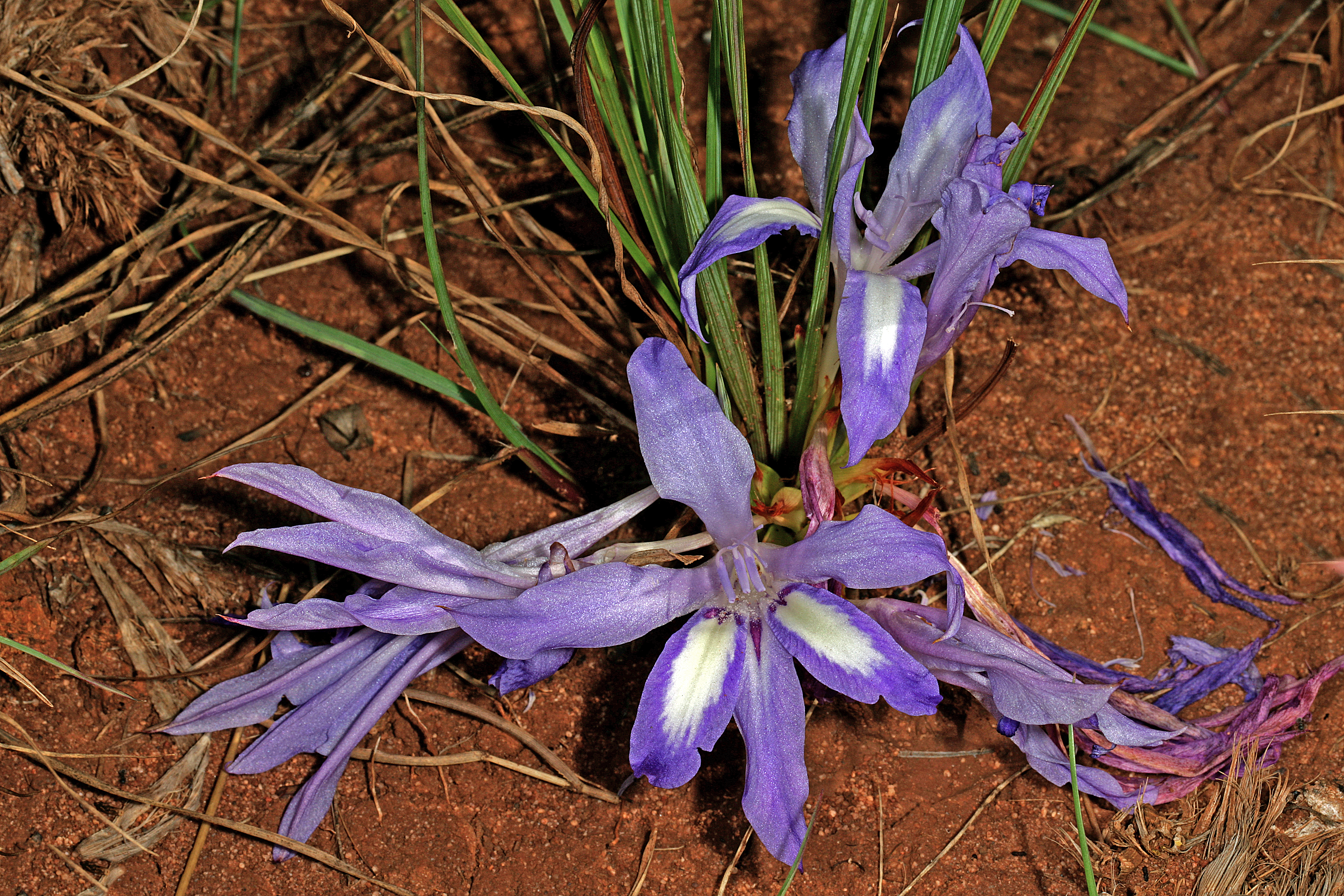
Babiana bainesii

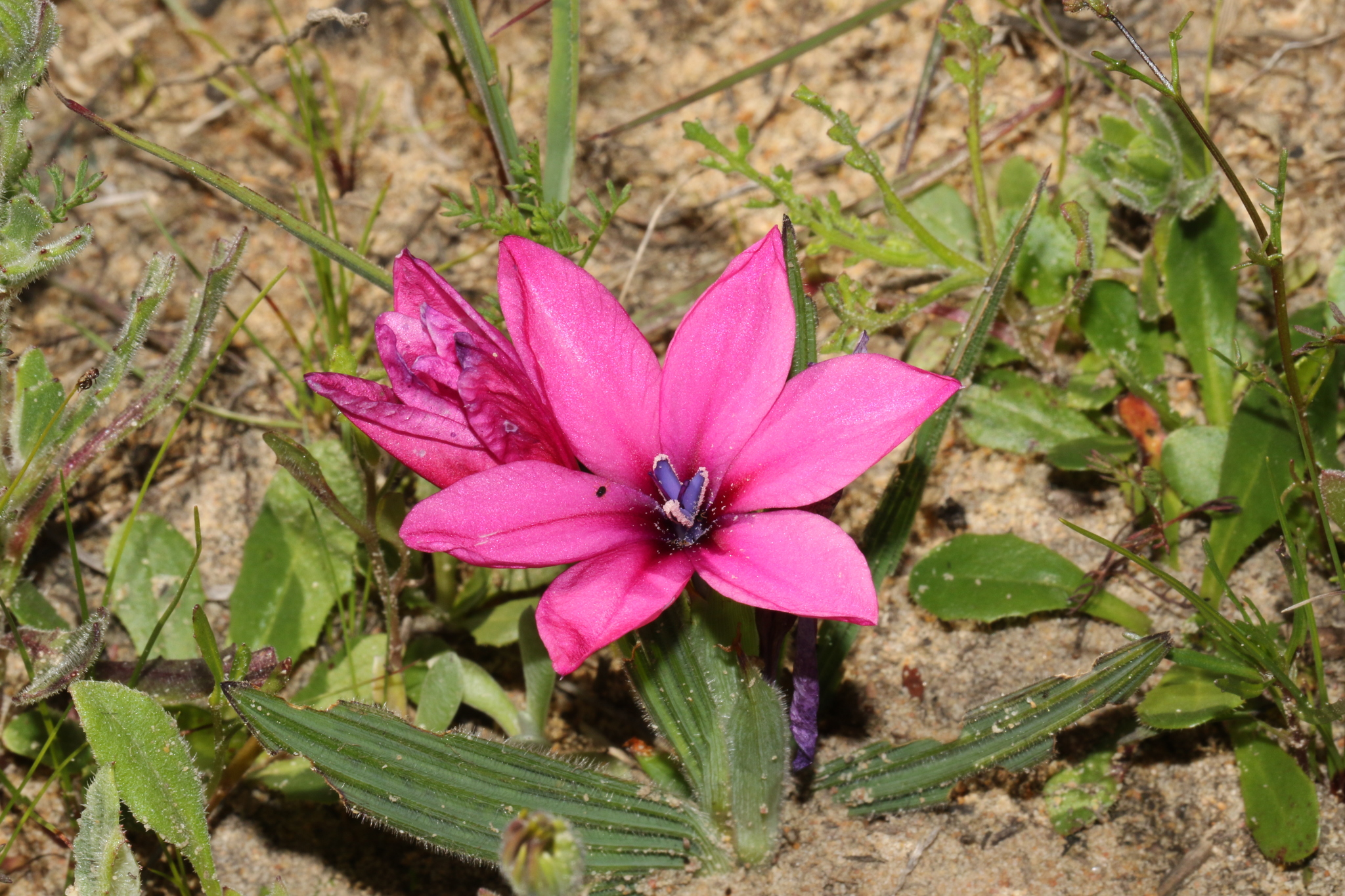
Babiana blanda

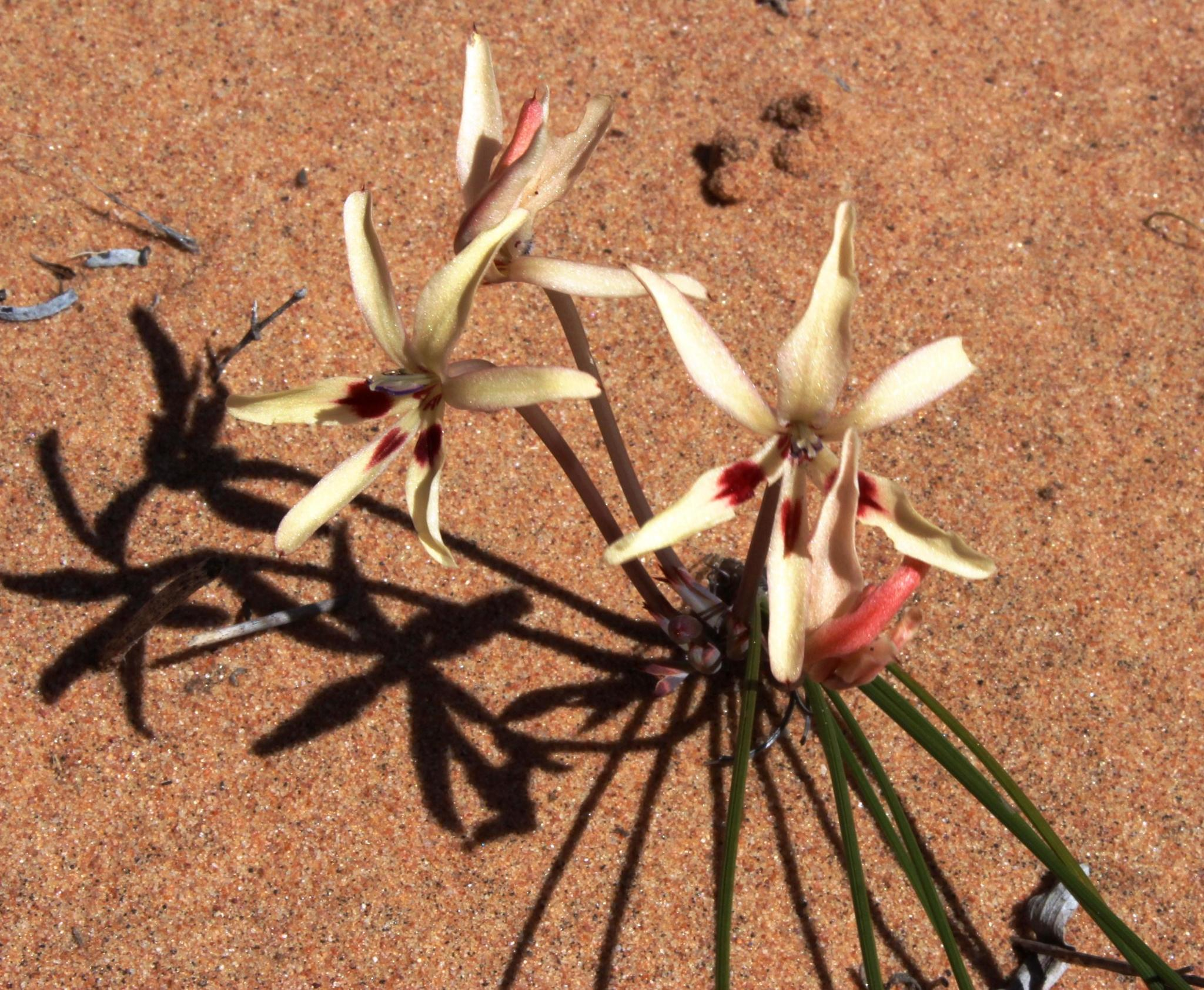
Babiana brachystachys

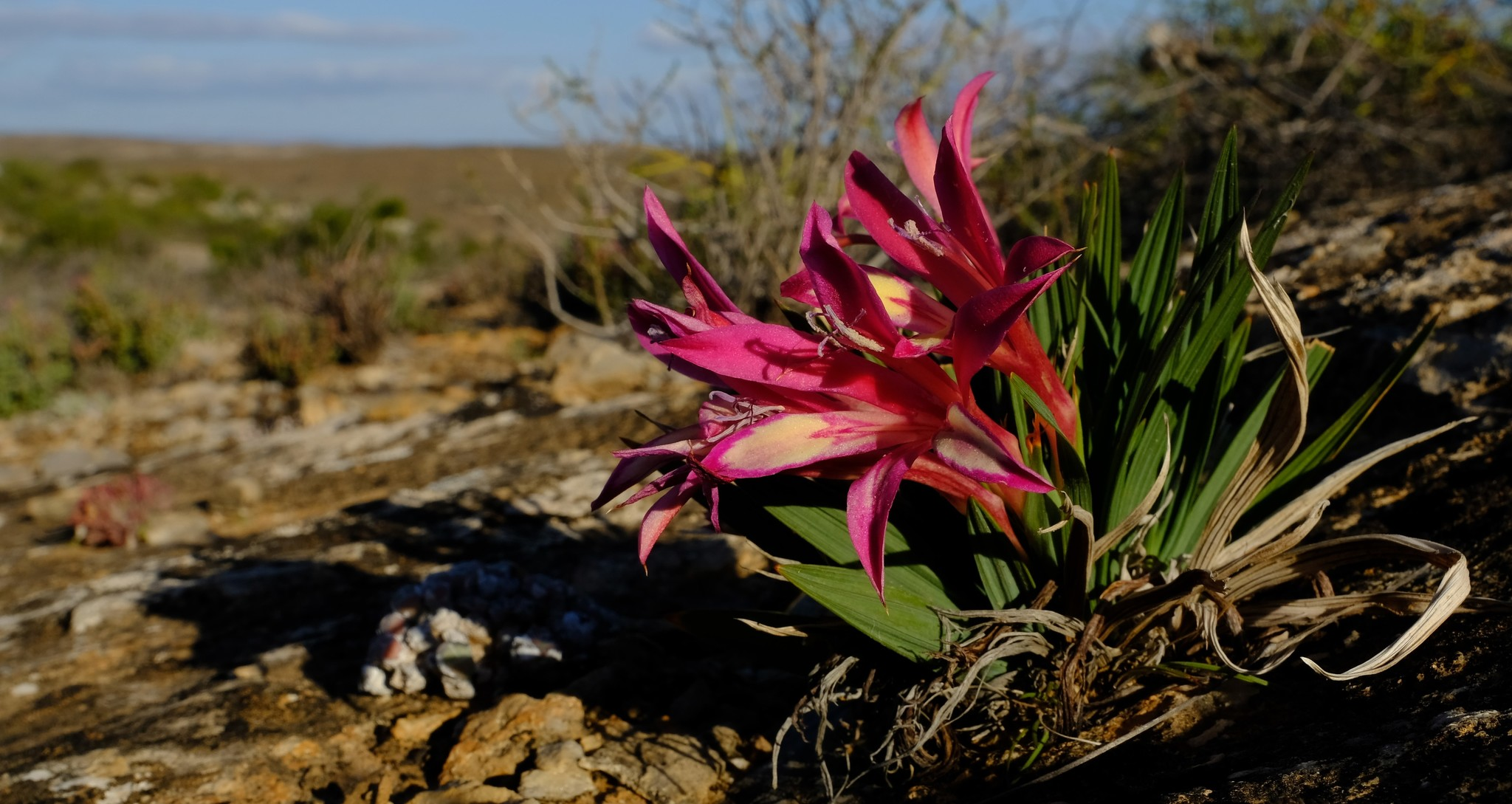
Babiana carminea

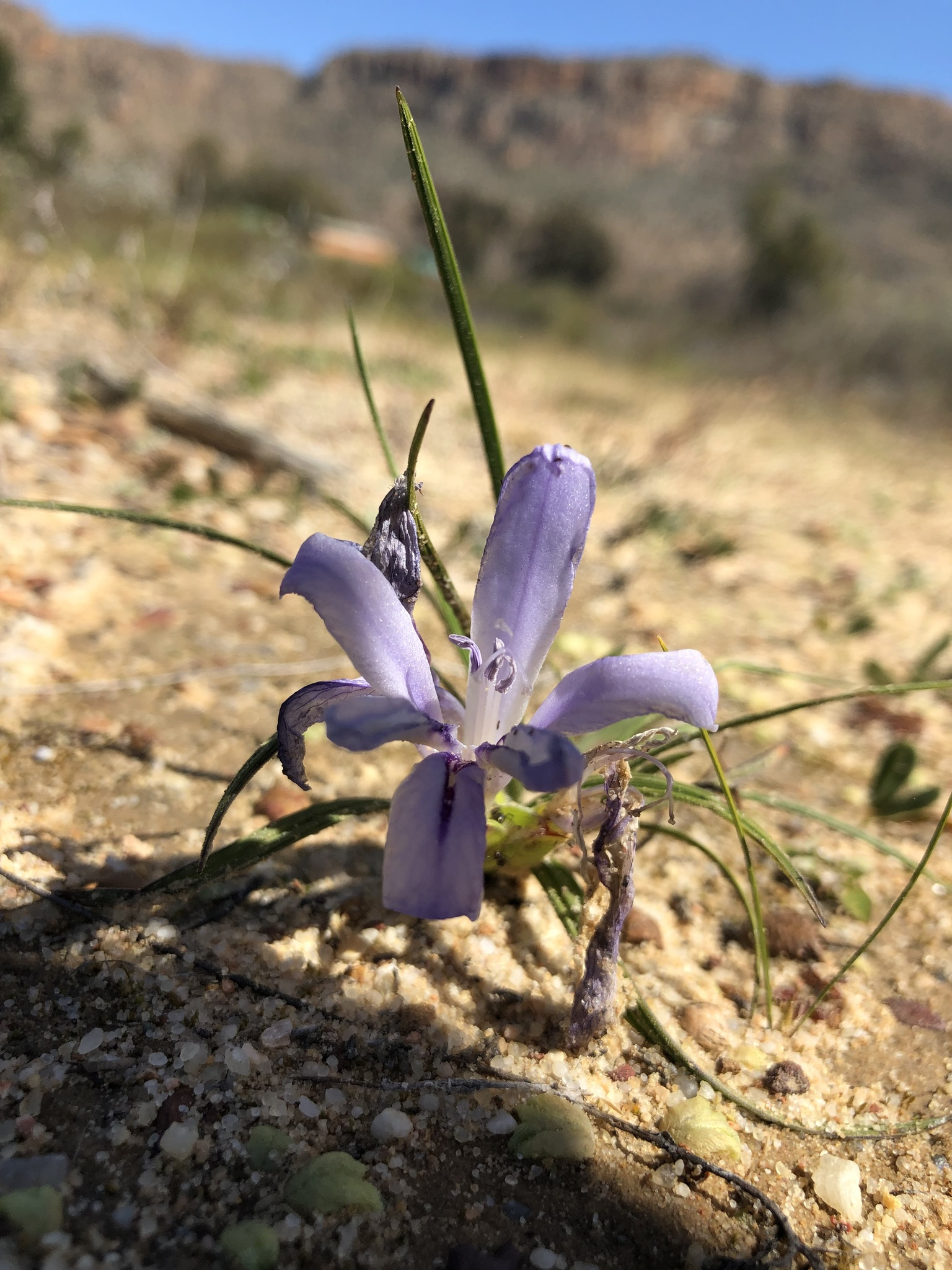
Babiana cedarbergensis

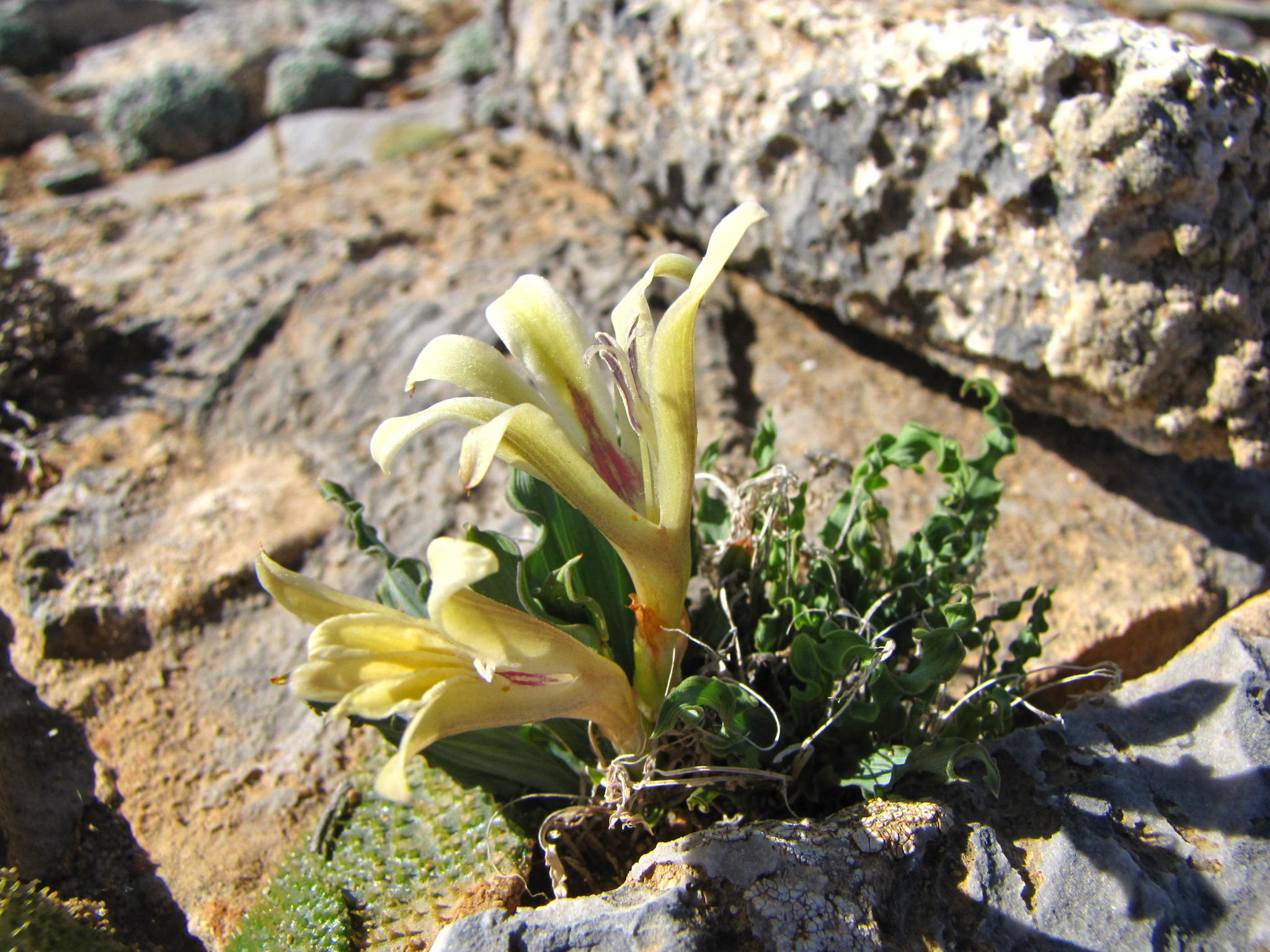
Babiana cinnamomea

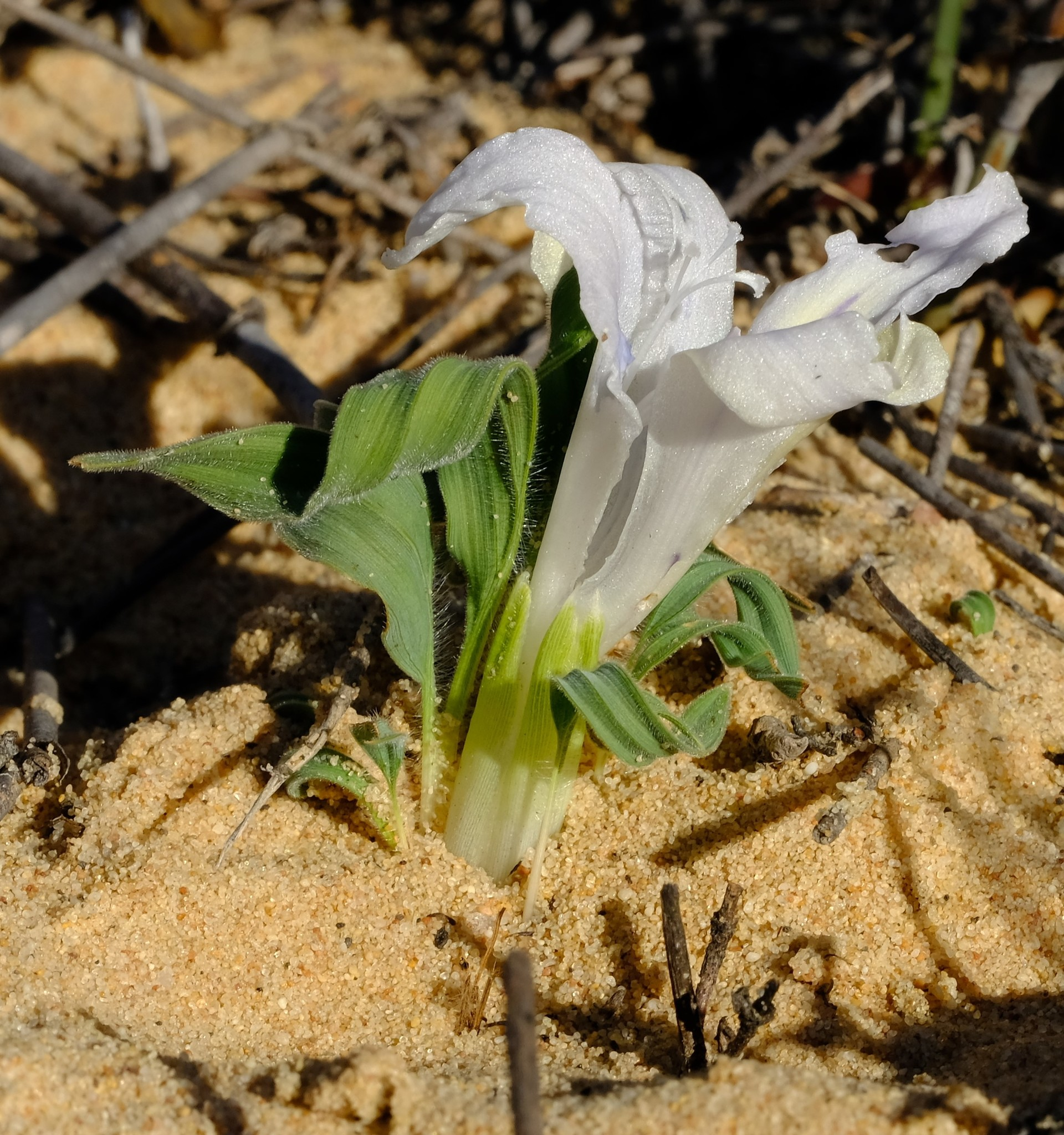
Babiana confusa

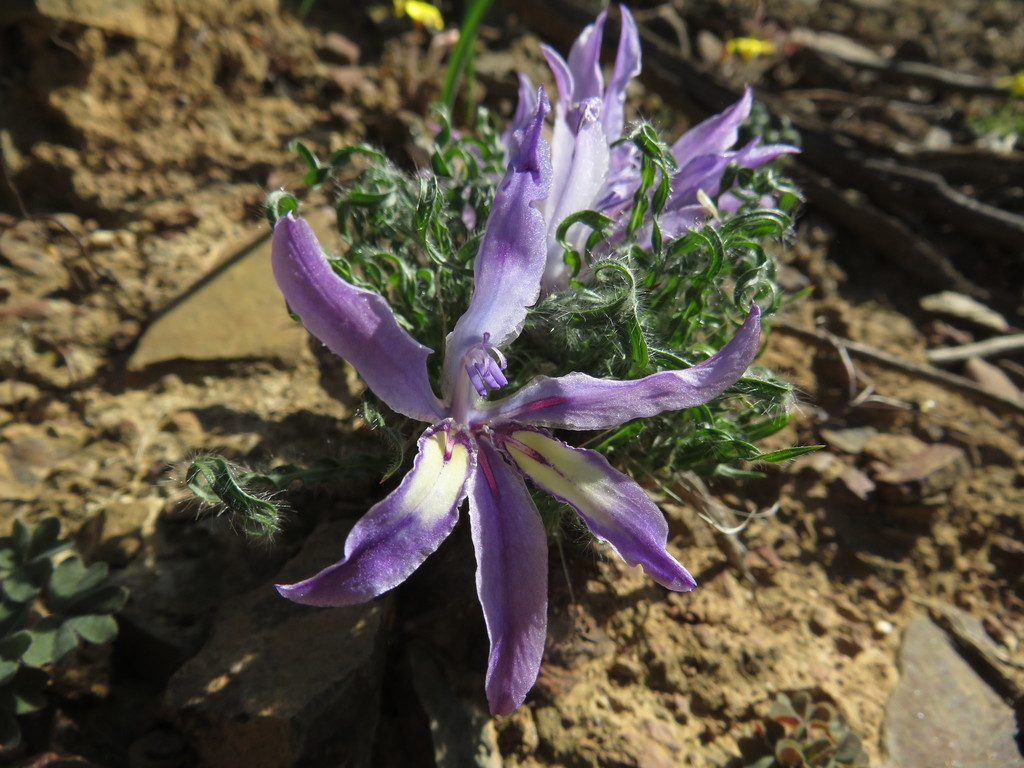
Babiana crispa

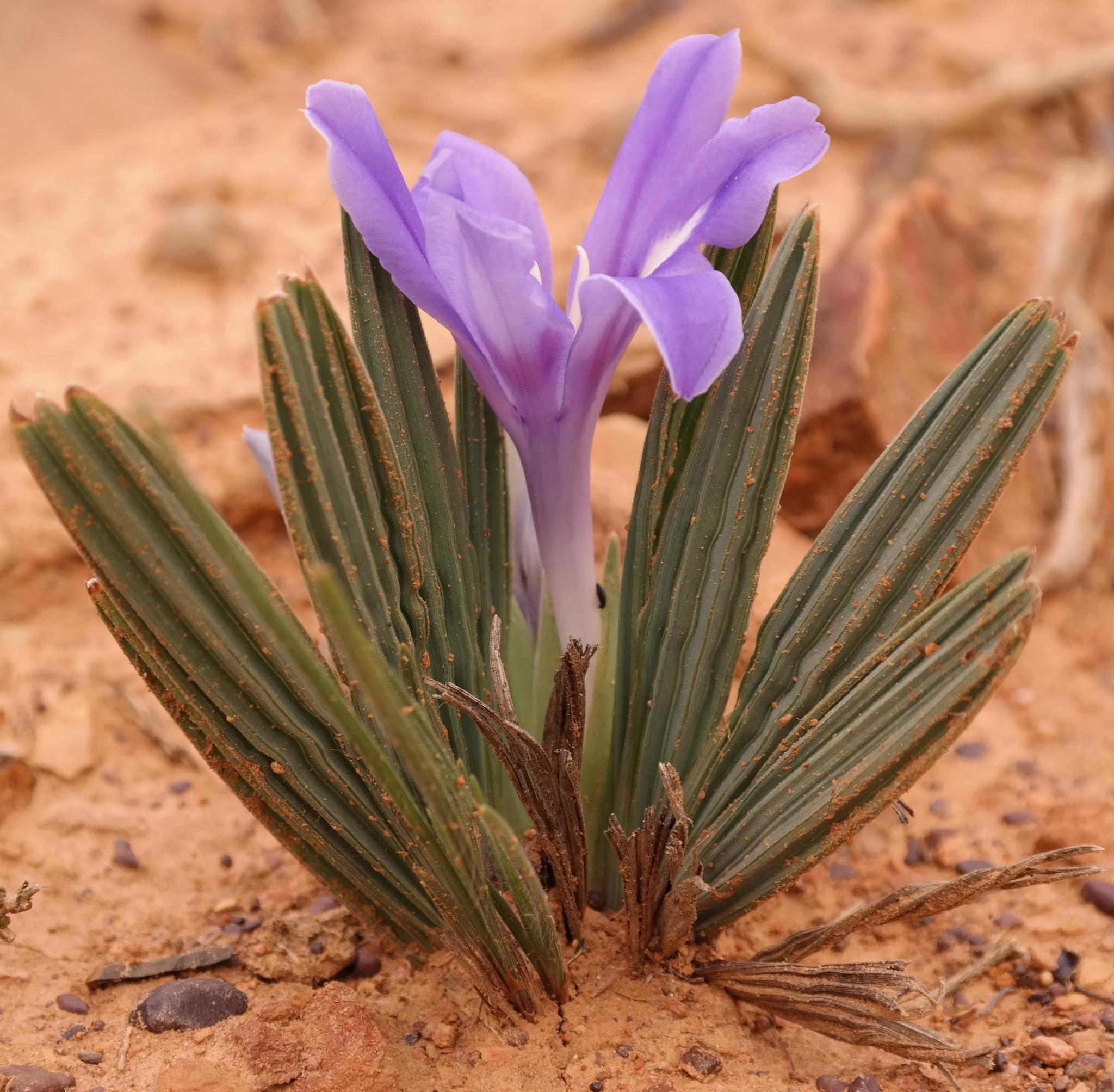
Babiana cuneata

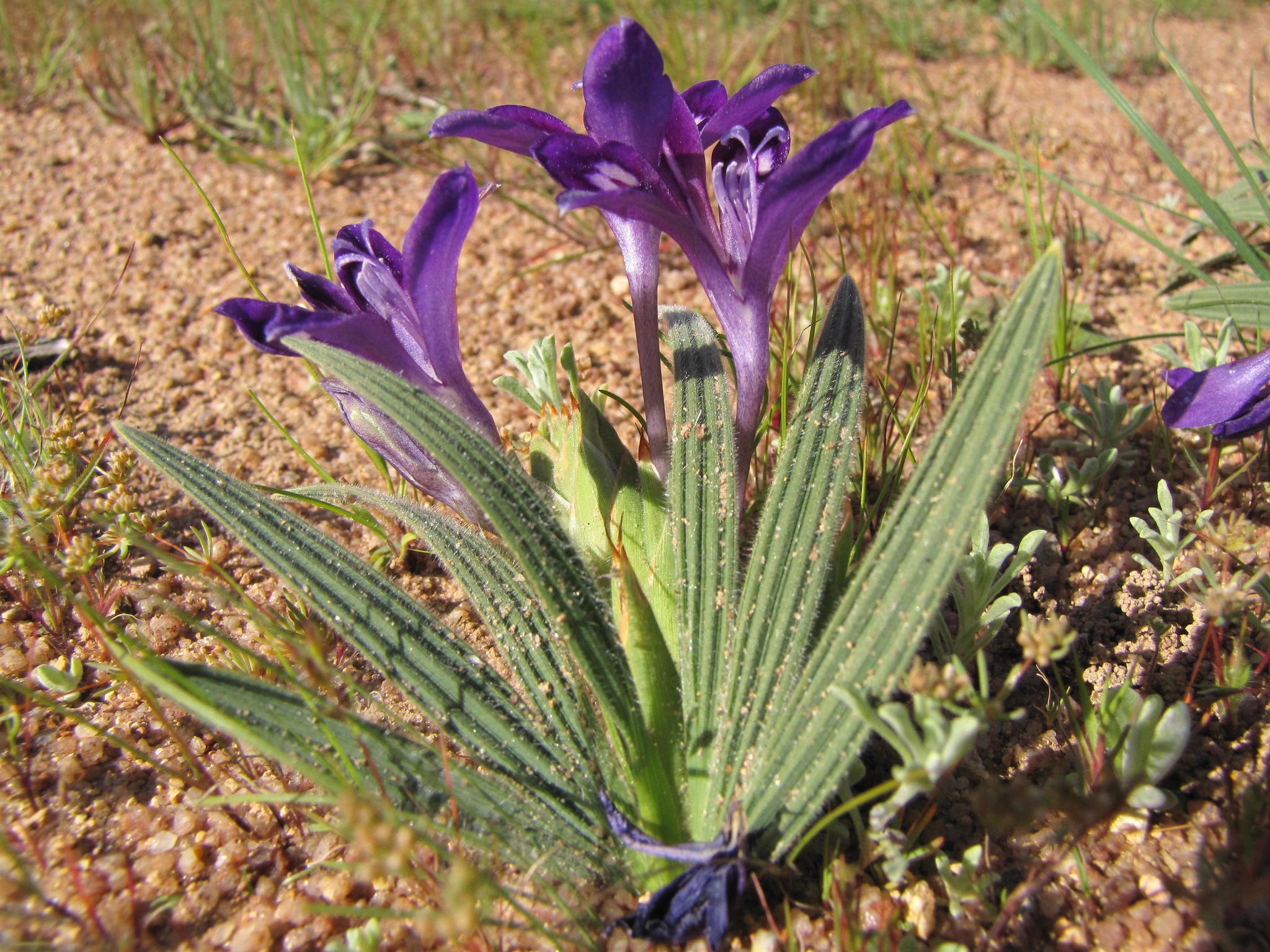
Babiana curviscapa

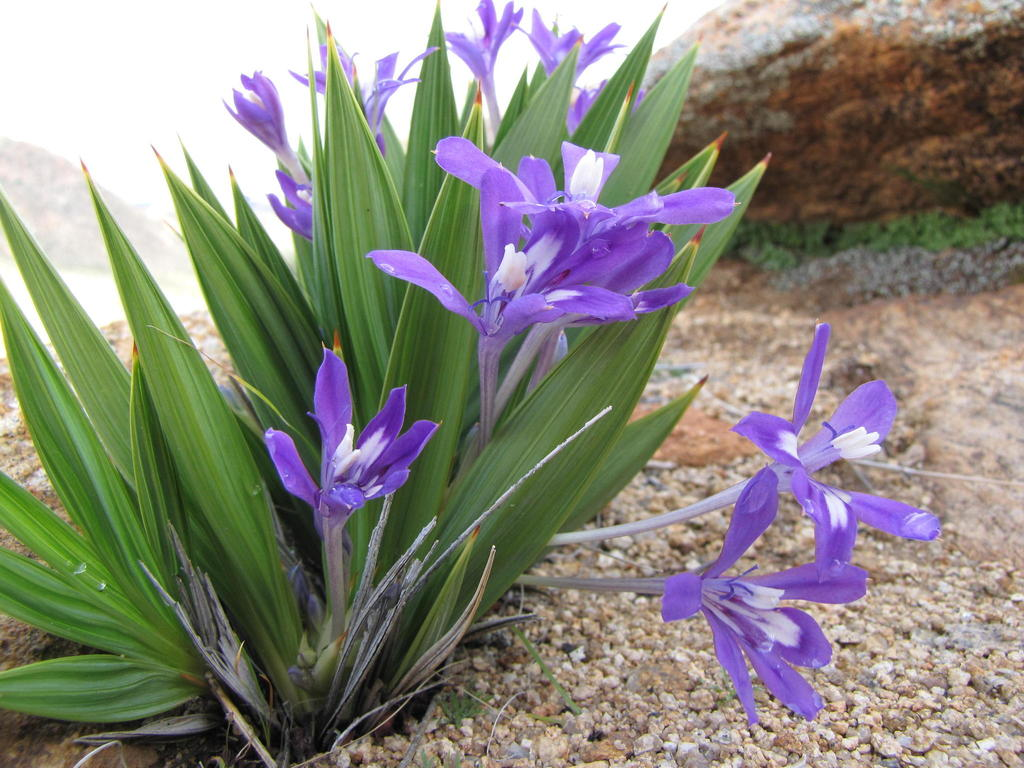
Babiana dregei

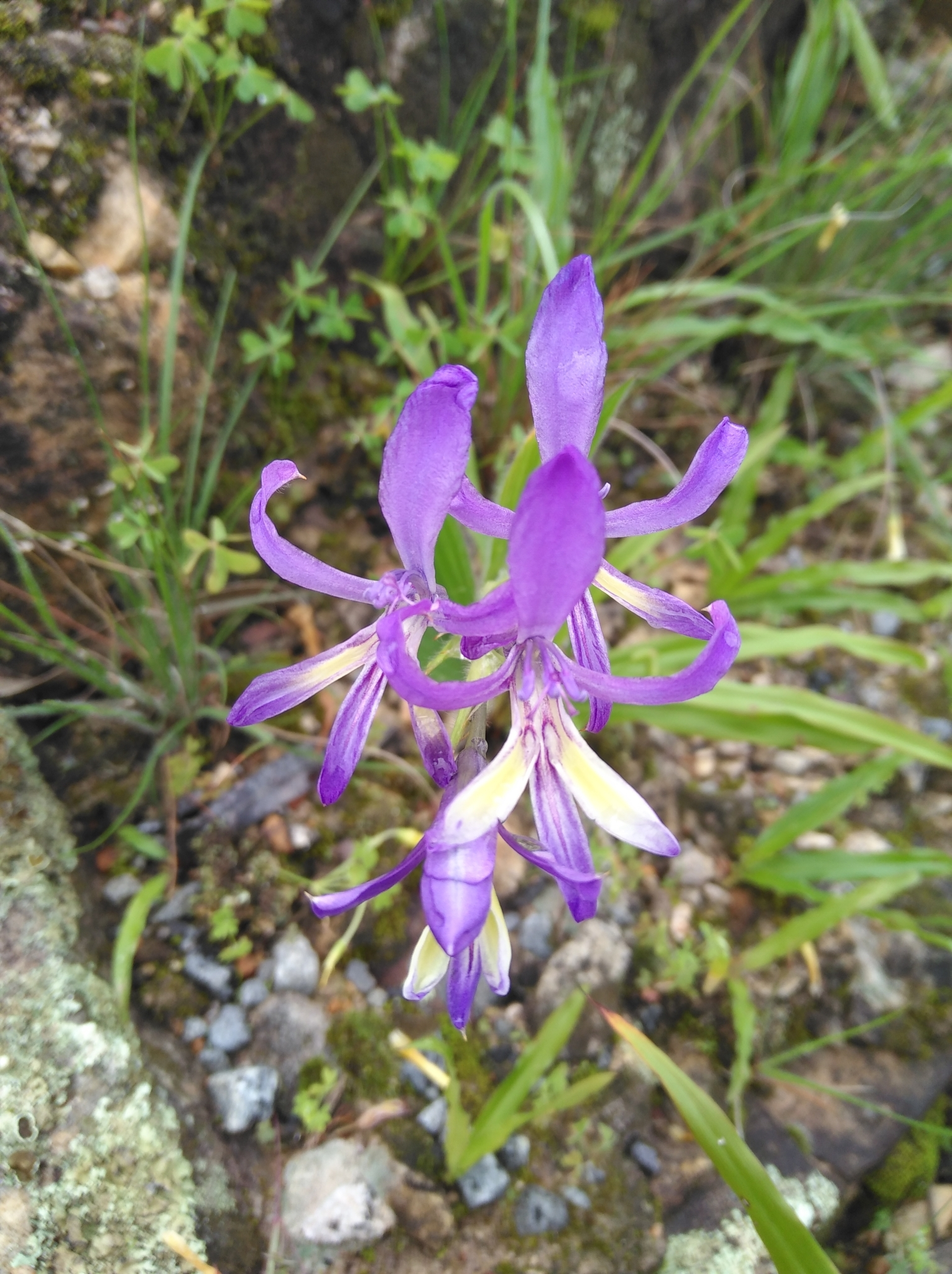
Babiana ecklonii

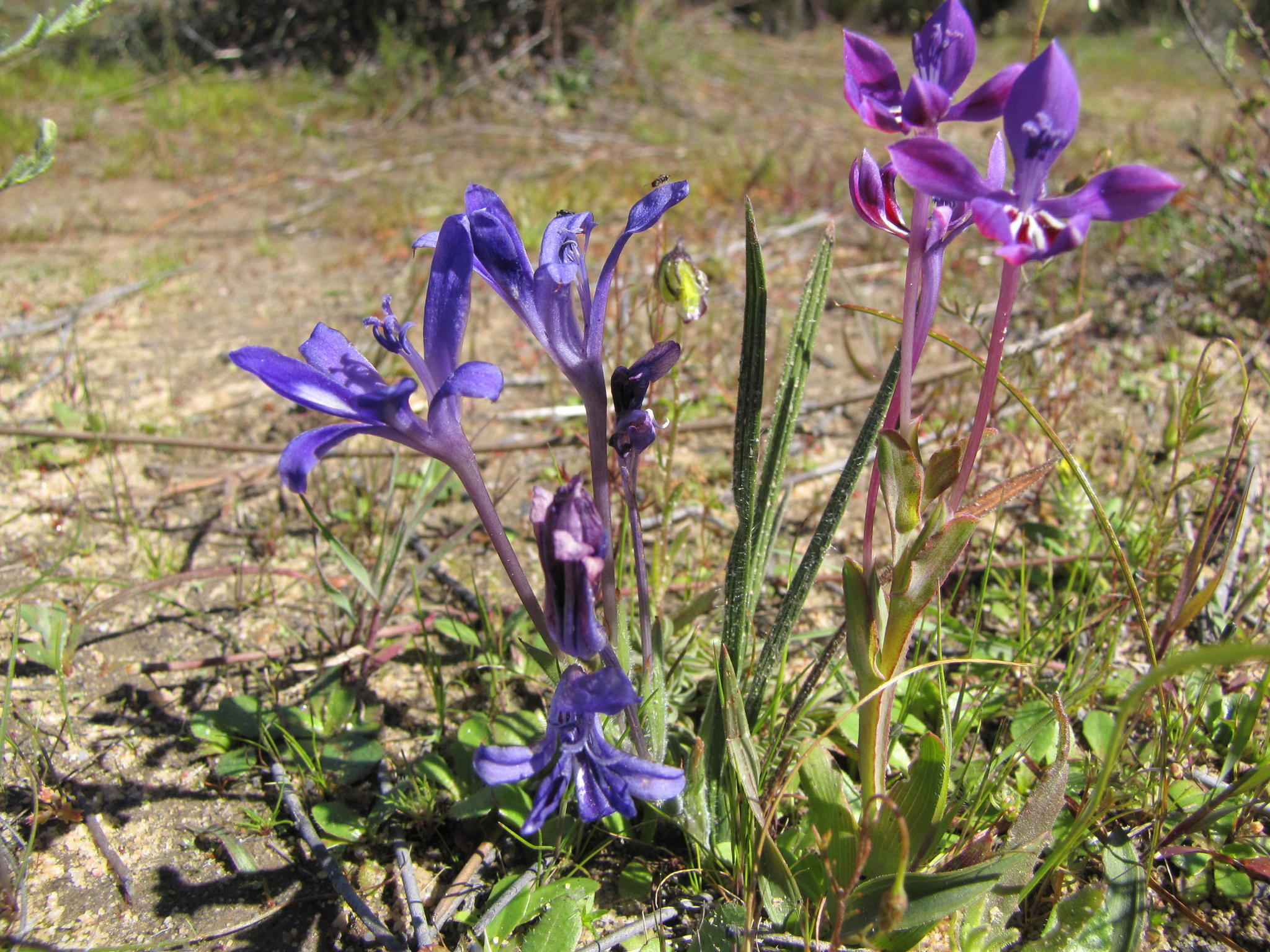
Babiana engysiphon

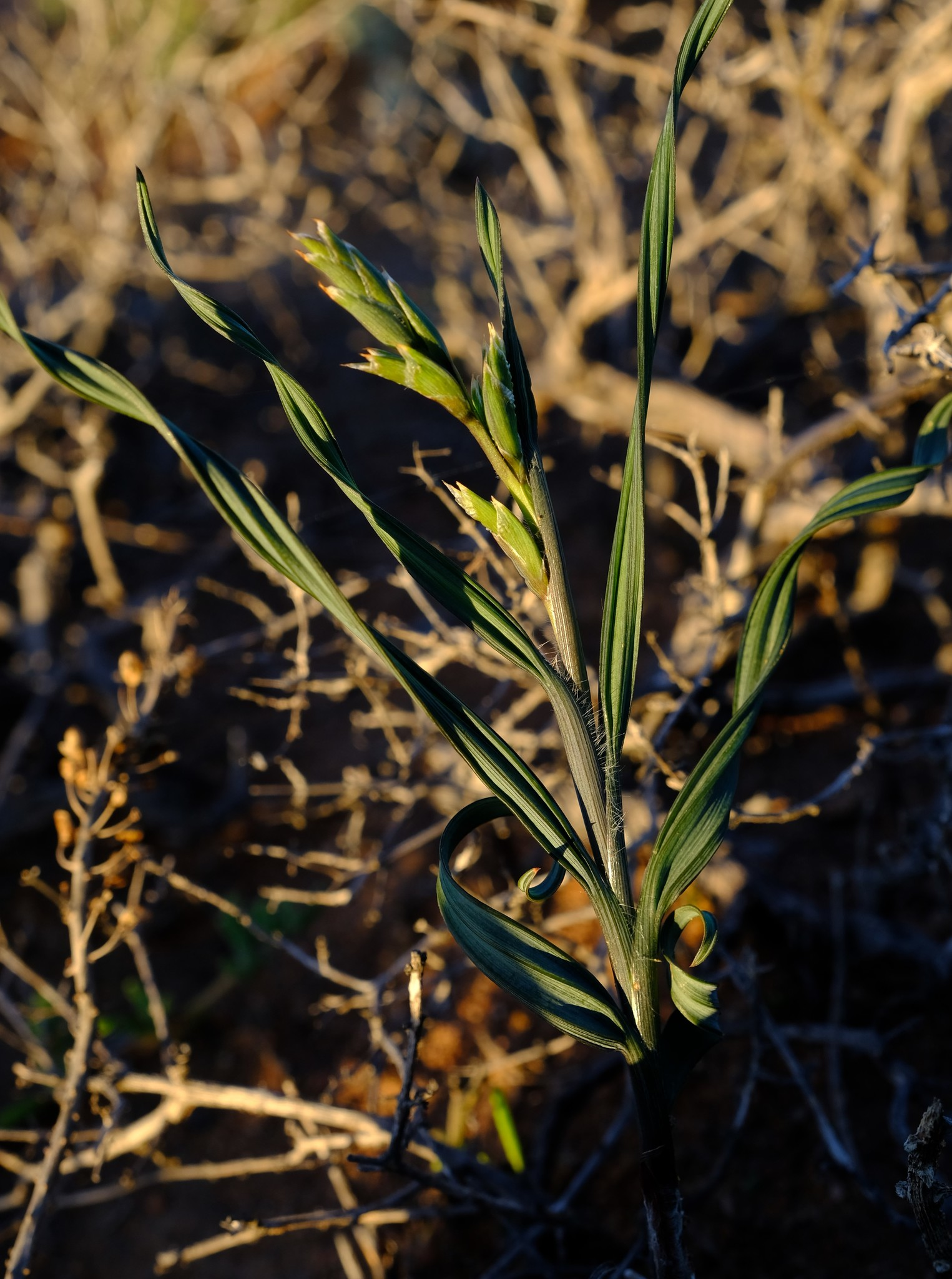
Babiana fimbriata

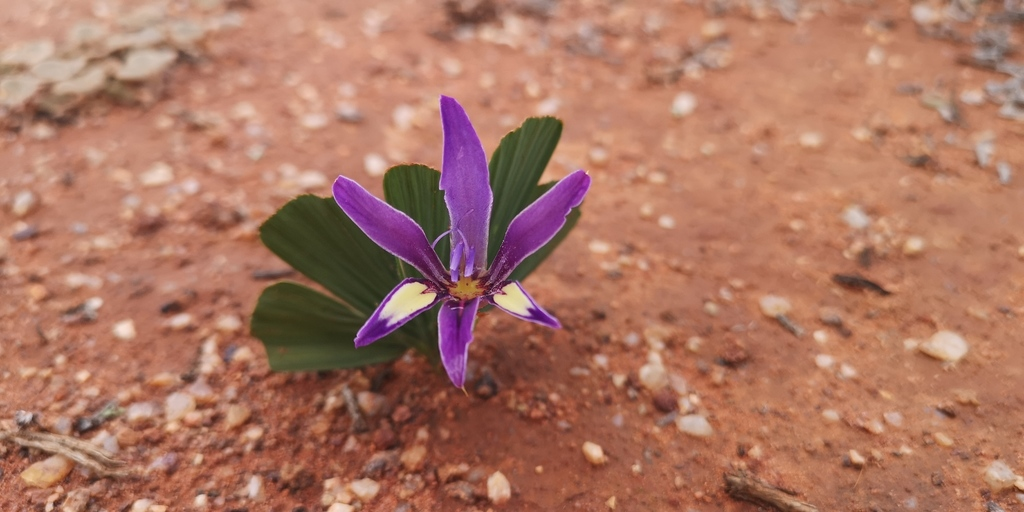
Babiana flabellifolia

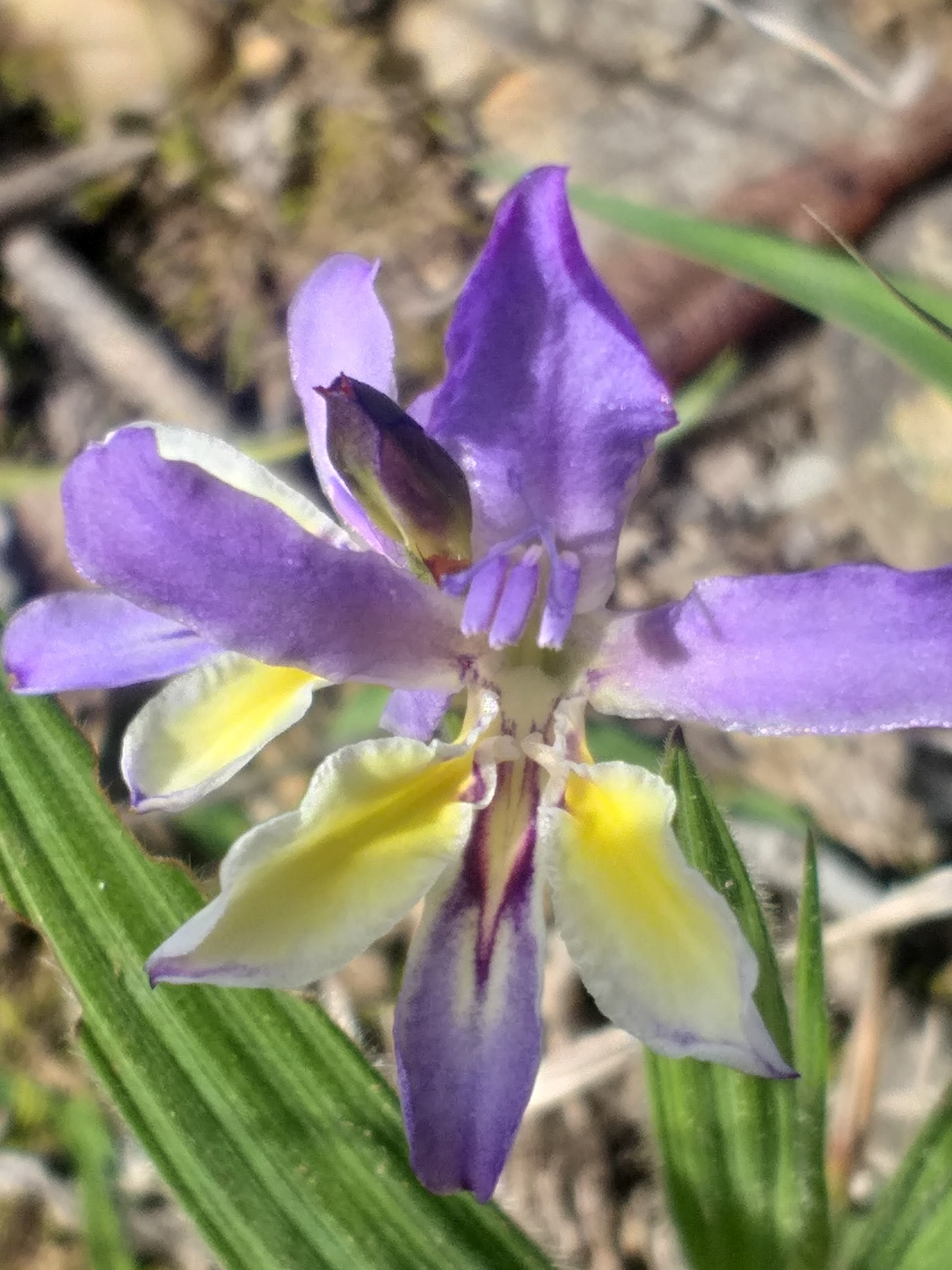
Babiana fourcadei

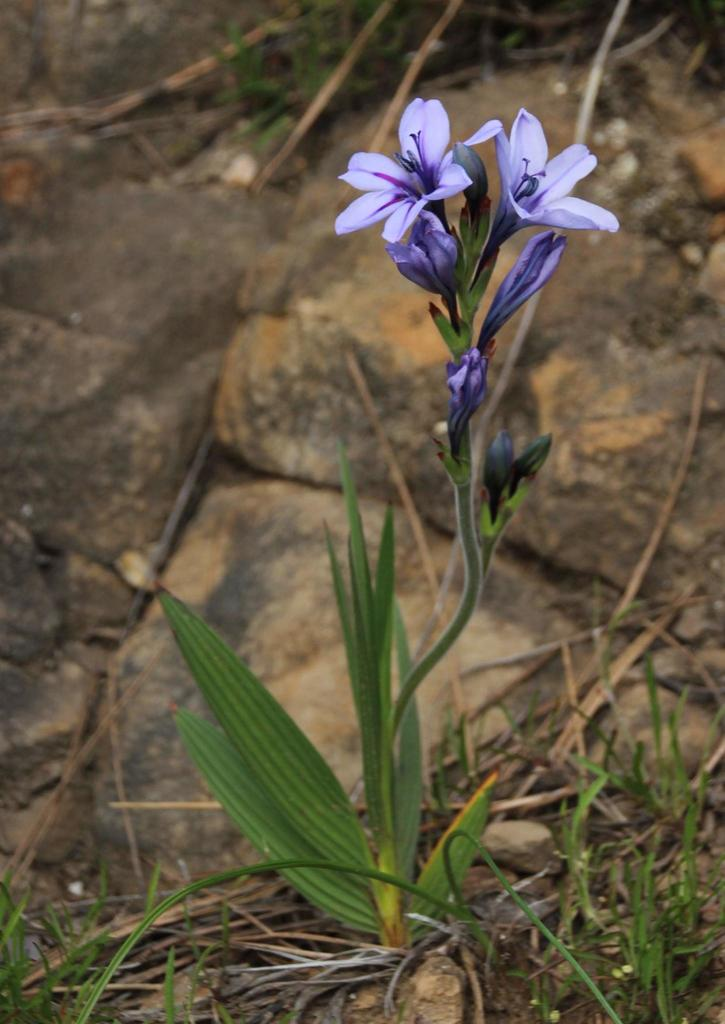
Babiana fragrans

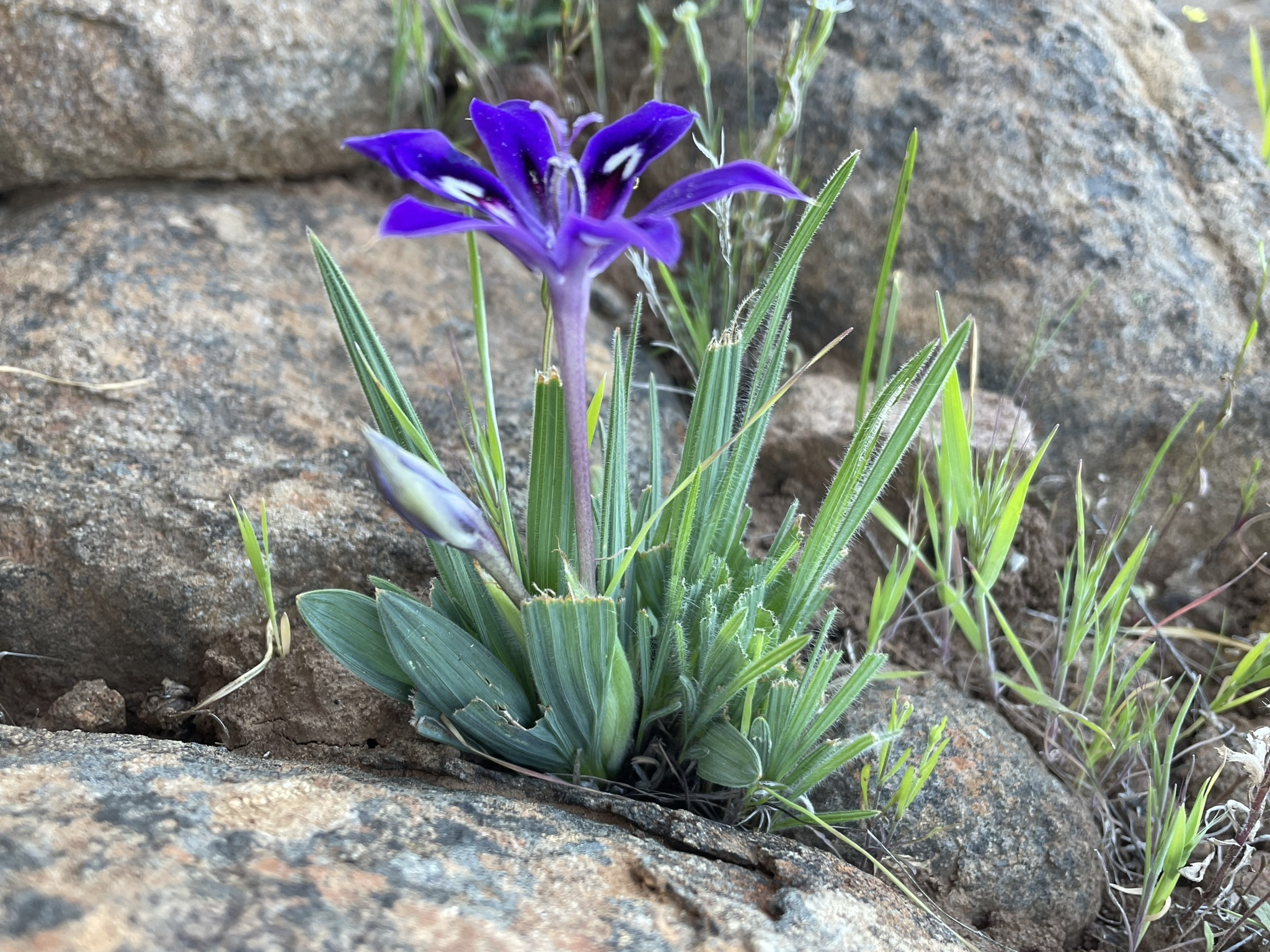
Babiana framesii

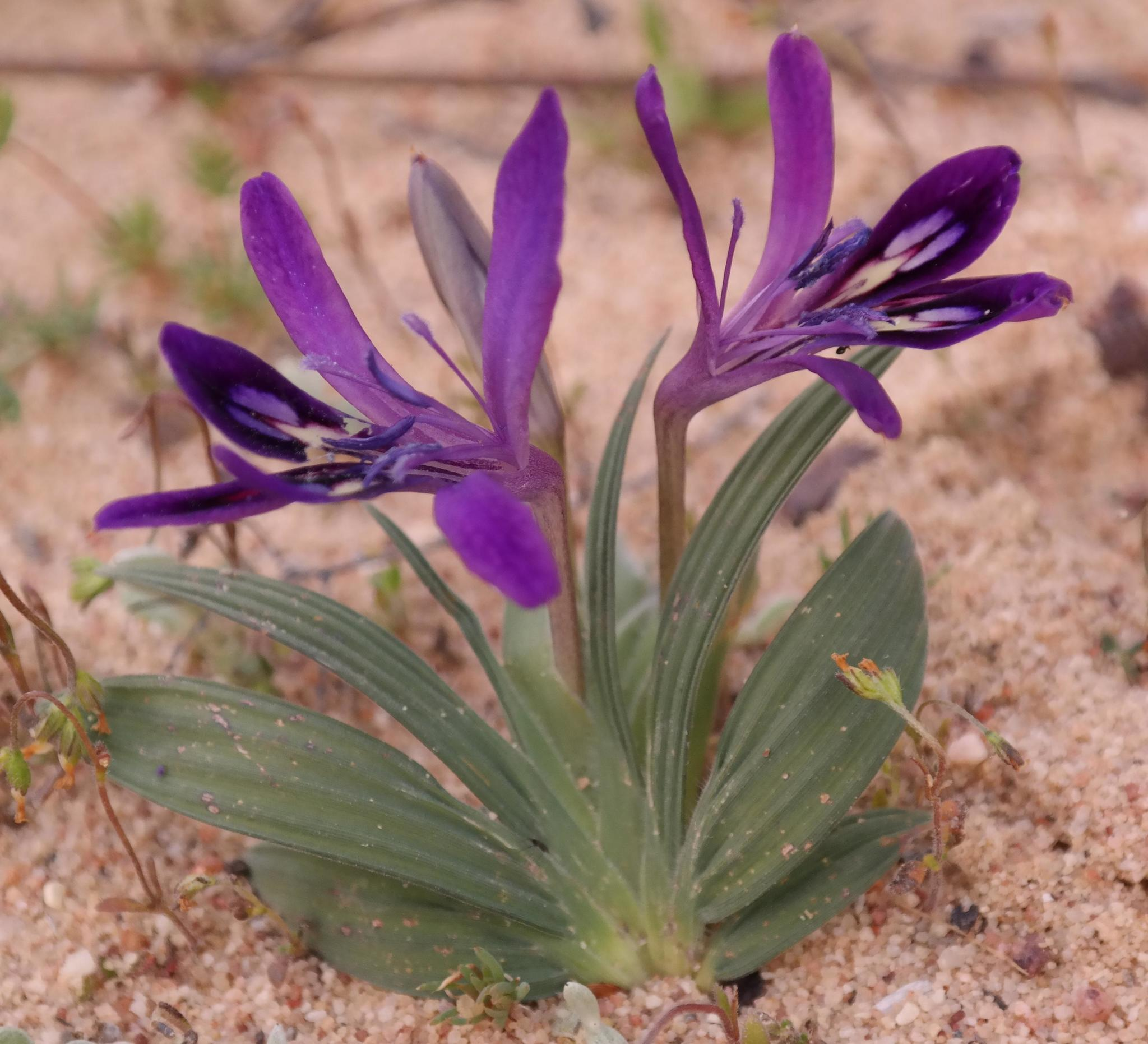
Babiana geniculata

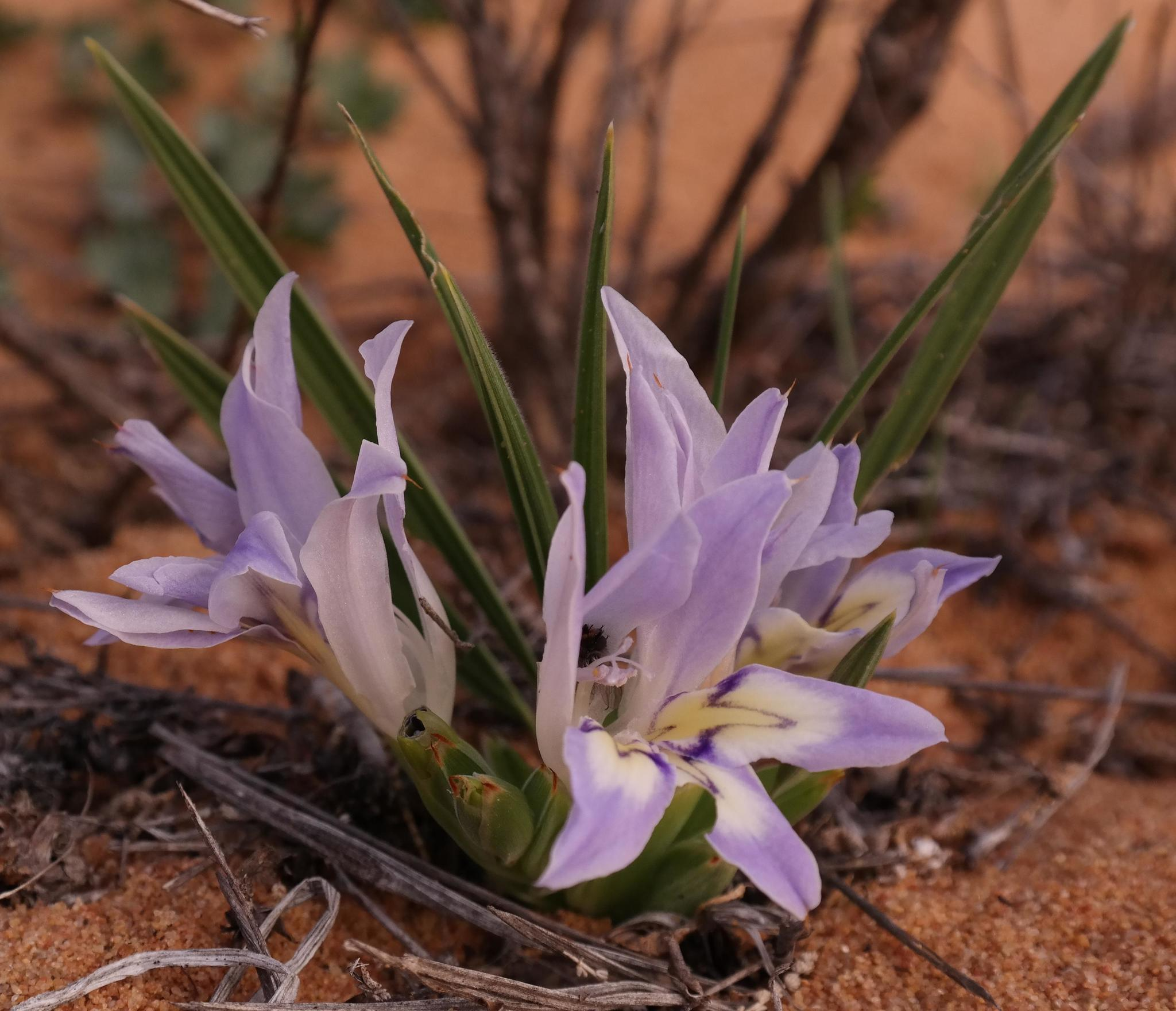
Babiana grandiflora

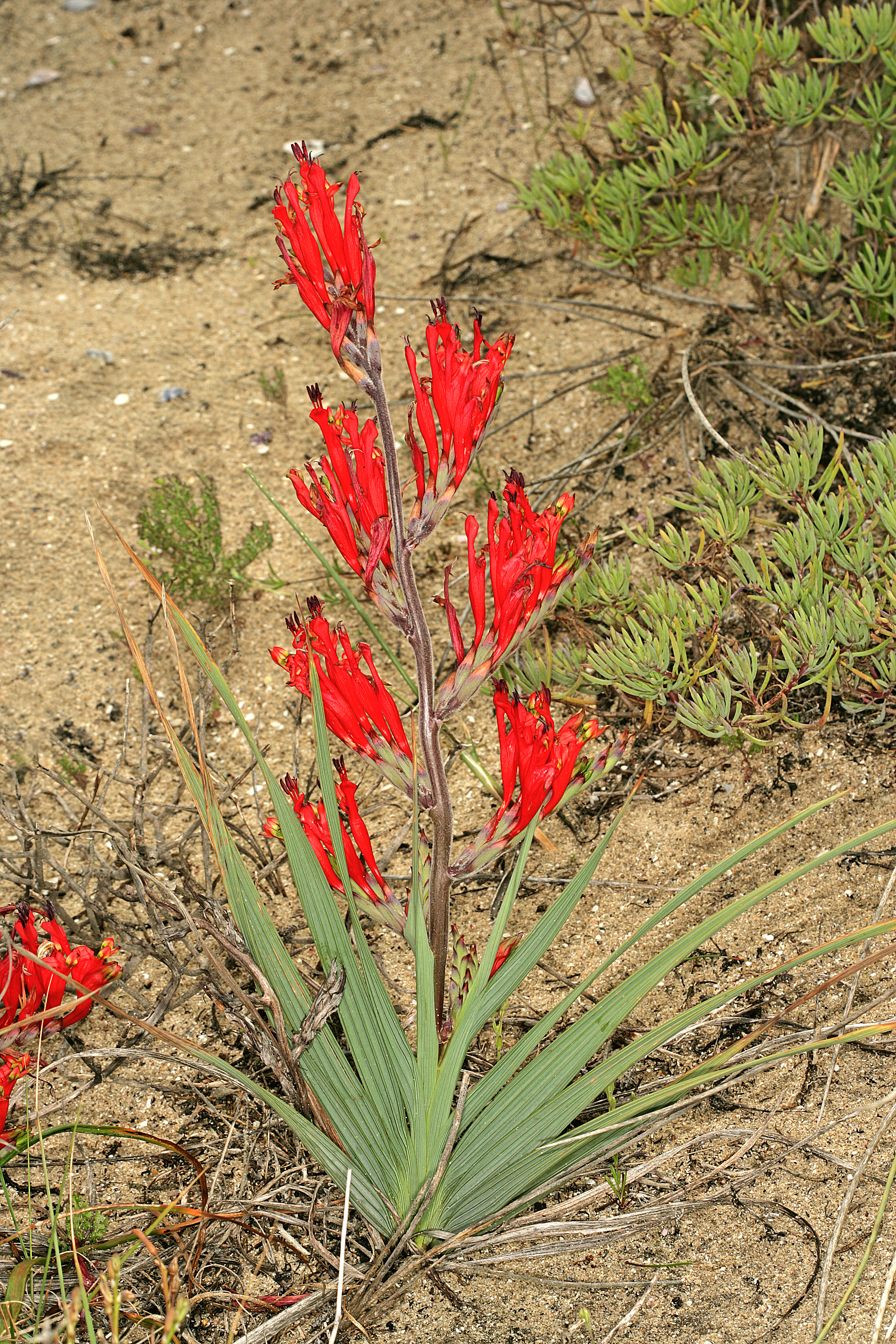
Babiana hirsuta

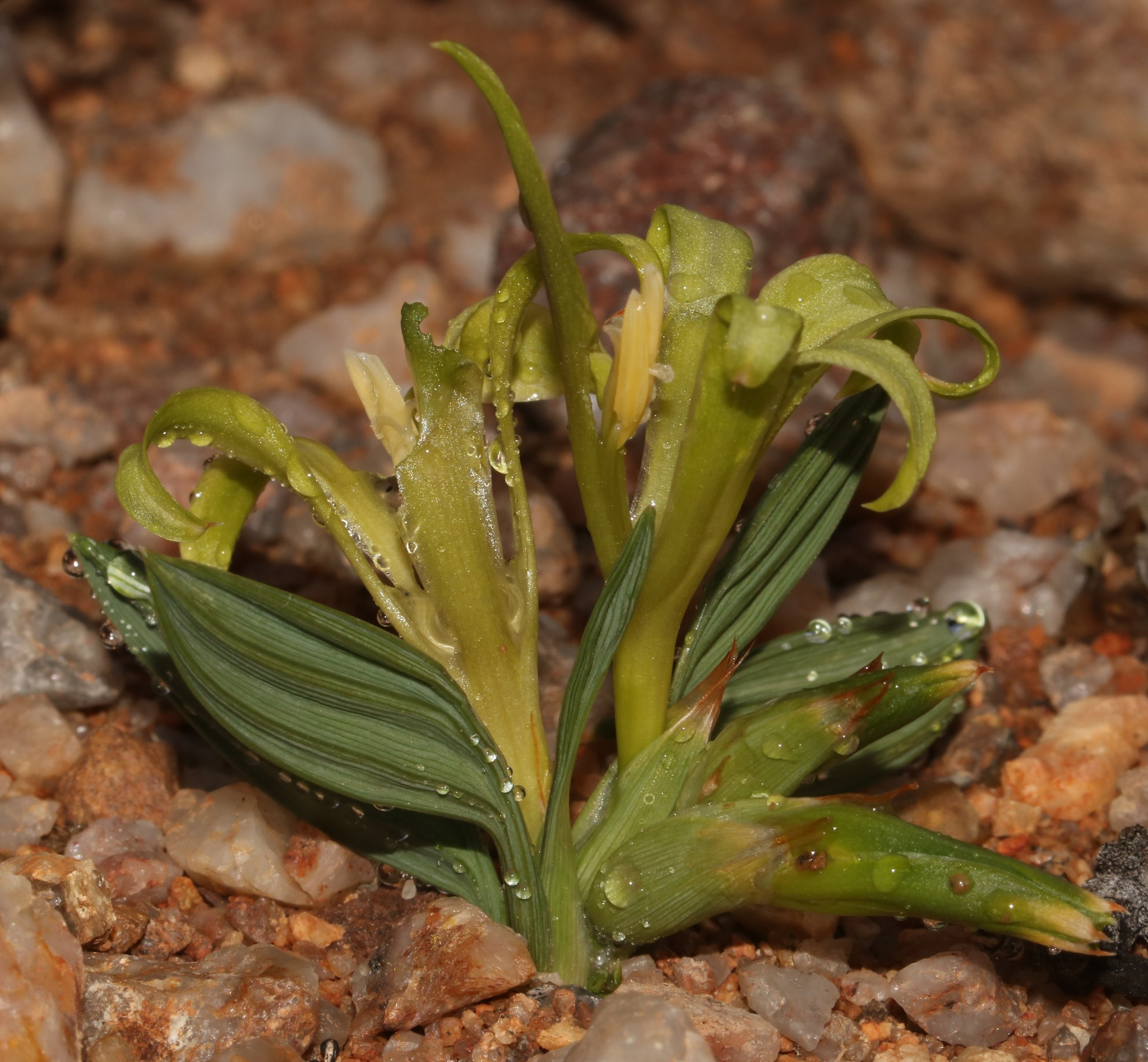
Babiana horizontalis

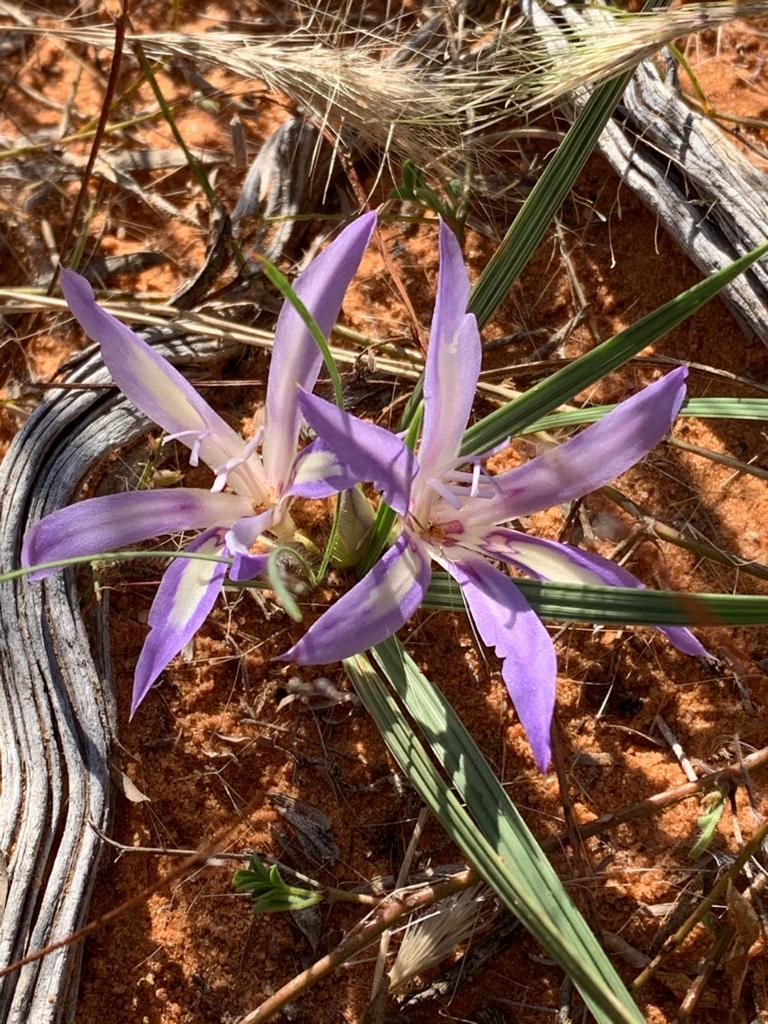
Babiana hypogaea

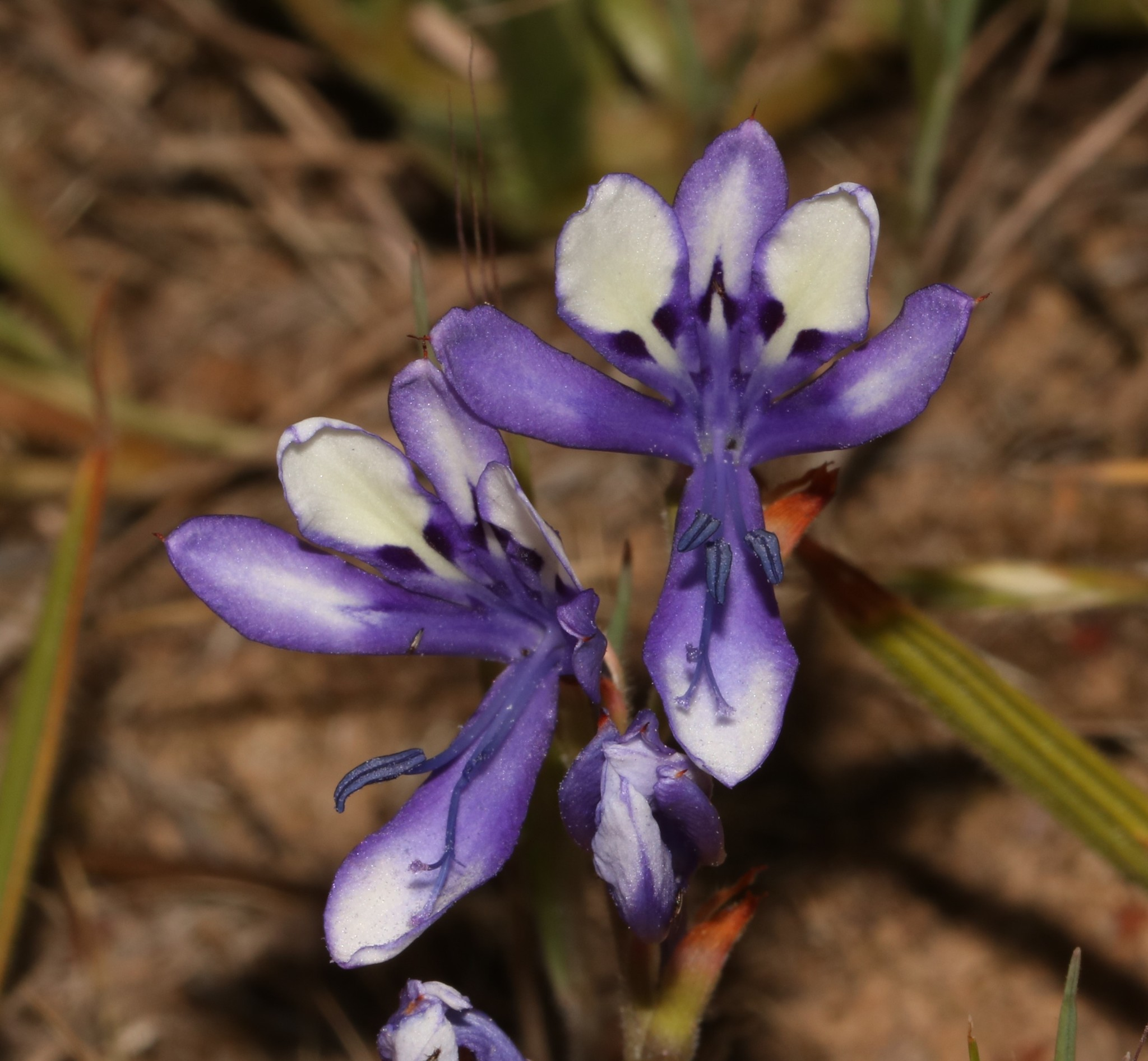
Babiana inclinata

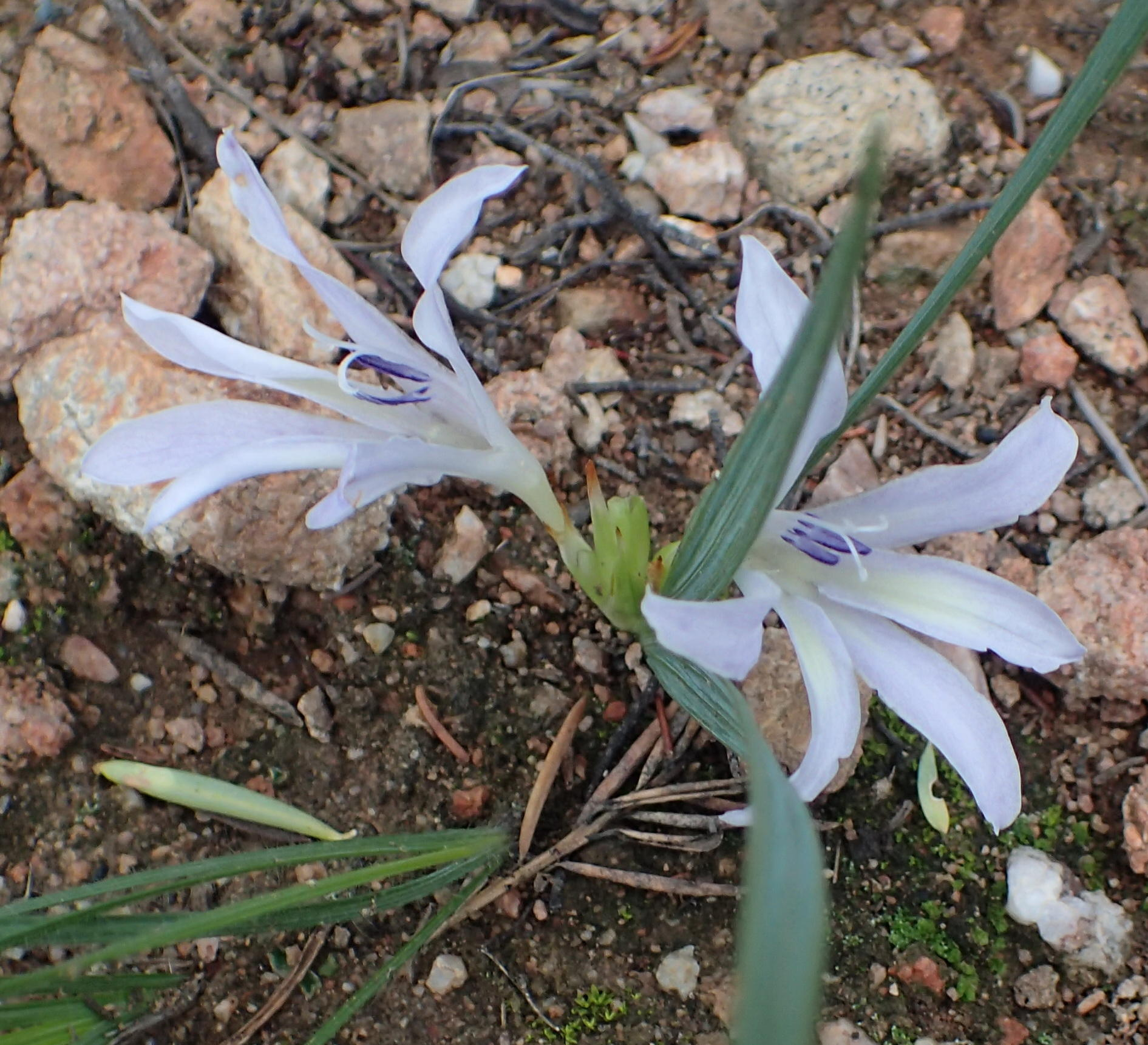
Babiana karooica

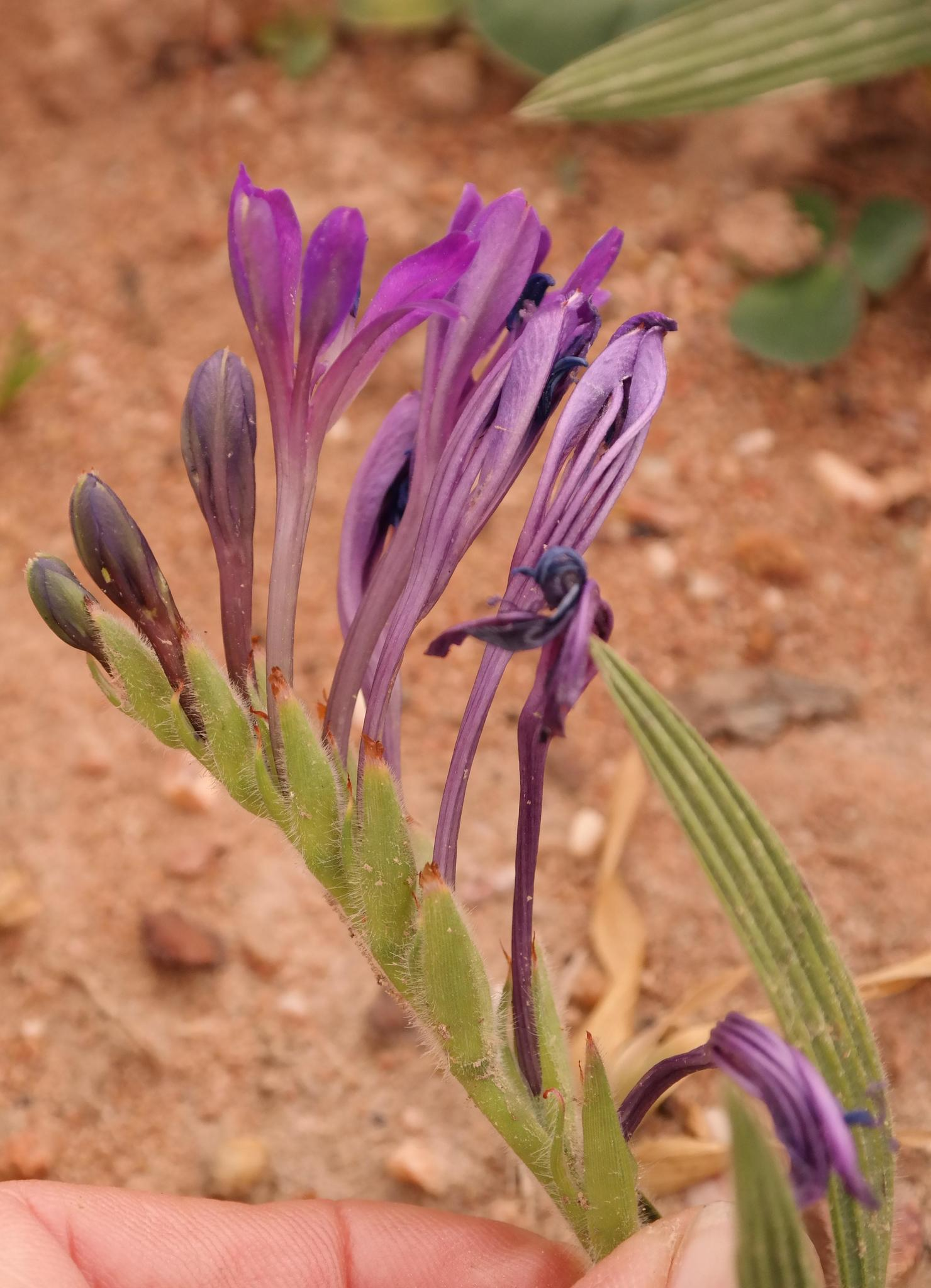
Babiana latifolia

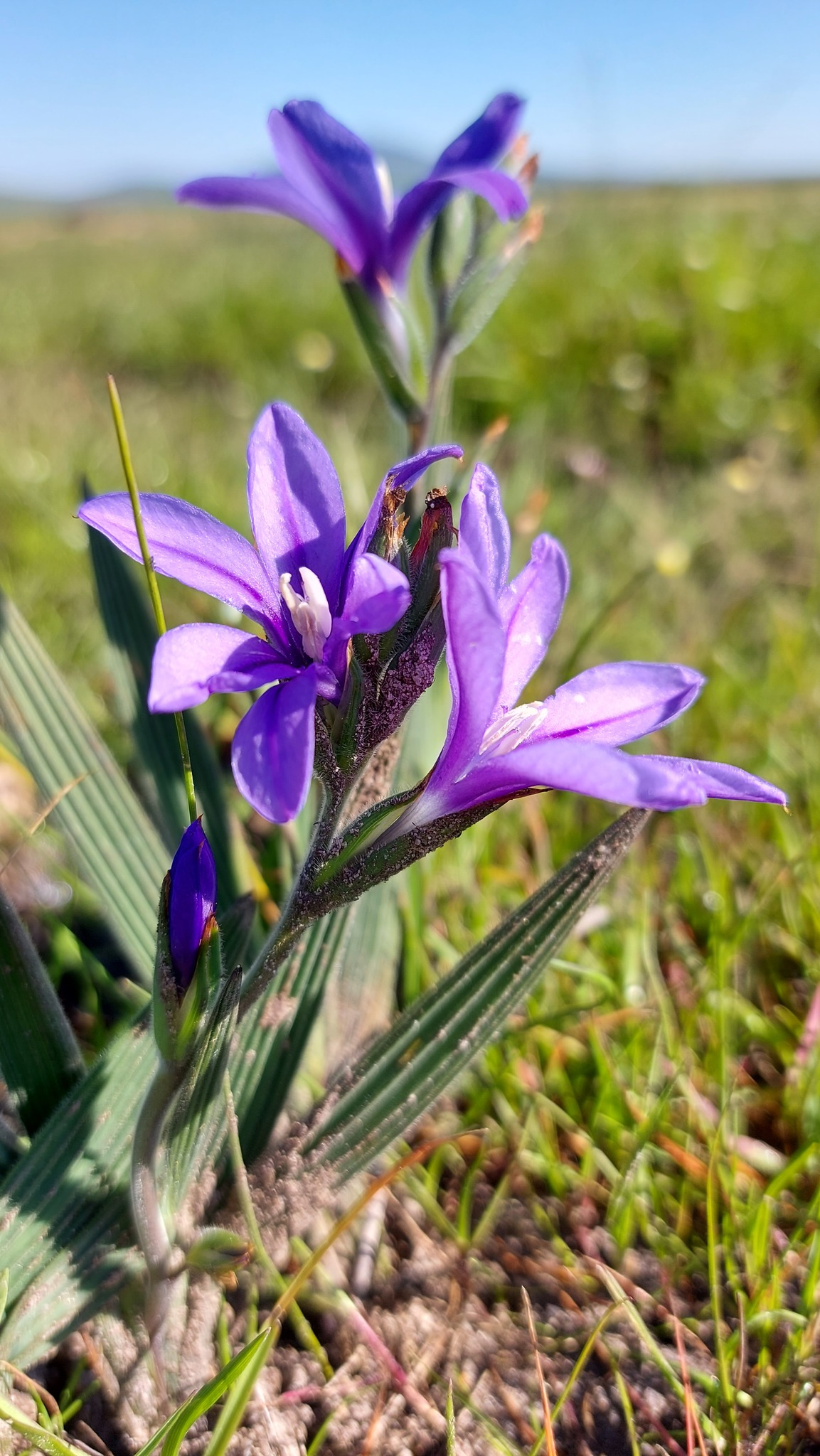
Babiana leipoldtii

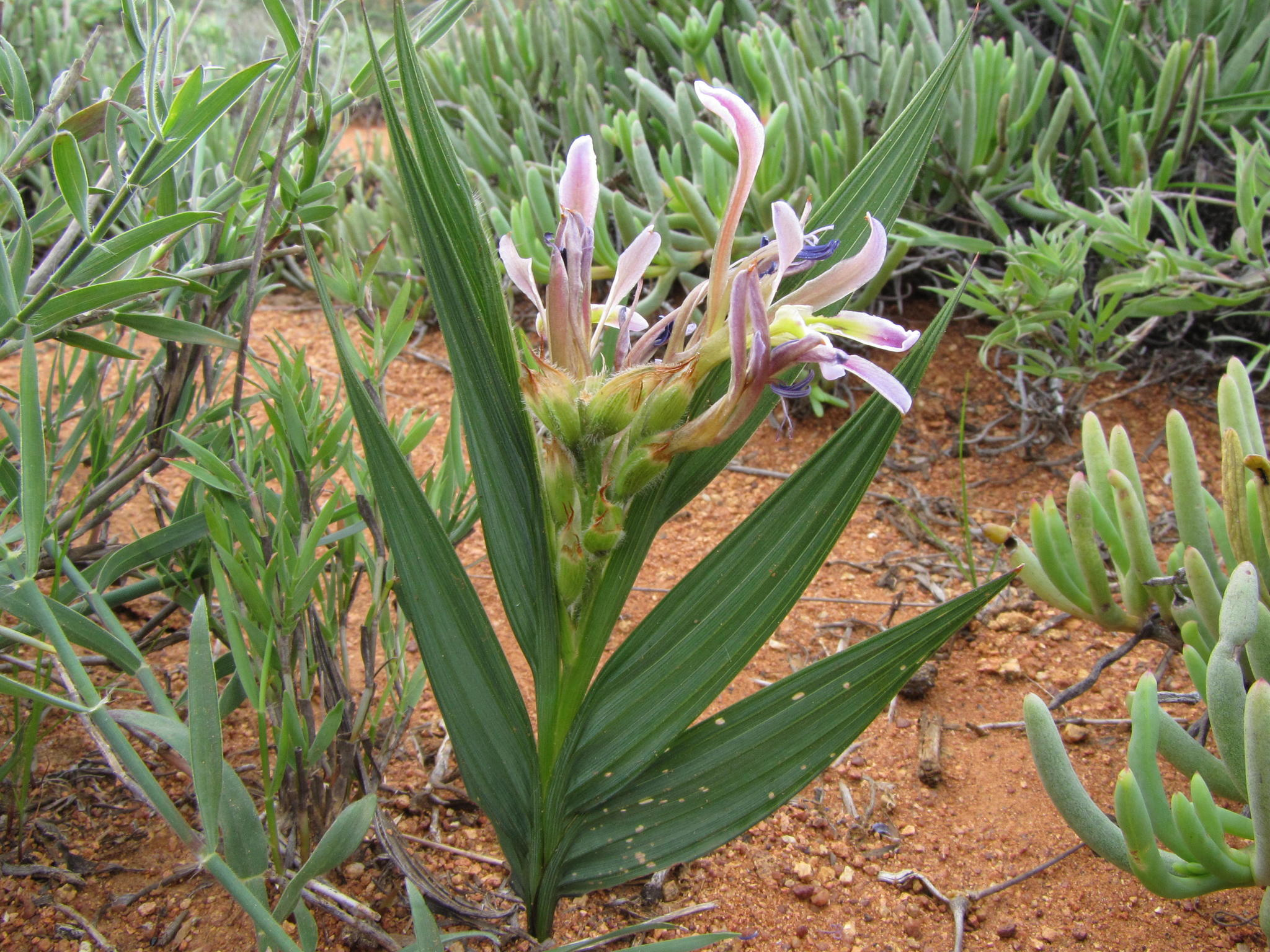
Babiana lewisiana

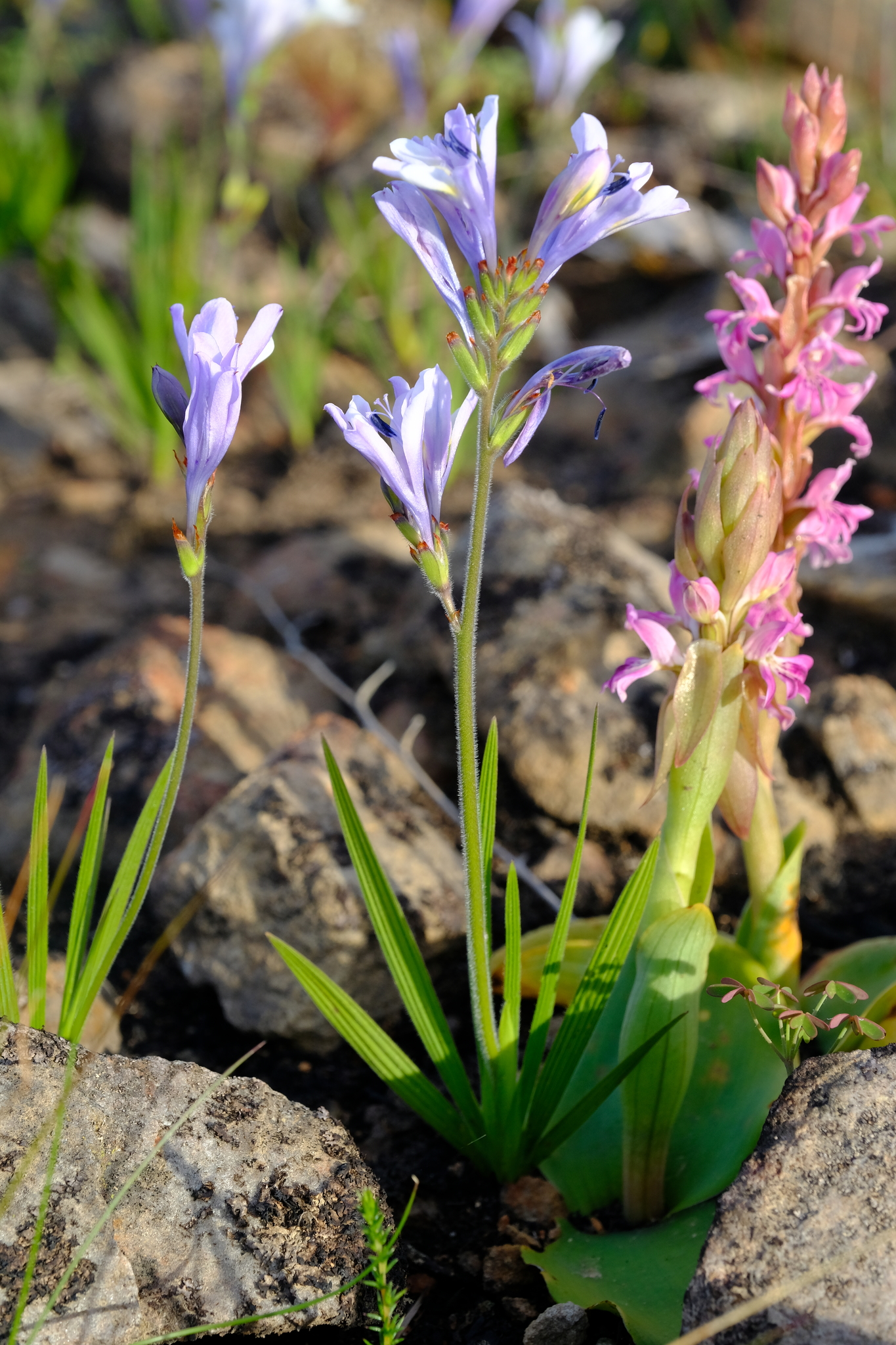
Babiana lineolata

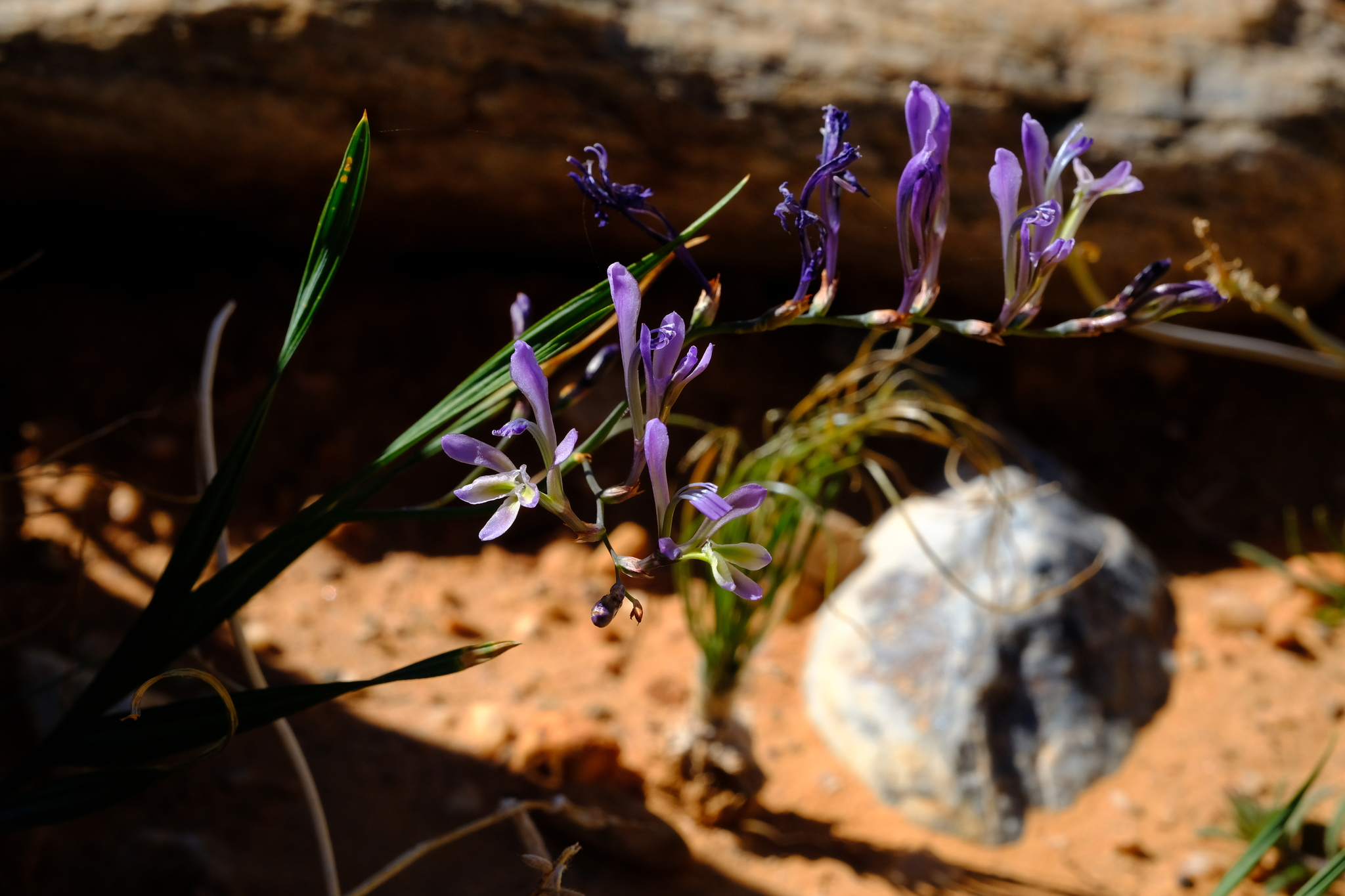
Babiana lobata

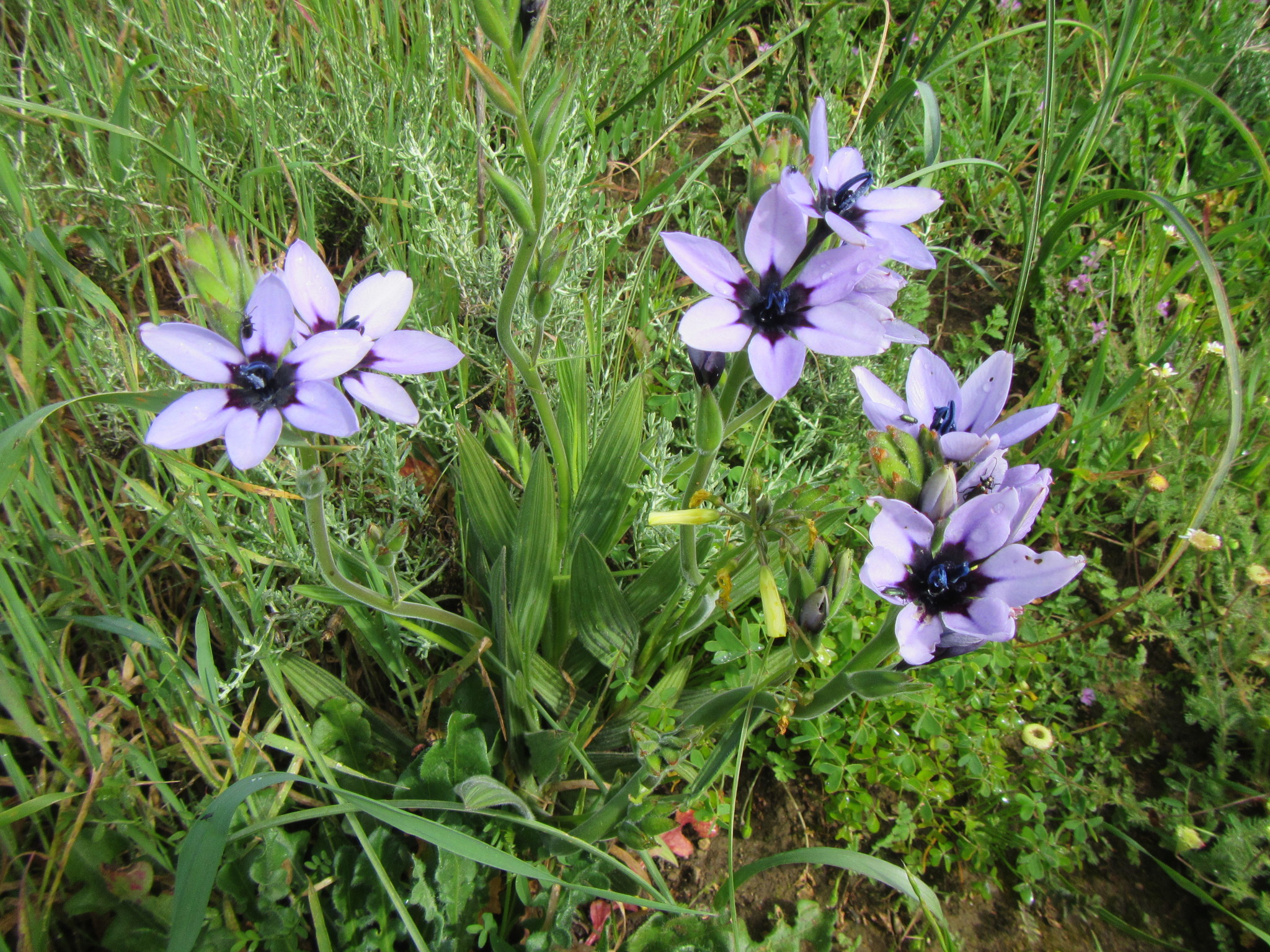
Babiana melanops

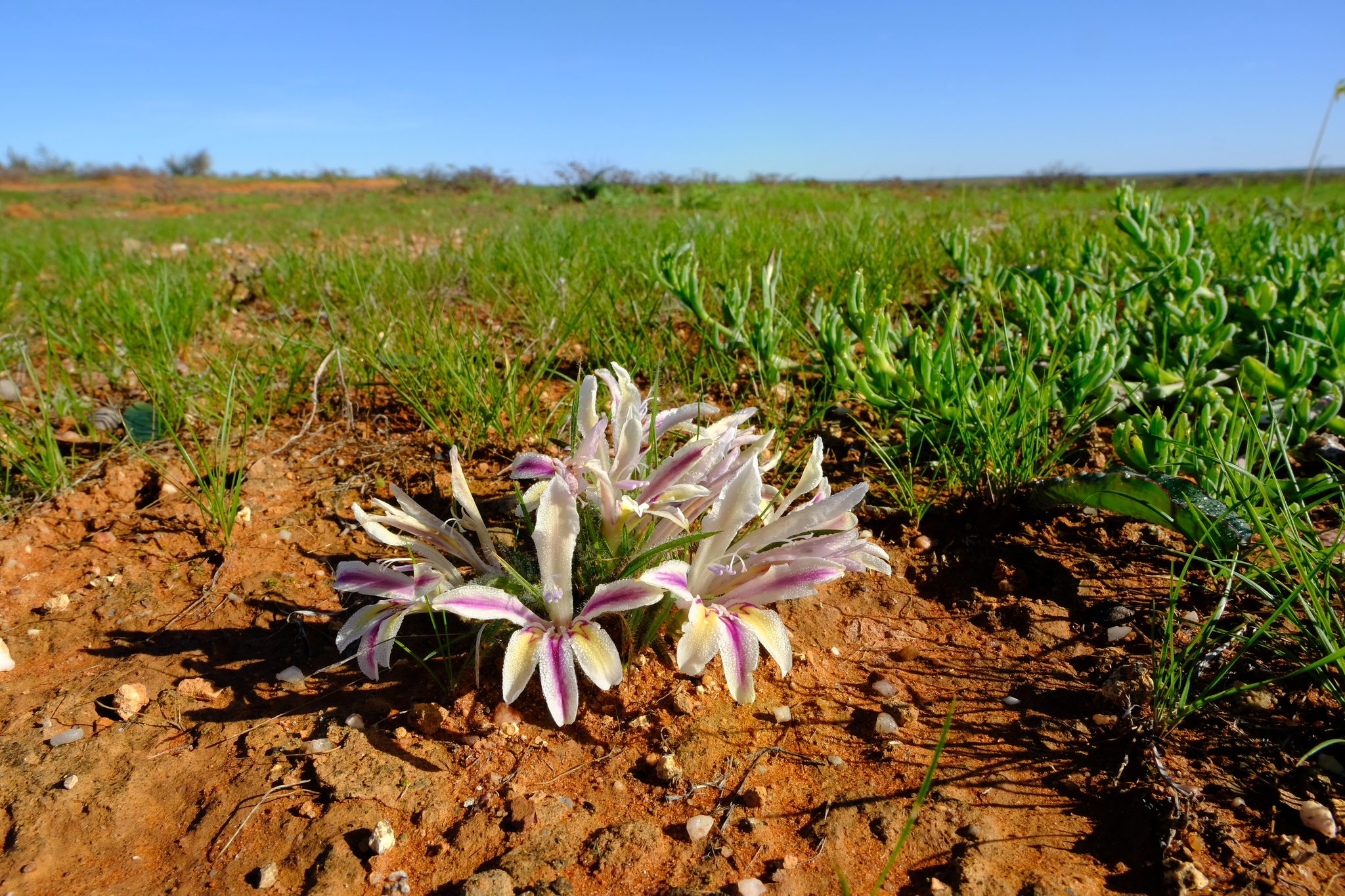
Babiana minuta

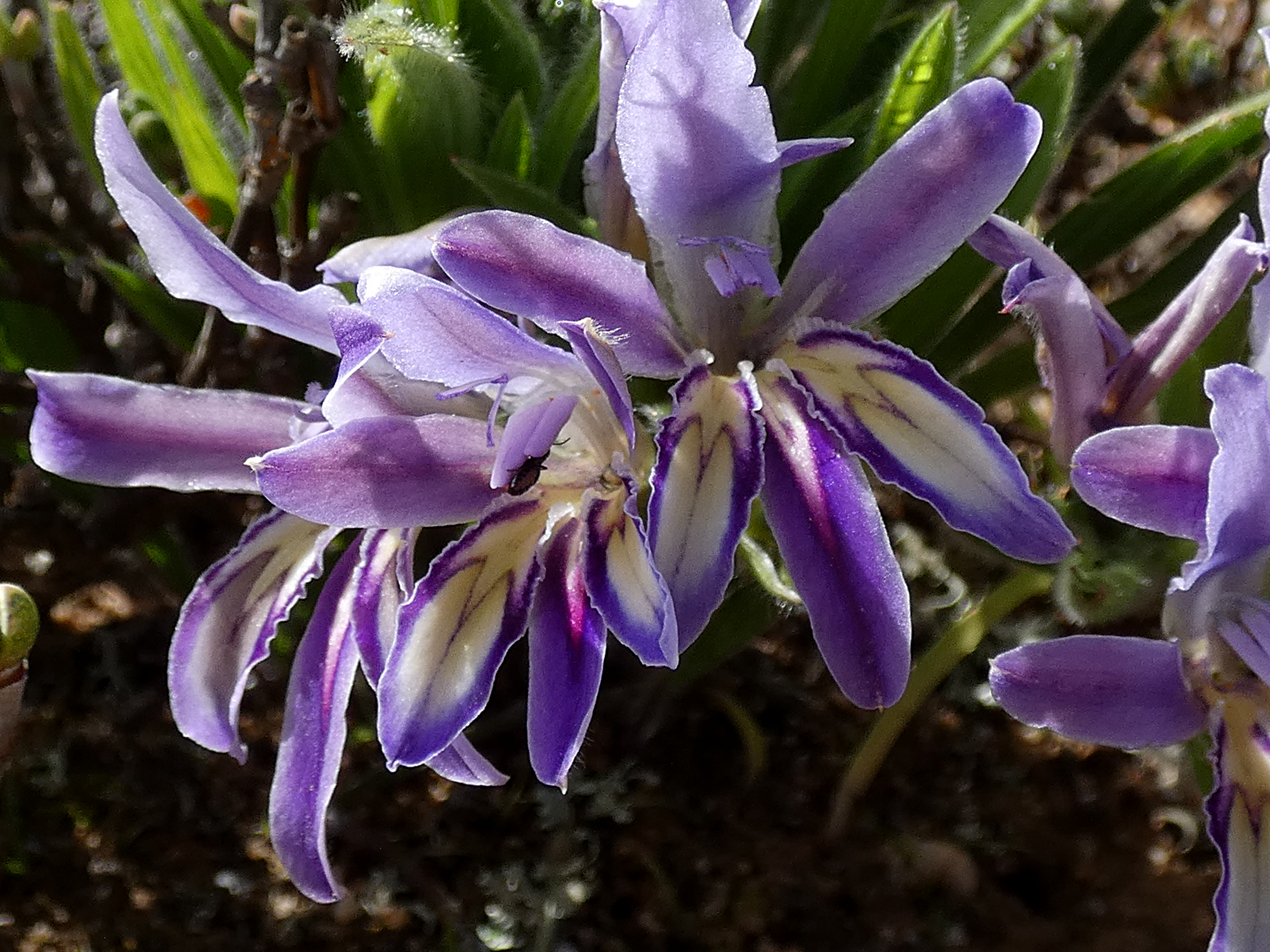
Babiana mucronata ssp. mucronata

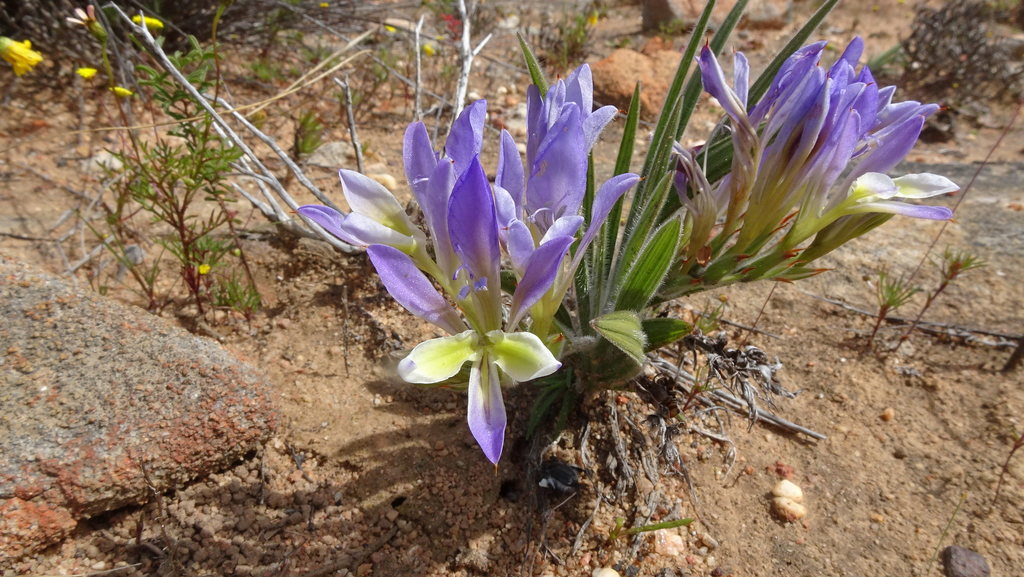
Babiana mucronata ssp. minor

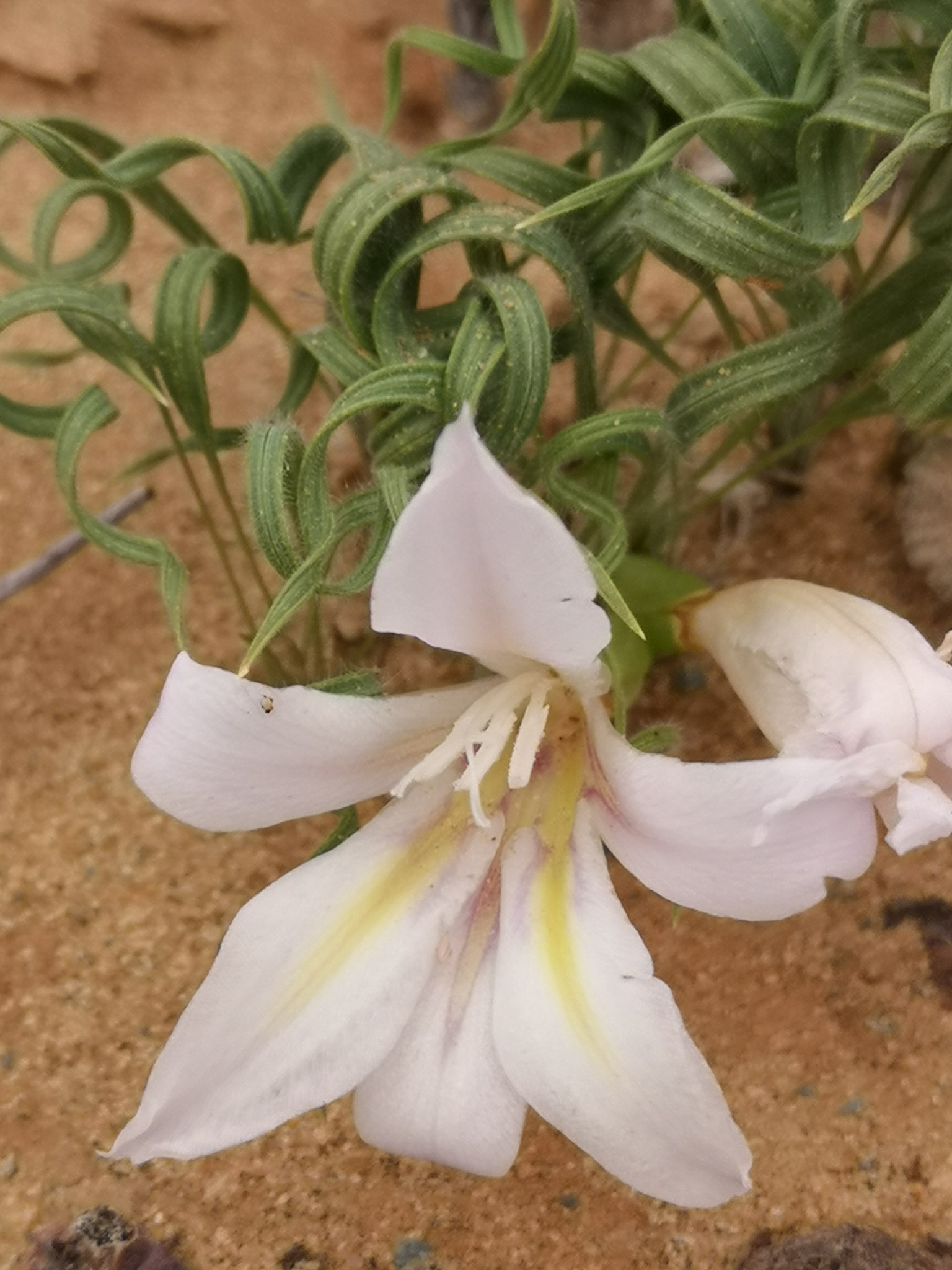
Babiana namaquensis

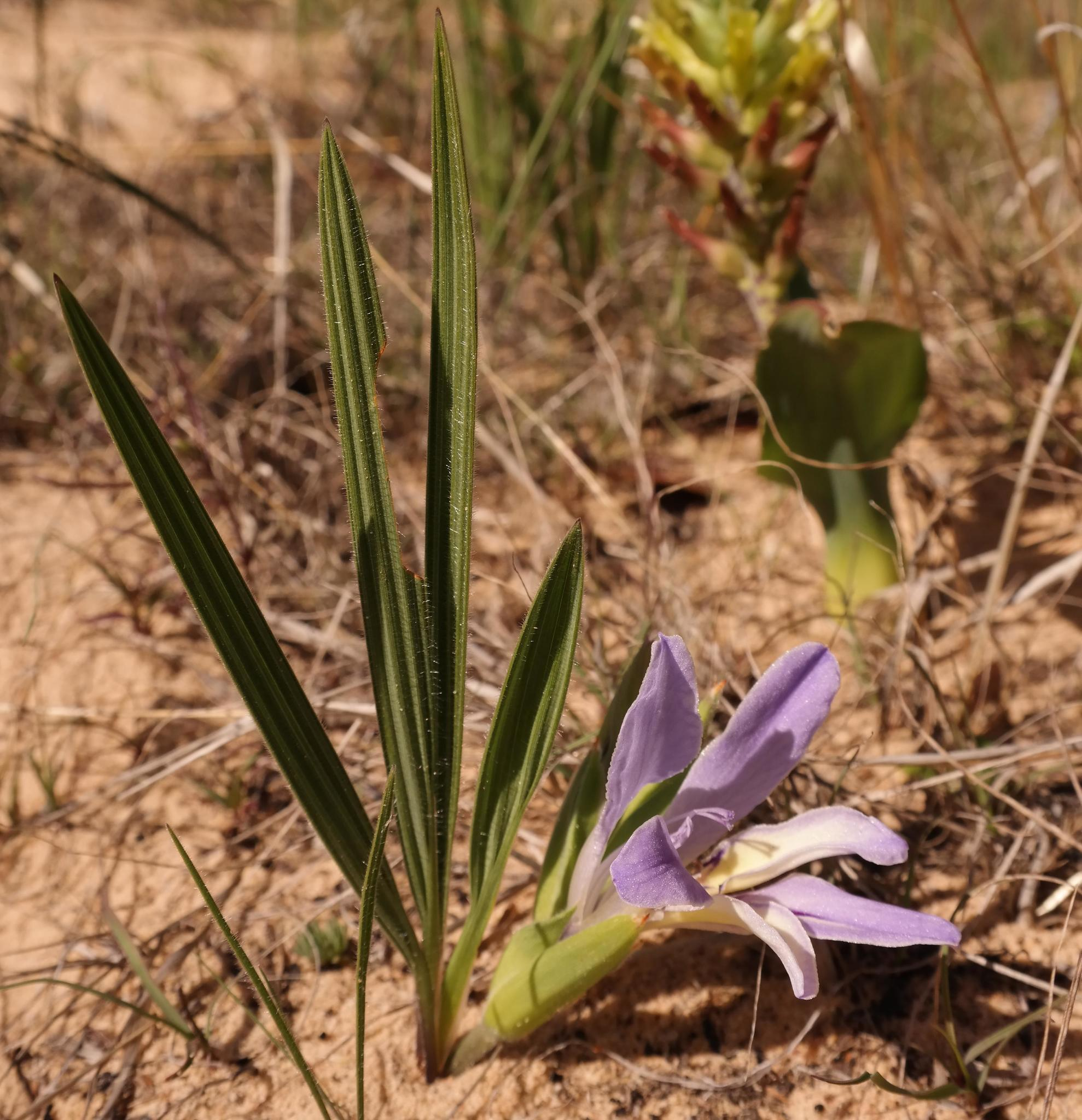
Babiana nana maculata

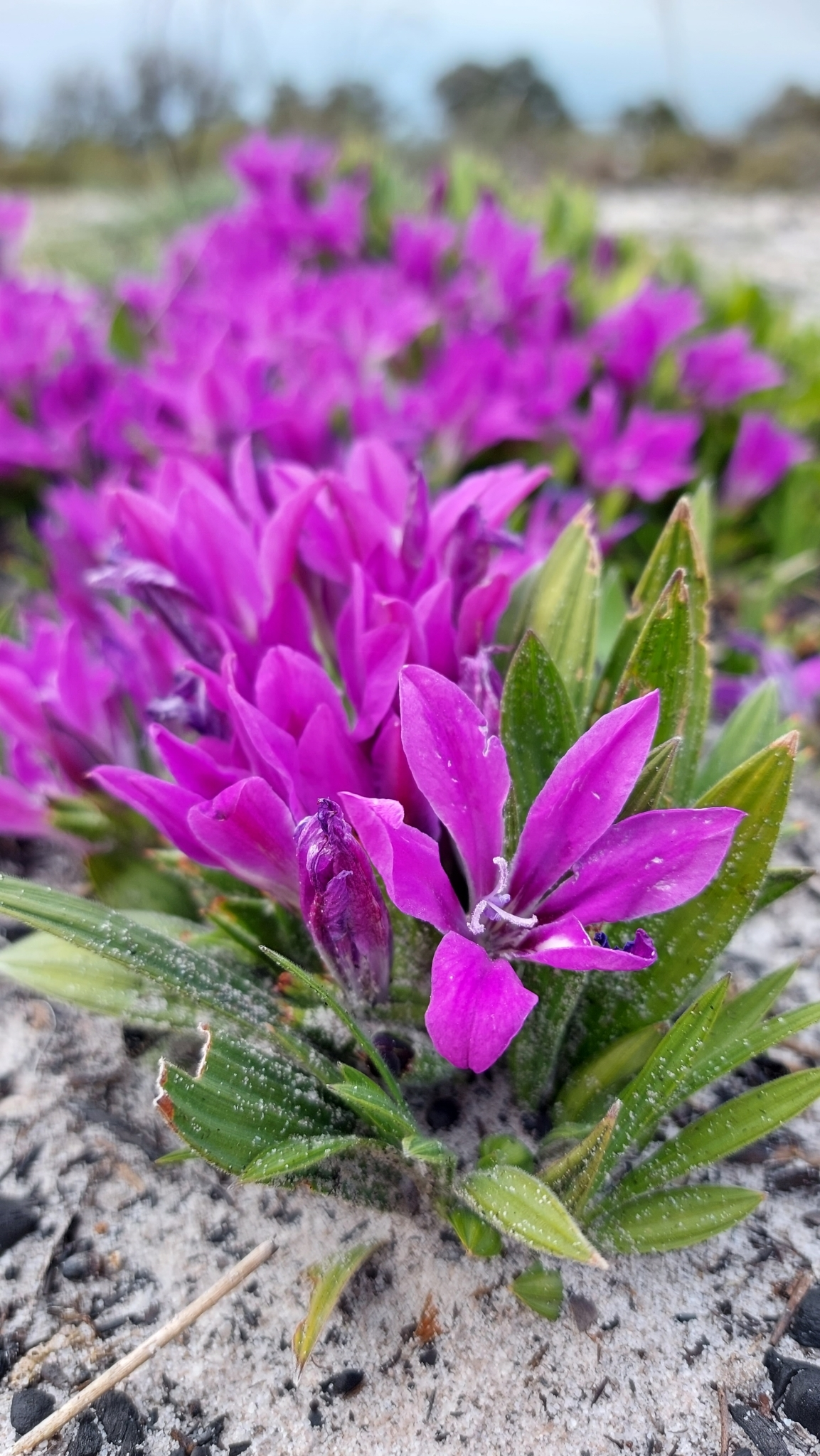
Babiana nana nana

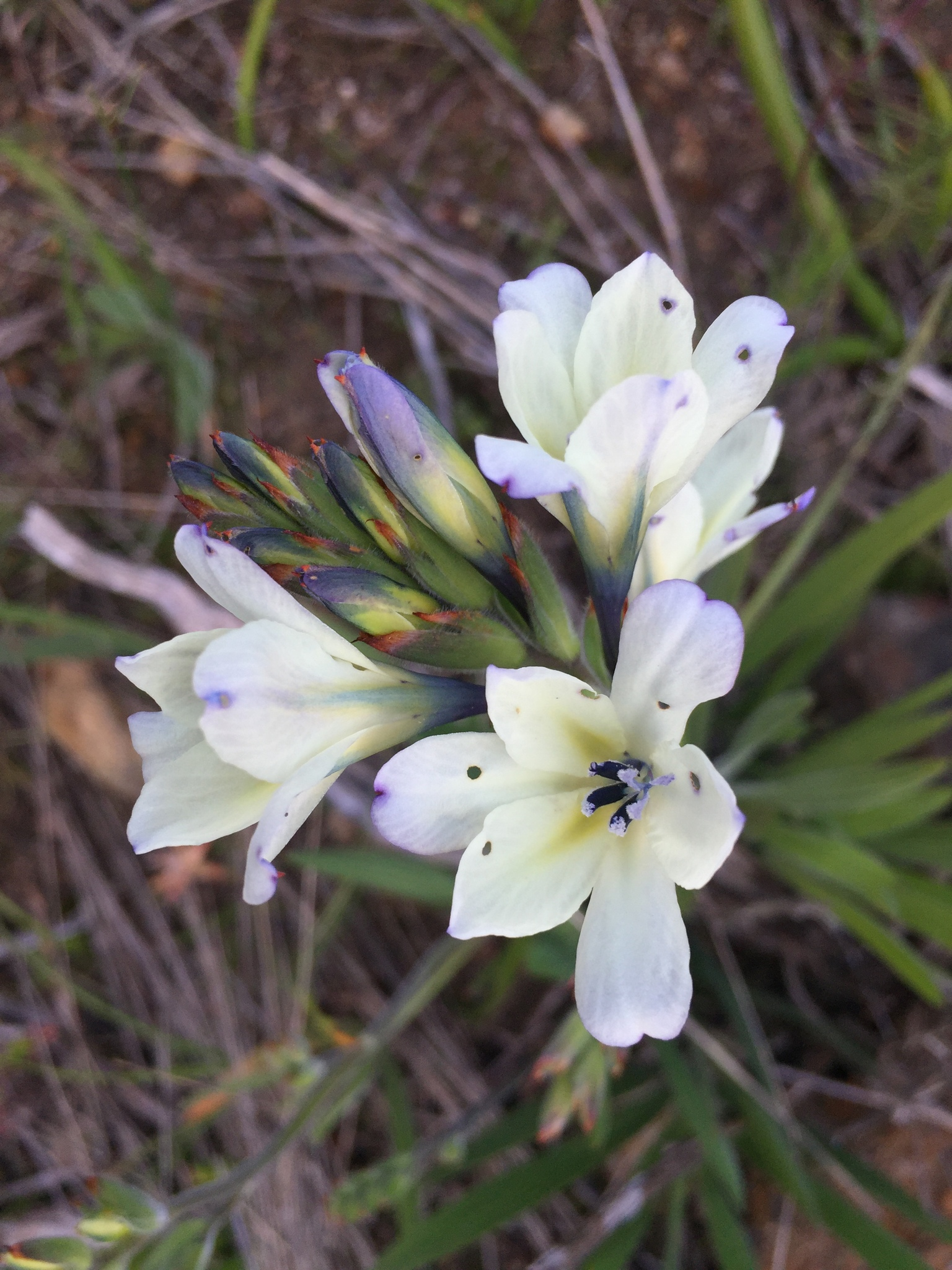
Babiana nervosa

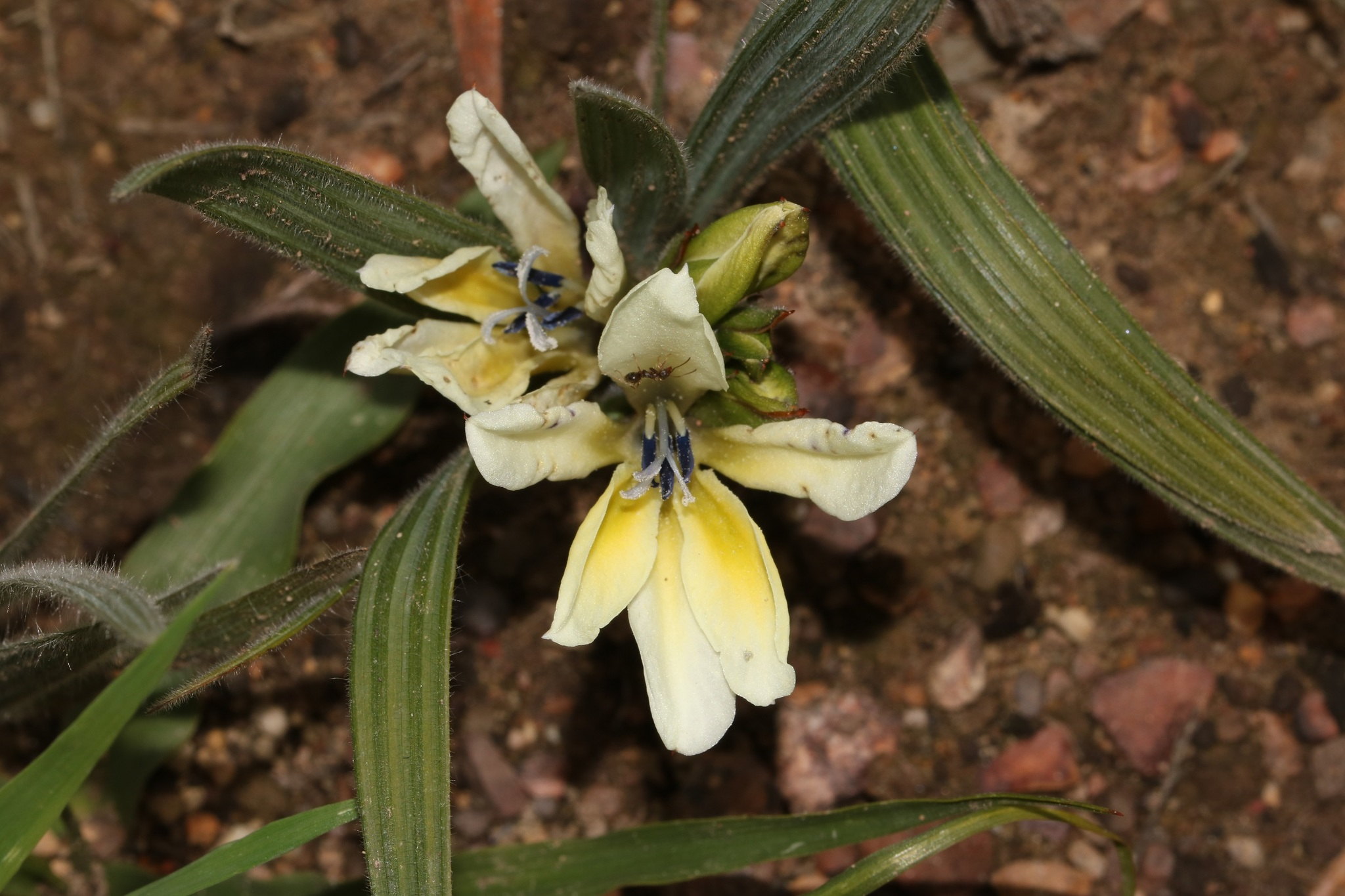
Babiana odorata

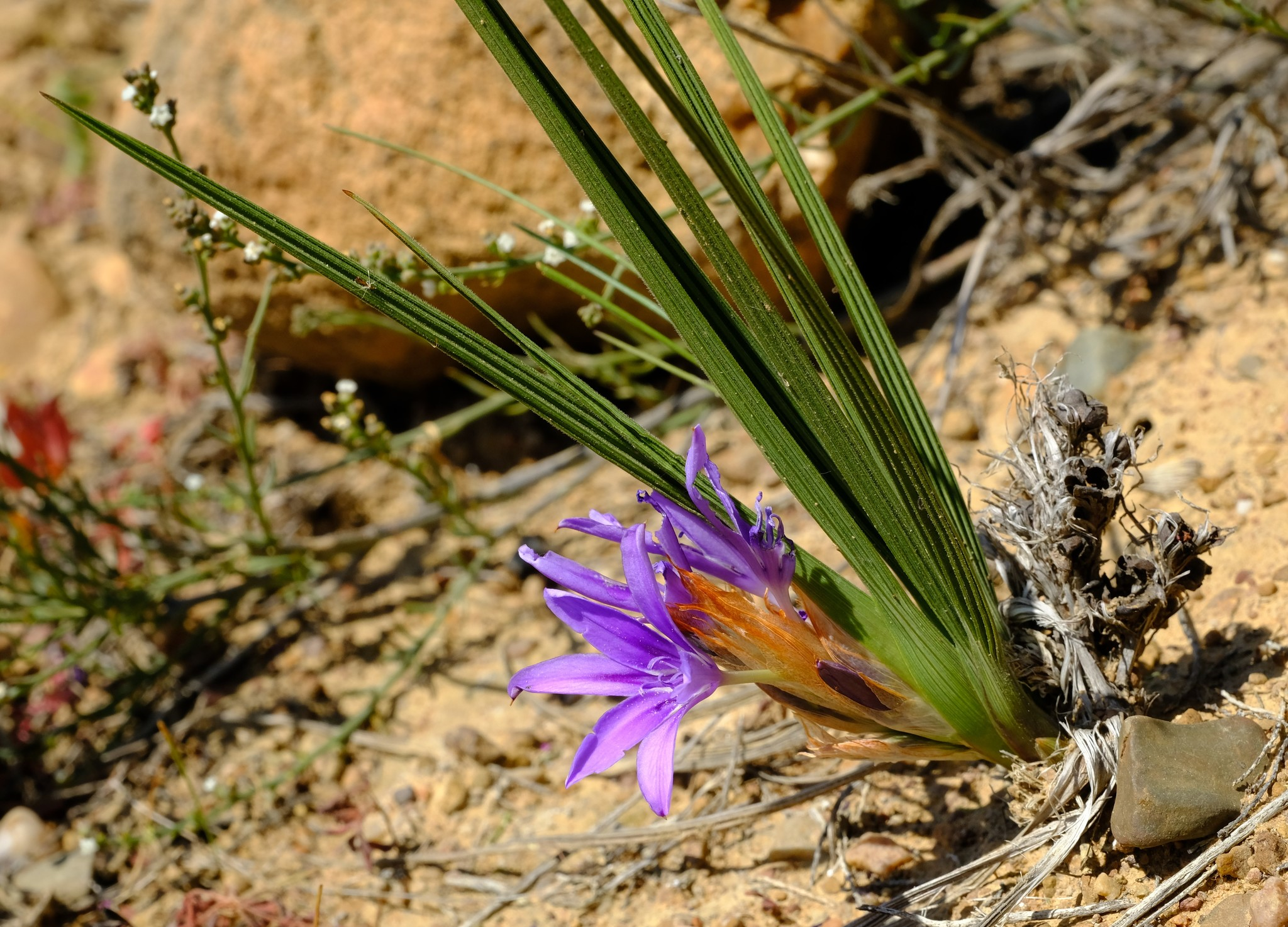
Babiana papyracea

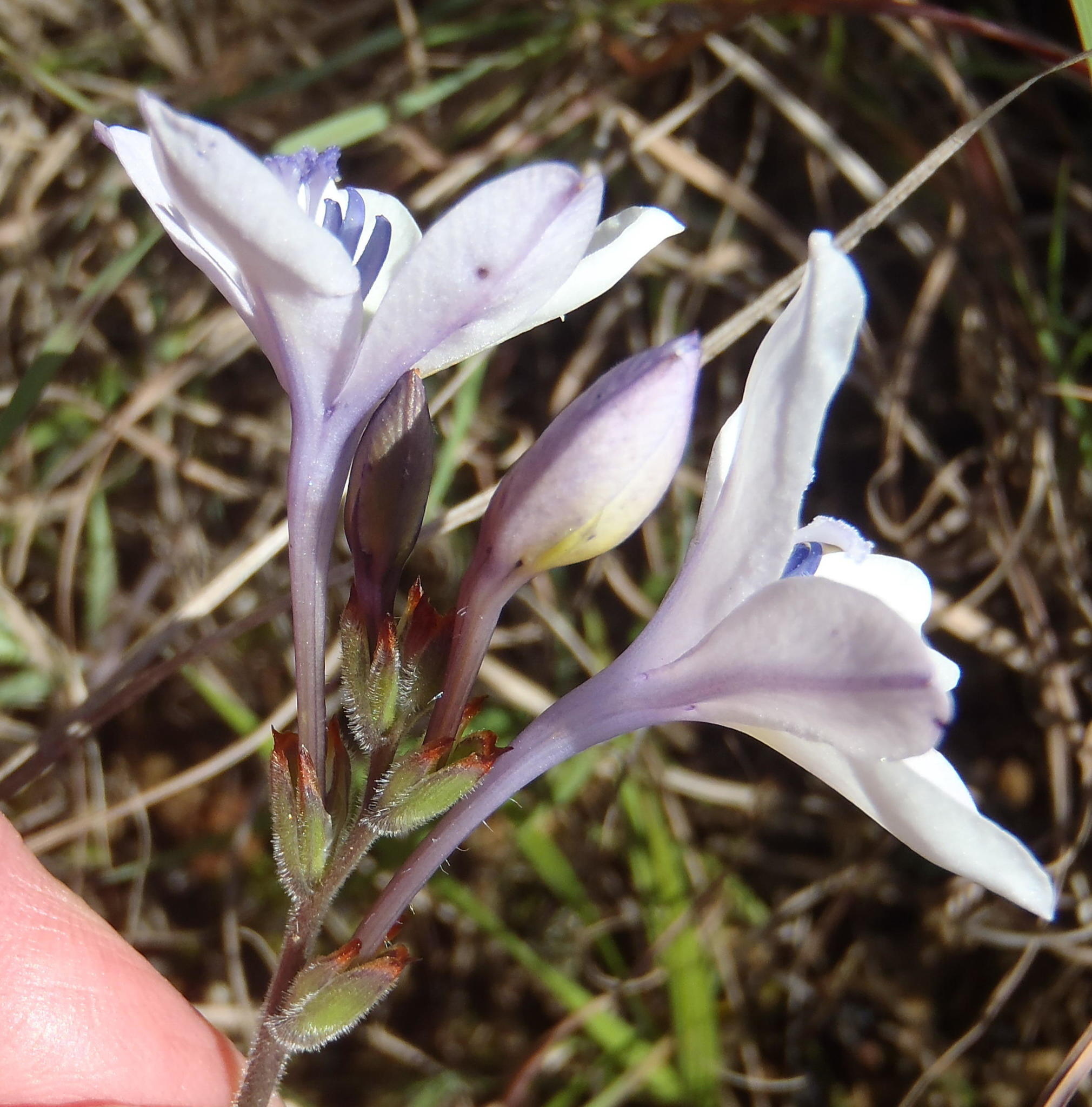
Babiana patersoniae

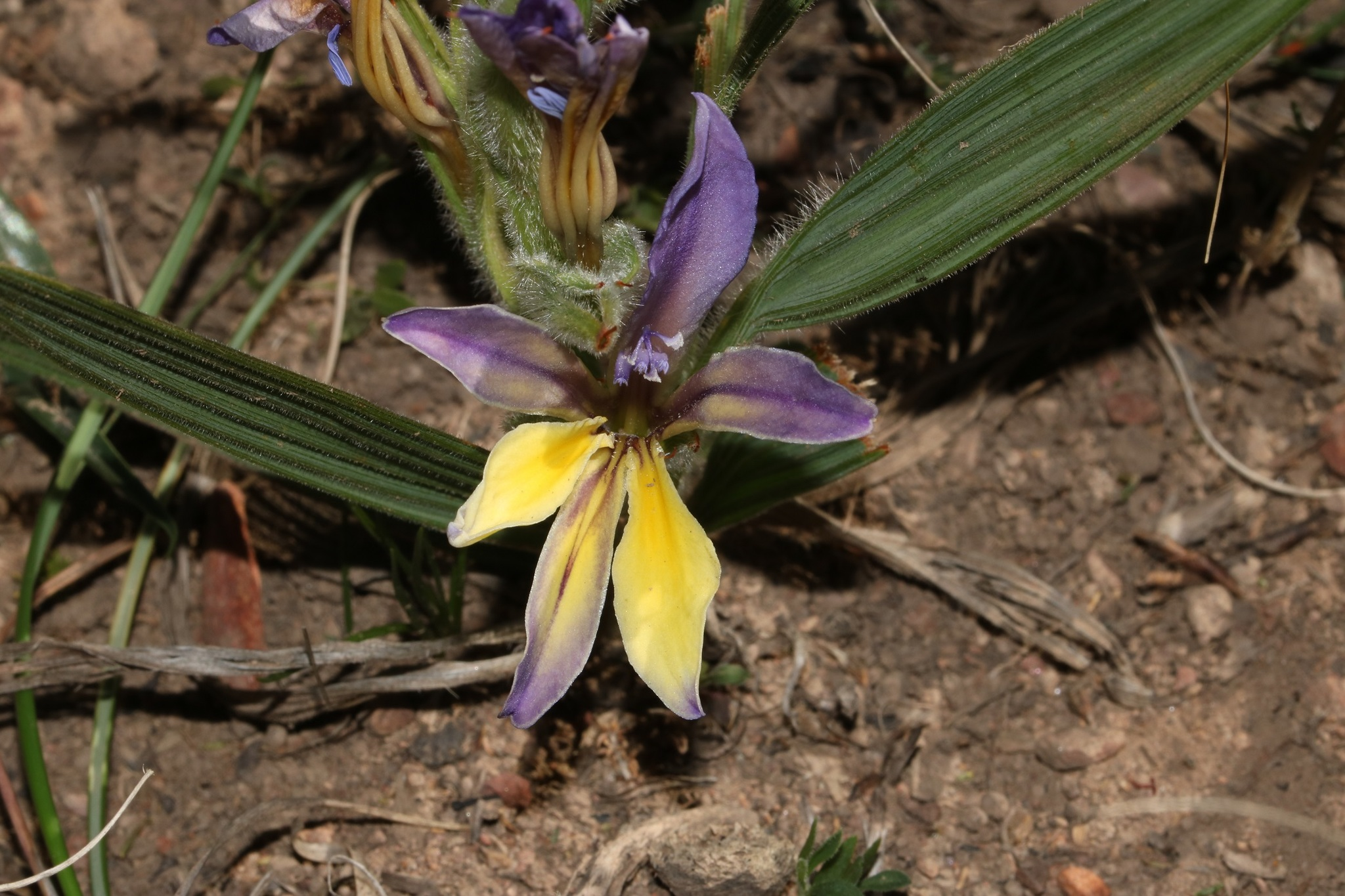
Babiana patula

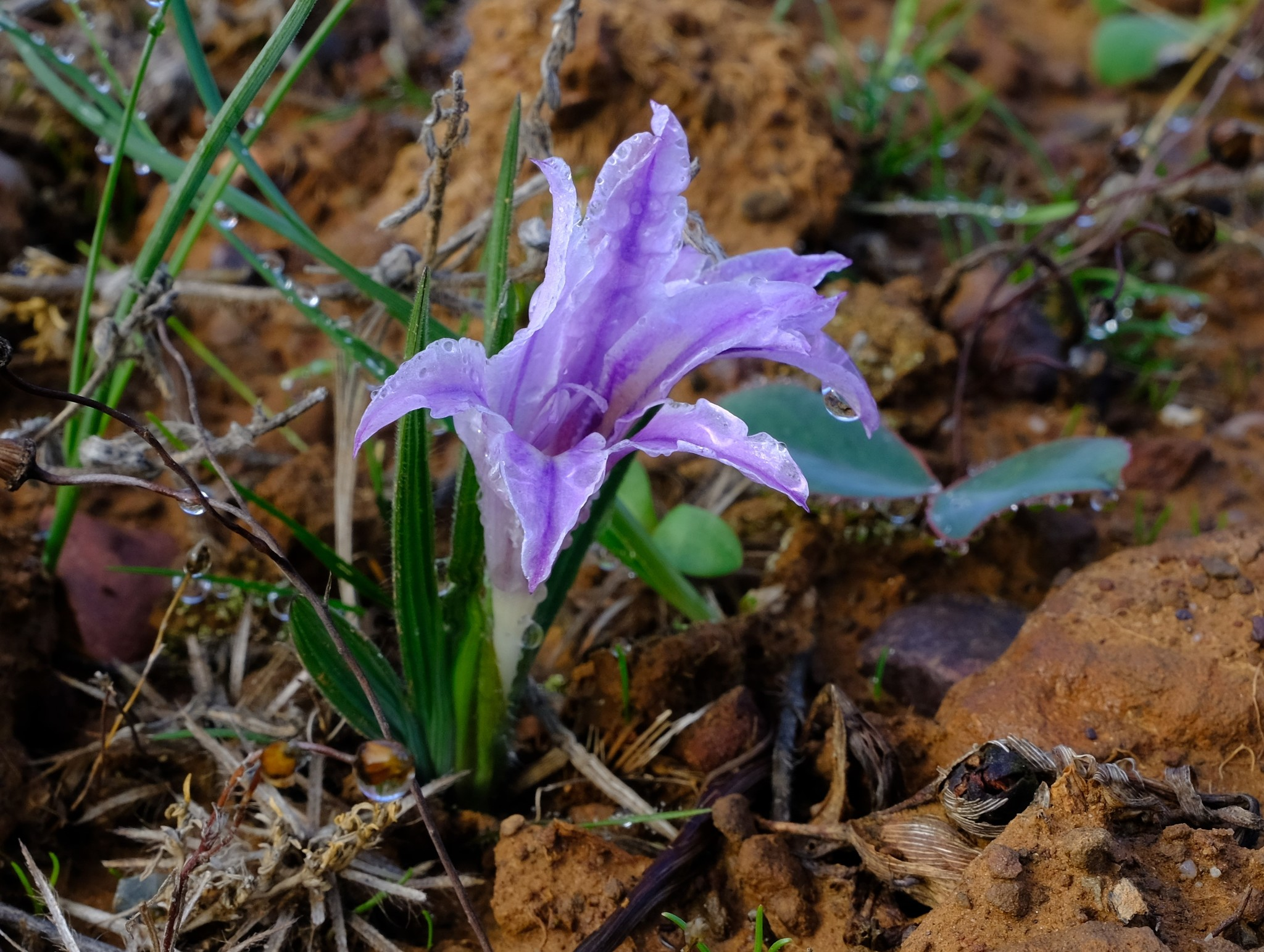
Babiana pauciflora

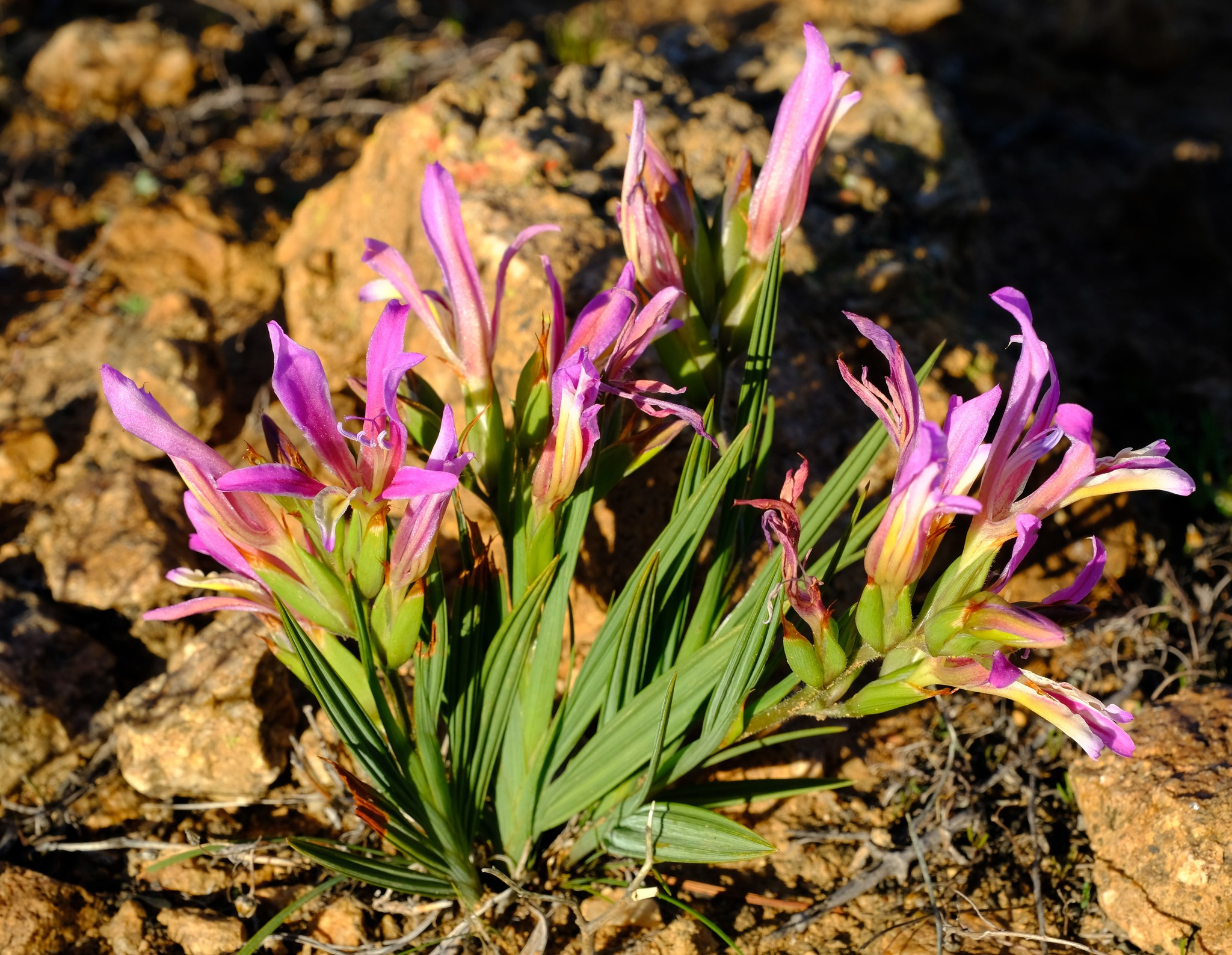
Babiana pilosa

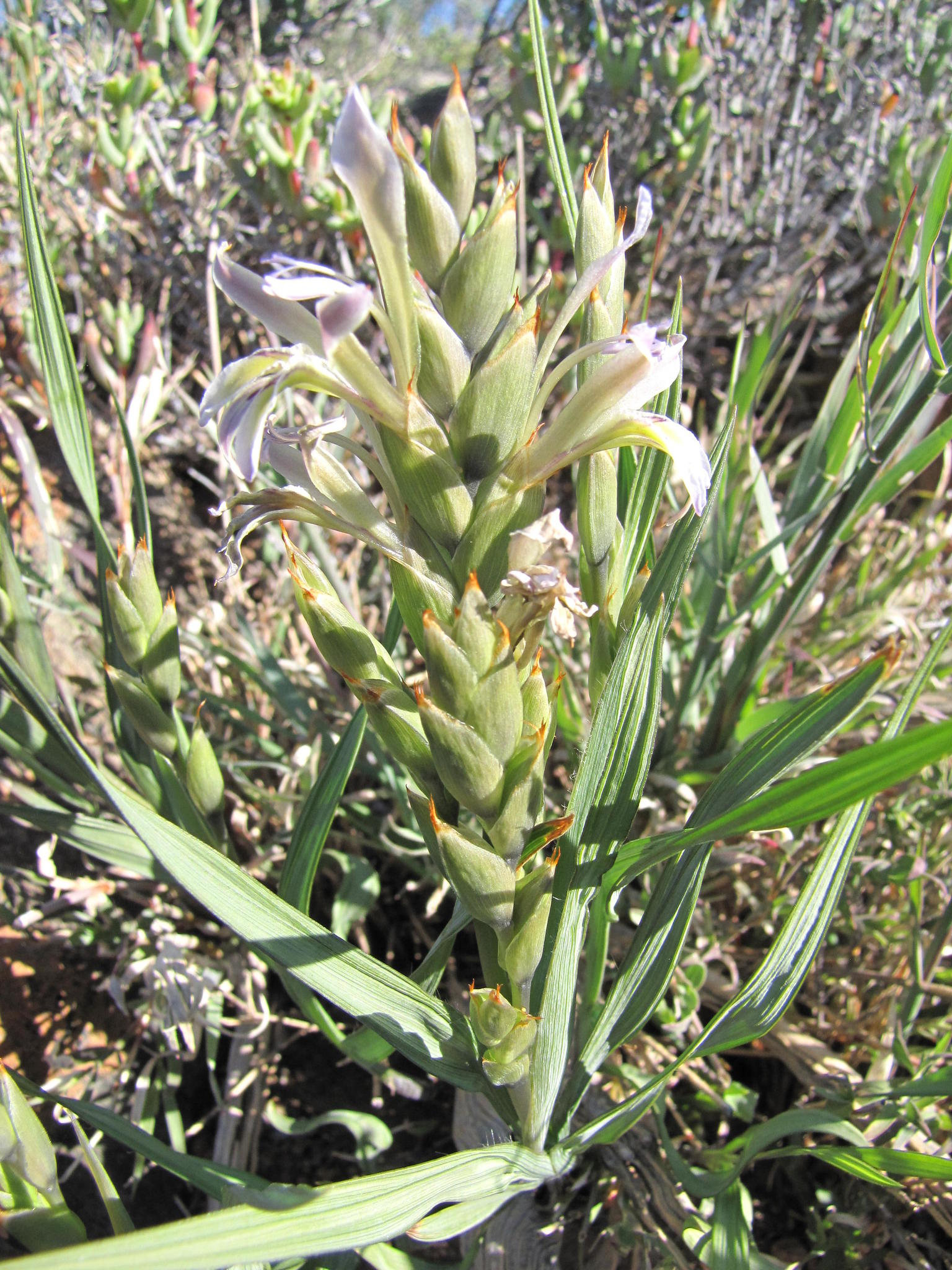
Babiana planifolia

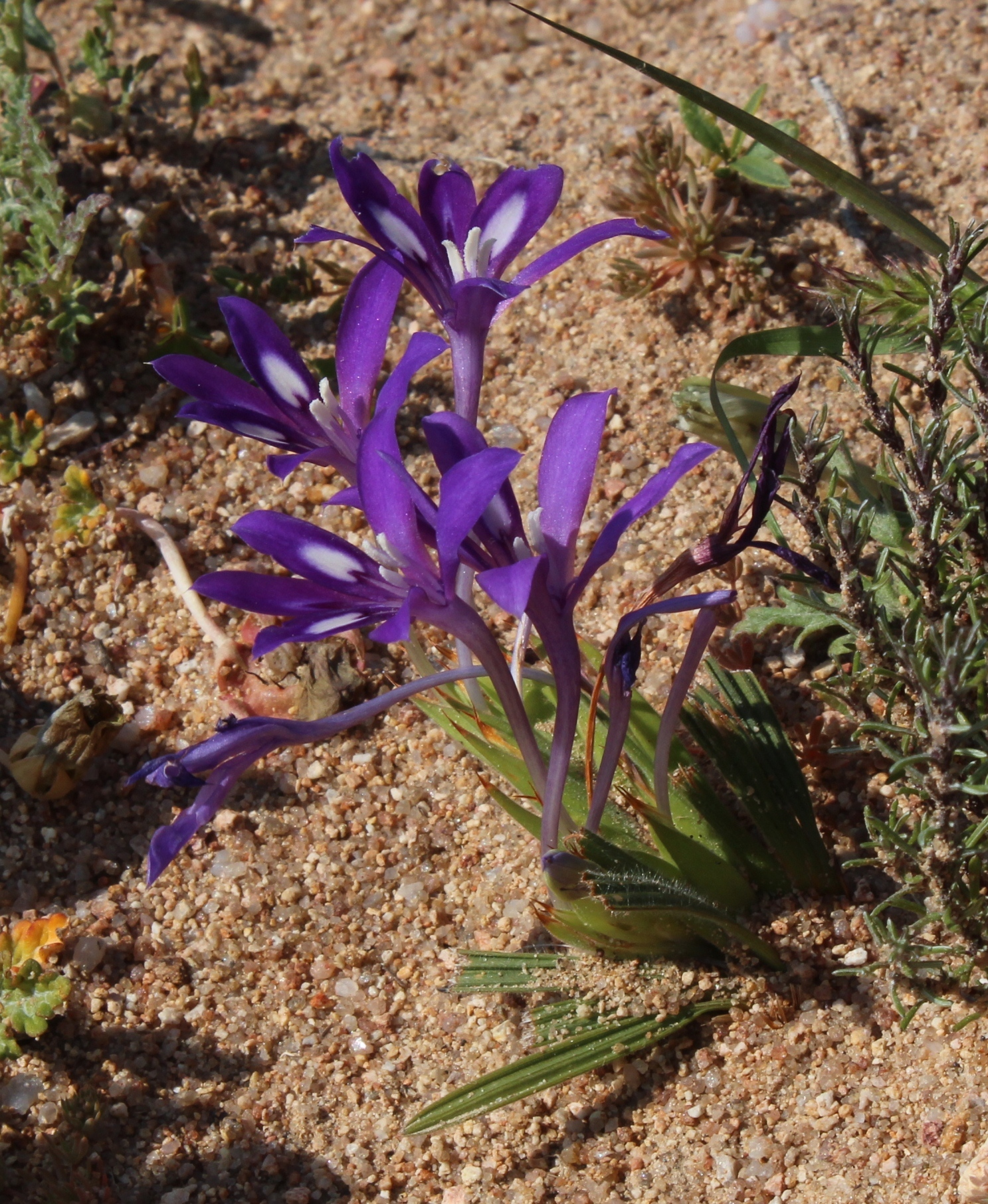
Babiana praemorsa

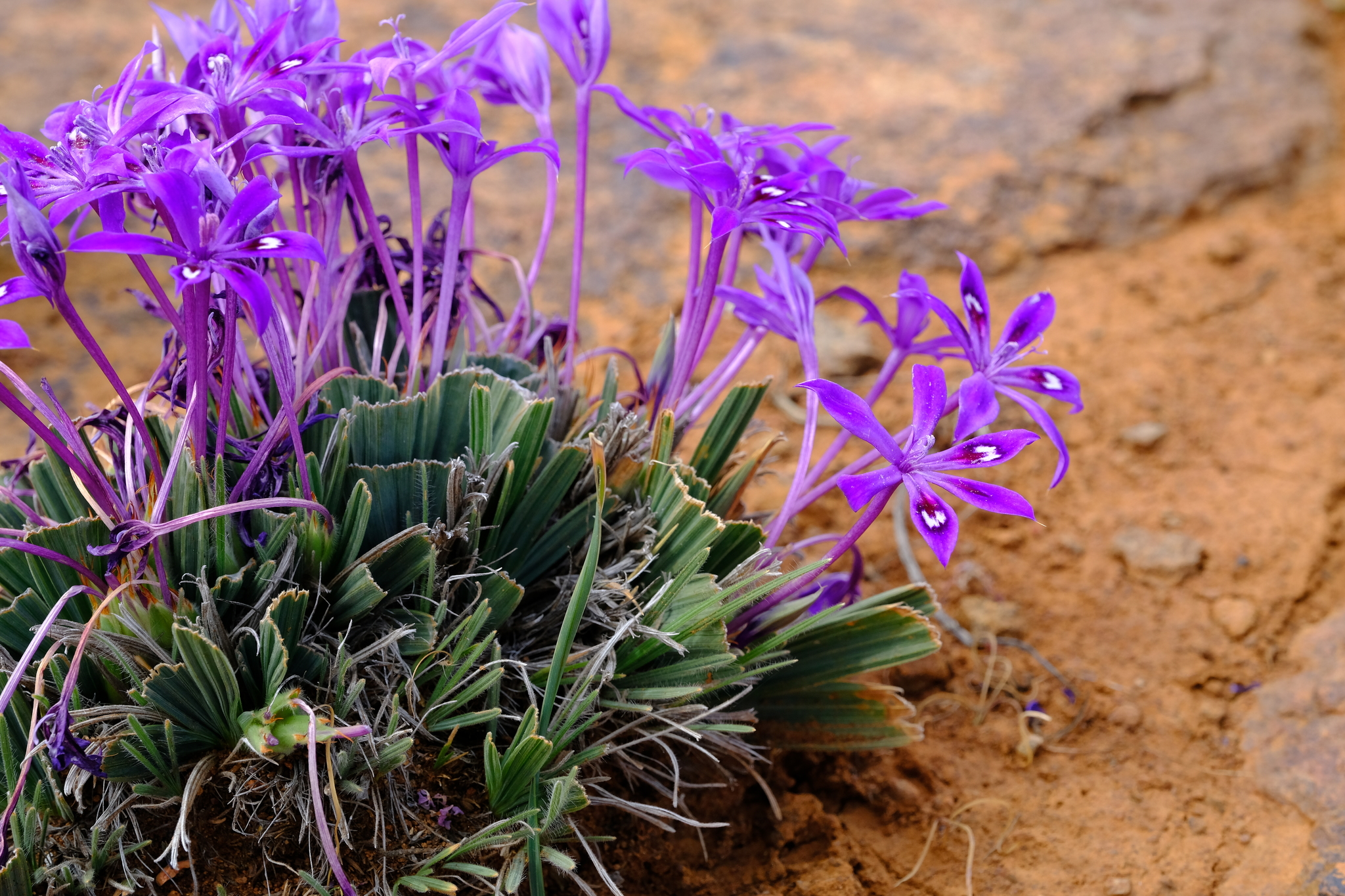
Babiana pubescens

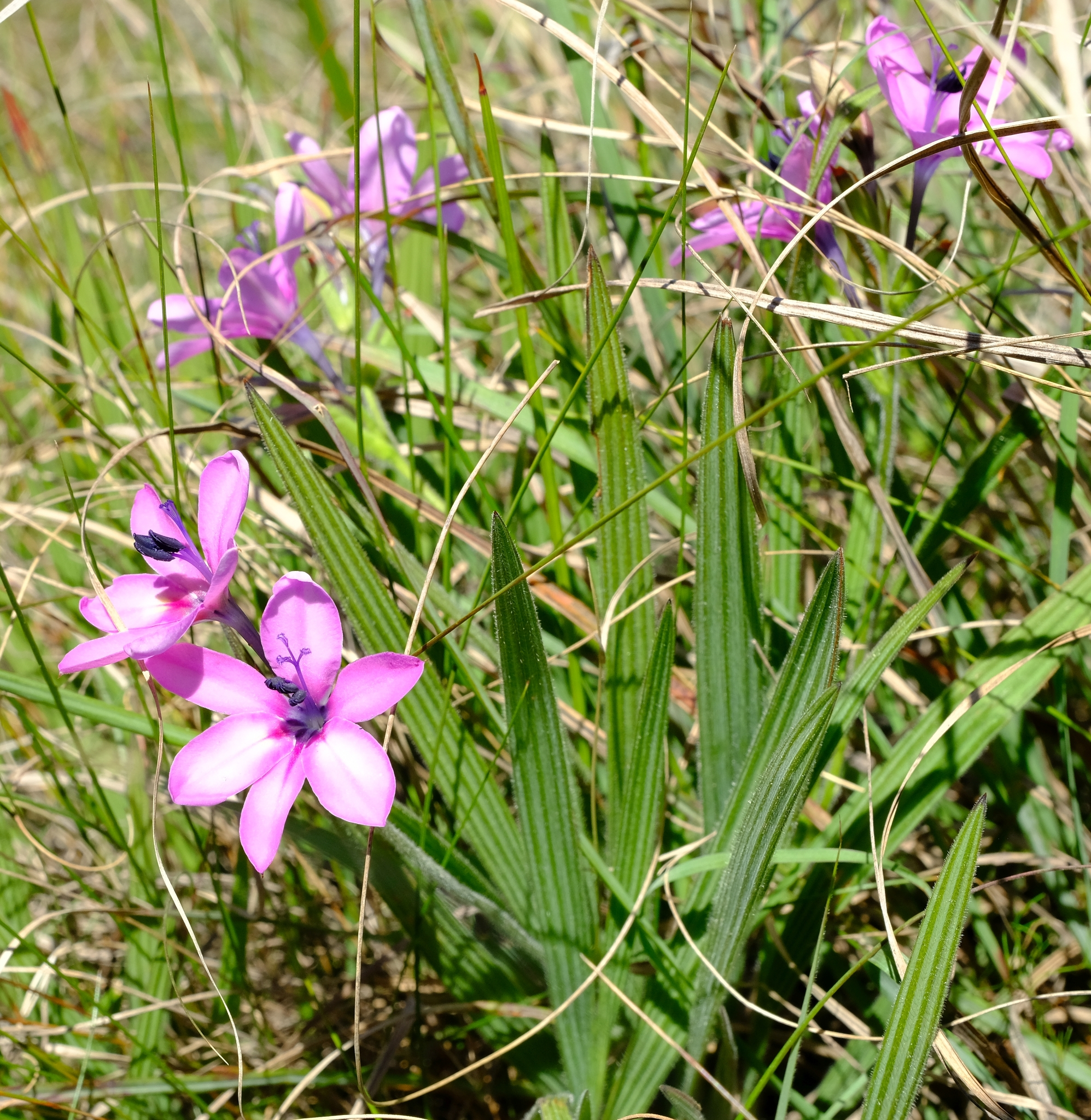
Babiana purpurea

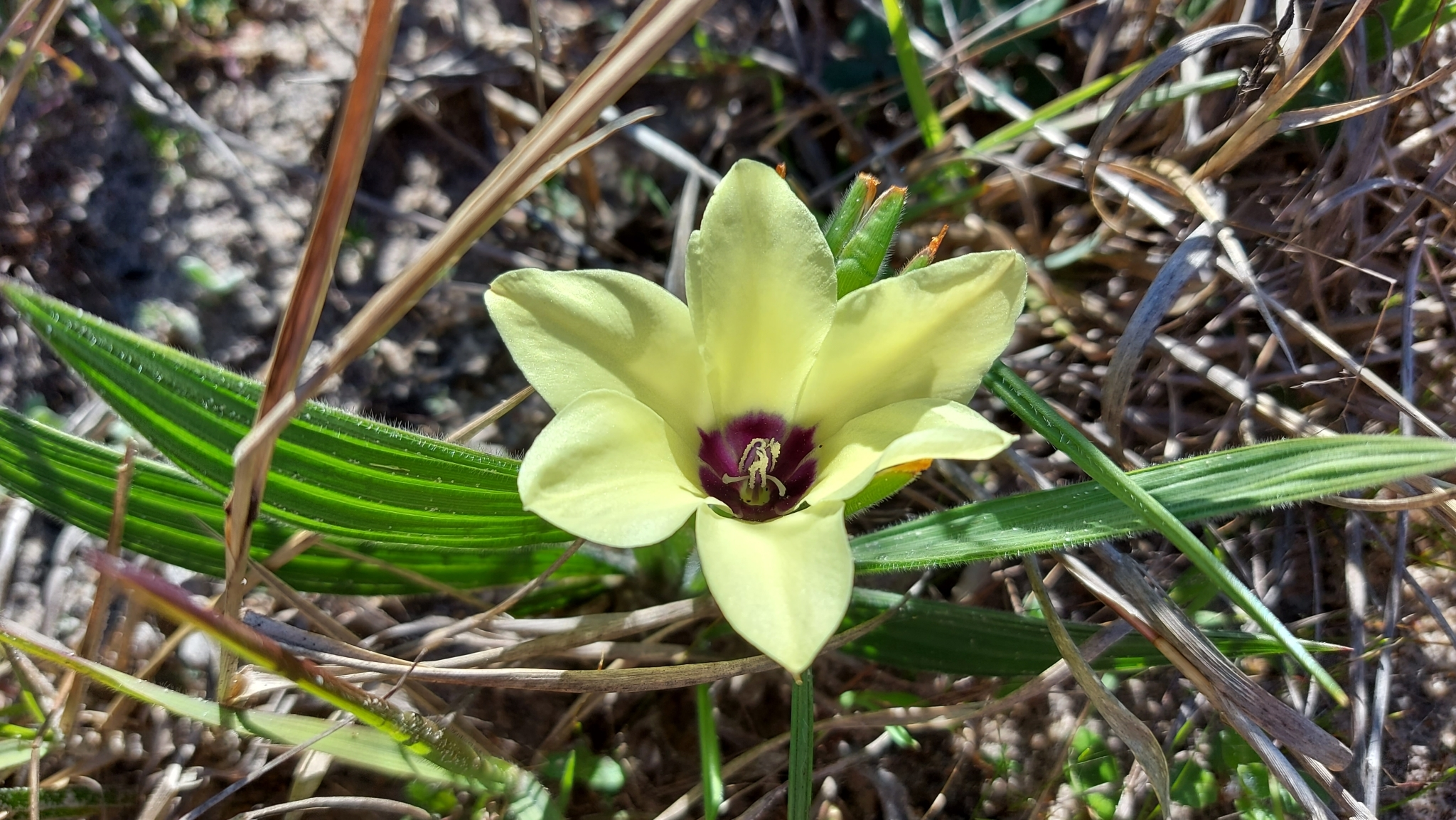
Babiana pygmaea

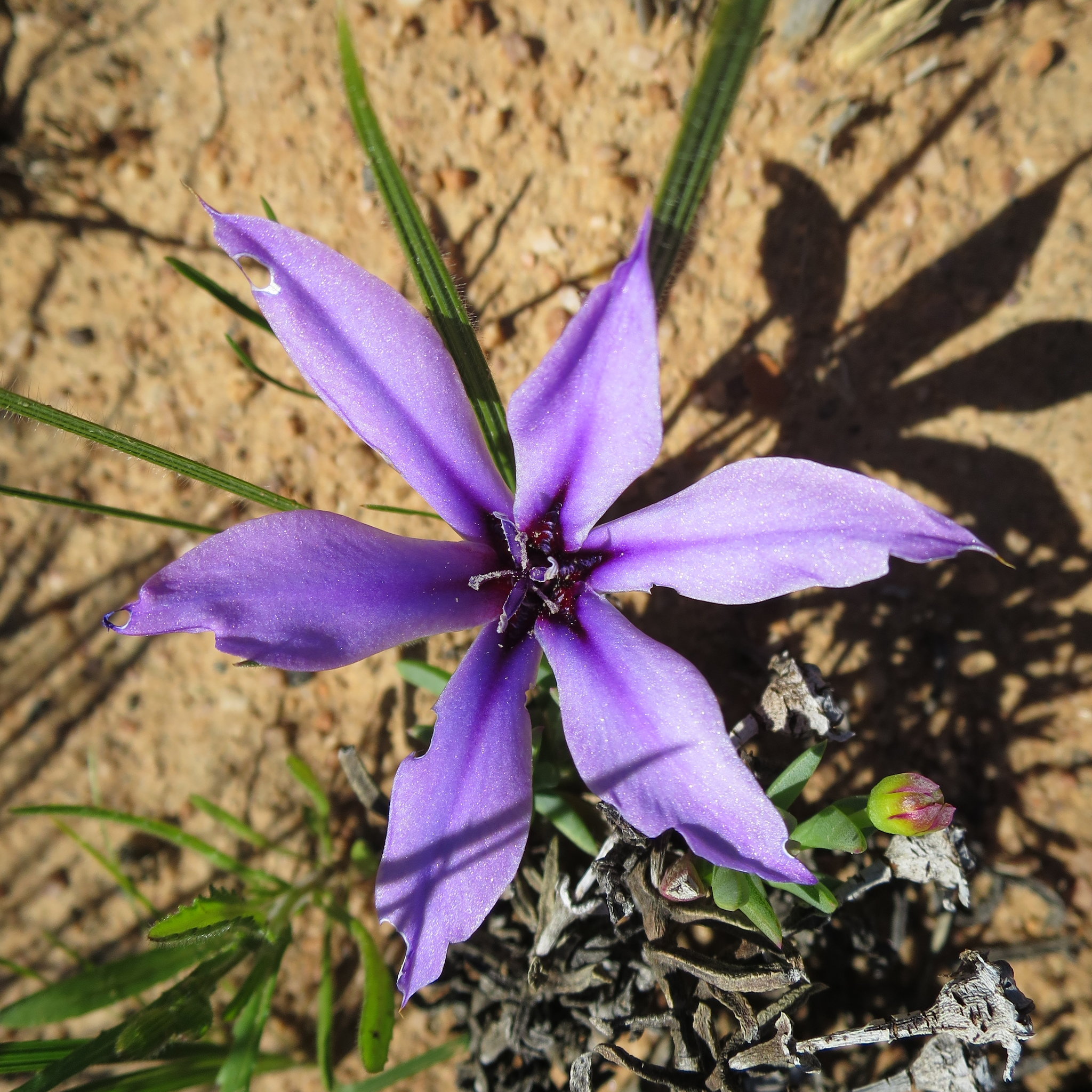
Babiana radiata

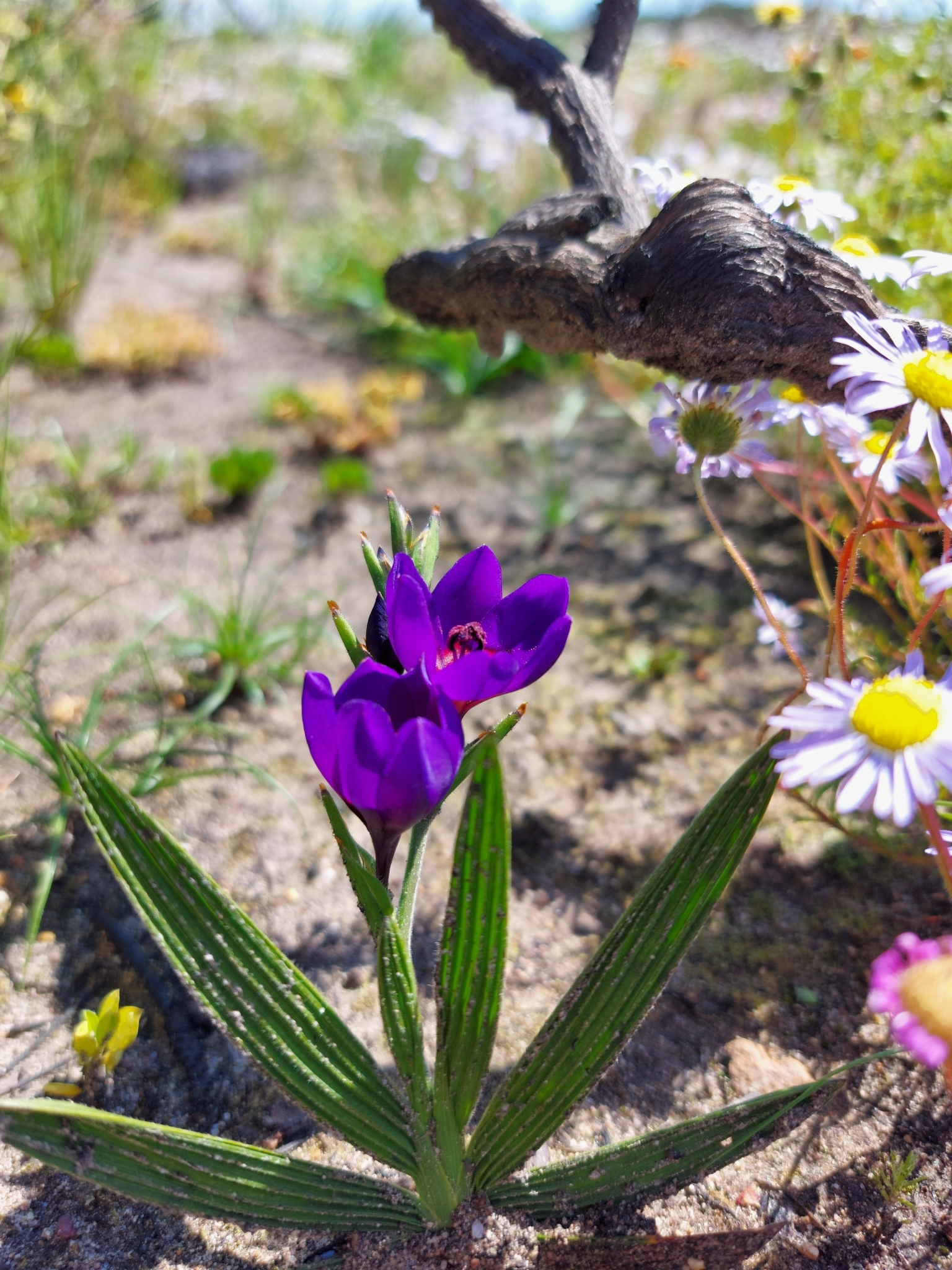
Babiana regia

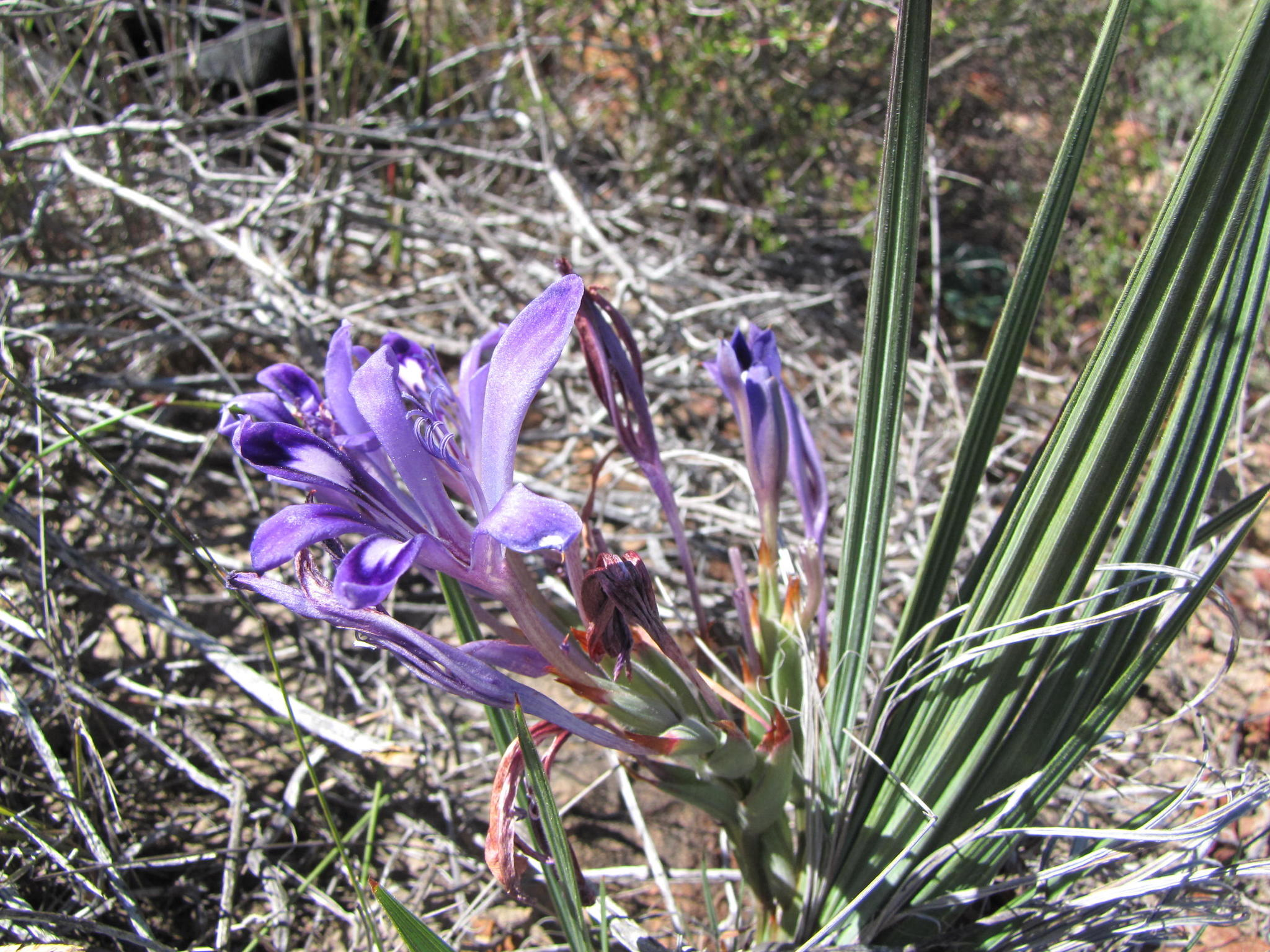
Babiana rigidifolia

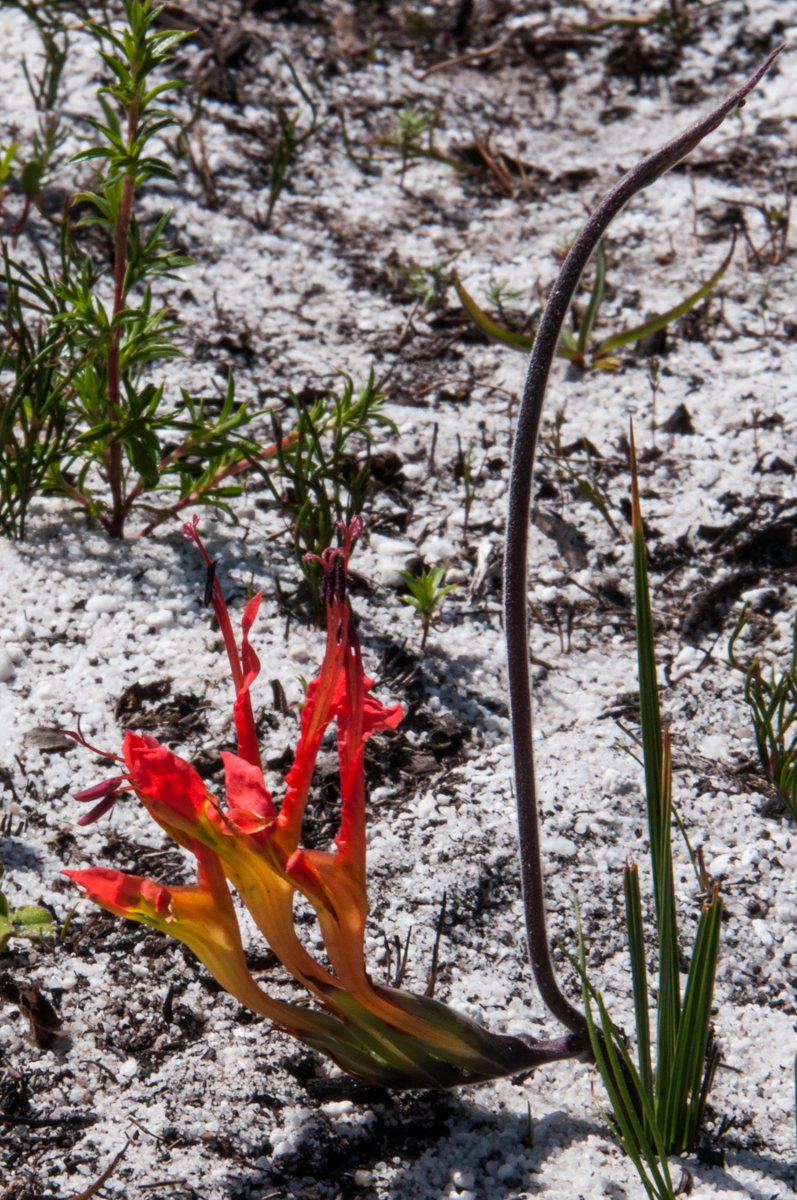
Babiana ringens australis

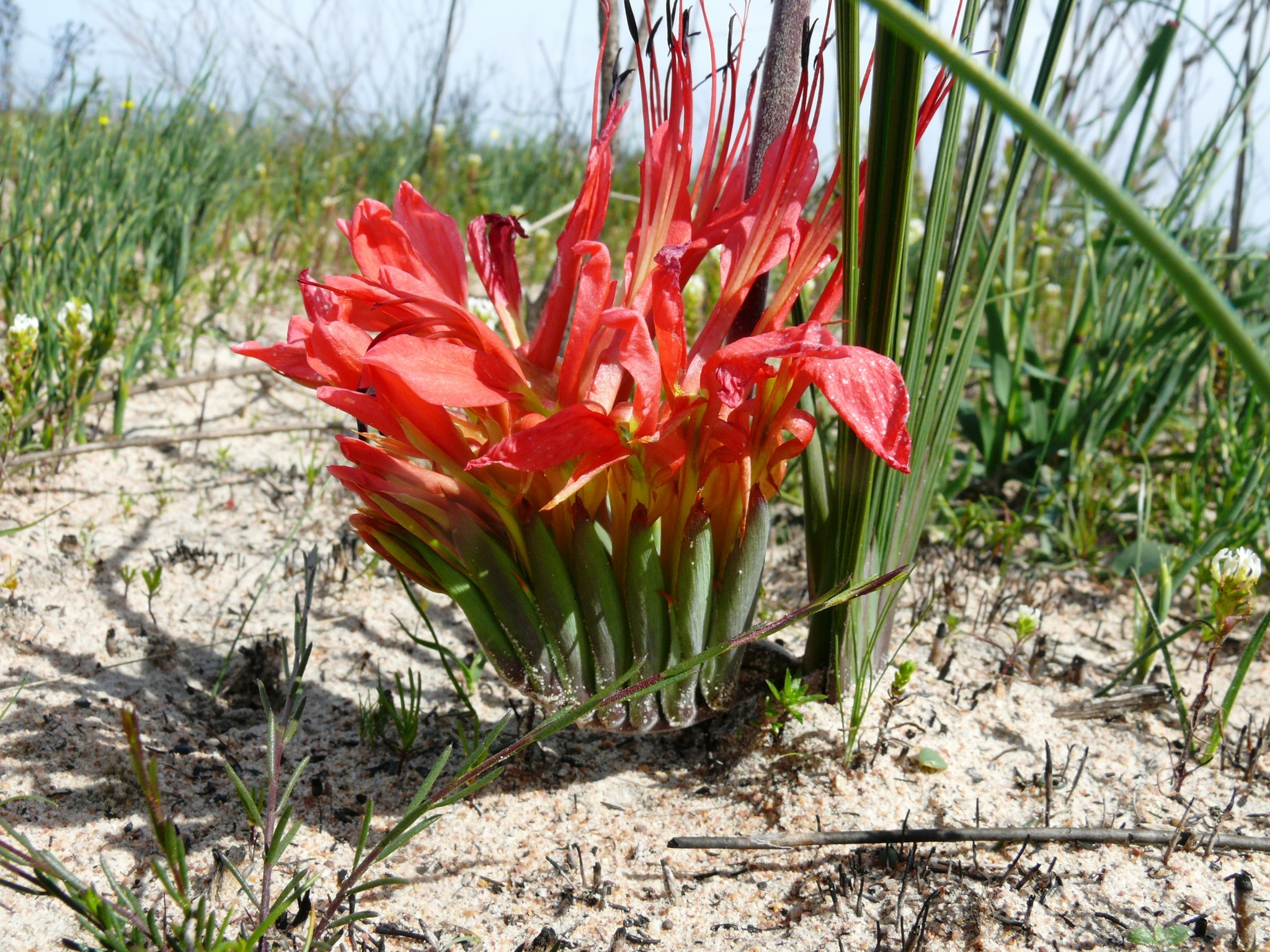
Babiana ringens ringens

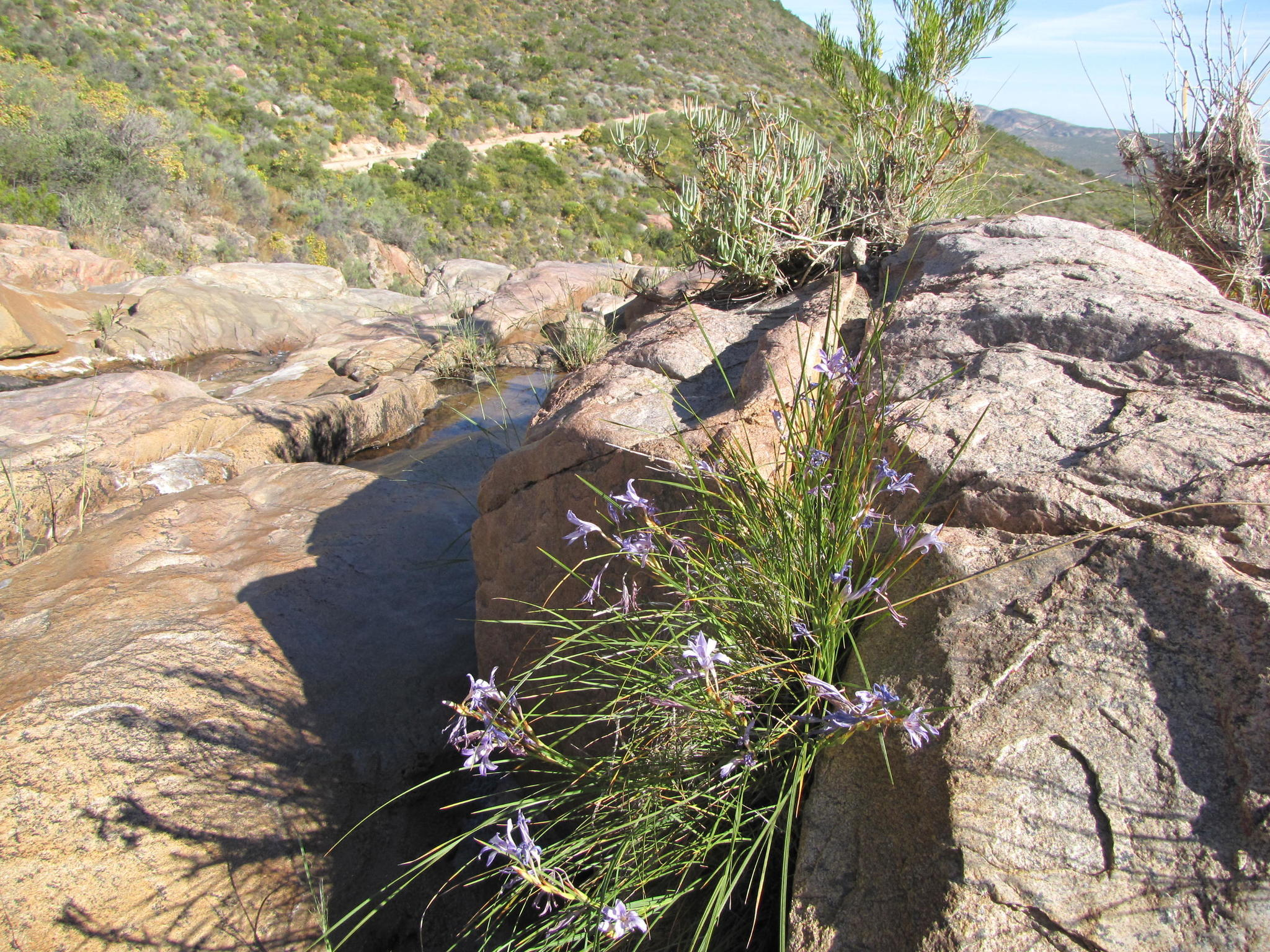
Babiana rivulicola

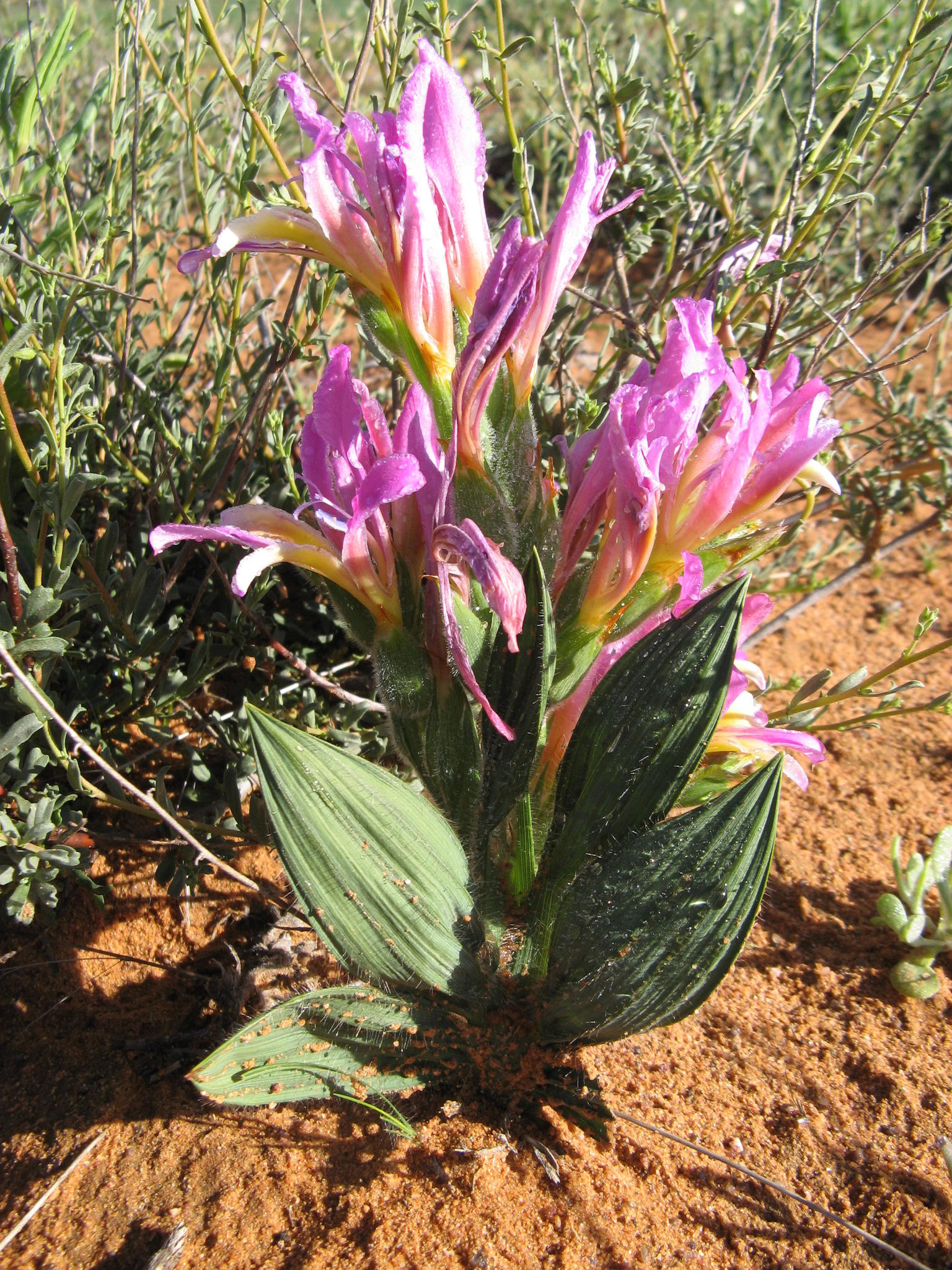
Babiana rubella

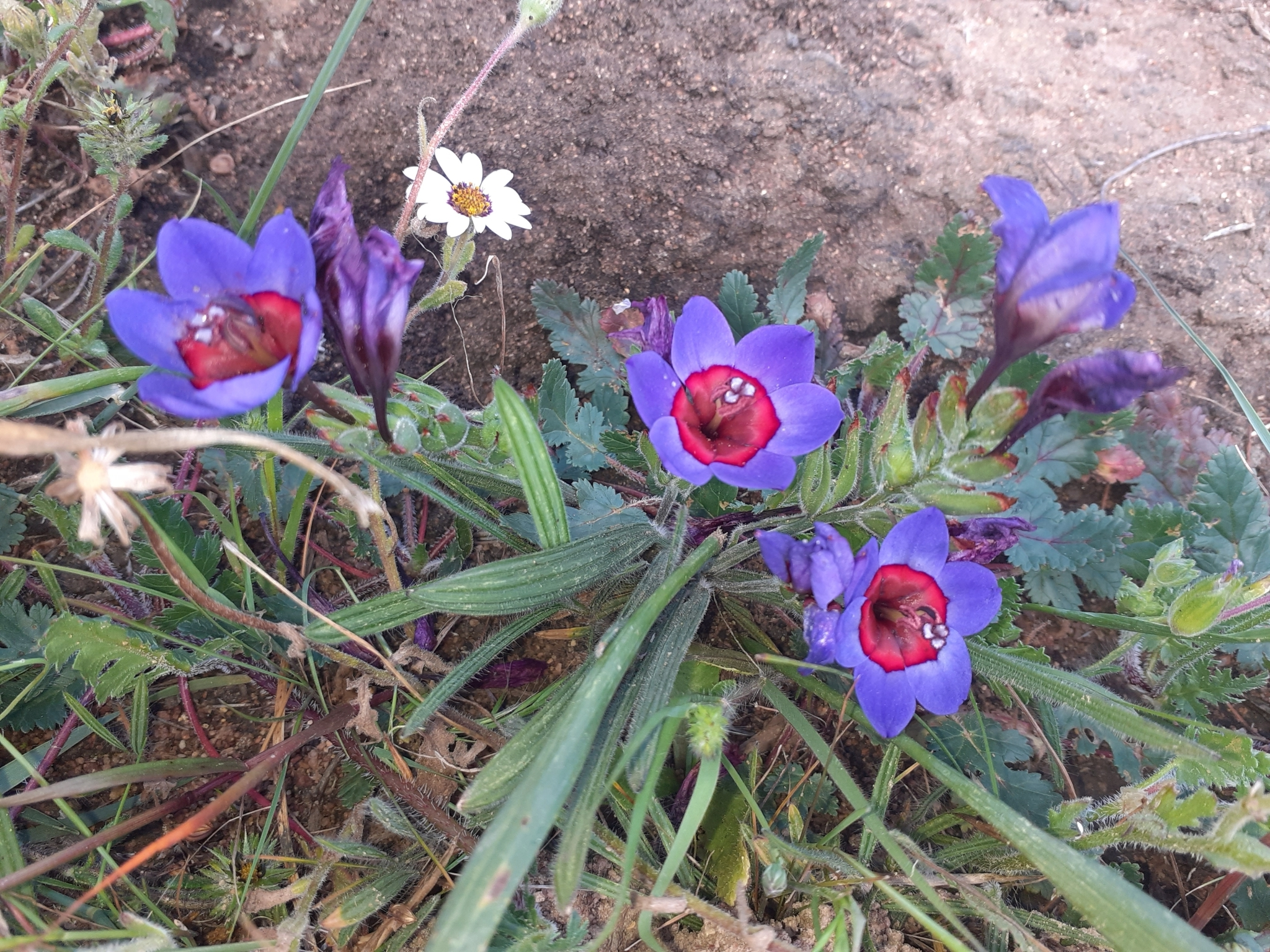
Babiana rubrocyanea

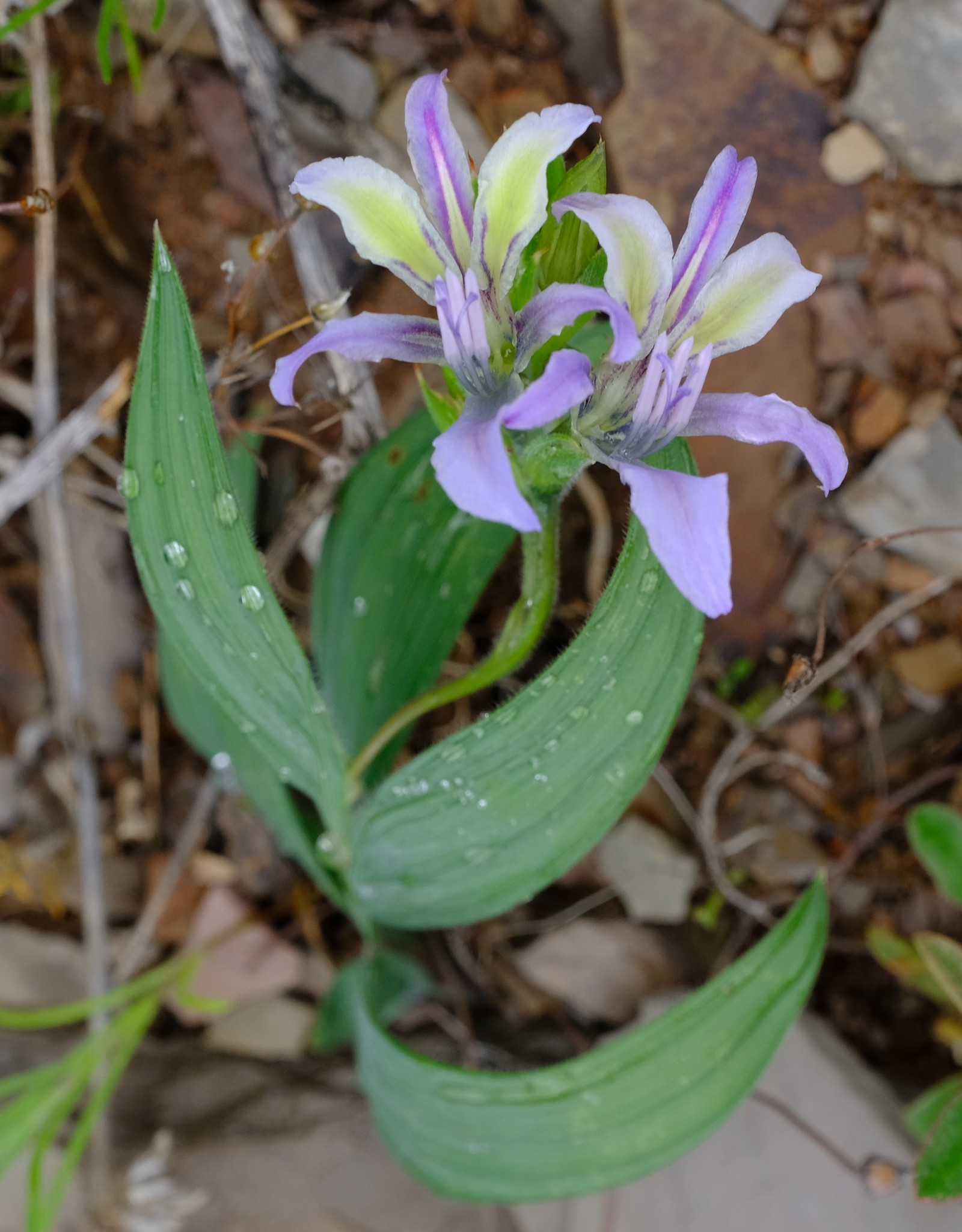
Babiana salteri

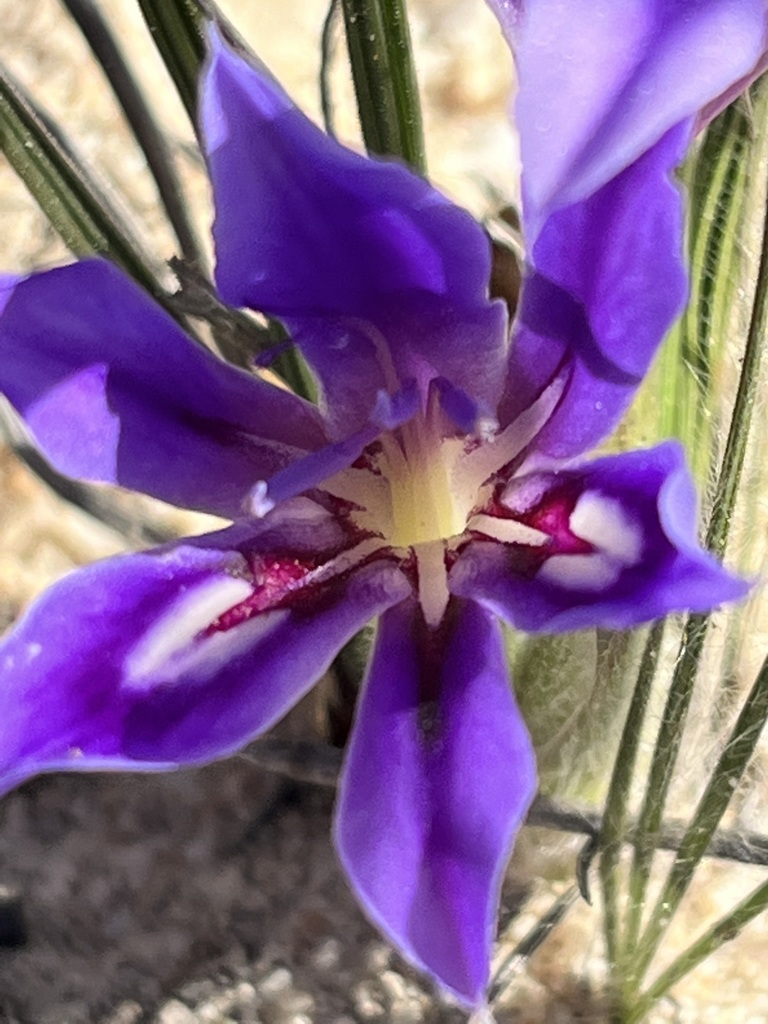
Babiana sambucina ssp. longibracteata

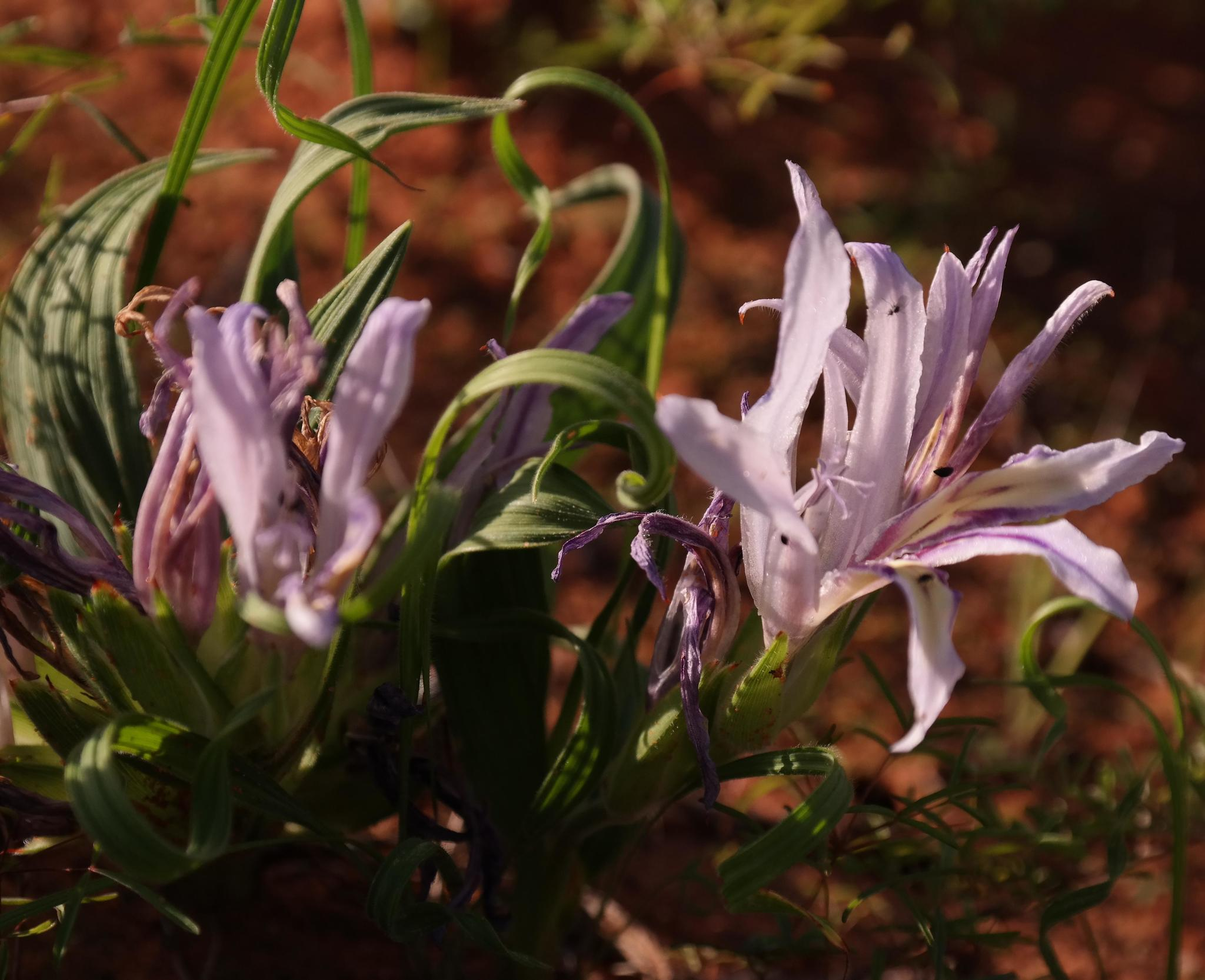
Babiana scabrifolia

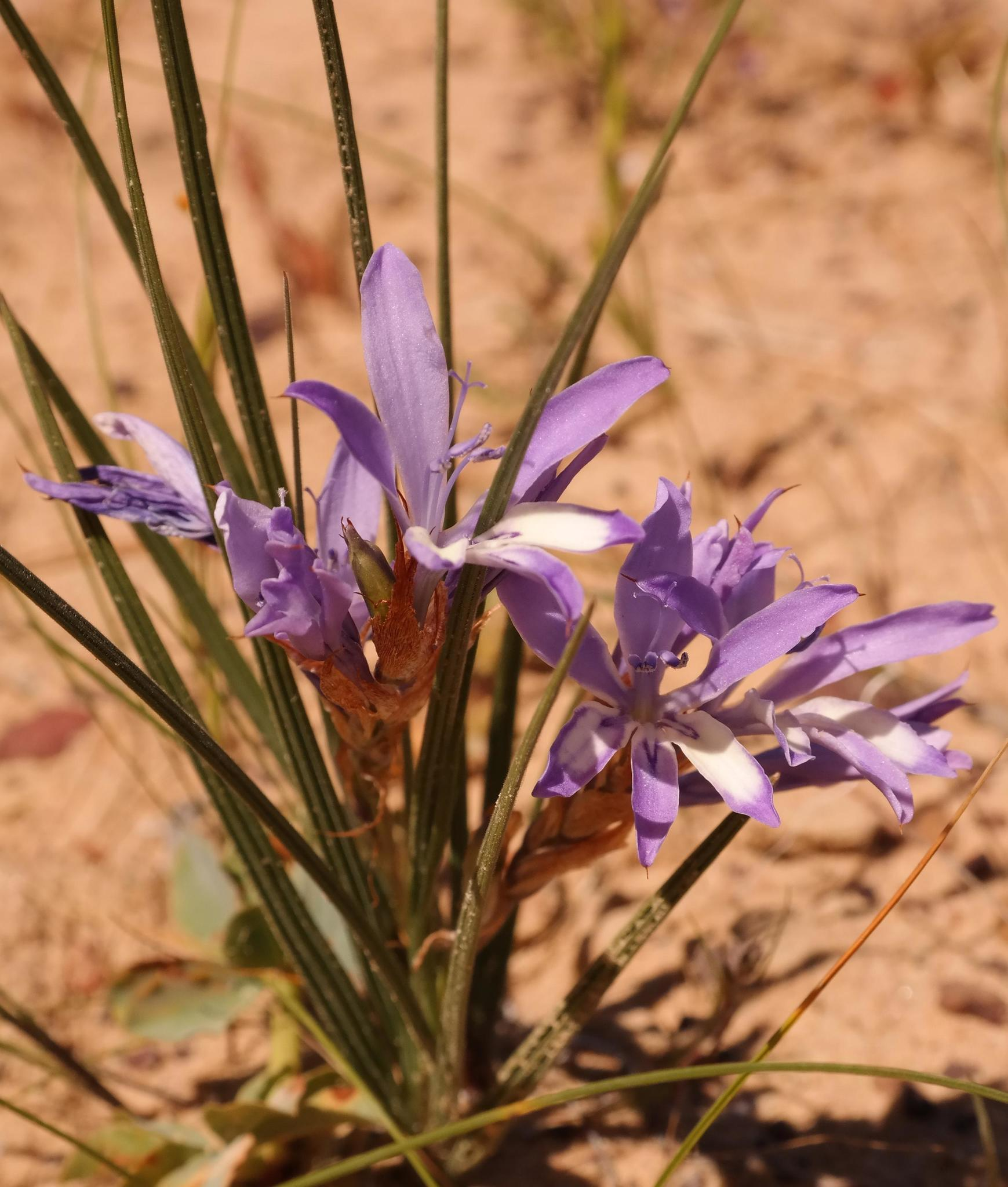
Babiana scariosa

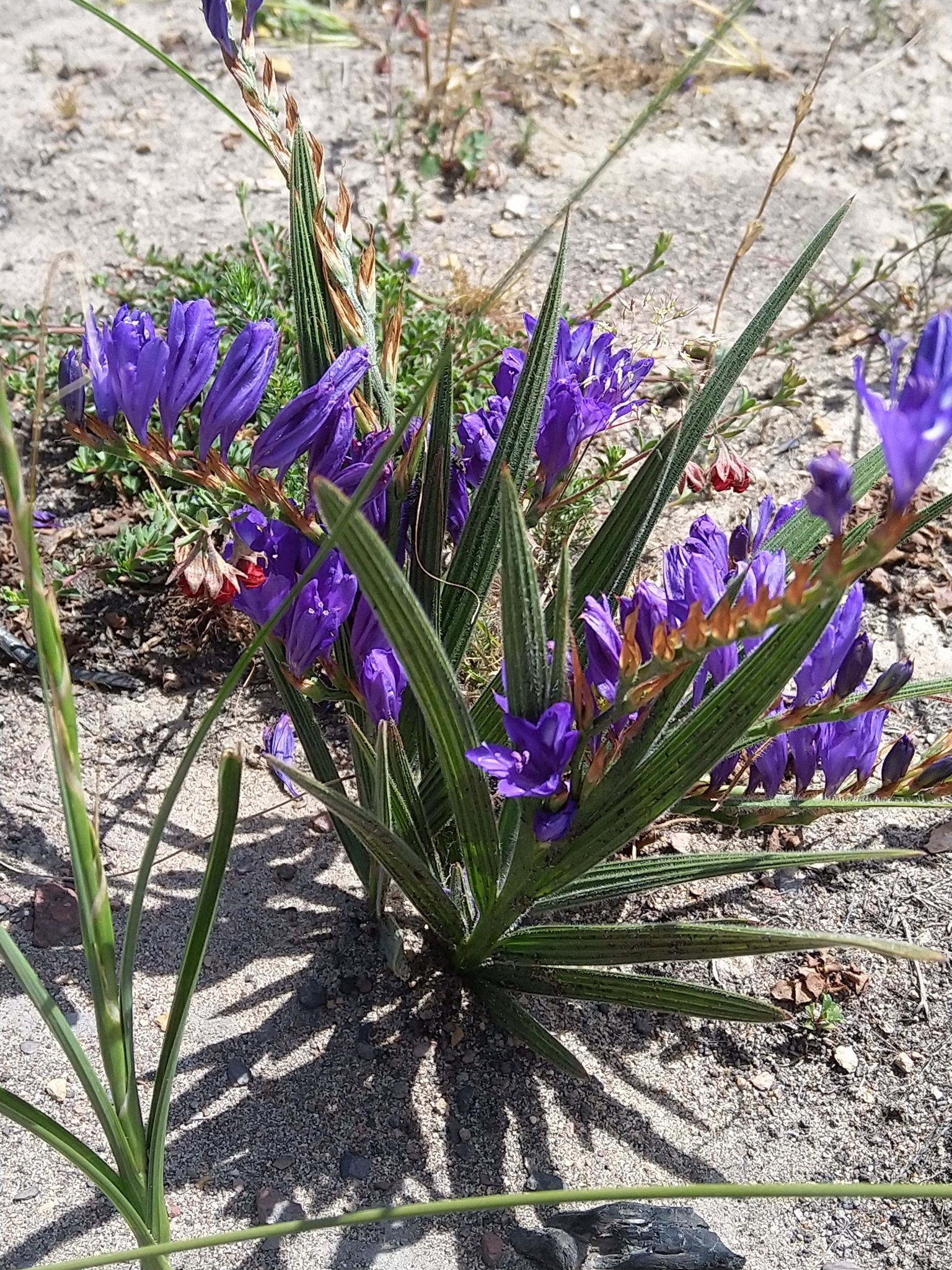
Babiana secunda

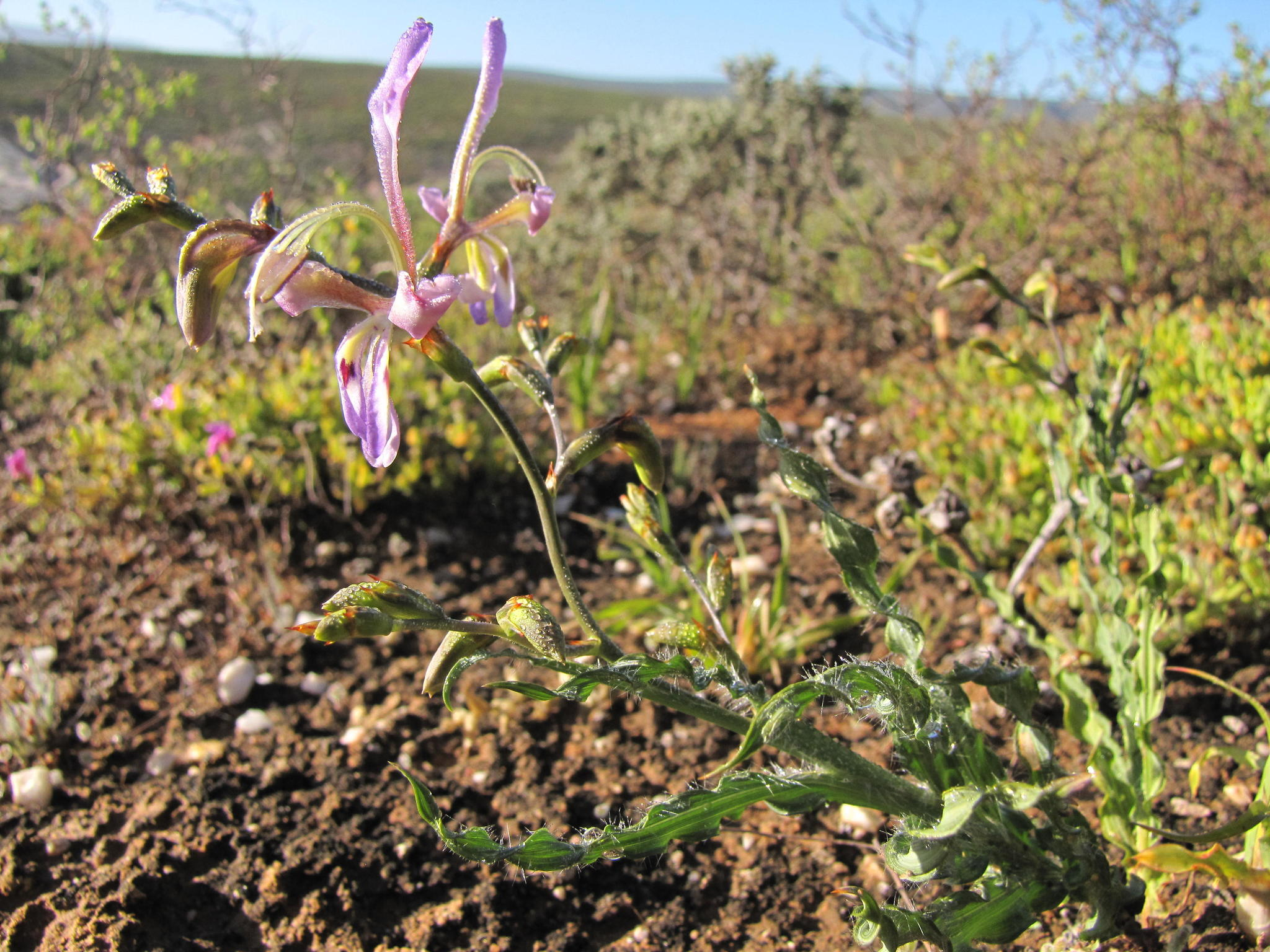
Babiana sinuata

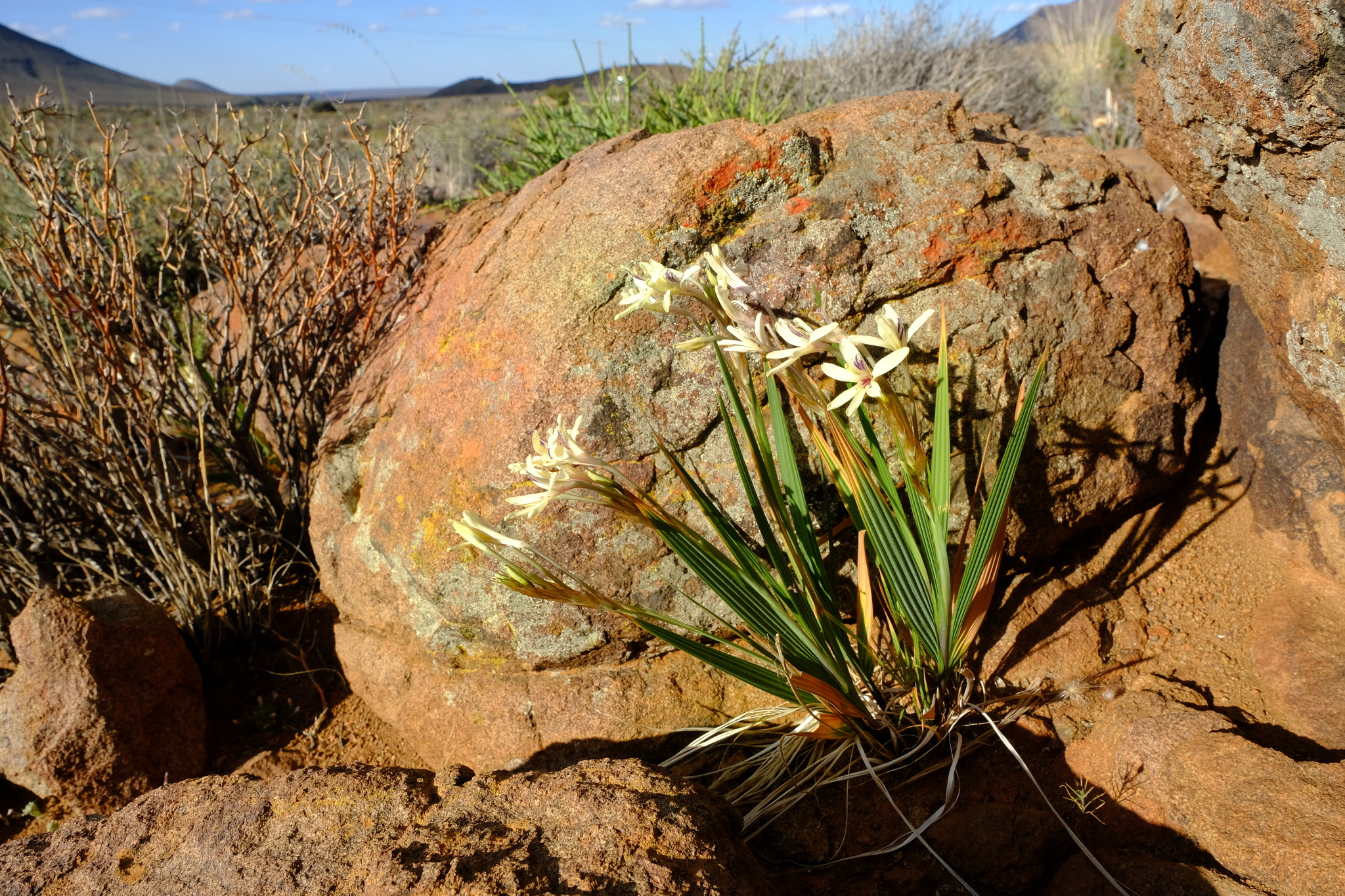
Babiana spathacea

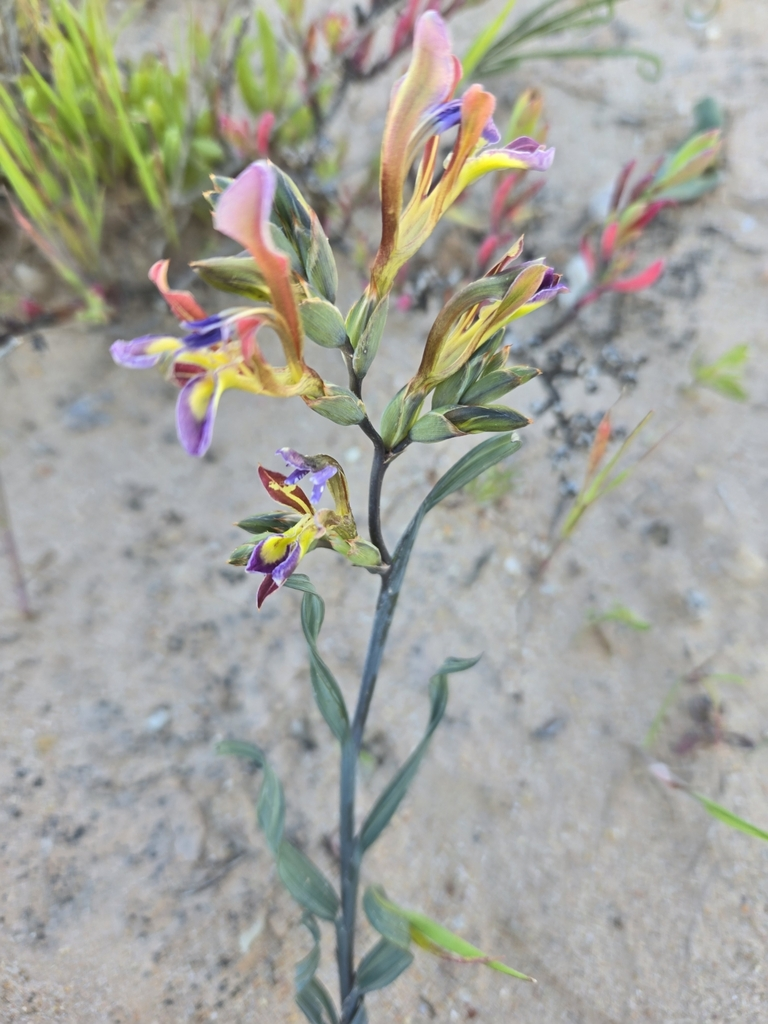
Babiana spiralis

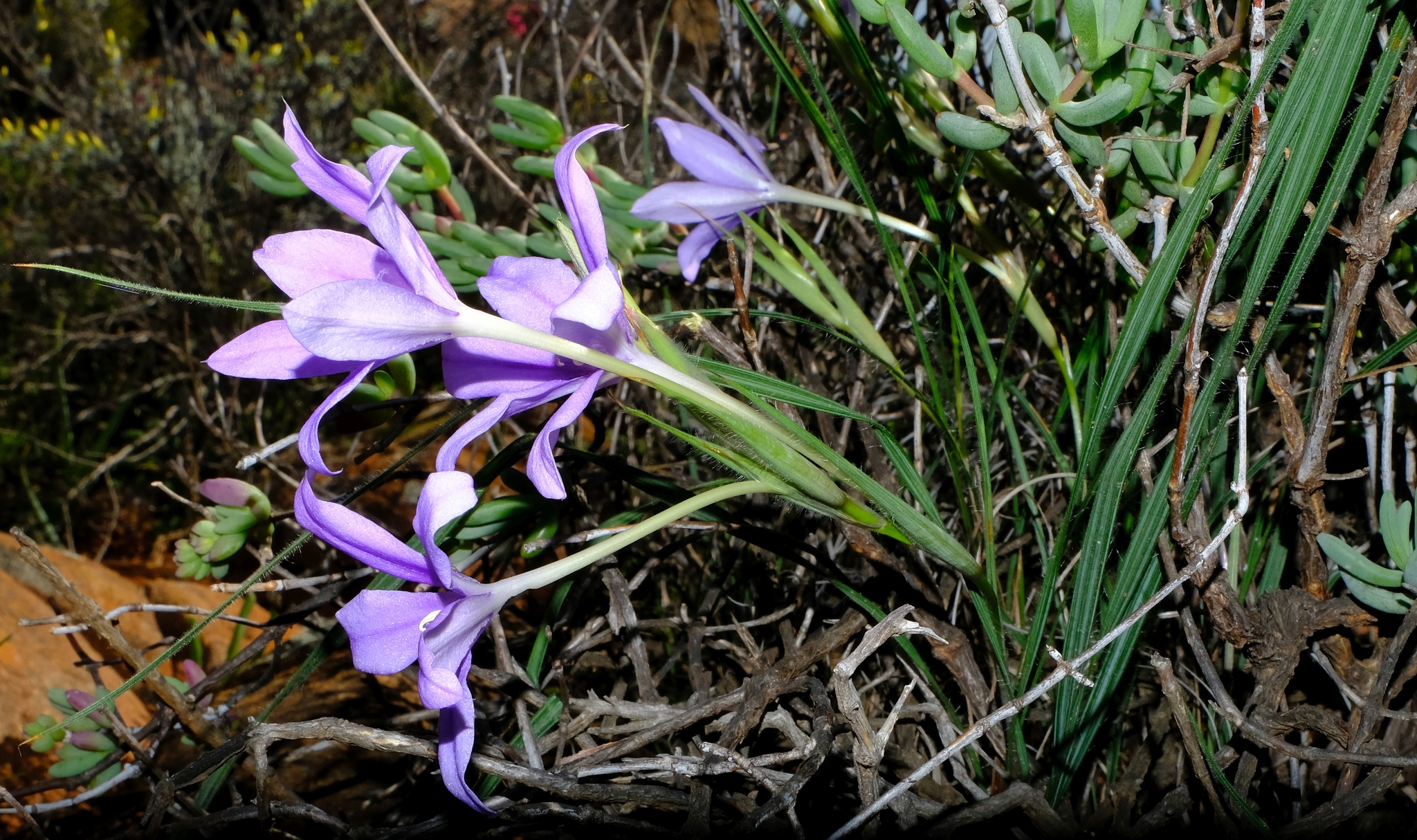
Babiana symmetrantha

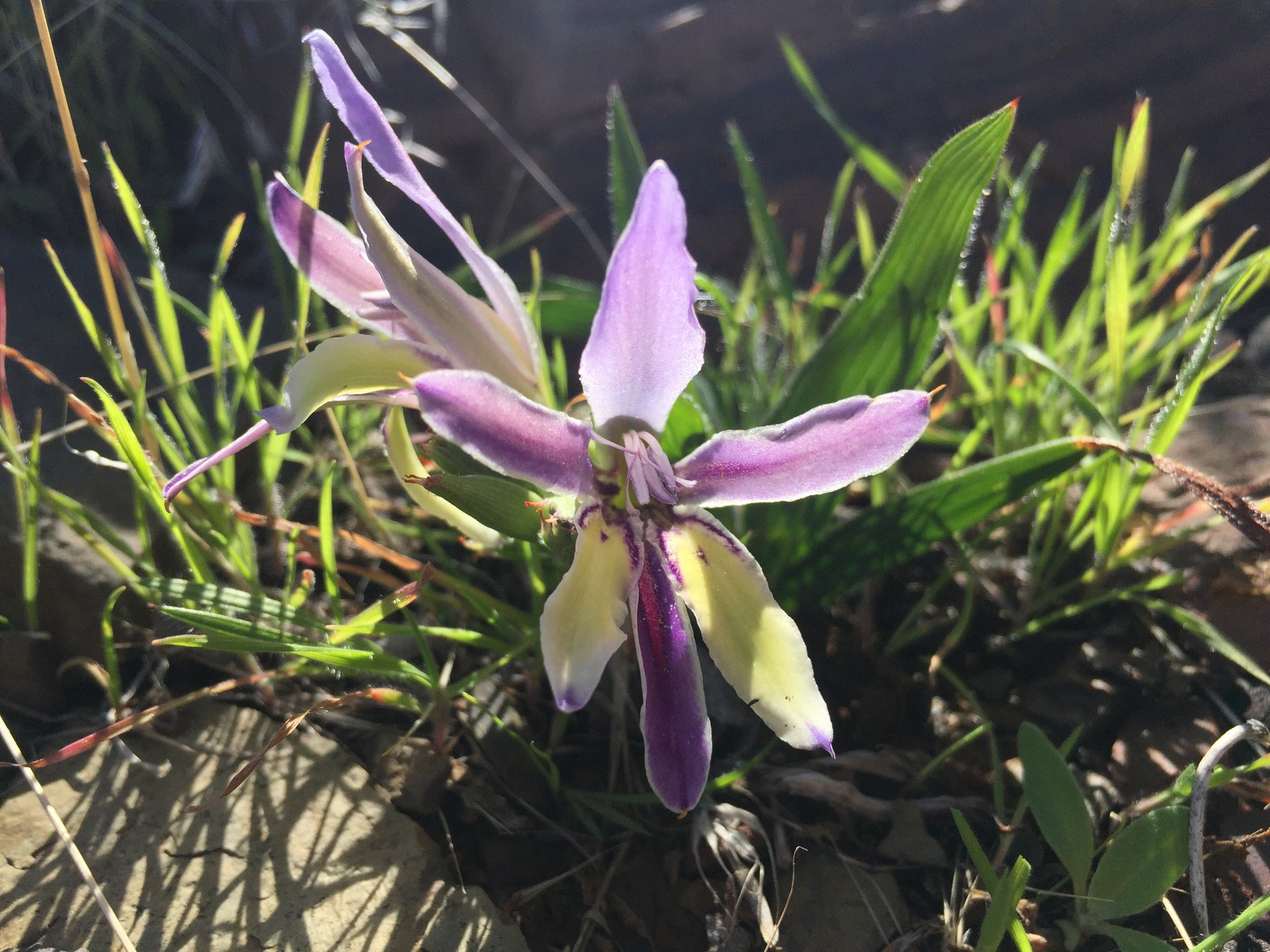
Babiana tanquana

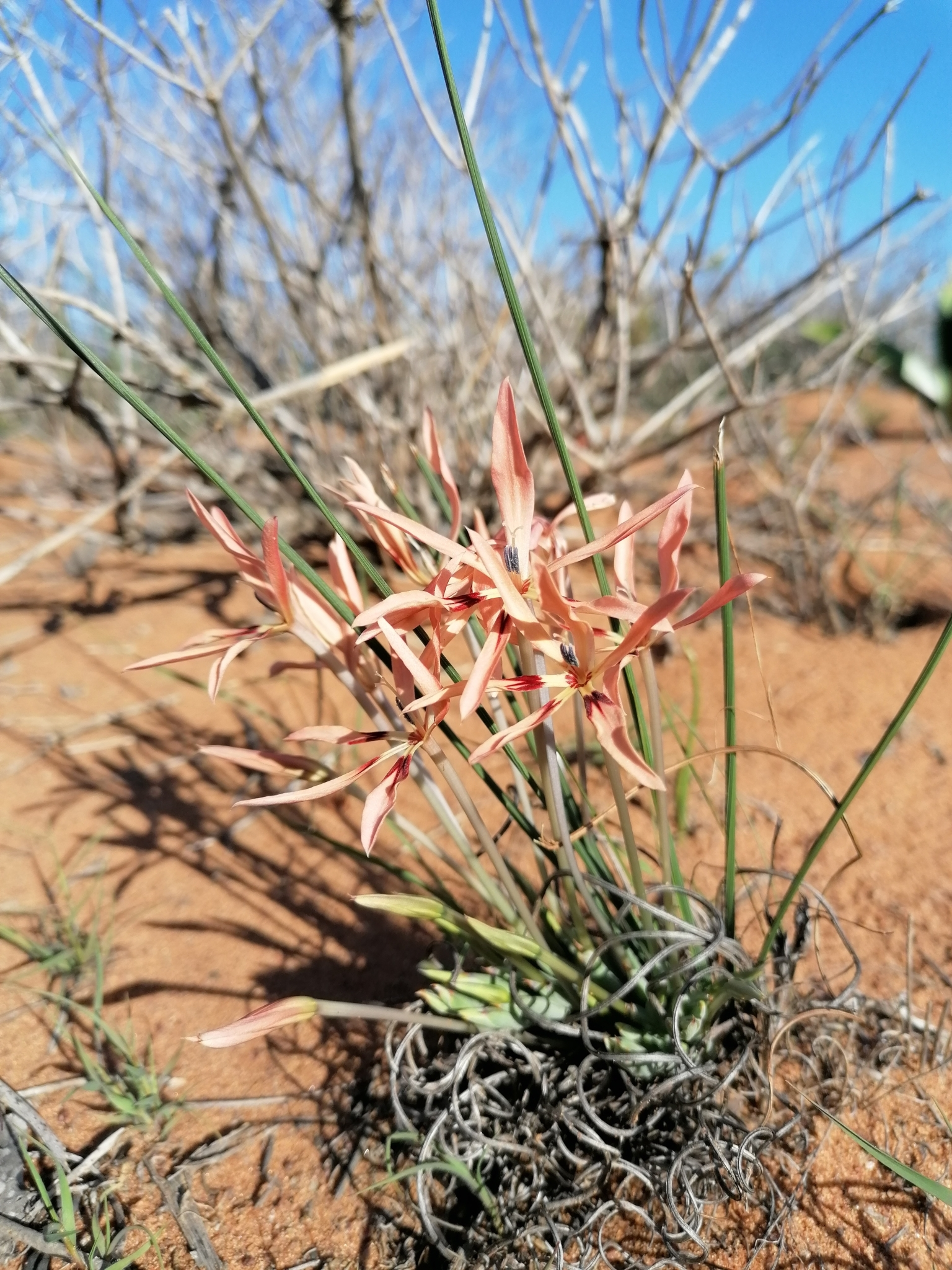
Babiana teretifolia

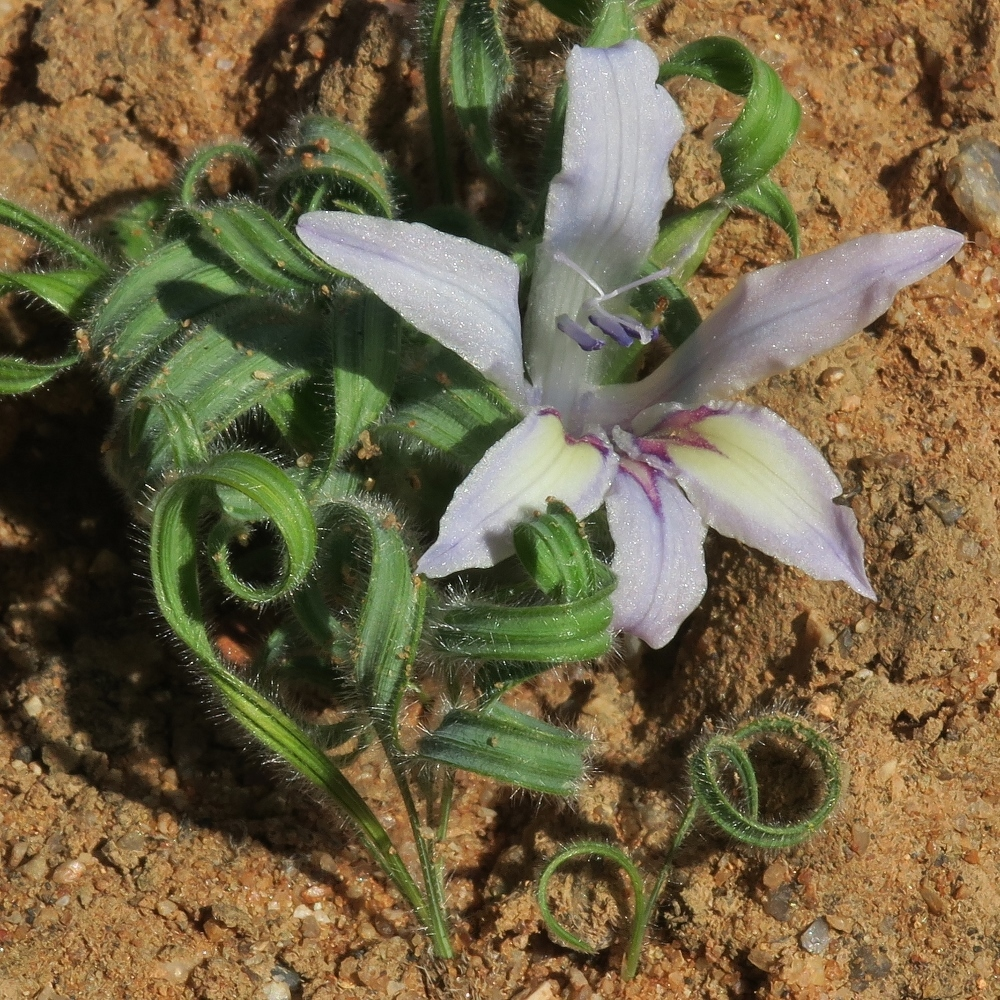
Babiana torta

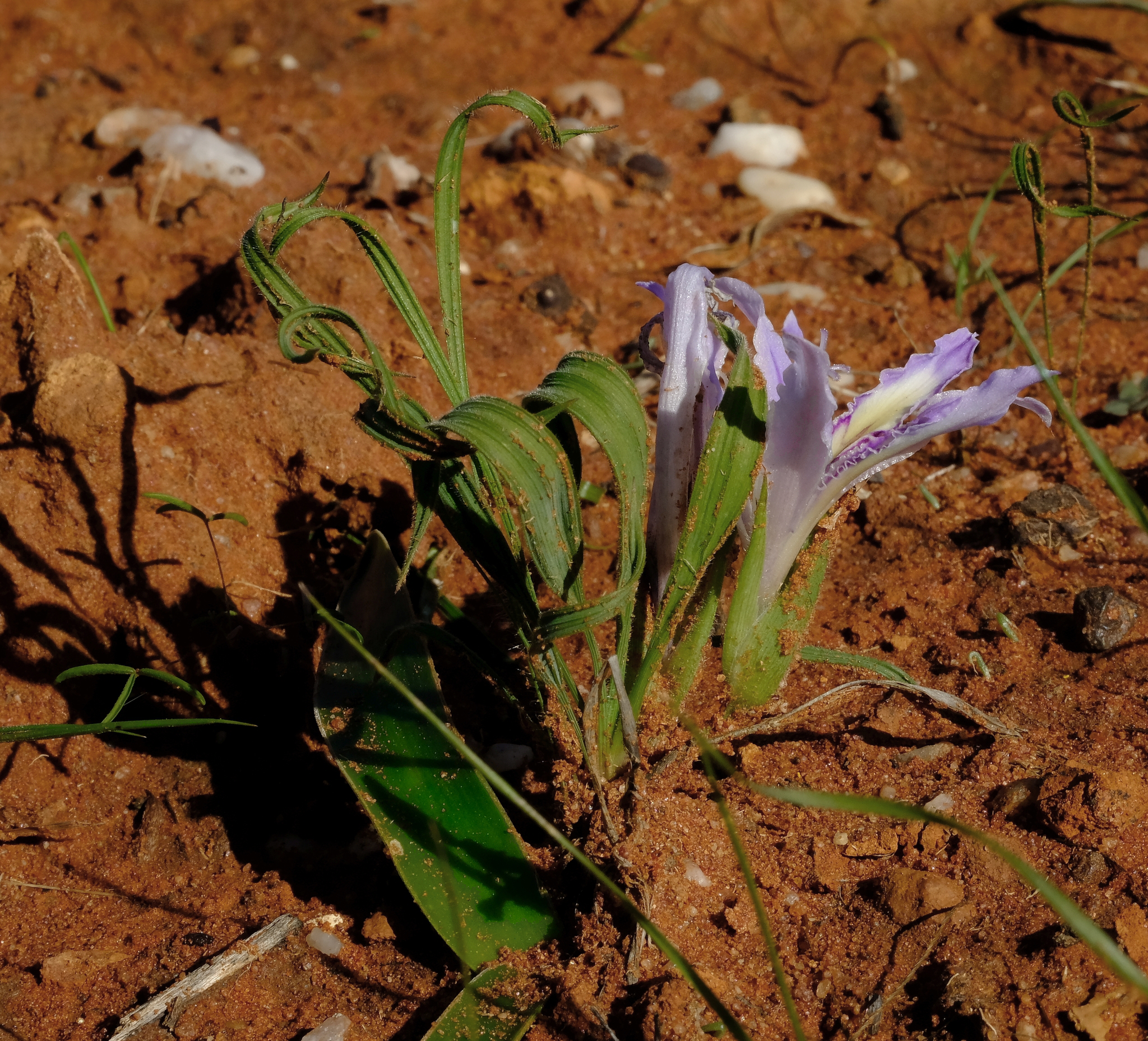
Babiana toximontana

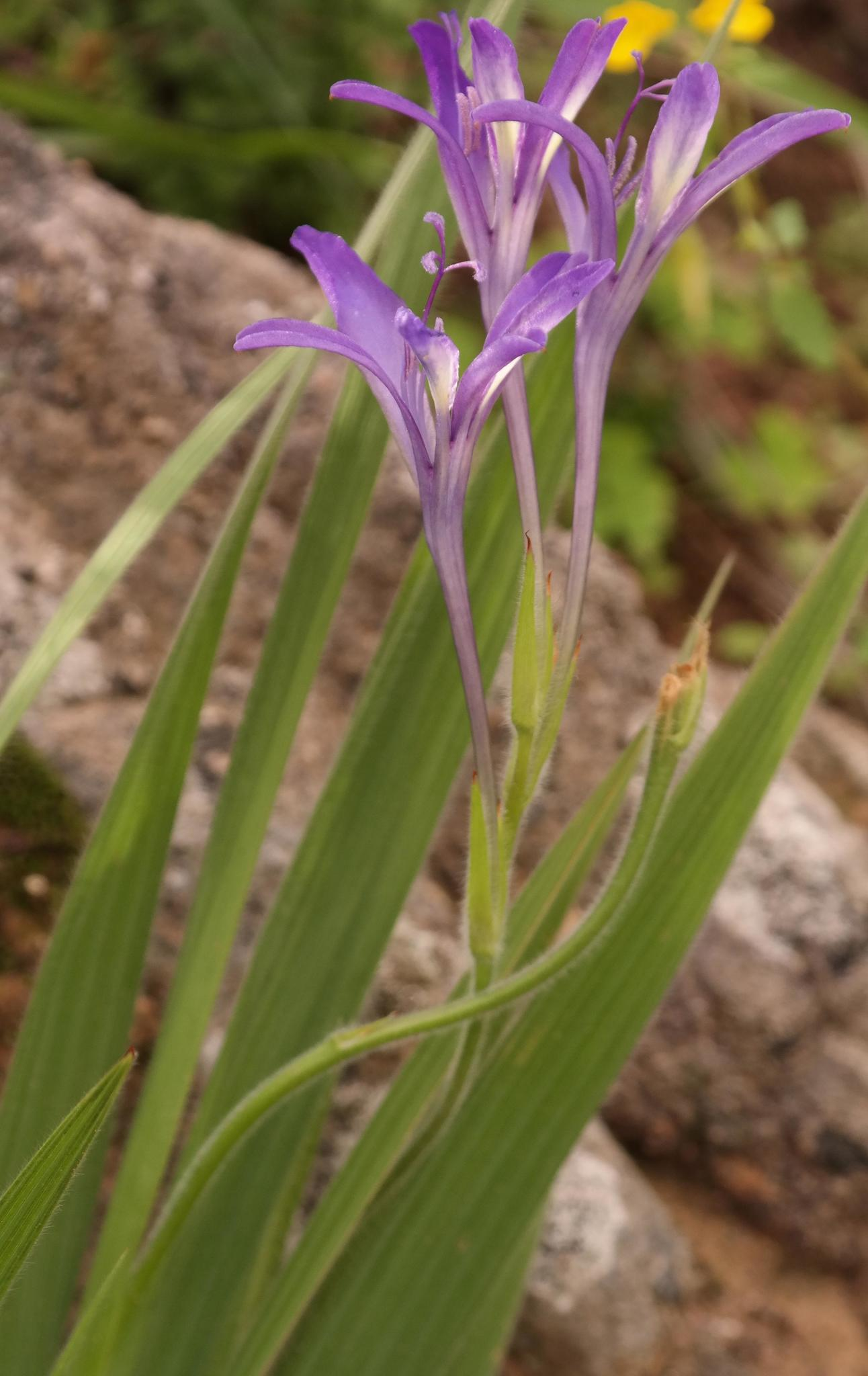
Babiana tubaeformis

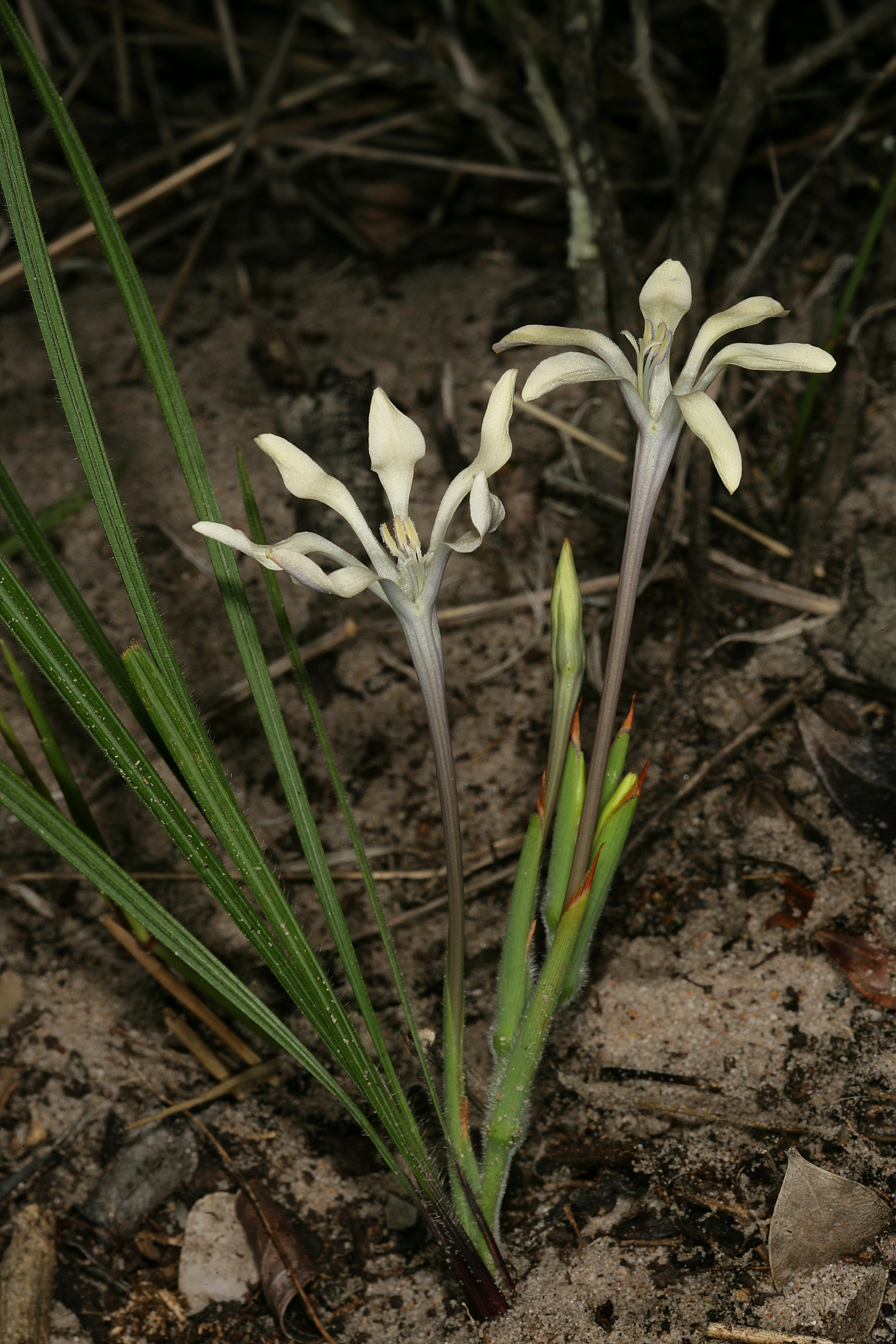
Babiana tubiflora

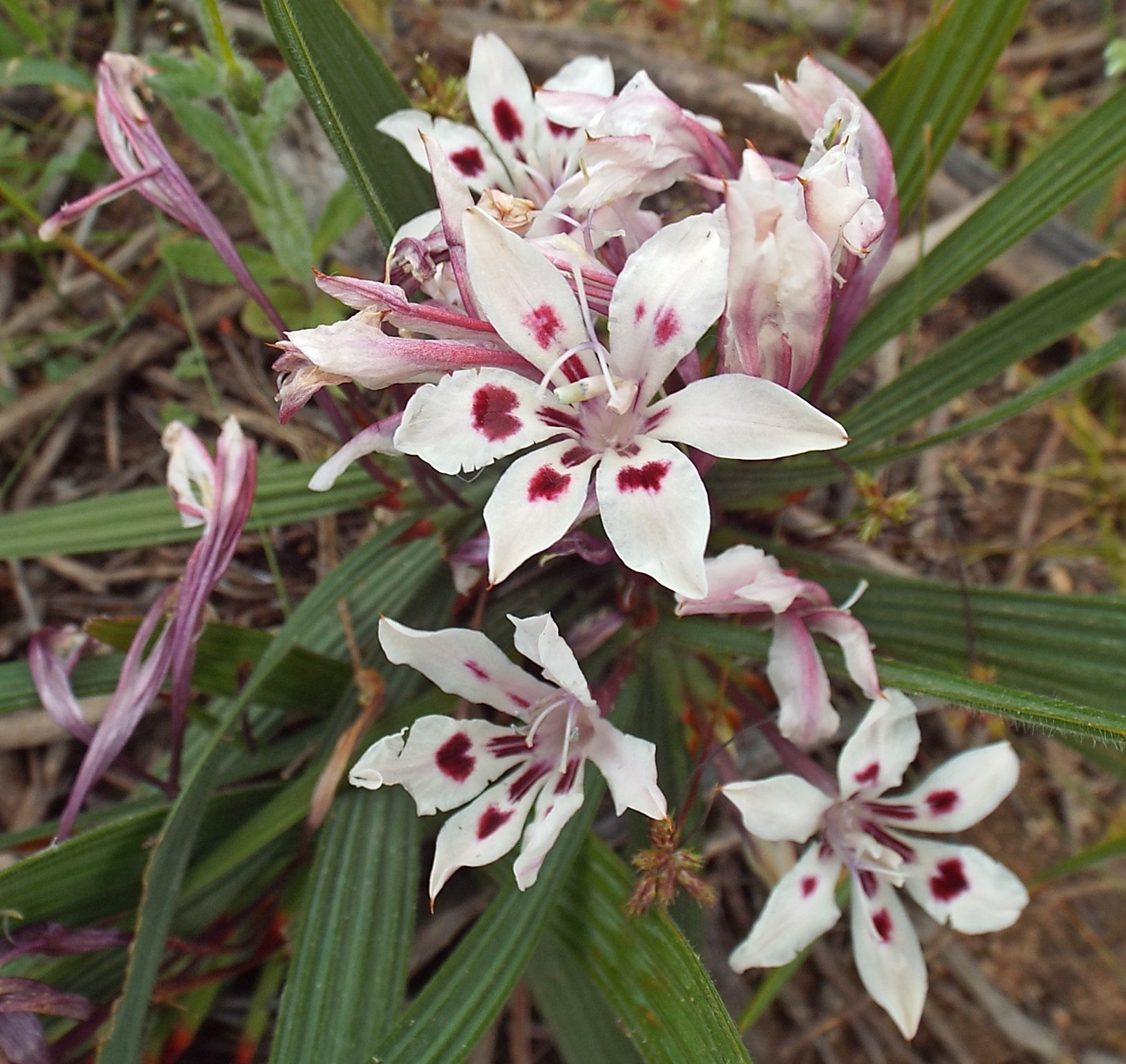
Babiana tubulosa

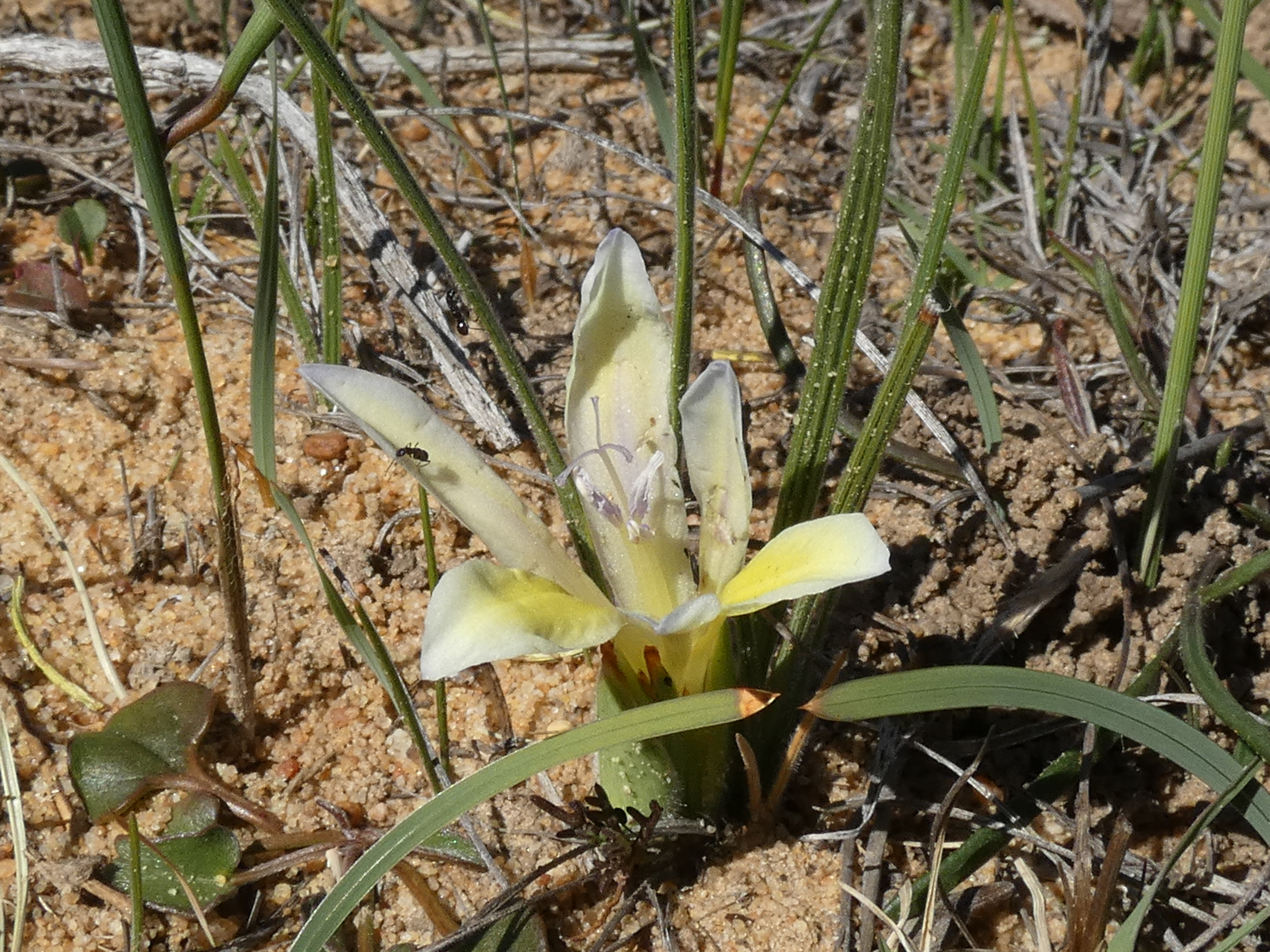
Babiana vanzijliae

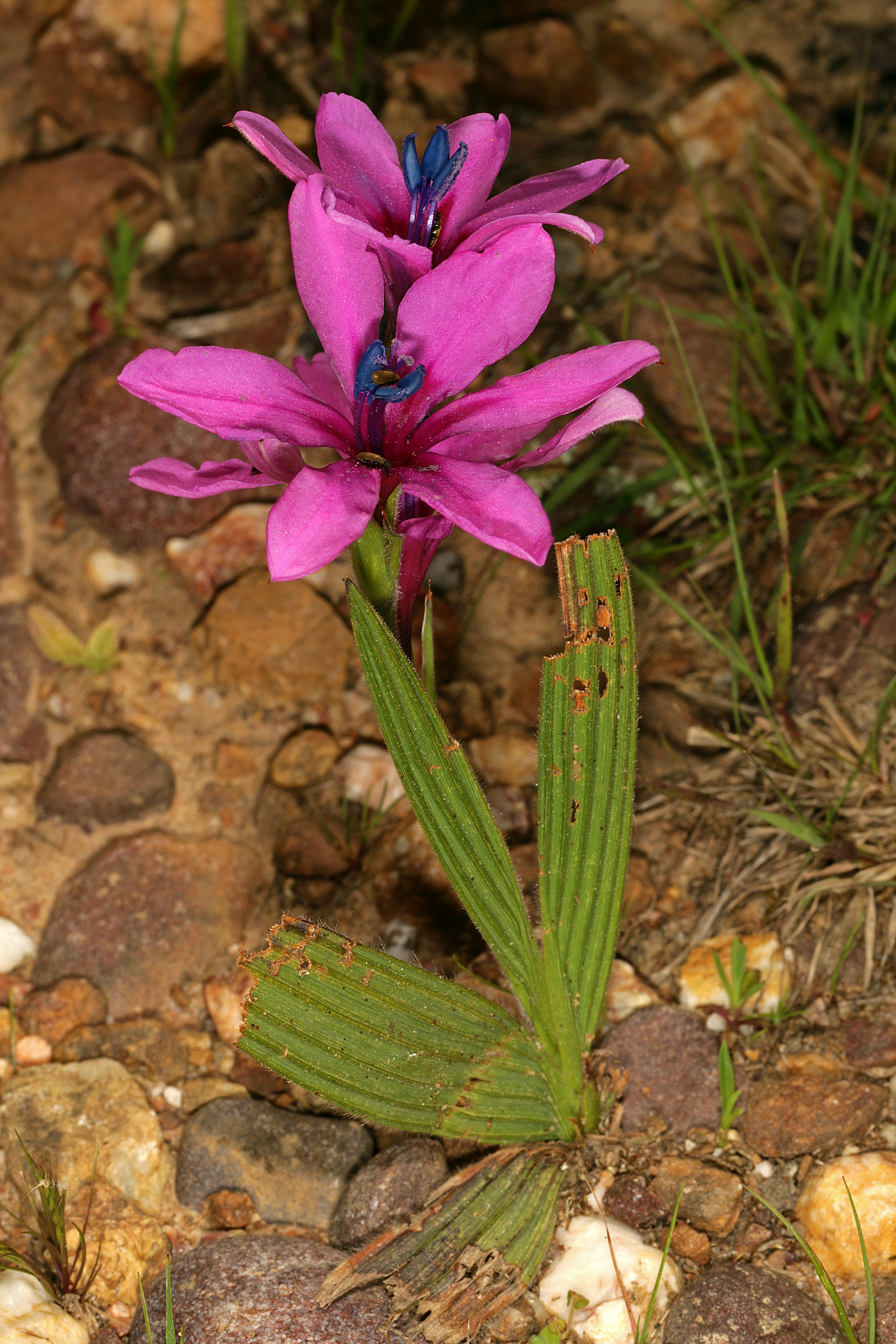
Babiana villosa

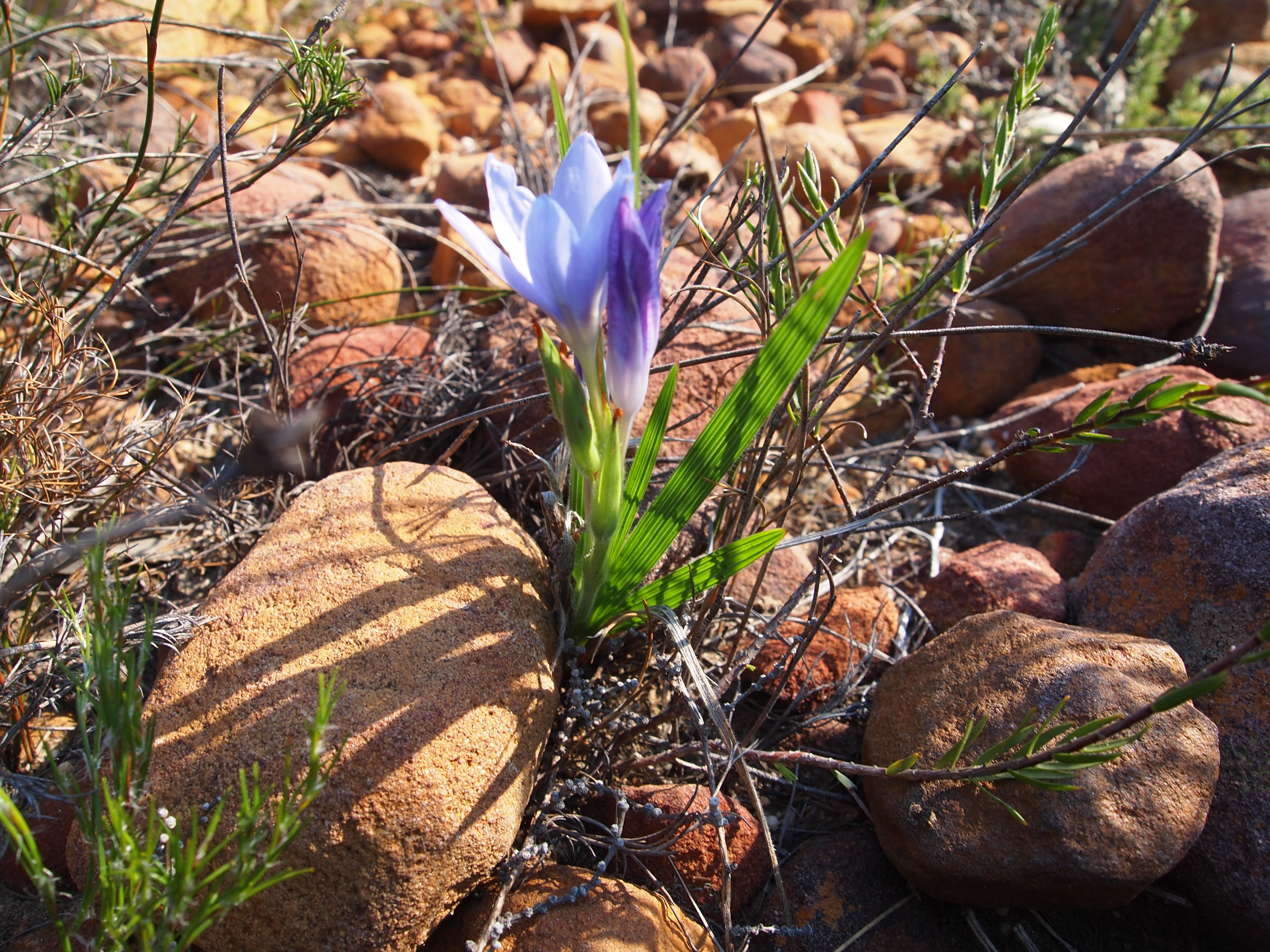
Babiana villosula

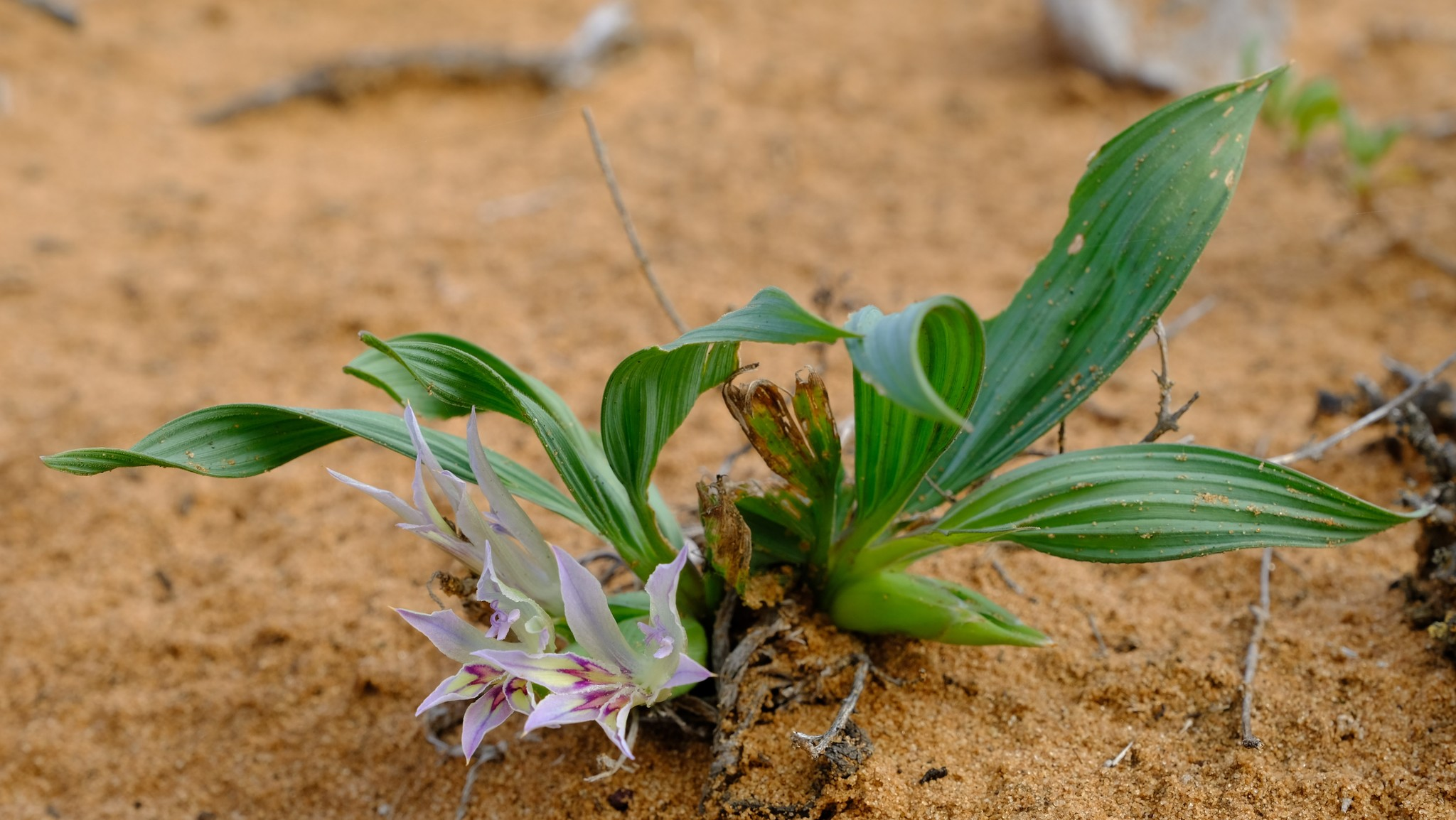
Babiana virescens

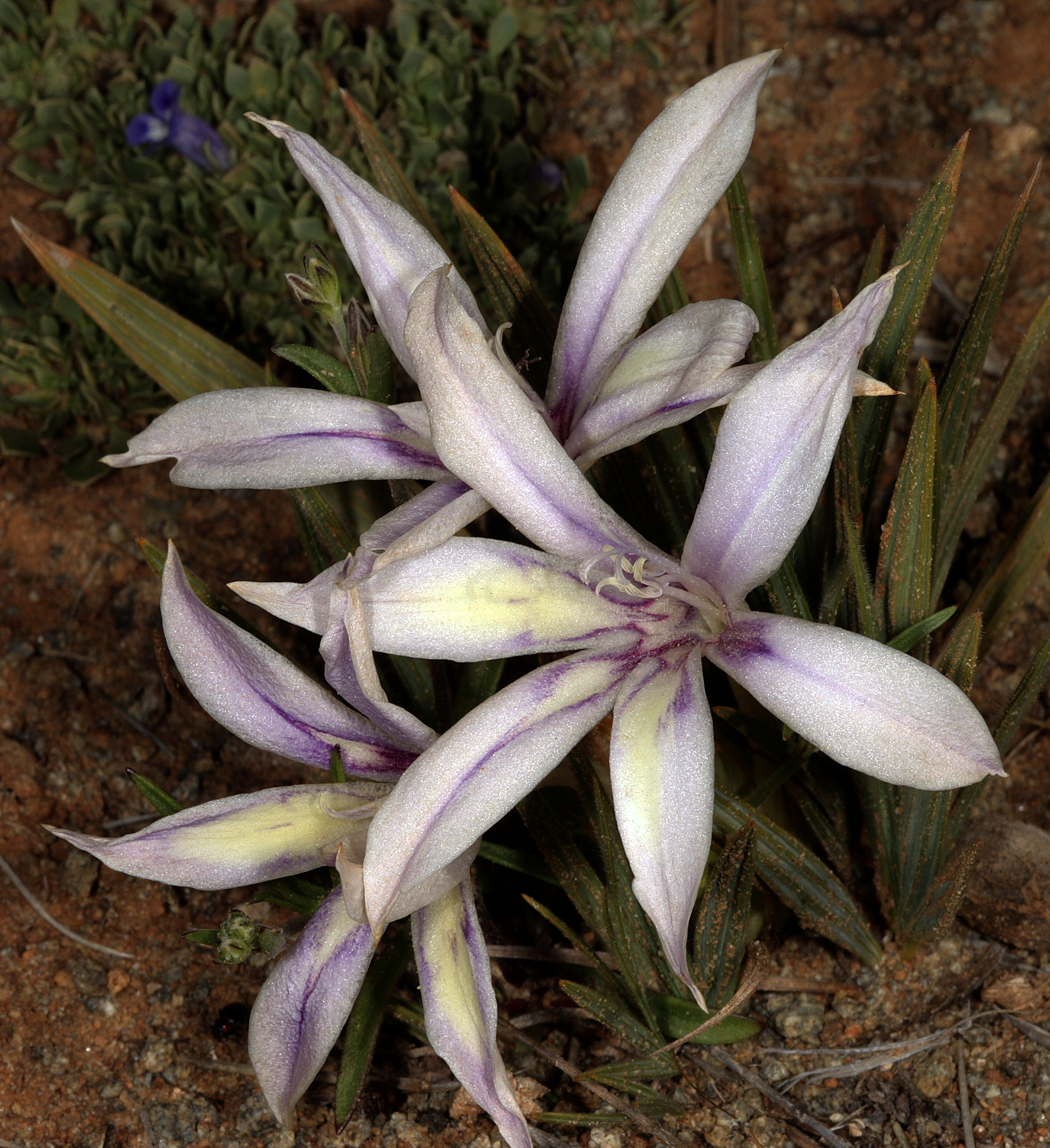
Babiana virginea

== Distribution ==
The vast majority of the 93 currently recognised species of bobbejaantjie occur in the west and southwest of the South African Cape provinces and in the southwest of Namibia, areas with predominant rainfall during the winter. Only two species occur in areas with predominantly summer rainfall. Babiana hypogaea can be found in southeastern Namibia, and in northwestern and central South Africa in particular Bushmanland and the Great Karoo. B. bainesii has a large distribution and can be found in Botswana, Namibia, central and eastern South Africa, Zimbabwe and southernmost Zambia.

== Ecology ==
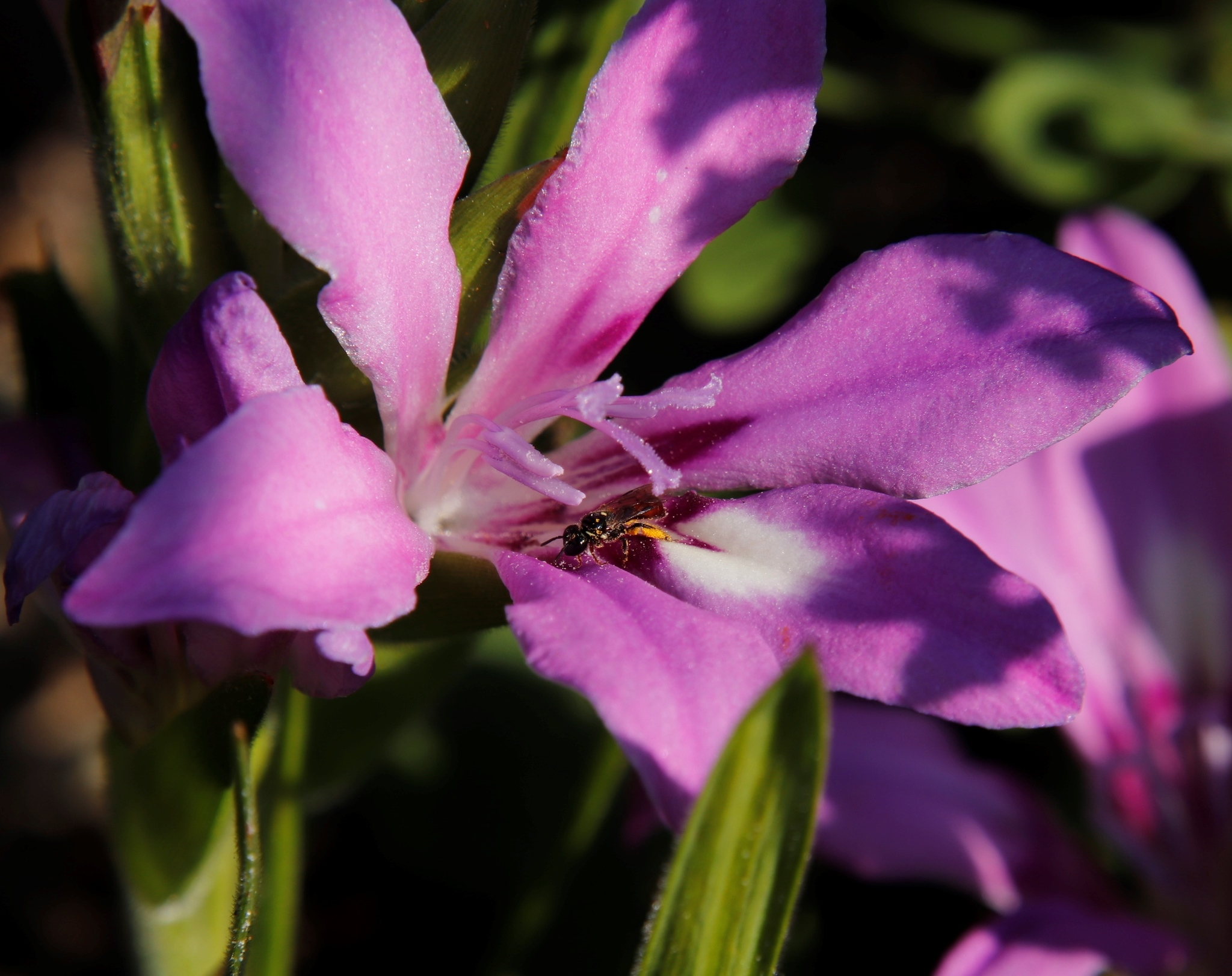
Babiana nana subsp. nana visited by a small solitary bee

The various species of bobbejaantjie have specialised flowers adapted to be pollinated by the Cape sugarbird and sunbirds, and by insects of four different orders, more in particular bees, tangle-veined flies, monkey beetles, and owlet moths. Pollination that occurs as a result of gathering nectar by native bees and honeybees is most common (shown in 18 species, likely in 35 more species). These species share mirror-symmetrical flowers with an upper and lower lip. This type of pollination appears to be the ancestral condition both in Babiana and many other Crocoidae genera. Pollination by female bees specifically foraging for pollen is shown in one species, but probably also occurs in four others that share prominent anthers and radially symmetric flowers. In 13 species pollination by long-tongued flies is established and probably occurs in five more. Proof of pollination by moths exists for one species but is expected in two others as well. Pollination exclusively by monkey beetles has been demonstrated in six species with radial symmetrical flowers. Two species that are pollinated by birds have scarlet flowers with a wide tube, and stiff stamens that extend far from the tube, and is inferred for one more. In three species pollination is accomplished by both bees and monkey beetles. It appears that shifts to other pollinators occur rather frequently both in Babiana and in other Crocoidae, and adaptations to accommodate the different pollinator groups have led to remarkably similar flowers in different genera in the Iridaceae family such as Lapeirousia, Hesperantha, Gladiolus and Babiana, as well as in Pelargonium and Orchidaceae that occur in the same area and habitat. Several more Babiana species have been described since this research was finalised.

== Conservation ==
There are currently 93 species of bobbejaantjie recognised, four of which each have two subspecies, totaling 97 taxa.

- The continued survival of 30 taxa is considered to be of least concern (B. ambigua, B. bainesii, B. brachystachys, B. crispa, B. cuneata, B. curviscapa, B. dregei, B. ecklonii, B. fimbriata, B. flabellifolia, B. fourcadei, B. gariepensis, B. grandiflora, B. hypogaea, B. minuta, B. mucronata subsp. mucronata, B. patersoniae, B. planifolia, B. pubescens, B. rigidifolia, B. ringens subspp. australis and ringens, B. sambucina subsp. sambucina, B. scabrifolia, B. scariosa, B. sinuata, B. spathacea, B. spiralis, B. torta and B. tubiflora).
- Twelve species are considered to be rare (B. auriculata, B. cederbergensis, B. cinnamomea, B. framesii, B. geniculata, B. lapeirousioides, B. pilosa, B. praemorsa, B. rivulicola, B. stenomera, B. tanquana and B. virginea).
- Twelve are thought to be near-threatened (B. angustifolia, B. confusa, B. fragans, B. hirsuta, B. horizontalis, B. lineolata, B. nana subsp. maculata, B. nervosa, B. tubulosa, B. vanzijliae, B. villosa and B. virescens).
- Eleven species are vulnerable (B. karooica, B. lanata, B. lewisiana, B. melanops, B. namaquensis, B. papyracea, B. pauciflora, B. rubella, B. salteri, B. tritonioides and B. unguiculata).
- Eighteen taxa are treated as endangered (B. arenicola, B. avicularis, B. carminea, B. engysiphon, B. inclinata, B. leipoldtii, B. lobata, B. montana, B. mucronata subsp. minor, B. nana subsp. nana, B. noctiflora, B. odorata, B. petiolata, B. purpurea, B. rubrocyanea, B. sambucina subsp. longibracteata, B. toximontana and B. villosula).
- Nine species are regarded as being critically endangered (B. blanda, B. latifolia, B. pygmaea, B. radiata, B. regia, B. secunda, B. symmetriantha, B. teretifolia and B. tubaeformis).
- One species (B. foliosa) is possibly extinct.

== Cultivation ==
Babiana nervosa (under its synonym B. stricta) is sometimes cultivated in gardens and grows best in more or less Mediterranean climates and well-draining soils. Corms of this species are available from commercial growers.
