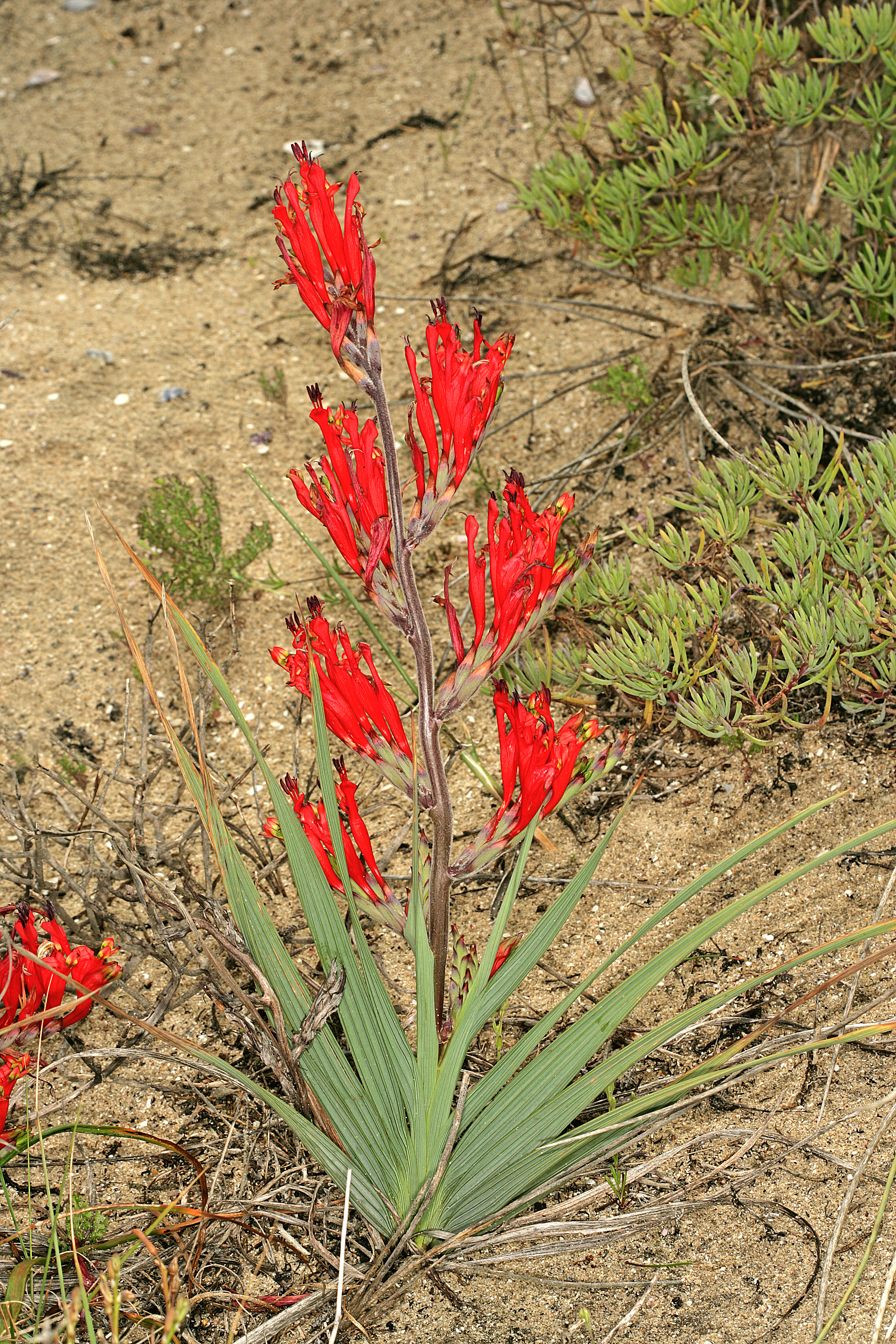

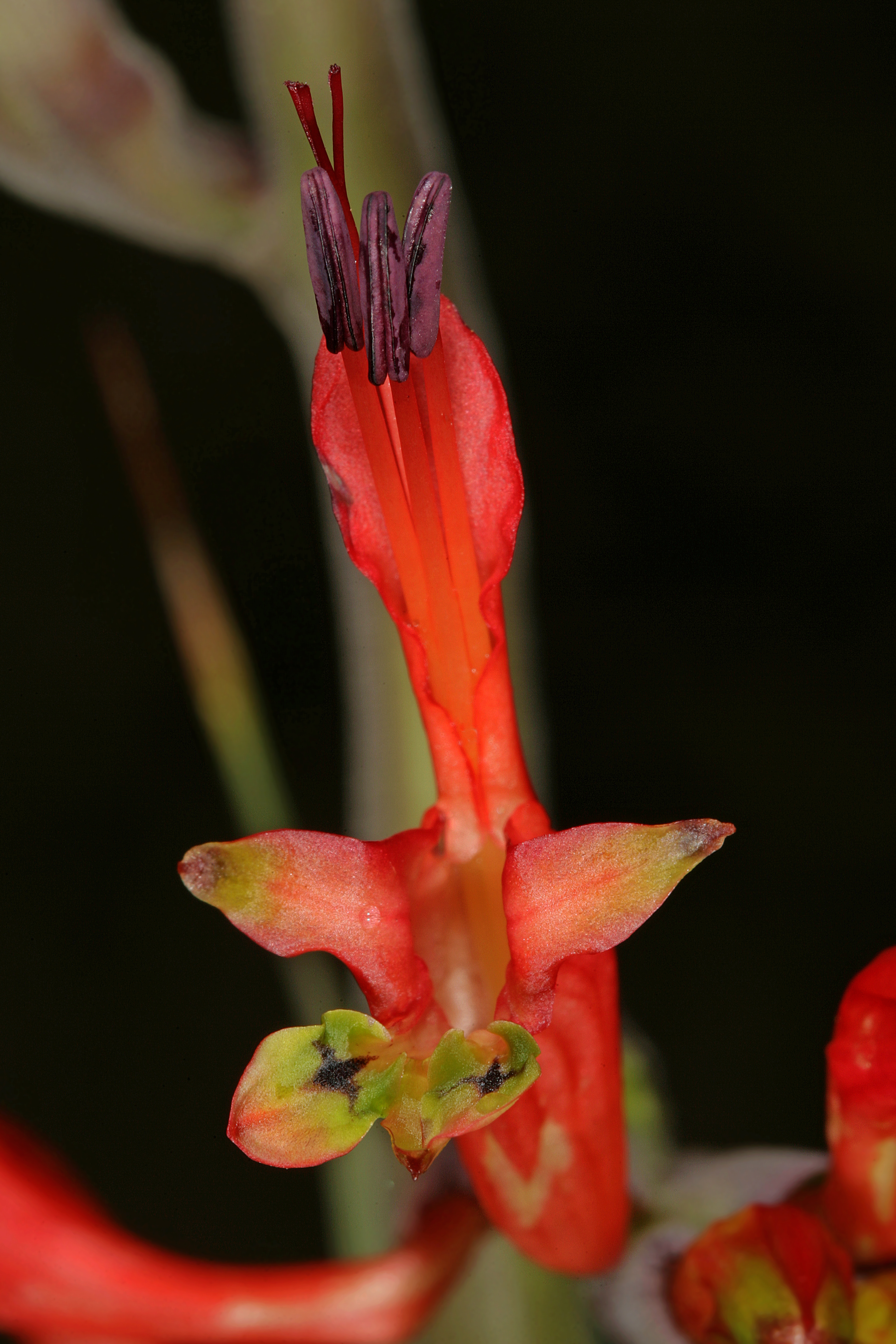

Scientific classification
- Kingdom: Plantae
- Clade: Tracheophytes
- Clade: Angiosperms
- Clade: Monocots
- Order: Asparagales
- Family: Iridaceae
- Genus: Babiana
- Species: B. hirsuta

Binomial name
- Babiana hirsuta (Lam.) Goldblatt & J.C.Manning

Synonyms
- Synonymy: Anaclanthe namaquensis N.E.Br.; Anaclanthe plicata (L.f.) N.E.Br.; Antholyza hirsuta Lam.; Antholyza hirta Pers.; Antholyza namaquensis (N.E.Br.) Goldblatt; Antholyza plicata L.f.; Babiana thunbergii Ker Gawl.; Gladiolus mollis Vahl; Gladiolus sulcatus Lam.

= Babiana hirsuta =

Species of flowering plant

Babiana hirsuta is a species of geophyte of 40–70 cm (16–28 in) high that is assigned to the family Iridaceae. It has many scarlet mirror-symmetrical flowers in a branched inflorescence with several short ascending branches. The flower has a narrow tube, and three large, blackish or dark purple anthers that extend beyond the dorsal tepal. The leaves are velvety hairy, lance-shaped, laterally compressed and set in a fan. It is an endemic species of South Africa that can be found along the west coast of the Northern and Western Cape provinces as far south as Saldanha. It is called red babiana in English, but that name is also applied to Babiana villosa, and strandlelie, sandlelie and rooihanekam in Afrikaans. Until 2008, the strandlelie was known as Babiana thunbergii.

== Description ==
Babiana hirsuta is a perennial plant of 40–70 cm (16–28 in) high that emerges from an underground globular corm at the start of its growing season. It has an upright, densely hairy flowering stem with short, horizontal branches. Its leaves each consist of a sheath and a blade, which are at an angle with each other. The sheath closely envelops the sheaths of leaves higher on the shoot, and the blade is lance-shaped, stiff, shortly or bristly hairy and laterally compressed, resulting in a left and right surface, rather than an upper and lower surface, pleated, meaning that the surfaces of the leaf abruptly and repetitively change angle at the location of one of the veins, and set in a fan. Each individual flower is subtended by two bracts, the outer bract 18–30 mm (0.71–1.18 in) long, larger than and clasping the inner bract. Both bracts are hairless or shortly hairy, green with dry brown tips. The inner bract has two prominent veins, is transparent along the middle and is forked to about midlength.

The many mirror-symmetrical flowers have no smell, are upright, facing outwards and crowded on several ascending branches, and consist of a merged, narrowly funnel-shaped perianth tube at the base of 30–40 mm (1.2–1.6 in) long and six separate tepal lobes, grouped in an upper (consisting of the three dorsal tepals) and lower lip (comprising the remaining three lower tepals). Most of the flower is bright scarlet in colour, but the lower tepals have a yellow blotch, marked with dark green near its base. The dorsal tepal is 16–20 mm (0.63–0.79 in) long, upright, with the edges curled inwards, enclosing parts of the filaments of the three stamens and merged with the lateral dorsal tepals about 6 mm (0.24 in) higher than the higher lateral tepals with the lower lateral tepals. The upper and lower tepals are about 8 mm (0.31 in) long. The stamens have straight filaments of 37–40 mm (1.5–1.6 in) long and reach beyond the tip of the dorsal tepal. The inferior ovary is hairless and carries a style that splits into three branches opposite the lower half of the anthers; the branches are about 4 mm (0.16 in) long. Flowering occurs between July and October.

=== Differences with similar species ===
Babiana avicularis and B. ringens also have upright mirror-symmetrical scarlet flowers, but in both the flowering stem is sterile, providing a vertical perch for pollination birds, and only one or two horizontal side branches, close to the soil carry flowers, while in B. hirsuta the top of the main stem and several ascending side branches carry flowers. The flowers of B. avicularis are much smaller than those of B. hirsuta. In B. ringens the dorsal tepal is 25–50 mm (0.98–1.97 in) long and the leaves are hairless but in B. hirsuta, the dorsal tepal is 15–25 mm (0.59–0.98 in) long and the leaves are velvety. The flowers of B. carminea are star-symmetrical and carmine red, B. hirsuta has mirror-symmetrical flowers that are scarlet with yellow blotches. B. villosa can have red, star-symmetrical flowers (but also has populations with magenta coloured flowers).

== Taxonomy ==
Strandlelie was first described by Carl Linnaeus the Younger as Antholyza plicata in 1781, based on specimens collected by Carl Thunberg in 1774 near Verlorenvlei. In 1783, Jean-Baptiste Lamarck described it again and provided the name Antholyza hirsuta. John Bellenden Ker Gawler in 1802 created the new genus name Babiana to accommodate the species of bobbejaantjie. He created the name Babiana plicata in 1803, as new combination to replace Gladiolus fragans, now Babiana fragans. When Ker Gawler decided Antholyza plicata also needed to be reassigned in 1804, he thought that Babiana plicata was unavailable, so he came up with a new name for strandlelie, Babiana thunbergii. Martin Vahl posthumously published the name Gladiolus mollis in 1805. In 1932, Nicholas Edward Brown moved Linnaeus' species to his newly distinguished genus, calling it Anaclanthe plicata, and he also named Anaclanthe namaquensis. The latter was reassigned by Peter Goldblatt in 1971, who called it Antholyza namaquensis. In 2008, Goldblatt and John Charles Manning clarified that Antholyza plicata L.f., Antholyza hirsuta Lam. and Anaclanthe namaquensis N.E.Br. were in fact synonyms, that A. plicata was an unavailable name and the species needed to be included in Babiana, resulting in the new combination Babiana hirsuta.

== Distribution, ecology and conservation ==
Strandlelie can be found along the coast of Namaqualand between the mouth of the Orange River in the north and Saldanha Bay in the south. It is likely this species also grows in part of the Sperrgebiet in southwestern Namibia, but this area is closed for plant exploration to avoid illegal diamond mining. The wide perianth of the flower contains much nectar, up to 30 μl, and is pollinated by both dusky and malachite sunbirds. This species grows in the desert and Succulent Karoo on sandy flats and dunes. Here, it has a distribution area of 21,000 km^{2} (8,100 mi^{2}) and is known from seventeen locations. The species is threatened by diamond mining in the north of its range, while in the south the populations are under pressure due to overgrazing and coastal development. In addition, there are plans to mine heavy minerals near the Groenrivier. Therefore Babiana hirsuta is regarded a near-threatened species.
