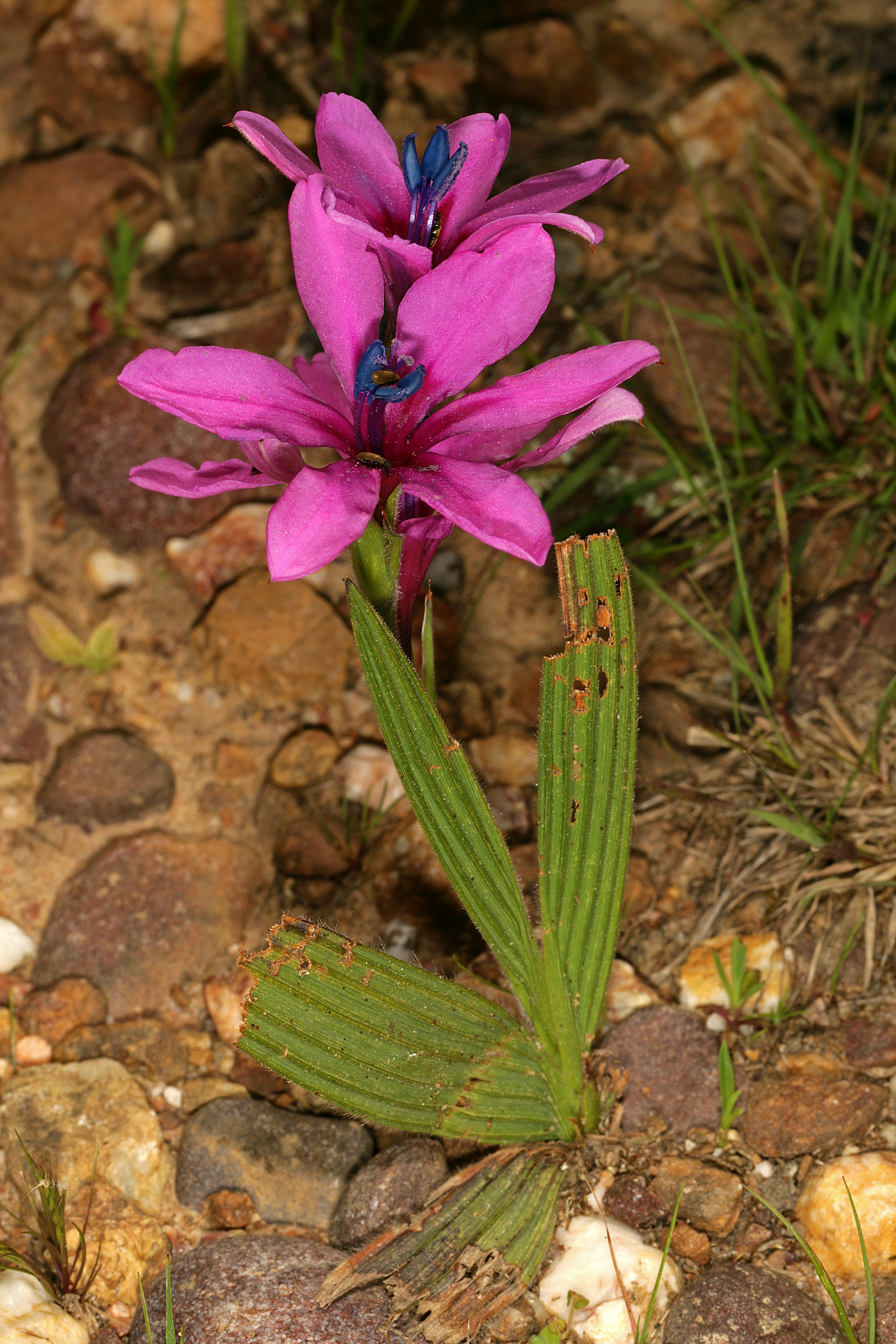

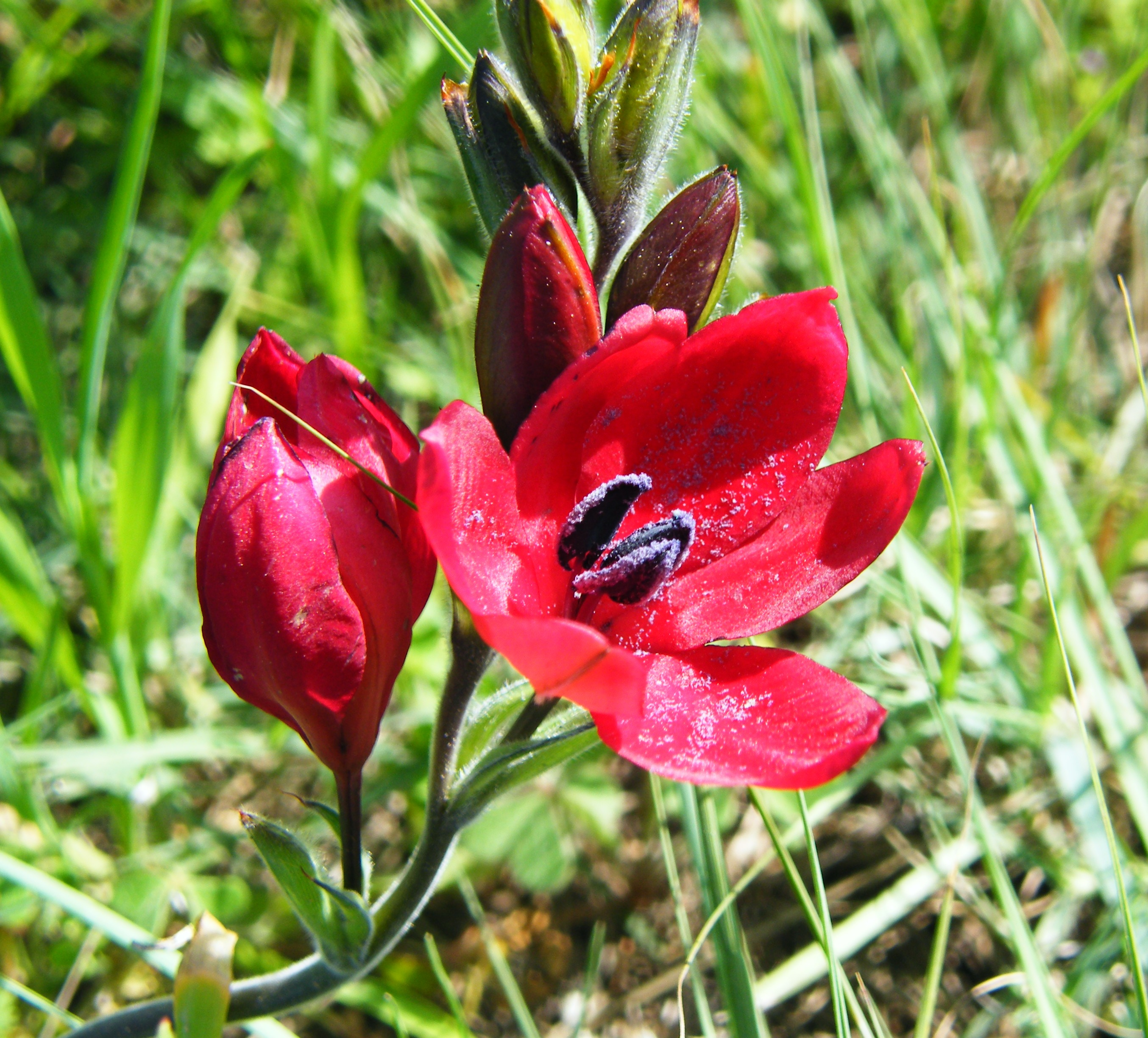

Scientific classification
- Kingdom: Plantae
- Clade: Tracheophytes
- Clade: Angiosperms
- Clade: Monocots
- Order: Asparagales
- Family: Iridaceae
- Genus: Babiana
- Species: B. villosa

Binomial name
- Babiana villosa (Aiton) Ker Gawl.

Synonyms
- Ixia villosa Sol.; Gladiolus latifolius Lam.; Ixia punicea Jacq.; Gladiolus mucronatus DC.

= Babiana villosa =

Red babiania

Species of flowering plant

Babiana villosa is a species of geophyte of 10–20 cm (3.9–7.9 in) high that is assigned to the family Iridaceae. It has mauve-pink, purple or scarlet star-symmetrical wide chalice-shaped flowers with narrow tube, large, blackish or dark purple anthers, and velvety hairy, lance-shaped, laterally compressed leaves, set in a fan. Flowers occur during August and September. It grows between Malmesbury and Wellington in the Western Cape province of South Africa. It is commonly called red babiana in English and rooibobbejaantjie in Afrikaans.

== Description ==
Babiana villosa is a perennial plant of 10–20 cm (3.9–7.9 in) high that emerges from an underground globular corm at the start of its growing season. Its stem is velvety hairy and mostly strongly deflexed. The leaf blades are hairy, lance-shaped, laterally compressed resulting in a right and left surface, rather than an upper and lower surface, and pleated, meaning that the surfaces of the leaf abruptly and repetitively change angle at the location of one of the veins. Each individual flower is subtended by two green bracts with brown dry tips, that are 13–24 mm (0.51–0.94 in), exceptionally up to 28 mm (1.1 in) long. The inner bract is only half to two thirds as long as the outer and is split over its length in two halves.

The inflorescence consists of three to eight unscented flowers in an ascending spike. The mauve-pink, purple or scarlet star-symmetrical perianth consists of a slender tube of 16–28 mm (0.63–1.10 in), rarely up to 36 mm (1.4 in) long, that suddenly splits in to six almost identical spoon-shaped, oval tepals of 28–33 mm (1.1–1.3 in) long and 12–15 mm (0.47–0.59 in) wide, that even when fully open always remain partly cupped. The stamens are regularly distributed around the style, which deviates from the arrangement in almost all other Babiana species. The stamens consist of upright filaments of 8–15 mm (0.31–0.59 in) long topped by arrow-shaped, blackish to dark purple anthers of 7–9 mm (0.28–0.35 in) long and 3 mm (0.12 in) at its widest point, with the split through which the pollen is released sideways (or latrorse). The ovary is hairless and carries a style that divides just below or at the level of the bottom of the anthers in three branches of 2–3 mm (0.079–0.118 in) long. The ovary develops into a dry capsule that splits longitudinally, to release many irregularly angled, dark brown seeds. Rooibobbejaantjie flowers during August and September.

=== Differences with similar species ===
B. nervosa has bristly hairy, tightly pleated, narrow leaves. B. melanops has a more upright stem, tepals that are narrowing at their base and so create a space between them and the tepals are flat like a dinner plate when the flower is fully open. B. villosa is softly hairy, the tepals are not narrower near the base, and form a shallow cup even when fully open.

== Taxonomy ==
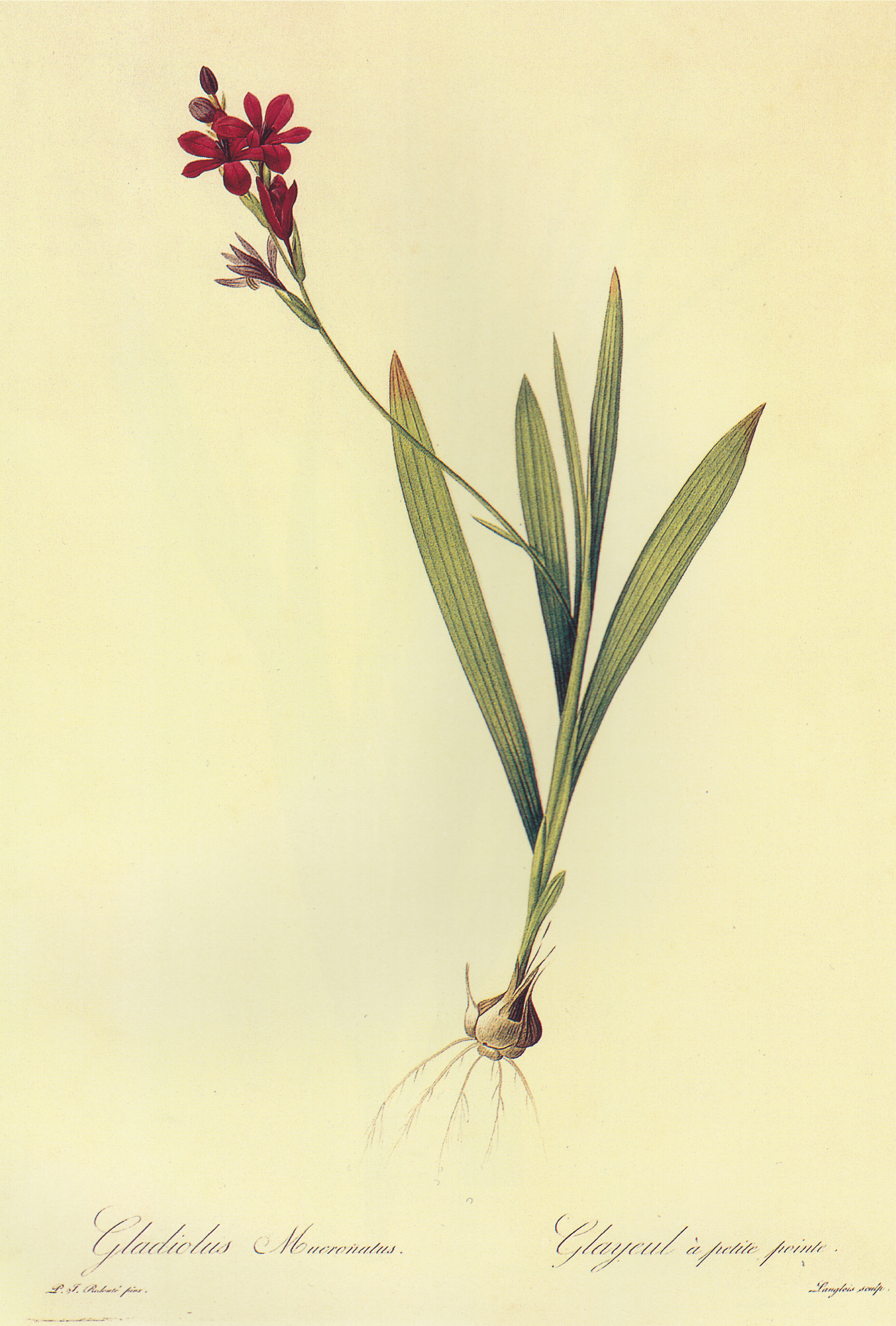
Etching of Gladiolus mucronatus by Pierre-Joseph Redouté

B. villosa was first described by Daniel Solander as Ixia villosa and it was published after his death in the first edition of the Hortus Kewensis that was compiled by William Aiton in 1789. Jean-Baptiste Lamarck described Gladiolus latifolius in 1791, Nikolaus Joseph von Jacquin Ixia punicea in 1794, and Augustin Pyramus de Candolle Gladiolus mucronatus in 1807 based on plants growing in France around that time. John Bellenden Ker Gawler, who had erected the genus Babiana in 1802, included Solander's species and so created the new name Babiana villosa. In her 1959 revision of the genus, Gwendoline Joyce Lewis distinguished B. villosa var. grandis and B. villosa var. villosa. In 2007, Peter Goldblatt and John Charles Manning considered Gladiolus latifolius, G. mucronatus and Ixia punicea as synonyms for B. villosa. According to Goldblatt and Manning represents Lewis's B. villosa var. grandis rooibobbejaantjie, while they regard the populations from Mamre that Lewis included in B. villosa var. villosa as a separate new species, B. melanops.

== Distribution, ecology and conservation ==
B. villosa can be found between Malmesbury and Wellington in the Western Cape province of South Africa. This species grows in on lower mountain slopes, hills and flats in fertile, stony clay in Breede Shale Renosterveld vegetation, often together with blue-flowered forms of Lachenalia unifolia, the pink orchid Satyrium erectum and Geissorhiza erosa with red flowers. The corms of B. villosa are difficult to gather as they are often found wedging in heavy clay soils between stones that become rock hard in summer, and so the corms are protected against baboons, porcupines, mole rats, that would gladly eat them. The corms start growing in autumn and through the winter months to flower during spring. It is still locally common in renosterveld remnants, in particular in the Tulbagh Valley. The species is pollinated by the monkey beetles Anisonyx ursus and A. ditus around Malmesbury, and Peritrichia rufotibialis and Lepithrix ornatella in the Tulbagh Valley. It has a range of nearly 2,000 km^{2} (770 mi^{2}) and is known from sixteen locations. It is however short-lived and has lost about 80% of its former habitat to agricultural development, especially olive cultivation and vineyards. Habitat loss continues to date and therefore B. villosa is regarded a near-threatened species.

== Use ==
B. villosa is cultivated by specialist bulb growers as a rock garden plant or in containers.
