= Peritrichia pulchella =

Scientific classification
- Kingdom: Animalia
- Phylum: Arthropoda
- Class: Insecta
- Order: Coleoptera
- Suborder: Polyphaga
- Infraorder: Scarabaeiformia
- Family: Scarabaeidae
- Genus: Peritrichia
- Species: P. pulchella

Binomial name
- Peritrichia pulchella Péringuey, 1902

Species of beetle

Peritrichia pulchella is a species of beetle of the family Scarabaeidae. It is found in South Africa (Western Cape).

== Description ==
Adults reach a length of about 7.5–8 mm (0.30–0.31 in). They resemble Peritrichia dimidiata and Peritrichia capicola, but there is no trace of discoidal hairy spots on the pronotum. The elytra are quite black, with the greyish pubescence darker in males, and they have a faint outer marginal band of elongate scales, which less dense or less conspicuous than in P. dimidiata. The pygidium is hairy and scaly only in females.
