= Peritrichia badiipennis =

Scientific classification
- Kingdom: Animalia
- Phylum: Arthropoda
- Class: Insecta
- Order: Coleoptera
- Suborder: Polyphaga
- Infraorder: Scarabaeiformia
- Family: Scarabaeidae
- Genus: Peritrichia
- Species: P. badiipennis

Binomial name
- Peritrichia badiipennis Schein, 1959

Species of beetle

Peritrichia badiipennis is a species of beetle of the family Scarabaeidae. It is found in South Africa (Western Cape).

== Description ==
Adults reach a length of about 9.5–10.5 mm (0.37–0.41 in). They are similar to Peritrichia tristis. They are black and scaled, with dark reddish-brown elytra and with a hairy abdomen similar to like Peritrichia abdominalis.
