= Peritrichia spuria =

Scientific classification
- Kingdom: Animalia
- Phylum: Arthropoda
- Class: Insecta
- Order: Coleoptera
- Suborder: Polyphaga
- Infraorder: Scarabaeiformia
- Family: Scarabaeidae
- Genus: Peritrichia
- Species: P. spuria

Binomial name
- Peritrichia spuria Péringuey, 1902

Species of beetle

Peritrichia spuria is a species of beetle of the family Scarabaeidae. It is found in South Africa (Western Cape, Eastern Cape).

== Description ==
Adults reach a length of about 7.5–8 mm (0.30–0.31 in). They are intermediate in shape between Peritrichia capicola and Peritrichia pistrinaria, but they are however, more closely related to the former, from which it differs by the deeper and much less closely set punctuation of the pronotum, and also by the two longitudinal impressions on each side of the elytra, which are divided by a more costate interval. The colour is black in males, with the elytra chestnut-red in females, and the pubescence round the head and thorax is white, but black on the dorsal part, and the erect hairs on the elytra are interspersed with white squamose ones as thick as in P. pistrinaria, but not quite so closely set.

== Subspecies ==
- Peritrichia spuria spuria (Western Cape, Eastern Cape)
- Peritrichia spuria pseudospuriella Schein, 1959 (Western Cape)
- Peritrichia spuria spuriella Schein, 1959 (Western Cape)
