= Peritrichia subsquamosa =

Scientific classification
- Kingdom: Animalia
- Phylum: Arthropoda
- Class: Insecta
- Order: Coleoptera
- Suborder: Polyphaga
- Infraorder: Scarabaeiformia
- Family: Scarabaeidae
- Genus: Peritrichia
- Species: P. subsquamosa

Binomial name
- Peritrichia subsquamosa Schein, 1959

Species of beetle

Peritrichia subsquamosa is a species of beetle of the family Scarabaeidae. It is found in South Africa (Western Cape).

== Description ==
Adults reach a length of about 8–9 mm (0.31–0.35 in). They are black and predominantly white-haired, related to Peritrichia capicola, but with finer, denser and shorter hairs, especially on the pygidial area.
