= Peritrichia pseudopistrinaria =

Scientific classification
- Kingdom: Animalia
- Phylum: Arthropoda
- Class: Insecta
- Order: Coleoptera
- Suborder: Polyphaga
- Infraorder: Scarabaeiformia
- Family: Scarabaeidae
- Genus: Peritrichia
- Species: P. pseudopistrinaria

Binomial name
- Peritrichia pseudopistrinaria Schein, 1959

Species of beetle

Peritrichia pseudopistrinaria is a species of beetle of the family Scarabaeidae. It is found in South Africa (Western Cape).

== Description ==
Adults reach a length of about 7–9 mm (0.28–0.35 in). They are similar to Peritrichia pistrinaria. They are black. The base of the elytra is black in males and reddish-brown in females. The pronotum of the females has a barely noticeable white border and the elytra in males have white scale-like hairs, instead of scales. In subspecies meridionalis, the ground colour of the elytra of the males is reddish-brown with a black border.

== Subspecies ==
- Peritrichia pseudopistrinaria pseudopistrinaria (South Africa: Western Cape)
- Peritrichia pseudopistrinaria meridionalis Schein, 1959 (South Africa: Western Cape)
