= Lepithrix kochi =

Scientific classification
- Kingdom: Animalia
- Phylum: Arthropoda
- Clade: Pancrustacea
- Class: Insecta
- Order: Coleoptera
- Suborder: Polyphaga
- Infraorder: Scarabaeiformia
- Family: Scarabaeidae
- Genus: Lepithrix
- Species: L. kochi

Binomial name
- Lepithrix kochi Schein, 1959

Species of beetle

Lepithrix kochi is a species of beetle of the family Scarabaeidae. It is found in South Africa (Western Cape).

== Description ==
Adults reach a length of about 7–8 mm (0.28–0.31 in). They are black with light brown elytra and legs, which are rarely darkened. They have markings similar to Lepithrix lineata, but the pronotum only has whitish-yellow hairs.
