= Peritrichia nigrovillosa =

Scientific classification
- Kingdom: Animalia
- Phylum: Arthropoda
- Class: Insecta
- Order: Coleoptera
- Suborder: Polyphaga
- Infraorder: Scarabaeiformia
- Family: Scarabaeidae
- Genus: Peritrichia
- Species: P. nigrovillosa

Binomial name
- Peritrichia nigrovillosa Péringuey, 1902

Species of beetle

Peritrichia nigrovillosa is a species of beetle of the family Scarabaeidae. It is found in South Africa (Eastern Cape).

== Description ==
Adults reach a length of about 6 mm (0.24 in). They are black and completely covered with brownish-black hairs. The ground colour is not completely dull. The spots are much coarser than in related Peritrichia nigrita.
