= Peritrichia pseudoplebeja =

Scientific classification
- Kingdom: Animalia
- Phylum: Arthropoda
- Class: Insecta
- Order: Coleoptera
- Suborder: Polyphaga
- Infraorder: Scarabaeiformia
- Family: Scarabaeidae
- Genus: Peritrichia
- Species: P. pseudoplebeja

Binomial name
- Peritrichia pseudoplebeja Schein, 1959

Species of beetle

Peritrichia pseudoplebeja is a species of beetle of the family Scarabaeidae. It is found in South Africa (Western Cape).

== Description ==
Adults reach a length of about 8–10 mm (0.31–0.39 in). They are similar to Peritrichia plebeja. They are black with brown elytra with white or yellowish spots. The legs are completely black.
