= Peritrichia nigromaculata =

Scientific classification
- Kingdom: Animalia
- Phylum: Arthropoda
- Class: Insecta
- Order: Coleoptera
- Suborder: Polyphaga
- Infraorder: Scarabaeiformia
- Family: Scarabaeidae
- Genus: Peritrichia
- Species: P. nigromaculata

Binomial name
- Peritrichia nigromaculata (Burmeister, 1844)

Synonyms
- Anisonyx nigromaculatus Burmeister, 1844

Species of beetle

Peritrichia nigromaculata is a species of beetle of the family Scarabaeidae. It is found in South Africa (Northern Cape).

== Description ==
Adults reach a length of about 6.5–7 mm (0.26–0.28 in). They are black, with the elytra light chocolate-brown. The head and pronotum are similar in shape and vestiture to those of Peritrichia guttata, but in the centre of the discoidal part of the pronotum there are two round, small, velvety black patches, and no scales. The scutellum is hairy and the elytra are clothed with short black hairs, and have seven small, velvety patches on each side.
