= Lepithrix fusca =

Scientific classification
- Kingdom: Animalia
- Phylum: Arthropoda
- Clade: Pancrustacea
- Class: Insecta
- Order: Coleoptera
- Suborder: Polyphaga
- Infraorder: Scarabaeiformia
- Family: Scarabaeidae
- Genus: Lepithrix
- Species: L. fusca

Binomial name
- Lepithrix fusca Schein, 1959

Synonyms
- Lepithrix namaqua fusca Schein, 1959; Lepithrix fuscus

Species of beetle

Lepithrix fusca is a species of beetle of the family Scarabaeidae. It is found in South Africa (Northern Cape).

== Description ==
Adults reach a length of about 7 mm (0.28 in). They are very similar to Lepithrix namaqua, but differs from it by its smaller size, darker reddish-brown elytra and black legs.
