= Peritrichia pseudursa =

Scientific classification
- Kingdom: Animalia
- Phylum: Arthropoda
- Class: Insecta
- Order: Coleoptera
- Suborder: Polyphaga
- Infraorder: Scarabaeiformia
- Family: Scarabaeidae
- Genus: Peritrichia
- Species: P. pseudursa

Binomial name
- Peritrichia pseudursa Schein, 1959

Species of beetle

Peritrichia pseudursa is a species of beetle of the family Scarabaeidae. It is found in South Africa (Western Cape).

== Description ==
Adults reach a length of about 9–10 mm (0.35–0.39 in). They are black and closely related to Peritrichia ursus. The base of the elytra is black or brownish-black in males and dark reddish-brown in females. The pubescence consists of mixed brownish-black and whitish hairs in both sexes.
