= Peritrichia pseudotristis =

Scientific classification
- Kingdom: Animalia
- Phylum: Arthropoda
- Class: Insecta
- Order: Coleoptera
- Suborder: Polyphaga
- Infraorder: Scarabaeiformia
- Family: Scarabaeidae
- Genus: Peritrichia
- Species: P. pseudotristis

Binomial name
- Peritrichia pseudotristis Schein, 1959

Species of beetle

Peritrichia pseudotristis is a species of beetle of the family Scarabaeidae. It is found in South Africa (Western Cape).

== Description ==
Adults reach a length of about 8.5 mm (0.33 in). They are similar to Peritrichia tristis. They have black hairs on the abdomen, and completely black legs.
