= Peritrichia dita =

Scientific classification
- Kingdom: Animalia
- Phylum: Arthropoda
- Class: Insecta
- Order: Coleoptera
- Suborder: Polyphaga
- Infraorder: Scarabaeiformia
- Family: Scarabaeidae
- Genus: Peritrichia
- Species: P. dita

Binomial name
- Peritrichia dita Péringuey, 1902

Species of beetle

Peritrichia dita is a species of beetle of the family Scarabaeidae. It is found in South Africa (Northern Cape).

== Description ==
Adults reach a length of about 6 mm (0.24 in). They are similar to Peritrichia ditissima, but smaller. The pronotum has arcuate bands of scales in the discoidal part in females only, the short hairs covering it and also the scales forming the basal band are white, and on the elytra, which have a border of white scales, are two transverse, non-interrupted bands of whitish scales. The pygidium and abdomen are scaly-white.
