= Peritrichia vansoni =

Scientific classification
- Kingdom: Animalia
- Phylum: Arthropoda
- Class: Insecta
- Order: Coleoptera
- Suborder: Polyphaga
- Infraorder: Scarabaeiformia
- Family: Scarabaeidae
- Genus: Peritrichia
- Species: P. vansoni

Binomial name
- Peritrichia vansoni Schein, 1959

Species of beetle

Peritrichia vansoni is a species of beetle of the family Scarabaeidae. It is found in South Africa (Western Cape).

== Description ==
Adults reach a length of about 5.5–6 mm (0.22–0.24 in). They are deep black and very similar to Peritrichia tristis.
