= Peritrichia proboscidea =

Scientific classification
- Kingdom: Animalia
- Phylum: Arthropoda
- Class: Insecta
- Order: Coleoptera
- Suborder: Polyphaga
- Infraorder: Scarabaeiformia
- Family: Scarabaeidae
- Genus: Peritrichia
- Species: P. proboscidea

Binomial name
- Peritrichia proboscidea (Fabricius, 1775)

Synonyms
- Melolontha proboscidea Fabricius, 1775

Species of beetle

Peritrichia proboscidea is a species of beetle of the family Scarabaeidae. It is found in South Africa (Western Cape).

== Description ==
Adults reach a length of about 7.5–10 mm (0.30–0.39 in). They are similar in form and colour to Peritrichia capicola. Males are black with pure black or reddish-brown, black-edged elytra, while females are uniformly reddish-brown. The elytra have hairs and white scales in the lateral and apical areas. The pygidium is covered with white hairs.
