= Peritrichia kochi =

Scientific classification
- Kingdom: Animalia
- Phylum: Arthropoda
- Class: Insecta
- Order: Coleoptera
- Suborder: Polyphaga
- Infraorder: Scarabaeiformia
- Family: Scarabaeidae
- Genus: Peritrichia
- Species: P. kochi

Binomial name
- Peritrichia kochi Schein, 1959

Species of beetle

Peritrichia kochi is a species of beetle of the family Scarabaeidae. It is found in South Africa (Northern Cape).

== Description ==
Adults reach a length of about 8–9 mm (0.31–0.35 in). They are black and related to Peritrichia guttata, with similar spots and also with the base of the elytra black. The pygidium of the males is yellow in the upper half, while the remaining pygidial part and the abdomen are white.
