= Lepithrix fulvipes =

Scientific classification
- Kingdom: Animalia
- Phylum: Arthropoda
- Class: Insecta
- Order: Coleoptera
- Suborder: Polyphaga
- Infraorder: Scarabaeiformia
- Family: Scarabaeidae
- Genus: Lepithrix
- Species: L. fulvipes

Binomial name
- Lepithrix fulvipes (Thunberg, 1818)

Synonyms
- Trichius fulvipes Thunberg, 1818; Lepithrix pseudomodesta Schein, 1959; Lepitrix modesta Péringuey, 1902

Species of beetle

Lepithrix fulvipes is a species of beetle of the family Scarabaeidae. It is found in South Africa (Western Cape).

== Description ==
Adults reach a length of about 8–8.25 mm (0.315–0.325 in). They are similar in shape to Lepithrix lineata, but a little smaller, and with the elytra paler and the legs redder. The pronotum has a narrow band of flavescent scales, which is denser along the anterior and posterior part than on the sides, and is sprinkled on the discoidal part with minute scales usually forming two short longitudinal bands, one on each side of the median part, and there is only a faint trace of some pallid scales around the apical part of each elytron.
