= Lepithrix hilaris =

Scientific classification
- Kingdom: Animalia
- Phylum: Arthropoda
- Class: Insecta
- Order: Coleoptera
- Suborder: Polyphaga
- Infraorder: Scarabaeiformia
- Family: Scarabaeidae
- Genus: Lepithrix
- Species: L. hilaris

Binomial name
- Lepithrix hilaris Péringuey, 1902

Species of beetle

Lepithrix hilaris is a species of beetle of the family Scarabaeidae. It is found in South Africa at Western Cape, Eastern Cape.

== Description ==
Adults reach a length of about 9 mm (0.35 in). They are similar to Lepithrix stigma, but the clypeus is more obliquely attenuated laterally from the median part to the outer angle which is distinctly sharp, whereas it is rounded in L. stigma. There is no trace of scales or appressed hairs on the margins of the pronotum, but the hairs are not black or fuscous, but fulvous. The elytra are a little redder, but also clothed with black hairs, and the sutural and posterior marginal band of scales are similar, but the scales are more orange-yellow.
