= Peritrichia albovillosa =

Scientific classification
- Kingdom: Animalia
- Phylum: Arthropoda
- Class: Insecta
- Order: Coleoptera
- Suborder: Polyphaga
- Infraorder: Scarabaeiformia
- Family: Scarabaeidae
- Genus: Peritrichia
- Species: P. albovillosa

Binomial name
- Peritrichia albovillosa Schein, 1959

Species of beetle

Peritrichia albovillosa is a species of beetle of the family Scarabaeidae. It is found in South Africa (Western Cape).

== Description ==
Adults reach a length of about 8–9 mm (0.31–0.35 in). They are black and similar to Peritrichia capicola, but with pure white, long and dense hairs. The disc of the elytra is reddish-brown.
