= Lepithrix forsteri =

Scientific classification
- Kingdom: Animalia
- Phylum: Arthropoda
- Clade: Pancrustacea
- Class: Insecta
- Order: Coleoptera
- Suborder: Polyphaga
- Infraorder: Scarabaeiformia
- Family: Scarabaeidae
- Genus: Lepithrix
- Species: L. forsteri

Binomial name
- Lepithrix forsteri Schein, 1959

Species of beetle

Lepithrix forsteri is a species of beetle of the family Scarabaeidae. It is found in South Africa (Northern Cape).

== Description ==
Adults reach a length of about 6–6.5 mm (0.24–0.26 in). They are black with reddish-brown elytra. They are similar to Lepithrix lebisi, but has lighter yellow scales. Furthermore, males do not have disc spots on the pronotum, the sutural band of the elytra ends at the scutellum and there is a yellow scale border along the outer margin.
