= Peritrichia braunsi =

Scientific classification
- Kingdom: Animalia
- Phylum: Arthropoda
- Class: Insecta
- Order: Coleoptera
- Suborder: Polyphaga
- Infraorder: Scarabaeiformia
- Family: Scarabaeidae
- Genus: Peritrichia
- Species: P. braunsi

Binomial name
- Peritrichia braunsi Schein, 1959

Species of beetle

Peritrichia braunsi is a species of beetle of the family Scarabaeidae. It is found in South Africa (Eastern Cape).

== Description ==
Adults reach a length of about 5.5–6 mm (0.22–0.24 in). They are similar to Peritrichia tristis. They are black with brown elytra and either with or without yellow spots on the disc of the pronotum, while the elytra always have yellow spots. The propygidium is densely covered with golden-yellow scales along the margin, while the pygidium is black and scaleless.
