= Peritrichia cognata =

Scientific classification
- Kingdom: Animalia
- Phylum: Arthropoda
- Class: Insecta
- Order: Coleoptera
- Suborder: Polyphaga
- Infraorder: Scarabaeiformia
- Family: Scarabaeidae
- Genus: Peritrichia
- Species: P. cognata

Binomial name
- Peritrichia cognata Péringuey, 1902

Species of beetle

Peritrichia cognata is a species of beetle of the family Scarabaeidae. It is found in South Africa (Western Cape).

== Description ==
Adults reach a length of about 8 mm (0.31 in). They are very similar in shape and vestiture to Peritrichia nitidipennis, but the elytra are darker brown, and the hairs are shorter and entirely black on the upper sides, and also on the sides of the abdomen and on the legs, but in the central part of the abdomen they are slightly greyish in both sexes.
