= Peritrichia andreaei =

Scientific classification
- Kingdom: Animalia
- Phylum: Arthropoda
- Class: Insecta
- Order: Coleoptera
- Suborder: Polyphaga
- Infraorder: Scarabaeiformia
- Family: Scarabaeidae
- Genus: Peritrichia
- Species: P. andreaei

Binomial name
- Peritrichia andreaei Schein, 1959

Species of beetle

Peritrichia andreaei is a species of beetle of the family Scarabaeidae. It is found in South Africa (Western Cape, Eastern Cape).

== Description ==
Adults reach a length of about 7–8 mm (0.28–0.31 in). They are black and similar to Peritrichia ditissima. The elytra are brown at the front and black at the back, and have two bands.

== Subspecies ==
- Peritrichia andreaei andreaei (South Africa: Western Cape)
- Peritrichia andreaei willowmorensis Schein, 1959 (South Africa: Eastern Cape)
