= Peritrichia pseudopuberula =

Scientific classification
- Kingdom: Animalia
- Phylum: Arthropoda
- Class: Insecta
- Order: Coleoptera
- Suborder: Polyphaga
- Infraorder: Scarabaeiformia
- Family: Scarabaeidae
- Genus: Peritrichia
- Species: P. pseudopuberula

Binomial name
- Peritrichia pseudopuberula Schein, 1959

Species of beetle

Peritrichia pseudopuberula is a species of beetle of the family Scarabaeidae. It is found in South Africa (Northern Cape).

== Description ==
Adults reach a length of about 6 mm (0.24 in). They are black, with the elytra reddish-brown with black suture and a black border. Otherwise, they are nearly identical in shape and sculpture to Peritrichia puberula.
