= Peritrichia rigida =

Scientific classification
- Kingdom: Animalia
- Phylum: Arthropoda
- Class: Insecta
- Order: Coleoptera
- Suborder: Polyphaga
- Infraorder: Scarabaeiformia
- Family: Scarabaeidae
- Genus: Peritrichia
- Species: P. rigida

Binomial name
- Peritrichia rigida Schein, 1959

Species of beetle

Peritrichia rigida is a species of beetle of the family Scarabaeidae. It is found in South Africa (Western Cape).

== Description ==
Adults reach a length of about 9–10.5 mm (0.35–0.41 in). Males are velvety deep black, while females are dark reddish-brown on the elytra. There are scattered white scales on the elytra. There are stiff, erect, shorter white and longer black hairs on the whole body. The underside and pygidial part are densely white-scaled and hairy.
