= Lepithrix gentilis =

Scientific classification
- Kingdom: Animalia
- Phylum: Arthropoda
- Class: Insecta
- Order: Coleoptera
- Suborder: Polyphaga
- Infraorder: Scarabaeiformia
- Family: Scarabaeidae
- Genus: Lepithrix
- Species: L. gentilis

Binomial name
- Lepithrix gentilis Péringuey, 1902

Species of beetle

Lepithrix gentilis is a species of beetle of the family Scarabaeidae. It is found in South Africa (Western Cape).

== Description ==
Adults reach a length of about 8–9 mm (0.31–0.35 in). They are black, with the elytra brownish red, sometimes slightly infuscate laterally. The pronotum is margined all round with flavescent scales, and has two small patches of similar ones in the discoidal part. The elytra have a semicircular band of flavescent scales near the base, formed by two coalescing patches on each side and extending from the inner part of one humeral angle to the other, in the posterior part there is a longitudinal crescent-shaped band along the suture and the rounded apical part, and above the outer margin are two elongate patches of similar scales. These patches and bands are sometimes partly obliterated, especially when the impressions on which they are situated are shallow, for they vary in depth. The pygidium and propygidium are clothed with scales and short, squamulose hairs, and the abdomen with whitish squamose hairs and a greyish pubescence.
