= Peritrichia pygidialis =

Scientific classification
- Kingdom: Animalia
- Phylum: Arthropoda
- Class: Insecta
- Order: Coleoptera
- Suborder: Polyphaga
- Infraorder: Scarabaeiformia
- Family: Scarabaeidae
- Genus: Peritrichia
- Species: P. pygidialis

Binomial name
- Peritrichia pygidialis Péringuey, 1902

Species of beetle

Peritrichia pygidialis is a species of beetle of the family Scarabaeidae. It is found in South Africa (Western Cape, Eastern Cape).

== Description ==
Adults reach a length of about 8.5–10 mm (0.33–0.39 in). They are black, with the elytra light testaceous and very broadly infuscate laterally. The head and pronotum are clothed with very long hairs, which in males are white along the apical margin of the pronotum and on the sides, but are mixed with greyish-black ones in the discoidal part, and also have a transverse median band of white hairs there. In females, these hairs are flavescent, there are no scales, nor are there any on the elytra. The elytra are clothed with whitish or slightly flavescent hairs, and have on each side at tip a small outer hairy white patch. The propygidium and pygidium are clothed with black hairs, and in the central part there is a broad white band consisting of lanuginose sub-squamose appressed ones in both sexes.
