= Lepithrix stigma =

Scientific classification
- Kingdom: Animalia
- Phylum: Arthropoda
- Clade: Pancrustacea
- Class: Insecta
- Order: Coleoptera
- Suborder: Polyphaga
- Infraorder: Scarabaeiformia
- Family: Scarabaeidae
- Genus: Lepithrix
- Species: L. stigma

Binomial name
- Lepithrix stigma (De Geer, 1778)

Synonyms
- Scarabaeus stigma DeGeer, 1778; Trichius fuscipes Thunberg, 1818; Trichius nigripes Fabricius, 1781

Species of beetle

Lepithrix stigma is a species of beetle of the family Scarabaeidae. It is found in South Africa (Western Cape, Eastern Cape).

== Description ==
Adults reach a length of about 8–9 mm (0.31–0.35 in). They are black, with the elytra a little darker chestnut-brown than in Lepithrix lineata. The elytra are not quite so elongate and are therefore not quite as triangular, and each elytron is separately rounded at apex. The pronotum has a narrow margin of yellow scales, but no discoidal bands, and the scutellum is covered with scales. On the elytra, there is a moderately broad sutural band of flavescent scales beginning past the median part and continuing round the posterior margin head as in A. lineata, but the clypeus is slightly obliquely narrowed laterally from about the median part, the outer angles are not rounded, and it is somewhat deeply emarginate at apex. The elytra are clothed with erect black hairs.
