= Peritrichia flavoornata =

Scientific classification
- Kingdom: Animalia
- Phylum: Arthropoda
- Clade: Pancrustacea
- Class: Insecta
- Order: Coleoptera
- Suborder: Polyphaga
- Infraorder: Scarabaeiformia
- Family: Scarabaeidae
- Genus: Peritrichia
- Species: P. flavoornata

Binomial name
- Peritrichia flavoornata Moser, 1918

Species of beetle

Peritrichia flavoornata is a species of beetle of the family Scarabaeidae. It is found in Namibia and South Africa (Northern Cape).

== Description ==
Adults reach a length of about 7–11 mm (0.28–0.43 in). They are black with dark brown elytra. The pronotum has a margin of scales and two comma-shaped disc spots. The elytra each have a scale band along the suture and outer margin, and a longitudinal band between them. These bands are yellow in males and more whitish in females.
