= Peritrichia bella =

Scientific classification
- Kingdom: Animalia
- Phylum: Arthropoda
- Clade: Pancrustacea
- Class: Insecta
- Order: Coleoptera
- Suborder: Polyphaga
- Infraorder: Scarabaeiformia
- Family: Scarabaeidae
- Genus: Peritrichia
- Species: P. bella

Binomial name
- Peritrichia bella (Moser, 1918)

Synonyms
- Eriesthis bella Moser, 1918

Species of beetle

Peritrichia bella is a species of beetle of the family Scarabaeidae. It is found in Burundi and Namibia.

== Description ==
Adults reach a length of about 5–6 mm (0.20–0.24 in). The ground colour is black, while the entire scale margin of the pronotum is white (but yellow at the rear). There may be disc spots, but these are regularly absent, and sometimes replaced by a few light hairs. The elytra have white or yellow lateral and posterior margins and two narrow transverse bands.
