= Peritrichia rufotibialis =

Scientific classification
- Kingdom: Animalia
- Phylum: Arthropoda
- Class: Insecta
- Order: Coleoptera
- Suborder: Polyphaga
- Infraorder: Scarabaeiformia
- Family: Scarabaeidae
- Genus: Peritrichia
- Species: P. rufotibialis

Binomial name
- Peritrichia rufotibialis Schein, 1959

Species of beetle

Peritrichia rufotibialis is a species of beetle of the family Scarabaeidae. It is found in South Africa (Western Cape).

== Description ==
Adults reach a length of about 8 mm (0.31 in). They are black, unspotted and similar to Peritrichia plebeja, but may be distinguished by the reddish-brown tibiae and tarsi of all leg pairs.
