= Peritrichia puberula =

Scientific classification
- Kingdom: Animalia
- Phylum: Arthropoda
- Class: Insecta
- Order: Coleoptera
- Suborder: Polyphaga
- Infraorder: Scarabaeiformia
- Family: Scarabaeidae
- Genus: Peritrichia
- Species: P. puberula

Binomial name
- Peritrichia puberula Péringuey, 1902

Species of beetle

Peritrichia puberula is a species of beetle of the family Scarabaeidae. It is found in South Africa (Western Cape).

== Description ==
Adults reach a length of about 6 mm (0.24 in). They are black, with the elytra light fulvous and the suture and the outer margins slightly infuscate. They have a marginal band of not closely set greyish-white scales. The shape of the clypeus, the colour and disposition of the hairs covering the upper and outer side in both sexes is similar to those of Peritrichia capicola, and it also has two discoidal small hairy spots. It is however much smaller, the elytra are more acuminate in proportion to the size, and the pygidial area and the abdomen are distinctly scaly in both sexes.
