= Peritrichia fasciata =

Scientific classification
- Kingdom: Animalia
- Phylum: Arthropoda
- Class: Insecta
- Order: Coleoptera
- Suborder: Polyphaga
- Infraorder: Scarabaeiformia
- Family: Scarabaeidae
- Genus: Peritrichia
- Species: P. fasciata

Binomial name
- Peritrichia fasciata (Burmeister, 1844)

Synonyms
- Anisonyx fasciatus Burmeister, 1844

Species of beetle

Peritrichia fasciata is a species of beetle of the family Scarabaeidae. It is found in South Africa (Northern Cape).

== Description ==
They are black and hairy, with the elytra reddish at the base and having two posterior bands which, like the margins of the pronotum, consist of white scales.
