= Lepithrix freudei =

Scientific classification
- Kingdom: Animalia
- Phylum: Arthropoda
- Clade: Pancrustacea
- Class: Insecta
- Order: Coleoptera
- Suborder: Polyphaga
- Infraorder: Scarabaeiformia
- Family: Scarabaeidae
- Genus: Lepithrix
- Species: L. freudei

Binomial name
- Lepithrix freudei Schein, 1959

Species of beetle

Lepithrix freudei is a species of beetle of the family Scarabaeidae. It is found in South Africa (Northern Cape, Western Cape).

== Description ==
Adults reach a length of about 7 mm (0.28 in). They are black with a white-bordered pronotum which also has two disc-shaped spots. The elytra are pale dark brown and without scales. The pygidial part, thorax and abdomen have pure white scales and are hairy. The forelegs and middle legs are dark red, while the hindlegs are black.
