= Peritrichia bicolor =

Scientific classification
- Kingdom: Animalia
- Phylum: Arthropoda
- Class: Insecta
- Order: Coleoptera
- Suborder: Polyphaga
- Infraorder: Scarabaeiformia
- Family: Scarabaeidae
- Genus: Peritrichia
- Species: P. bicolor

Binomial name
- Peritrichia bicolor Schein, 1959

Species of beetle

Peritrichia bicolor is a species of beetle of the family Scarabaeidae. It is found in South Africa (Northern Cape).

== Description ==
Adults reach a length of about 6.5–7 mm (0.26–0.28 in). They are black, with red elytra without any scales.
