= Peritrichia hessei =

Scientific classification
- Kingdom: Animalia
- Phylum: Arthropoda
- Class: Insecta
- Order: Coleoptera
- Suborder: Polyphaga
- Infraorder: Scarabaeiformia
- Family: Scarabaeidae
- Genus: Peritrichia
- Species: P. hessei

Binomial name
- Peritrichia hessei Schein, 1959

Species of beetle

Peritrichia hessei is a species of beetle of the family Scarabaeidae. It is found in South Africa (Western Cape, Northern Cape).

== Description ==
Adults reach a length of about 7–8 mm (0.28–0.31 in). They are black or pitch-black. The rear of the elytra is strongly rounded and white-edged in both males and females, but the colour of the elytra is different, being black in males and coffee-brown in females. There are no transverse bands on the elytra, as in related species.
