= Peritrichia cinerea =

Scientific classification
- Kingdom: Animalia
- Phylum: Arthropoda
- Clade: Pancrustacea
- Class: Insecta
- Order: Coleoptera
- Suborder: Polyphaga
- Infraorder: Scarabaeiformia
- Family: Scarabaeidae
- Genus: Peritrichia
- Species: P. cinerea

Binomial name
- Peritrichia cinerea (Olivier, 1789)

Synonyms
- Melolontha cinerea Olivier, 1789; Melolontha impexa Wiedemann, 1823; Melolontha mutabilis Herbst, 1790

Species of beetle

Peritrichia cinerea is a species of beetle of the family Scarabaeidae. It is found in South Africa (Western Cape).

== Description ==
Adults reach a length of about 8–9 mm (0.31–0.35 in). The base of the upper surface is somewhat glossy and black. The upper surface has greyish, erect pubescence, while the pubescence of the underside is white. Males have bushy greyish-white pubescence on the hind tibiae.
