= Peritrichia ypsilon =

Scientific classification
- Kingdom: Animalia
- Phylum: Arthropoda
- Class: Insecta
- Order: Coleoptera
- Suborder: Polyphaga
- Infraorder: Scarabaeiformia
- Family: Scarabaeidae
- Genus: Peritrichia
- Species: P. ypsilon

Binomial name
- Peritrichia ypsilon Schein, 1959

Species of beetle

Peritrichia ypsilon is a species of beetle of the family Scarabaeidae. It is found in South Africa (Western Cape).

== Description ==
Adults reach a length of about 9–11 mm (0.35–0.43 in). They are black. Males have black elytra, while these are brown in females. There is a white, Y-shaped marking on the pronotum, which also has a white border. The elytra are covered with scattered white scales, short white hairs and widely spaced, long, black hairs.
