= Lepithrix propygidialis =

Scientific classification
- Kingdom: Animalia
- Phylum: Arthropoda
- Class: Insecta
- Order: Coleoptera
- Suborder: Polyphaga
- Infraorder: Scarabaeiformia
- Family: Scarabaeidae
- Genus: Lepithrix
- Species: L. propygidialis

Binomial name
- Lepithrix propygidialis Schein, 1959

Species of beetle

Lepithrix propygidialis is a species of beetle of the family Scarabaeidae. It is found in South Africa (Western Cape).

== Description ==
Adults reach a length of about 6.5 mm (0.26 in). They are black with pale brown elytra (but darkened at the margin and suture). The pronotum has a slim margin of white hairs and the scutellum has white scale-like hairs. The propygidium is densely white-scaled and the pygidium is glossy, brownish-black and without scales and hairs. The underside has white hairs. The legs are red (front legs), brown (middle legs) and black (hindlegs).
