= Peritrichia hirtipes =

Scientific classification
- Kingdom: Animalia
- Phylum: Arthropoda
- Class: Insecta
- Order: Coleoptera
- Suborder: Polyphaga
- Infraorder: Scarabaeiformia
- Family: Scarabaeidae
- Genus: Peritrichia
- Species: P. hirtipes

Binomial name
- Peritrichia hirtipes (Péringuey, 1885)

Synonyms
- Lepitrix hirtipes Péringuey, 1885

Species of beetle

Peritrichia hirtipes is a species of beetle of the family Scarabaeidae. It is found in South Africa (Northern Cape).

== Description ==
Adults reach a length of about 6 mm (0.24 in). They are black, with the elytra piceous, or sometimes piceous-red. The head and pronotum are clothed with black hairs, and the latter has a faint basal margin of squamiform hairs and a few scales, a lateral, median marginal somewhat distinct patch of white scales, and a smaller one at the anterior angle. The scutellum is slightly scaly. The elytra are somewhat densely covered with erect black hairs, narrowly marginate with white scales which also ascend the posterior part of the suture, and they have two transverse, somewhat arcuate bands of similar scales extending across the dorsal part. The propygidium, pygidium and abdomen are entirely clothed with white scales.
