= Peritrichia (beetle) =

Scientific classification
- Kingdom: Animalia
- Phylum: Arthropoda
- Class: Insecta
- Order: Coleoptera
- Suborder: Polyphaga
- Infraorder: Scarabaeiformia
- Family: Scarabaeidae
- Subfamily: Melolonthinae
- Tribe: Hopliini
- Genus: Peritrichia; Burmeister, 1844

Synonyms
- Pherocoma Blanchard, 1850

Genus of leaf beetles

Peritrichia is a genus of beetles belonging to the family Scarabaeidae.

== Species ==
- Peritrichia abdominalis (Blanchard, 1850)
- Peritrichia albovillosa Schein, 1959
- Peritrichia andreaei Schein, 1959
- Peritrichia antennata Schein, 1959
- Peritrichia aterrima Schein, 1959
- Peritrichia badiipennis Schein, 1959
- Peritrichia bella (Moser, 1918)
- Peritrichia bicolor Schein, 1959
- Peritrichia braunsi Schein, 1959
- Peritrichia capicola (Fabricius, 1801)
- Peritrichia cinerea (Olivier, 1789)
- Peritrichia cognata Péringuey, 1902
- Peritrichia dimidiata Burmeister, 1844
- Peritrichia dita Péringuey, 1902
- Peritrichia ditissima Péringuey, 1902
- Peritrichia dubia Schein, 1959
- Peritrichia fasciata (Burmeister, 1844)
- Peritrichia flabellata Schein, 1959
- Peritrichia flavoornata Moser, 1918
- Peritrichia guttata (Burmeister, 1844)
- Peritrichia hessei Schein, 1959
- Peritrichia hirtipes (Péringuey, 1885)
- Peritrichia hybrida Péringuey, 1902
- Peritrichia kochi Schein, 1959
- Peritrichia nigrita Blanchard, 1850
- Peritrichia nigromaculata (Burmeister, 1844)
- Peritrichia nigrovillosa Péringuey, 1902
- Peritrichia nitidipennis Blanchard, 1850
- Peritrichia nuda Schein, 1959
- Peritrichia pistrinaria (Péringuey, 1888)
- Peritrichia plebeja Péringuey, 1902
- Peritrichia podicalis Schein, 1959
- Peritrichia proboscidea (Fabricius, 1775)
- Peritrichia pseudopistrinaria Schein, 1959
- Peritrichia pseudoplebeja Schein, 1959
- Peritrichia pseudopuberula Schein, 1959
- Peritrichia pseudotristis Schein, 1959
- Peritrichia pseudursa Schein, 1959
- Peritrichia puberula Péringuey, 1902
- Peritrichia pulchella Péringuey, 1902
- Peritrichia pygidialis Péringuey, 1902
- Peritrichia rigida Schein, 1959
- Peritrichia rufotibialis Schein, 1959
- Peritrichia saga Péringuey, 1902
- Peritrichia spuria Péringuey, 1902
- Peritrichia subsquamosa Schein, 1959
- Peritrichia tristis (Burmeister, 1844)
- Peritrichia ursus (Olivier, 1789)
- Peritrichia vansoni Schein, 1959
- Peritrichia ypsilon Schein, 1959

== Species of unknown identity ==
The identity of the following species described by Thunberg in Memoires de l'Academie Imperiale des sciences de St. Petersburg, Tome IV in 1818 is unclear. According to Schein, it is likely that these names refer to Peritrichia-species described later under a different name. However, Thunberg's descriptions are too brief and ambiguous. These species of unknown identity, all described from 'Cape' in South Africa, are:

- Peritrichia capucina (Thunberg, 1818) (described as Trichius capucinus)
- Peritrichia monacha (Thunberg, 1818) (described as Trichius monachus)
- Peritrichia ovina (Thunberg, 1818) (described as Trichius ovinus)
- Peritrichia ursula (Thunberg, 1818) (described as Trichius ursula)
