= Peritrichia flabellata =

Scientific classification
- Kingdom: Animalia
- Phylum: Arthropoda
- Class: Insecta
- Order: Coleoptera
- Suborder: Polyphaga
- Infraorder: Scarabaeiformia
- Family: Scarabaeidae
- Genus: Peritrichia
- Species: P. flabellata

Binomial name
- Peritrichia flabellata Schein, 1959

Species of beetle

Peritrichia flabellata is a species of beetle of the family Scarabaeidae. It is found in South Africa (Western Cape).

== Description ==
Adults reach a length of about 9–10.5 mm (0.35–0.41 in). They are black with reddish-brown elytra with white scales around the apex. The upper surface has black hairs, while the hairs on the underside are greyish-white. The hind tibiae have dense, bushy brownish-black hairs.
