= Lepithrix dichropus =

Scientific classification
- Kingdom: Animalia
- Phylum: Arthropoda
- Class: Insecta
- Order: Coleoptera
- Suborder: Polyphaga
- Infraorder: Scarabaeiformia
- Family: Scarabaeidae
- Genus: Lepithrix
- Species: L. dichropus

Binomial name
- Lepithrix dichropus Blanchard, 1850

Species of beetle

Lepithrix dichropus is a species of beetle of the family Scarabaeidae. It is found in South Africa (Western Cape).

== Description ==
Adults reach a length of about 8–9 mm (0.31–0.35 in). They are black, with the elytra mahogany colour. The head and pronotum are clothed with very dense black hairs. The elytra are broadly but shallowly sulcate along the suture and have this sulcus filled with black not closely set scales which also occasionally form a narrow band in the posterior part above the outer margin, the suture is bristly and the whole surface has seriate, black, erect hairs. The pygidium and abdomen are closely punctured and clothed with black hairs mixed with a few greyish ones. The legs are black.
