= Lepithrix xanthoptera =

Scientific classification
- Kingdom: Animalia
- Phylum: Arthropoda
- Class: Insecta
- Order: Coleoptera
- Suborder: Polyphaga
- Infraorder: Scarabaeiformia
- Family: Scarabaeidae
- Genus: Lepithrix
- Species: L. xanthoptera

Binomial name
- Lepithrix xanthoptera (Burmeister, 1844)

Synonyms
- Lepitrix xanthoptera Burmeister, 1844

Species of beetle

Lepithrix xanthoptera is a species of beetle of the family Scarabaeidae. It is found in South Africa (Northern Cape).

== Description ==
Adults reach a length of about 7 mm (0.28 in). They are black, with the elytra somewhat brick-red in males, but paler in females. The pronotum has only a few whitish scales along the outer margins and the elytra also have only a few scales, which are even very often obliterated in the rounded apical part. The pygidium is covered with somewhat flavescent scales.
