= Peritrichia aterrima =

Scientific classification
- Kingdom: Animalia
- Phylum: Arthropoda
- Class: Insecta
- Order: Coleoptera
- Suborder: Polyphaga
- Infraorder: Scarabaeiformia
- Family: Scarabaeidae
- Genus: Peritrichia
- Species: P. aterrima

Binomial name
- Peritrichia aterrima Schein, 1959

Species of beetle

Peritrichia aterrima is a species of beetle of the family Scarabaeidae. It is found in South Africa (Western Cape).

== Description ==
Adults reach a length of about 10 mm (0.39 in). They are dull black, with long, black hairs, while the hairs on the abdomen are brownish.
