= Peritrichia podicalis =

Scientific classification
- Kingdom: Animalia
- Phylum: Arthropoda
- Class: Insecta
- Order: Coleoptera
- Suborder: Polyphaga
- Infraorder: Scarabaeiformia
- Family: Scarabaeidae
- Genus: Peritrichia
- Species: P. podicalis

Binomial name
- Peritrichia podicalis Schein, 1959

Species of beetle

Peritrichia podicalis is a species of beetle of the family Scarabaeidae. It is found in South Africa (Northern Cape).

== Description ==
Adults reach a length of about 7 mm (0.28 in). They are black with black with brown elytra without spots. A broad marginal band of the propygidium and the entire pygidium have dense brick-red scaling.
