= Peritrichia nuda =

Scientific classification
- Kingdom: Animalia
- Phylum: Arthropoda
- Class: Insecta
- Order: Coleoptera
- Suborder: Polyphaga
- Infraorder: Scarabaeiformia
- Family: Scarabaeidae
- Genus: Peritrichia
- Species: P. nuda

Binomial name
- Peritrichia nuda Schein, 1959

Species of beetle

Peritrichia nuda is a species of beetle of the family Scarabaeidae. It is found in South Africa (Northern Cape).

== Description ==
Adults reach a length of about 7 mm (0.28 in). They are black with no scales on the upper surface and without markings.
