= Peritrichia hybrida =

Scientific classification
- Kingdom: Animalia
- Phylum: Arthropoda
- Class: Insecta
- Order: Coleoptera
- Suborder: Polyphaga
- Infraorder: Scarabaeiformia
- Family: Scarabaeidae
- Genus: Peritrichia
- Species: P. hybrida

Binomial name
- Peritrichia hybrida Péringuey, 1902

Species of beetle

Peritrichia hybrida is a species of beetle of the family Scarabaeidae. It is found in South Africa (Eastern Cape).

== Description ==
Adults reach a length of about 6.5–7 mm (0.26–0.28 in). They are black, with the elytra light testaceous. The head is covered with yellow hairs and the pronotum is edged all around with slightly lanuginose yellow hairs and with black ones mixed with a few yellow ones on the disk in the median part of which are two small, very distinct flavous, squamulose patches. In females, the hairs along the base are more squamose. The elytra are clothed with very long and very dense yellow hairs, among which are a few black ones, which are more numerous near the base. The propygidium and pygidium are densely hairy, with yellow hairs. The abdomen is also densely hairy, with the hairs yellow on the sides, but whitish in the middle.
