= Lepithrix longitarsis =

Scientific classification
- Kingdom: Animalia
- Phylum: Arthropoda
- Class: Insecta
- Order: Coleoptera
- Suborder: Polyphaga
- Infraorder: Scarabaeiformia
- Family: Scarabaeidae
- Genus: Lepithrix
- Species: L. longitarsis

Binomial name
- Lepithrix longitarsis Schein, 1959

Synonyms
- Lepithrix pseudolineata Schein, 1959; Lepithrix pseudolineata insquamosa Schein, 1959; Lepithrix pseudolineata nigrescens Schein, 1959; Lepithrix pseudolineata obscurior Schein, 1959

Species of beetle

Lepithrix longitarsis is a species of beetle of the family Scarabaeidae. It is found in South Africa (Western Cape).

== Description ==
Adults reach a length of about 8–9 mm (0.31–0.35 in). They are black with dark reddish-brown elytra without scales and without bands of hairs. They have black pubescence, although it is white on the thorax and the middle of the abdomen. The legs are black.
