= Peritrichia dubia =

Scientific classification
- Kingdom: Animalia
- Phylum: Arthropoda
- Class: Insecta
- Order: Coleoptera
- Suborder: Polyphaga
- Infraorder: Scarabaeiformia
- Family: Scarabaeidae
- Genus: Peritrichia
- Species: P. dubia

Binomial name
- Peritrichia dubia Schein, 1959

Species of beetle

Peritrichia dubia is a species of beetle of the family Scarabaeidae. It is found in South Africa (Western Cape).

== Description ==
Adults reach a length of about 6 mm (0.24 in). They are black, with a blurred reddish-brown translucent, small disc-shaped spot on the elytra. The anterior margin of the pronotum is white and there are white spots on the sides of the propygidium and pygidium, as well as a grey comb of hairs on the hind tibiae.
