= Peritrichia nigrita =

Scientific classification
- Kingdom: Animalia
- Phylum: Arthropoda
- Class: Insecta
- Order: Coleoptera
- Suborder: Polyphaga
- Infraorder: Scarabaeiformia
- Family: Scarabaeidae
- Genus: Peritrichia
- Species: P. nigrita

Binomial name
- Peritrichia nigrita Blanchard, 1850

Species of beetle

Peritrichia nigrita is a species of beetle of the family Scarabaeidae. It is found in South Africa (Western Cape).

== Description ==
Adults reach a length of about 8 mm (0.31 in). They are black, clothed in males with black hairs and light fulvous ones in females. They are smaller than Peritrichia ursus, and the elytra are more attenuated towards the apex. The shape of the clypeus is similar and the hairs are as abundant, but they are denser and longer on the elytra which show no trace of scales. Also, the hairs on the abdomen of the males are black. In females, the four abdominal segments are covered not only with long, soft (villose) hairs but also with a layer of flat, grayish hairs that lie closely against the surface. In both sexes, the hind legs are densely covered with long hairs.
