= Lepithrix =

Scientific classification
- Kingdom: Animalia
- Phylum: Arthropoda
- Class: Insecta
- Order: Coleoptera
- Suborder: Polyphaga
- Infraorder: Scarabaeiformia
- Family: Scarabaeidae
- Subfamily: Melolonthinae
- Tribe: Hopliini
- Genus: Lepithrix; Le Peletier & Audinet-Serville, 1828

Synonyms
- Lepitrix Le Peletier de Saint-Fargeau & Audinet-Serville, 1828

Genus of leaf beetles

Lepithrix is a genus of beetles belonging to the family Scarabaeidae.

== Species ==
- Lepithrix albomaculata Dombrow, 2001
- Lepithrix baehri Dombrow, 2000
- Lepithrix castaneus Dombrow, 2007
- Lepithrix cederbergensis Dombrow, 2005
- Lepithrix colvillei Dombrow, 2007
- Lepithrix dichropus Blanchard, 1850
- Lepithrix forsteri Schein, 1959
- Lepithrix freudei Schein, 1959
- Lepithrix fulvipes (Thunberg, 1818)
- Lepithrix fusca Schein, 1959
- Lepithrix gentilis Péringuey, 1902
- Lepithrix gifbergensis Dombrow, 2005
- Lepithrix hilaris Péringuey, 1902
- Lepithrix knersvlaktensis Dombrow, 2007
- Lepithrix kochi Schein, 1959
- Lepithrix kulzeri Schein, 1959
- Lepithrix lebisi Schein, 1959
- Lepithrix lineata (Fabricius, 1775)
- Lepithrix longitarsis Schein, 1959
- Lepithrix luteolineata Dombrow, 2007
- Lepithrix luteomarginata Dombrow, 2001
- Lepithrix namaqua Péringuey, 1902
- Lepithrix nigrosetosus Dombrow, 2007
- Lepithrix nikolaji Dombrow, 2007
- Lepithrix ornatella Péringuey, 1902
- Lepithrix paraknersvlaktensis Dombrow, 2007
- Lepithrix pickeri Dombrow, 2007
- Lepithrix propygidialis Schein, 1959
- Lepithrix pseudogentilis Schein, 1959
- Lepithrix robertsoni Dombrow, 2007
- Lepithrix sarrisamensis Dombrow, 2005
- Lepithrix steineri Dombrow, 2000
- Lepithrix stigma (DeGeer, 1778)
- Lepithrix strigatus Dombrow, 2007
- Lepithrix vredendalensis Dombrow, 2007
- Lepithrix xanthoptera (Burmeister, 1844)

== Fossil species ==
- †Lepithrix germanica (Heer, 1862) (described as Lepitrix germanica from Germany)
