= Lepithrix pseudogentilis =

Scientific classification
- Kingdom: Animalia
- Phylum: Arthropoda
- Clade: Pancrustacea
- Class: Insecta
- Order: Coleoptera
- Suborder: Polyphaga
- Infraorder: Scarabaeiformia
- Family: Scarabaeidae
- Genus: Lepithrix
- Species: L. pseudogentilis

Binomial name
- Lepithrix pseudogentilis Schein, 1959

Species of beetle

Lepithrix pseudogentilis is a species of beetle of the family Scarabaeidae. It is found in South Africa (Western Cape).

== Description ==
Adults reach a length of about 6–7 mm (0.24–0.28 in). They are black with reddish-brown elytra and legs. The pronotum has a yellow border and two disc-shaped spots. The scutellum has yellow scales and the suture and marginal bands of the elytra are also yellow. The pygidial part and abdomen are densely yellowish-scaled and the underside has yellowish-white hairs.
