= Lepithrix kulzeri =

Scientific classification
- Kingdom: Animalia
- Phylum: Arthropoda
- Clade: Pancrustacea
- Class: Insecta
- Order: Coleoptera
- Suborder: Polyphaga
- Infraorder: Scarabaeiformia
- Family: Scarabaeidae
- Genus: Lepithrix
- Species: L. kulzeri

Binomial name
- Lepithrix kulzeri Schein, 1959

Synonyms
- Lepithrix freyi Schein, 1959

Species of beetle

Lepithrix kulzeri is a species of beetle of the family Scarabaeidae. It is found in South Africa (Western Cape).

== Description ==
Adults reach a length of about 7–8 mm (0.28–0.31 in). They are black with pale dark brown elytra with black edges laterally and posteriorly. They are scaleless and the pygidial part and underside have blackish hairs. The forelegs are reddish-brown, while the middle and hind legs are black.
