= Peritrichia abdominalis =

Scientific classification
- Kingdom: Animalia
- Phylum: Arthropoda
- Class: Insecta
- Order: Coleoptera
- Suborder: Polyphaga
- Infraorder: Scarabaeiformia
- Family: Scarabaeidae
- Genus: Peritrichia
- Species: P. abdominalis

Binomial name
- Peritrichia abdominalis (Blanchard, 1850)

Synonyms
- Pherocoma abdominalis Blanchard, 1850

Species of beetle

Peritrichia abdominalis is a species of beetle of the family Scarabaeidae. It is found in South Africa (Western Cape).

== Description ==
Adults reach a length of about 9.5–10 mm (0.37–0.39 in). They are black, with the anterior tibiae and the tarsi reddish. The head and pronotum are clothed with dense, black hairs. The elytra are black, but occasionally piceous-brown laterally, not scaly in males, but in females generally with a narrow basal band of slightly flavescent scales on the pronotum, and on each side of the elytra ill-defined longitudinal bands of similar scales in the two dorsal and the supra-marginal intervals. The elytra are closely punctate and clothed with black hairs which are dense in the basal part but shorter, less dense and somewhat seriate in the posterior, while those along the suture are more closely set and more bristly.
