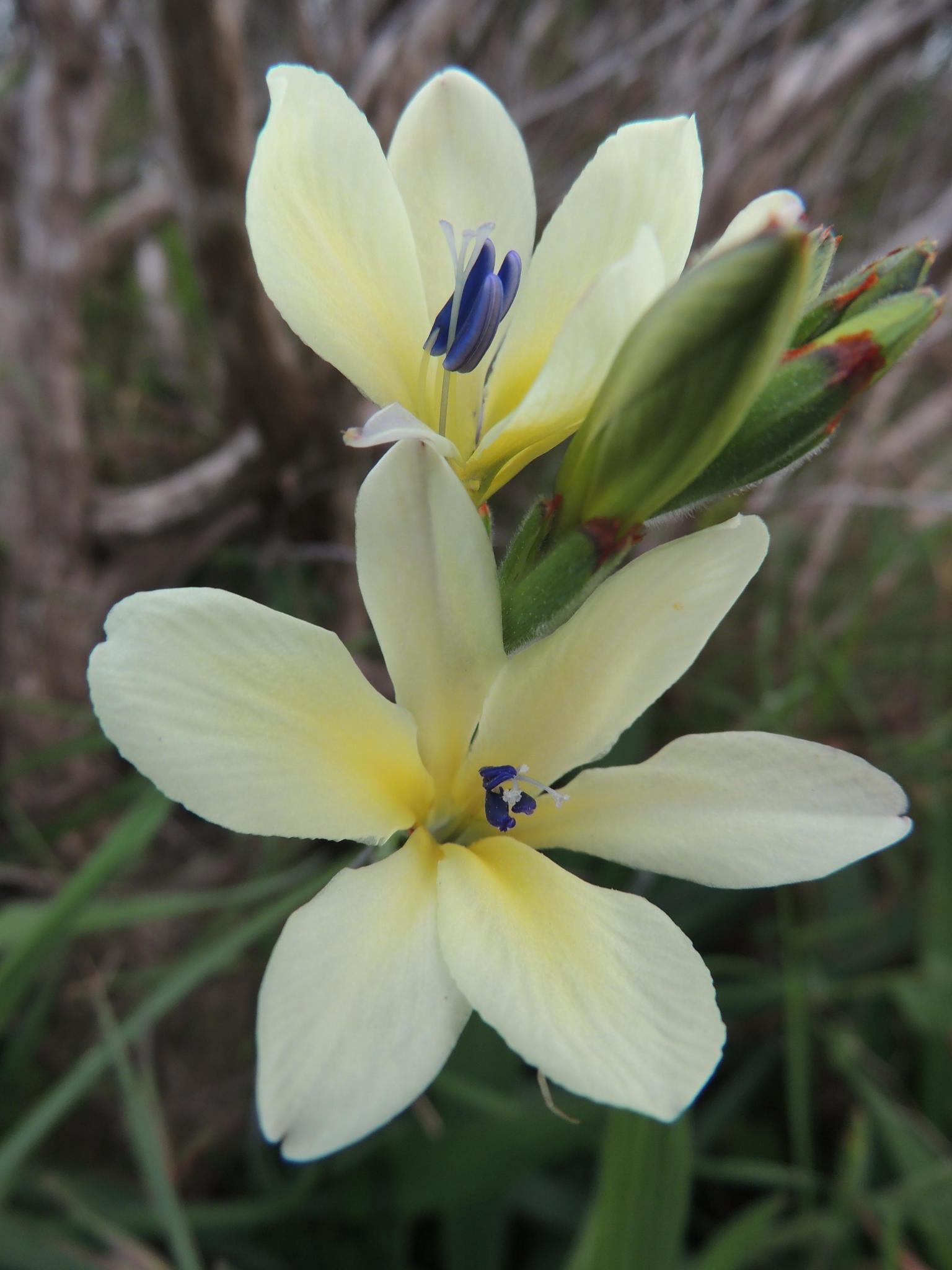

Scientific classification
- Kingdom: Plantae
- Clade: Tracheophytes
- Clade: Angiosperms
- Clade: Monocots
- Order: Asparagales
- Family: Iridaceae
- Genus: Babiana
- Species: B. nervosa

Binomial name
- Babiana nervosa (Lam.) Goldblatt & J.C.Manning

Synonyms
- Babiana caesia Eckl.; Babiana erectifolia G.J.Lewis; Babiana flavocaesia Eckl.; Babiana stricta (Aiton) Ker Gawl.; Babiana stricta var. erectifolia G.J.Lewis; Gladiolus nervosus Lam.; Gladiolus ringens Thunb.; Gladiolus strictus Aiton; Gladiolus villosus Vahl; Ixia scillaris Mill.

= Babiana nervosa =

Species of flowering plant

Babiana nervosa is a perennial flowering plant and geophyte belonging to the genus Babiana. The species is endemic to the Western Cape.
