= Peritrichia guttata =

Scientific classification
- Kingdom: Animalia
- Phylum: Arthropoda
- Clade: Pancrustacea
- Class: Insecta
- Order: Coleoptera
- Suborder: Polyphaga
- Infraorder: Scarabaeiformia
- Family: Scarabaeidae
- Genus: Peritrichia
- Species: P. guttata

Binomial name
- Peritrichia guttata (Burmeister, 1844)

Synonyms
- Anisonyx guttatus Burmeister, 1844

Species of beetle

Peritrichia guttata is a species of beetle of the family Scarabaeidae. It is found in South Africa (Northern Cape).

== Description ==
Adults reach a length of about 7.5 mm (0.30 in). They are similar to Peritrichia saga, but the elytra are a little shorter, and a little broader in proportion. The hairs on the head and pronotum are similar, but the latter part has a very narrow marginal border of scales along the base, and now and then a few scattered about on the discoidal part, but at the anterior angle, and also in the median part of the outer margin there is always a small, but distinct patch. The scales are white in males and yellow in females. The propygidium, pygidium and abdomen are entirely covered with scales in both sexes. The elytra are chestnut-brown and infuscate laterally in males, redder and less infuscate on the sides in females.
