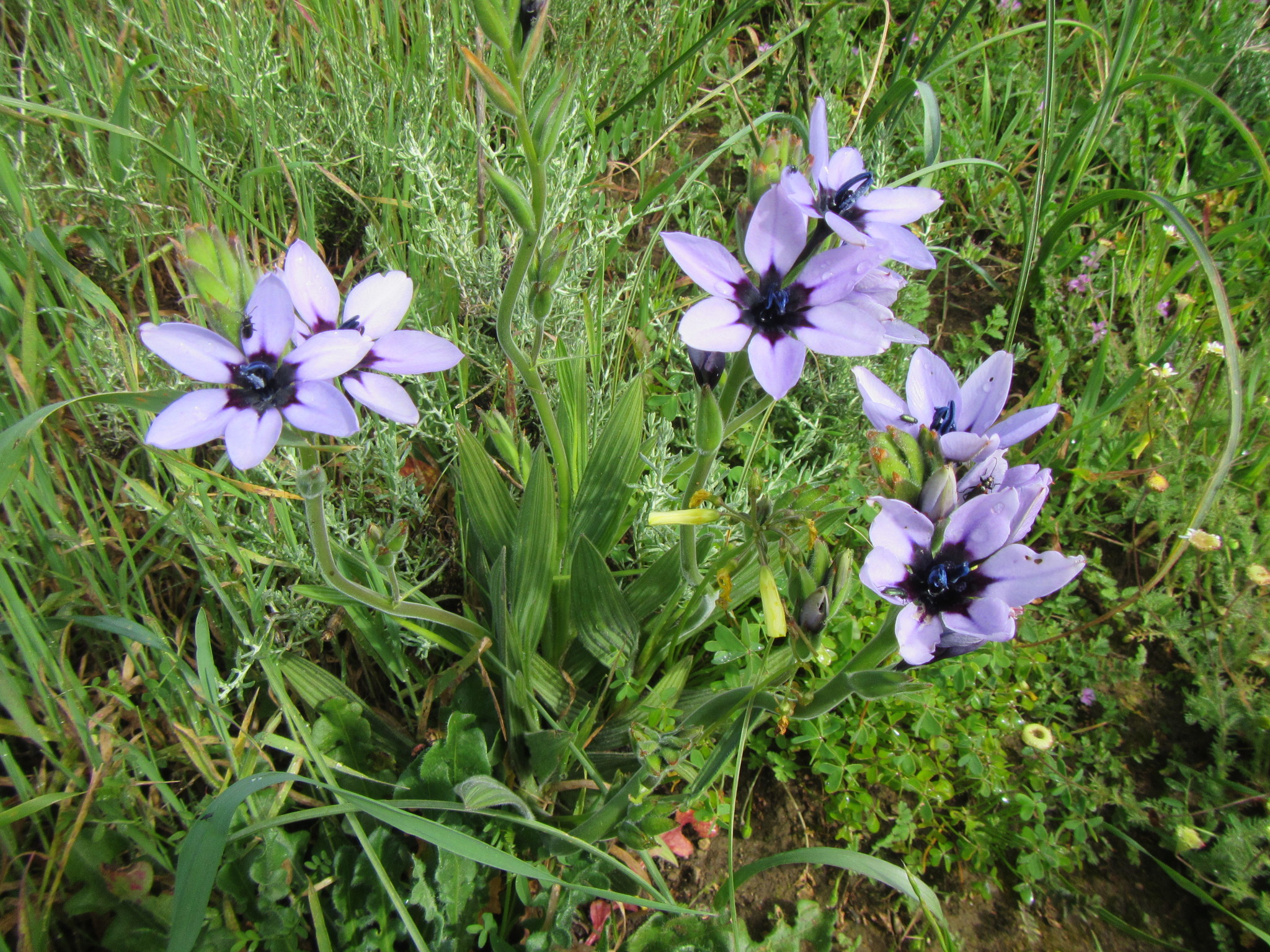

Scientific classification
- Kingdom: Plantae
- Clade: Tracheophytes
- Clade: Angiosperms
- Clade: Monocots
- Order: Asparagales
- Family: Iridaceae
- Genus: Babiana
- Species: B. melanops

Binomial name
- Babiana melanops Goldblatt & J.C.Manning

= Babiana melanops =

Species of flowering plant

Babiana melanops is a species of geophytic, perennial flowering plant in the family Iridaceae. The species is endemic to the Western Cape and occurs from Darling to Mamre and the Tulbagh Valley. It is part of the fynbos and renosterveld. It has an area of occurrence of 5400 km^{2} and there are up to ten subpopulations. The plant has already lost more than 70% of its habitat to crop cultivation. The remaining subpopulations are threatened by invasive plants, quarrying, too many fires and the absence of specialist insects that need to carry out the fertilization.
