= Lepithrix namaqua =

Scientific classification
- Kingdom: Animalia
- Phylum: Arthropoda
- Clade: Pancrustacea
- Class: Insecta
- Order: Coleoptera
- Suborder: Polyphaga
- Infraorder: Scarabaeiformia
- Family: Scarabaeidae
- Genus: Lepithrix
- Species: L. namaqua

Binomial name
- Lepithrix namaqua Péringuey, 1902

Species of beetle

Lepithrix namaqua is a species of beetle of the family Scarabaeidae. It is found in South Africa (Northern Cape).

== Description ==
Adults reach a length of about 8–8.5 mm (0.31–0.33 in). The pronotum is black, with fine, whitish hairs at the base on the disc, and longer, blackish hairs in between, and with short hairs on the sides. These hairs are orange in males and lighter in females. The elytra are light reddish-brown, without scales, but with fine, short, light hairs at the apex. The pygidial part and abdomen are yellow in males and densely whitish scaled in females.
