= Lepithrix lebisi =

Scientific classification
- Kingdom: Animalia
- Phylum: Arthropoda
- Clade: Pancrustacea
- Class: Insecta
- Order: Coleoptera
- Suborder: Polyphaga
- Infraorder: Scarabaeiformia
- Family: Scarabaeidae
- Genus: Lepithrix
- Species: L. lebisi

Binomial name
- Lepithrix lebisi Schein, 1959

Species of beetle

Lepithrix lebisi is a species of beetle of the family Scarabaeidae. It is found in South Africa (Western Cape).

== Description ==
Adults reach a length of about 7 mm (0.28 in). They are black. The pronotum is laterally and posteriorly edged in yellow and has two yellow disc-shaped spots. The elytra are reddish-brown with black hairs and have a narrow band of yellow scales along the suture. The legs are entirely black legs.
