= Peritrichia nitidipennis =

Scientific classification
- Kingdom: Animalia
- Phylum: Arthropoda
- Class: Insecta
- Order: Coleoptera
- Suborder: Polyphaga
- Infraorder: Scarabaeiformia
- Family: Scarabaeidae
- Genus: Peritrichia
- Species: P. nitidipennis

Binomial name
- Peritrichia nitidipennis Blanchard, 1850

Synonyms
- Peritrichia tulbaghina Péringuey, 1902

Species of beetle

Peritrichia nitidipennis is a species of beetle of the family Scarabaeidae. It is found in South Africa (Western Cape).

== Description ==
Adults reach a length of about 7.5–8.25 mm (0.295–0.325 in). They are black, with the elytra reddish brown or flavescent. The head and pronotum are clothed with very long flavous or yellow hairs, mixed with occasional black ones, but with the latter less numerous. The scutellum is covered with very long yellow or flavescent hairs, mixed also with a fewer dark ones.

== Subspecies ==
- Peritrichia nitidipennis nitidipennis (Western Cape)
- Peritrichia nitidipennis transiens Schein, 1959 (Western Cape)
- Peritrichia nitidipennis tulbaghina Péringuey, 1902 (Western Cape)
