= Lepithrix ornatella =

Scientific classification
- Kingdom: Animalia
- Phylum: Arthropoda
- Class: Insecta
- Order: Coleoptera
- Suborder: Polyphaga
- Infraorder: Scarabaeiformia
- Family: Scarabaeidae
- Genus: Lepithrix
- Species: L. ornatella

Binomial name
- Lepithrix ornatella Péringuey, 1902

Synonyms
- Lepithrix ornatellus

Species of beetle

Lepithrix ornatella is a species of beetle of the family Scarabaeidae. It is found in South Africa (Western Cape).

== Description ==
Adults reach a length of about 8–9 mm (0.31–0.35 in). They are black, with the pronotum distinctly margined all round with scales and squamose bright yellow hairs, and having two more or less distinct patches of the same colour in the discoidal part. The elytra have a sutural band of yellow scales beginning at a short distance from the base, rounding the apical part, and ascending above the lateral margin in a band which is distinct for half the length, then obliterated, but there are still a few scales near the humeral angle, situated in the same line. The outer margin has a very narrow, partly obliterated band of similar scales. The pygidium is clothed with yellow scales and bristly black hairs.
