= Peritrichia saga =

Scientific classification
- Kingdom: Animalia
- Phylum: Arthropoda
- Class: Insecta
- Order: Coleoptera
- Suborder: Polyphaga
- Infraorder: Scarabaeiformia
- Family: Scarabaeidae
- Genus: Peritrichia
- Species: P. saga

Binomial name
- Peritrichia saga Péringuey, 1902

Species of beetle

Peritrichia saga is a species of beetle of the family Scarabaeidae. It is found in South Africa (Western Cape).

== Description ==
Adults reach a length of about 7.5–10 mm (0.30–0.39 in). They are black, with the elytra light chestnut-brown, turning sometimes to piceous. The pronotum has a narrow band of flavescent scales on the anterior and posterior margins, the latter more distinct, but often nearly obliterated in males, in the centre of the disk are two small patches of scales often also obliterated in males, and on the elytra, of which the humeral longitudinal costa is very distinct, there is a sub-basal transverse row of three, and a post-median of two moderately large patches of flavescent scales, and the apical part is edged with a narrow band which occasionally coalesces along the hind part of the suture with the inner of these patches. The hairs on the head and pronotum are long and black.
