= Babiana avicularis =

Scientific classification
- Kingdom: Plantae
- Clade: Tracheophytes
- Clade: Angiosperms
- Clade: Monocots
- Order: Asparagales
- Family: Iridaceae
- Genus: Babiana
- Species: B. avicularis

Binomial name
- Babiana avicularis Goldblatt & J.C.Manning

Species of flowering plant

Babiana avicularis is a geophytic, perennial flowering plant in the family Iridaceae. It is part of the Leipoldtville fynbos and Langebaan strandveld vegetation. The species is endemic to the Western Cape. It occurs on the coastal plain between Elands Bay and Clanwilliam and has an area of 199 km^{2}. There are four subpopulations and the species is threatened by the planting of potatoes.
