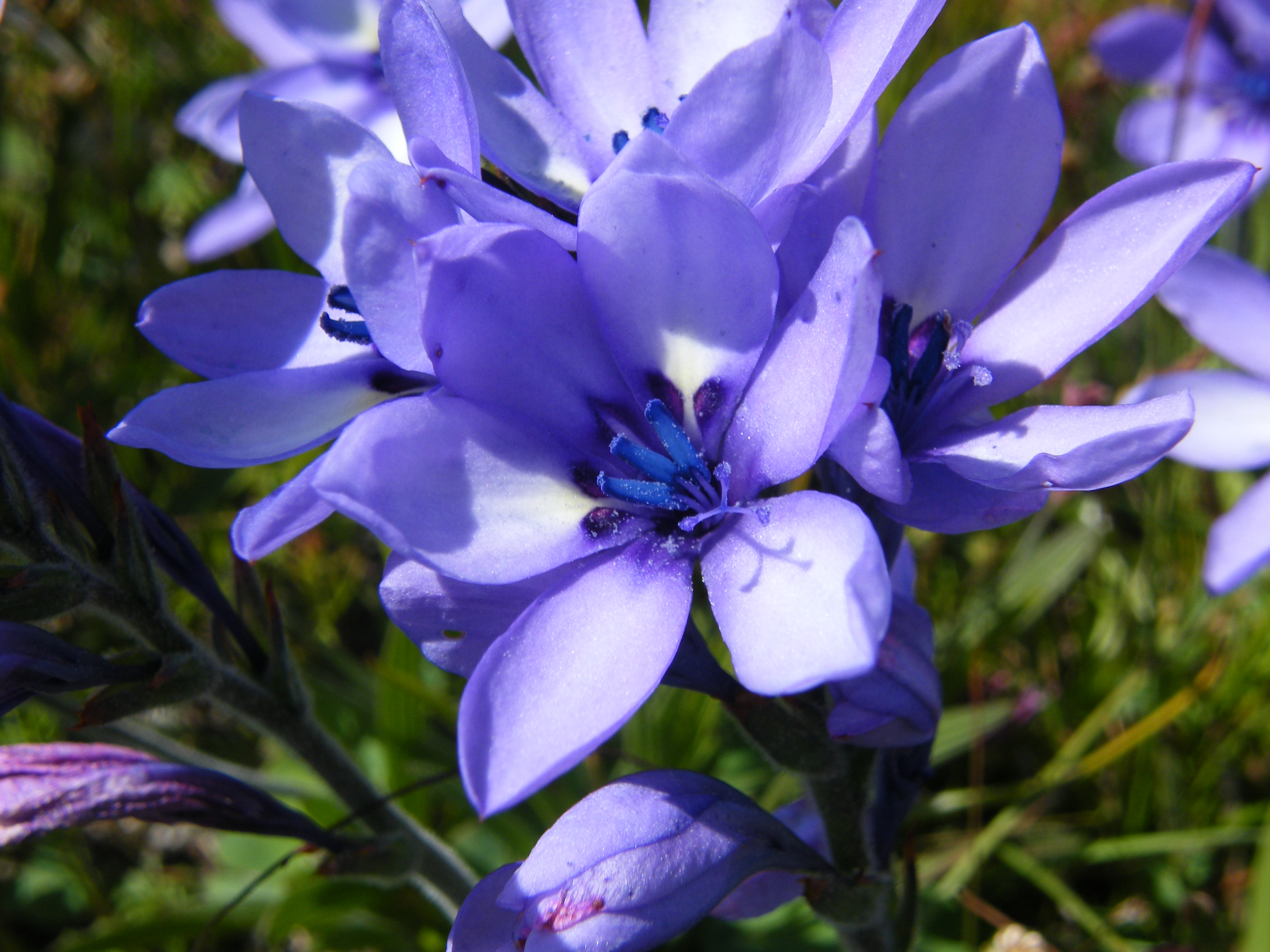

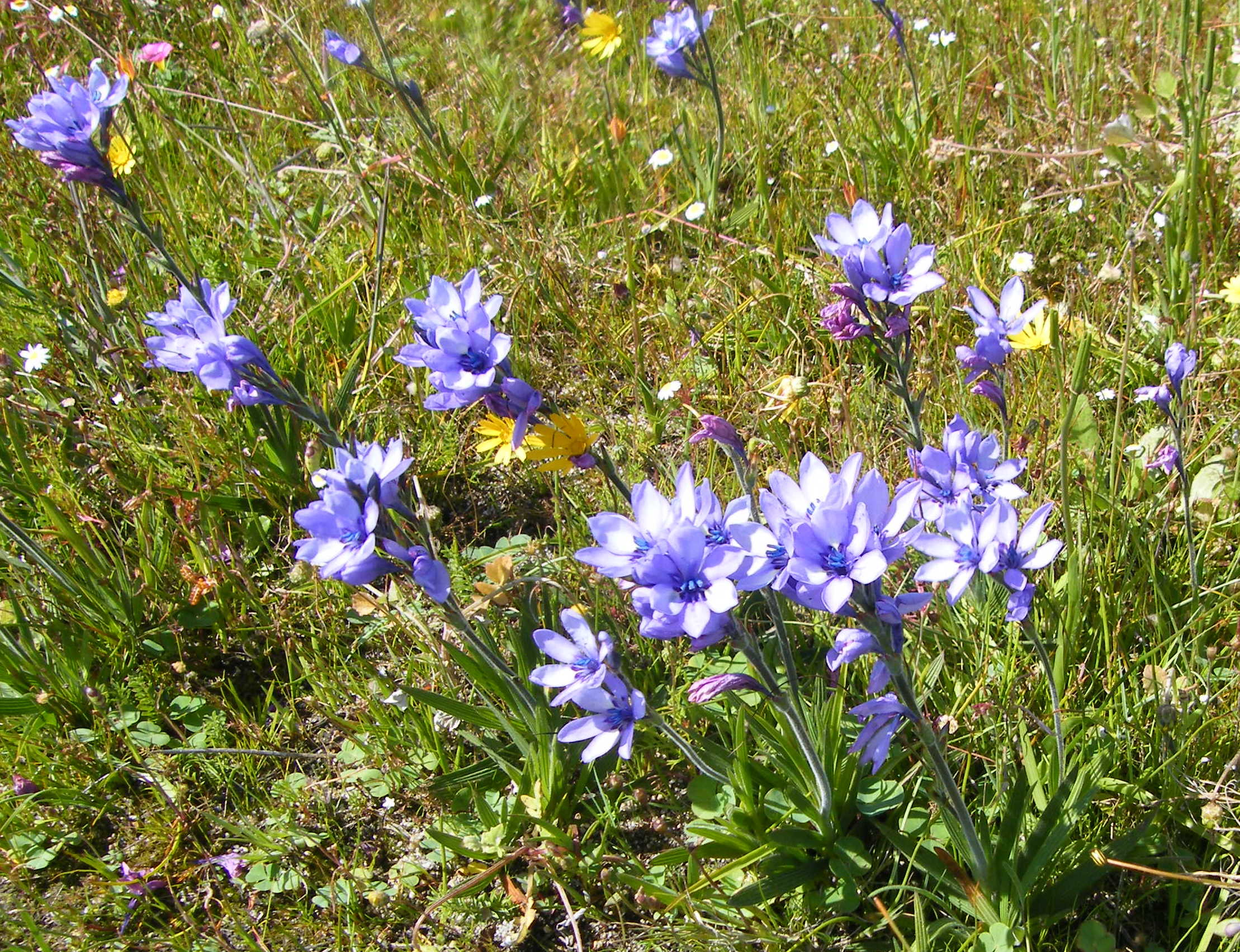

Scientific classification
- Kingdom: Plantae
- Clade: Tracheophytes
- Clade: Angiosperms
- Clade: Monocots
- Order: Asparagales
- Family: Iridaceae
- Genus: Babiana
- Species: B. fragrans

Binomial name
- Babiana fragrans (Jacq.) Steud.

Synonyms
- Babiana disticha Ker Gawl.; Babiana lilacina Eckl.; Babiana plicata Ker Gawl.; Babiana punctata Klatt; Babiana reflexa (Licht. ex Roem. & Schult.) Ker Gawl.; Gladiolus distichus (Ker Gawl.) Roem. & Schult.; Gladiolus fragrans Jacq.; Gladiolus plicatus Thunb.; Gladiolus plicatus Jacq.; Gladiolus reflexus Licht. ex Roem. & Schult.

= Babiana fragrans =

Species of flowering plant

Babiana fragrans is a perennial flowering plant and geophyte belonging to the genus Babiana. The species is endemic to the Western Cape. The species was named after Henry Georges Fourcade. It occurs from the Cape Peninsula to Malmesbury and Ceres and has a range of 6800 km². The plant has lost much of its habitat (65%) in the low-lying areas between Stellenbosch, Paarl and Cape Town and in the Ceres Valley to development, agricultural activities and invasive species. The threats continue.
