= Peritrichia ditissima =

Scientific classification
- Kingdom: Animalia
- Phylum: Arthropoda
- Class: Insecta
- Order: Coleoptera
- Suborder: Polyphaga
- Infraorder: Scarabaeiformia
- Family: Scarabaeidae
- Genus: Peritrichia
- Species: P. ditissima

Binomial name
- Peritrichia ditissima Péringuey, 1902

Species of beetle

Peritrichia ditissima is a species of beetle of the family Scarabaeidae. It is found in Namibia.

== Description ==
Adults reach a length of about 6–7.5 mm (0.24–0.30 in). They are black, with the elytra chestnut-brown or chestnut-red. The head and pronotum are very briefly pubescent, the latter in the male has a broad basal band of deep orange-yellow scales, a narrower lateral and apical one of flavescent scales and in the discoidal part an arcuate one reaching on each side from near the median part of the base to the median part of the outer margin. The scutellum is densely scaly. The elytra are clothed with non-contiguous, squamiform sub-flavescent hairs, and have five somewhat broad, saffron-yellow scaly patches on each side. The apical part has a band of similar scales which ascend the posterior part of the suture and coalesce sometimes with the inner, lower dorsal patches. In females, the bands of scales on the pronotum are similar but narrower, and white, the patches on the elytra are smaller and have a greater tendency to form two bands. The propygidium, pygidium and abdomen are entirely clothed with scales, which are saffron-yellow in males and white in females.
