= Peritrichia ursus =

Scientific classification
- Kingdom: Animalia
- Phylum: Arthropoda
- Clade: Pancrustacea
- Class: Insecta
- Order: Coleoptera
- Suborder: Polyphaga
- Infraorder: Scarabaeiformia
- Family: Scarabaeidae
- Genus: Peritrichia
- Species: P. ursus

Binomial name
- Peritrichia ursus (Olivier, 1789)

Synonyms
- Melolontha ursus Olivier, 1789 (nec. Fabricius, 1775)

Species of beetle

Peritrichia ursus is a species of beetle of the family Scarabaeidae. It is found in South Africa (Western Cape).

== Description ==
Adults reach a length of about 9–10 mm (0.35–0.39 in). They are black, with the elytra (hardened wing covers) are dark brownish red, or chocolate-brown in colour. The front plate (clypeus) narrows to a sharp point and ends in a small notch or two tooth-like tips.The head and pronotum (front part of the thorax) are clothed with very long hairs. These are mostly black but mixed occasionally with a few greyish ones occurring along the sides in both sexes. There is no trace of scales. The elytra are clothed with moderately short, black hairs, which are longer and denser along the suture. The scutellum (the small plate between the wing covers), is long and pointed, and is also covered with soft hairs. The wing covers taper inward from the shoulders toward the tip, so that at the end they are only about half as wide as at the base, and the humeral costa (a ridge running across the shoulder region) is distinct and covered witrh short black hairs which become longer and thicker along the line where the two wing covers meet. The underside of the body, as well as the thighs and shins of the legs (except for the front pair), are also very densely covered with hair. The legs are dark reddish-brown, while the hind shins are black.

In both sexes, the abdomen is thickly covered with soft, grayish-white hairs. There is little difference between males and females. However, in males, the scutellum is covered with long black hairs and in females these hairs are grayish, additionally, the female's hind shins are slightly less densely covered with hair than the male's, and the hairs there tend to be more gray in color.

== Habitat ==
Cape Colony (Cape Town, Stellenbosch, Tulbagh, Paarl).
