= Peritrichia dimidiata =

Scientific classification
- Kingdom: Animalia
- Phylum: Arthropoda
- Class: Insecta
- Order: Coleoptera
- Suborder: Polyphaga
- Infraorder: Scarabaeiformia
- Family: Scarabaeidae
- Genus: Peritrichia
- Species: P. dimidiata

Binomial name
- Peritrichia dimidiata Burmeister, 1844

Synonyms
- Peritrichia peringueyi Dalla Torre, 1913

Species of beetle

Peritrichia dimidiata is a species of beetle of the family Scarabaeidae. It is found in South Africa (Western Cape).

== Description ==
Adults reach a length of about 6–8.5 mm (0.24–0.33 in). They are black, with the elytra slightly testaceous and very broadly infuscate laterally in both sexes. The head and pronotum are clothed with very long, greyish and black hairs, quite white, however, along the margin of the pronotum, and without any trace of scales. The elytra are clothed with hairs as long as on the pronotum, but with the greyish white ones more numerous, and they have a marginal band of small white scales, which cannot be said to be dense, along the outer margin, and forming a more distinct band along the apical part, and sometimes ascending along the posterior part of the suture. The pygidium is clothed with long black hairs and squamose ones in males.

== Taxonomy ==
In his Descriptive catalogue of the Coleoptera of South Africa, Péringuey did not list Peritrichia dimidiata as described by Burmeister in 1844. He did however describe the same species again, and also named it dimidiata. In 1913, Dallatorre renamed Peringuey's dimidiata to peringueyi, but did not actually examine both types. In 1959, Shein compared both types and concluded they represent the same species.
