= Peritrichia pistrinaria =

Scientific classification
- Kingdom: Animalia
- Phylum: Arthropoda
- Class: Insecta
- Order: Coleoptera
- Suborder: Polyphaga
- Infraorder: Scarabaeiformia
- Family: Scarabaeidae
- Genus: Peritrichia
- Species: P. pistrinaria

Binomial name
- Peritrichia pistrinaria (Péringuey, 1888)

Synonyms
- Lepitrix pistrinarius Péringuey, 1888; Peritrichia pistrinarius

Species of beetle

Peritrichia pistrinaria is a species of beetle of the family Scarabaeidae. It is found in South Africa (Northern Cape).

== Description ==
Adults reach a length of about 8–9.5 mm (0.31–0.37 in). They are totally black, but with the elytra of the females fulvous, or occasionally reddish brown. The head is clothed with greyish hairs in males and the pronotum is clothed with somewhat short hairs which in the discoidal part are partly black and partly grey, but are white, denser, and lanuginose all around the margins. In the central part of the disk are two distinct but small squamulose white patches. The elytra are covered with non-contiguous, elongate white scales, intermingled with erect or sub-erect, black, somewhat bristly hairs which are longer and stiffer along the suture. In females, the marginal band on the pronotum is more lanuginose laterally and in front, more squamose along the base, and yellowish instead of white. The elytra have a more or less distinct broad band of whitish scales along the outer margins, which also ascends the suture for some distance, and there are a few more scattered on the surface, but not as numerously as in males.
