= Peritrichia plebeja =

Scientific classification
- Kingdom: Animalia
- Phylum: Arthropoda
- Class: Insecta
- Order: Coleoptera
- Suborder: Polyphaga
- Infraorder: Scarabaeiformia
- Family: Scarabaeidae
- Genus: Peritrichia
- Species: P. plebeja

Binomial name
- Peritrichia plebeja Péringuey, 1902

Species of beetle

Peritrichia plebeja is a species of beetle of the family Scarabaeidae. It is found in South Africa (Western Cape).

== Description ==
Adults reach a length of about 8.5–9.5 mm (0.33–0.37 in). They are black, with the anterior and intermediate legs rufescent. The head and pronotum are clothed with long, but not very dense erect black hairs, the latter part shows no trace of scales along the margins, but there are two small median patches of flavescent scales in males. The scutellum has no scales. The elytra are clothed with very short, black hairs, and in males there are four indistinct maculae of flavescent scales on each side, as well as a nearly obliterated narrow, marginal apical band of similar ones. The propygidium and pygidium are scaleless in males, but have a slight fringe of them in females.
