= Lepithrix lineata =

Scientific classification
- Kingdom: Animalia
- Phylum: Arthropoda
- Clade: Pancrustacea
- Class: Insecta
- Order: Coleoptera
- Suborder: Polyphaga
- Infraorder: Scarabaeiformia
- Family: Scarabaeidae
- Genus: Lepithrix
- Species: L. lineata

Binomial name
- Lepithrix lineata (Fabricius, 1775)

Synonyms
- Trichius lineatus Fabricius, 1775; Trichius thoracicus Thunberg, 1818; Scarabaeus quadratus DeGeer, 1778

Species of beetle

Lepithrix lineata is a species of beetle of the family Scarabaeidae. It is found in South Africa (Western Cape).

== Description ==
Adults reach a length of about 9–9.25 mm (0.354–0.364 in). They are black, with the elytra light chestnut. The pronotum has a broad margin all around, consisting of yellow scales, as well as two discoidal lines of similar scales reaching from the base to past the median part. The scutellum has yellow scales in the basal part. The elytra have a band of yellow scales reaching from near the base to the apex, and continued round the apical part. The propygidium and pygidium are densely scaly. The scales are yellow, but turn to white on the abdomen, which is also clothed with white hairs. The legs and antennae are rufescent. The colour of the scales is deeper yellow in males than in females.
