= Peritrichia tristis =

Scientific classification
- Kingdom: Animalia
- Phylum: Arthropoda
- Class: Insecta
- Order: Coleoptera
- Suborder: Polyphaga
- Infraorder: Scarabaeiformia
- Family: Scarabaeidae
- Genus: Peritrichia
- Species: P. tristis

Binomial name
- Peritrichia tristis (Burmeister, 1844)

Synonyms
- Anisonyx tristis Burmeister, 1844; Peritrichia (Pherocoma) grata Péringuey, 1902

Species of beetle

Peritrichia tristis is a species of beetle of the family Scarabaeidae. It is found in South Africa (Western Cape).

== Description ==
Adults reach a length of about 8.5–9 mm (0.33–0.35 in). They are black, with the elytra testaceous-red or light testaceous. There is no trace of scales except on the two basal segments of the abdomen, which are clothed with whitish ones. The clypeus is clothed, like the pronotum, with long, dense, black hairs. The elytra are covered with short, not very dense black hairs, and have seriate, erect, bristly hairs (which are more abundant in the basal part, and nearly as long, but not so densely set as those along the suture.
