= Peritrichia capicola =

Scientific classification
- Kingdom: Animalia
- Phylum: Arthropoda
- Class: Insecta
- Order: Coleoptera
- Suborder: Polyphaga
- Infraorder: Scarabaeiformia
- Family: Scarabaeidae
- Genus: Peritrichia
- Species: P. capicola

Binomial name
- Peritrichia capicola (Fabricius, 1801)

Synonyms
- Melolontha capicola Fabricius, 1801 (not Fabricius, 1781); Peritrichia distincta Blanchard, 1850; Trichius hirtus Fabricius, 1798; Trichius pilosus Fabricius, 1798

Species of beetle

Peritrichia capicola is a species of beetle of the family Scarabaeidae. It is found in South Africa (Western Cape).

== Description ==
Adults reach a length of about 7.5–9.5 mm (0.30–0.37 in). They are black, with the elytra testaceous red, broadly margined with black outwardly and along the suture in males, redder and not infuscate in females. There is a narrow band of short, sub-squamose hairs along the margins of the pronotum, and as often as not there are two minute patches of similar hairs on the disk. The elytra are clothed with long greyish and black hairs, the former pre-dominating in males, and flavescent in females.
