= Bulbine caput-medusae =

Conservation status
- Least Concern (IUCN 3.1)

Scientific classification
- Kingdom: Plantae
- Clade: Tracheophytes
- Clade: Angiosperms
- Clade: Monocots
- Order: Asparagales
- Family: Asphodelaceae
- Subfamily: Asphodeloideae
- Genus: Bulbine
- Species: B. caput-medusae

Binomial name
- Bulbine caput-medusae G.Will.

Species of flowering plant

Bulbine caput-medusae is a species of plant in the Asphodelaceae family. It is endemic to Namibia. Its natural habitats are dry savanna and hot deserts.
