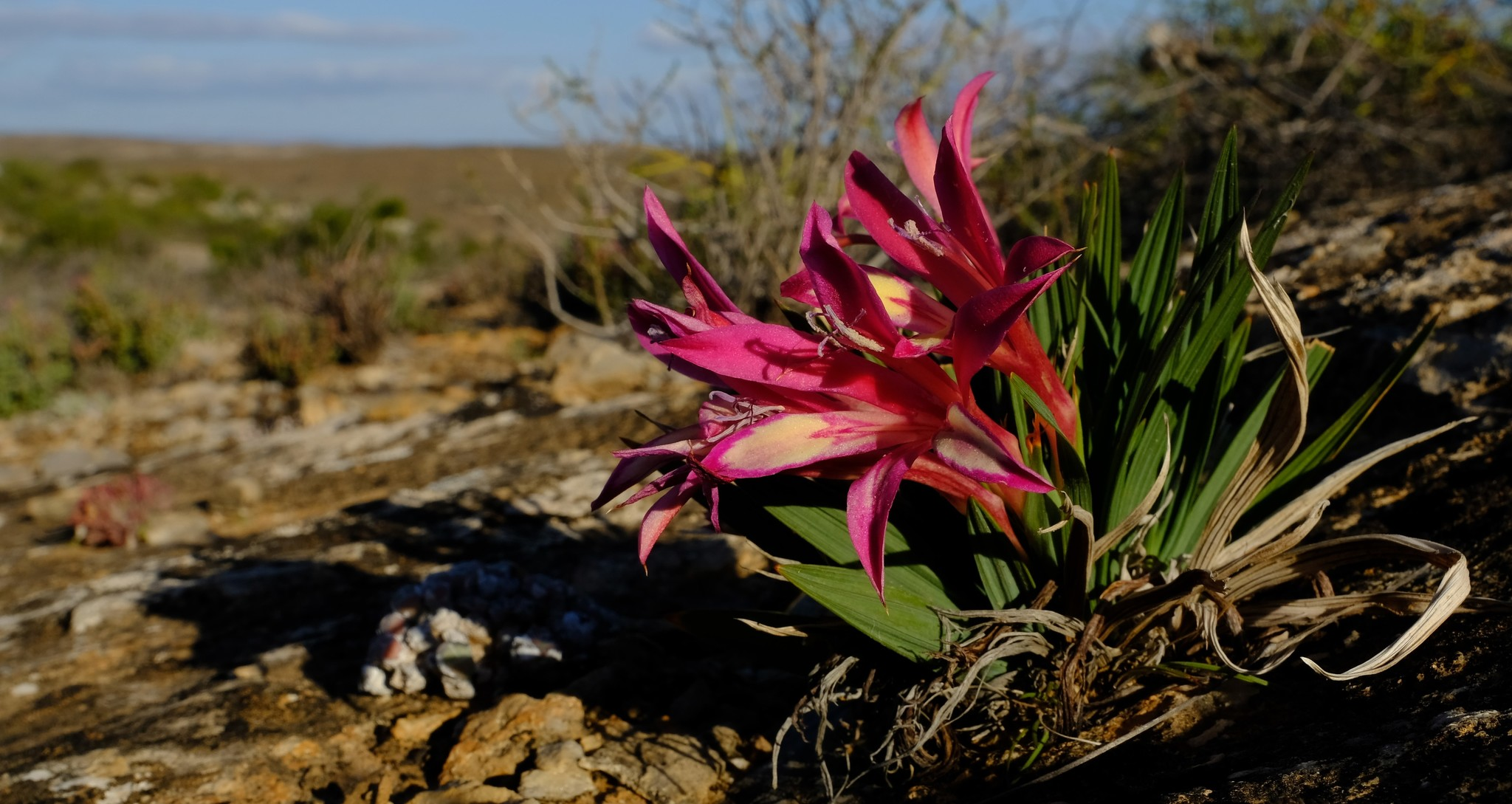

Scientific classification
- Kingdom: Plantae
- Clade: Embryophytes
- Clade: Tracheophytes
- Clade: Spermatophytes
- Clade: Angiosperms
- Clade: Monocots
- Order: Asparagales
- Family: Iridaceae
- Genus: Babiana
- Species: B. carminea

Binomial name
- Babiana carminea J.C.Manning & Goldblatt

= Babiana carminea =

Species of flowering plant

Babiana carminea is a geophytic, perennial flowering plant in the family Iridaceae. It is part of the vygieveld. The species is endemic to the Western Cape province of South Africa.

== Description ==
Babiana carminea is a perennial geophyte of 5–10 cm (2.0–3.9 in) high including its leaves with a unbranched stem that only extends a little above the surface, and is surrounded by a short collar of coarse fibres. The more or less upright, finely hairy, shallowly pleated, narrowly lance-shaped leaves are up to 10 cm (3.9 in) long. Below every flower are two pale-green, finely hairy bracts of 4–5 cm (1.6–2.0 in) long with dry beige tips. The inner bract is somewhat longer than the outer and forked at the tip. The unscented carmine-coloured mirror-symmetrical flowers with creamy-yellow spear-shaped blotches on the outer tepals are set with 2-5 in a horizontal spike. The perianth tube, where the tepals are merged is somewhat bent, circular in circumference in the lower 3½-4 cm, than suddenly fanning out for 1¾-2 cm. The six tepals are unequal, with the tepal next to the stamens being 40–48 mm (1.6–1.9 in) long and 9–13 mm (0.35–0.51 in) wide, the lower tepals united for an additional 2–4 mm (0.079–0.157 in) and each 3½-4 cm long and about 1 cm wide. The three dark pink filaments are clustered near the longest tepal, somewhat more robust below, about 4 cm long and extending about 2 cm from the perianth tube. The anthers at their tip are about 9 mm long. The ovary is smooth and tipped by a style that divides in 3 branches of about 6 mm long opposite the lower half of the anthers. The capsule is ovoid in shape and 1-1½ cm long. Flowering probably starts in late July and extends to early August.

== Taxonomy ==
This species of bobbejaantjie was first described by John Manning and Peter Goldblatt in 2007 and they gave it its current scientific name, Babiana carminea.

== Distribution and ecology ==
Babiana carminea occurs on the Knersvlakte, near Vanrhynsdorp in the Western Cape province of South Africa where it is limited to limestone outcrops. Its corms are wedged tightly in the crevices. The species grows in a very dry climate with on average less than 100 mm (3.9 in) of rain per year. These crevices however collect surface runoff and together with fog from the sea this improves local water availability. Growing with these plants in the crevices are also Antimima dualis, Bulbine margarethae, Bulbine wiesei, Eriospermum arachnoideum and Ixia acaulis. In the deeper loam or clay soil surrounding the limestone outcrops Moraea deserticola can be found. The shape and colour of the flowers suggest these are pollinated by sunbirds, but the cream-coloured blotches may be a relict due to a recent shift from being pollinated by flies with a long proboscis. There is one population consisting of less than 100 plants and it is threatened by limestone mining activities.
