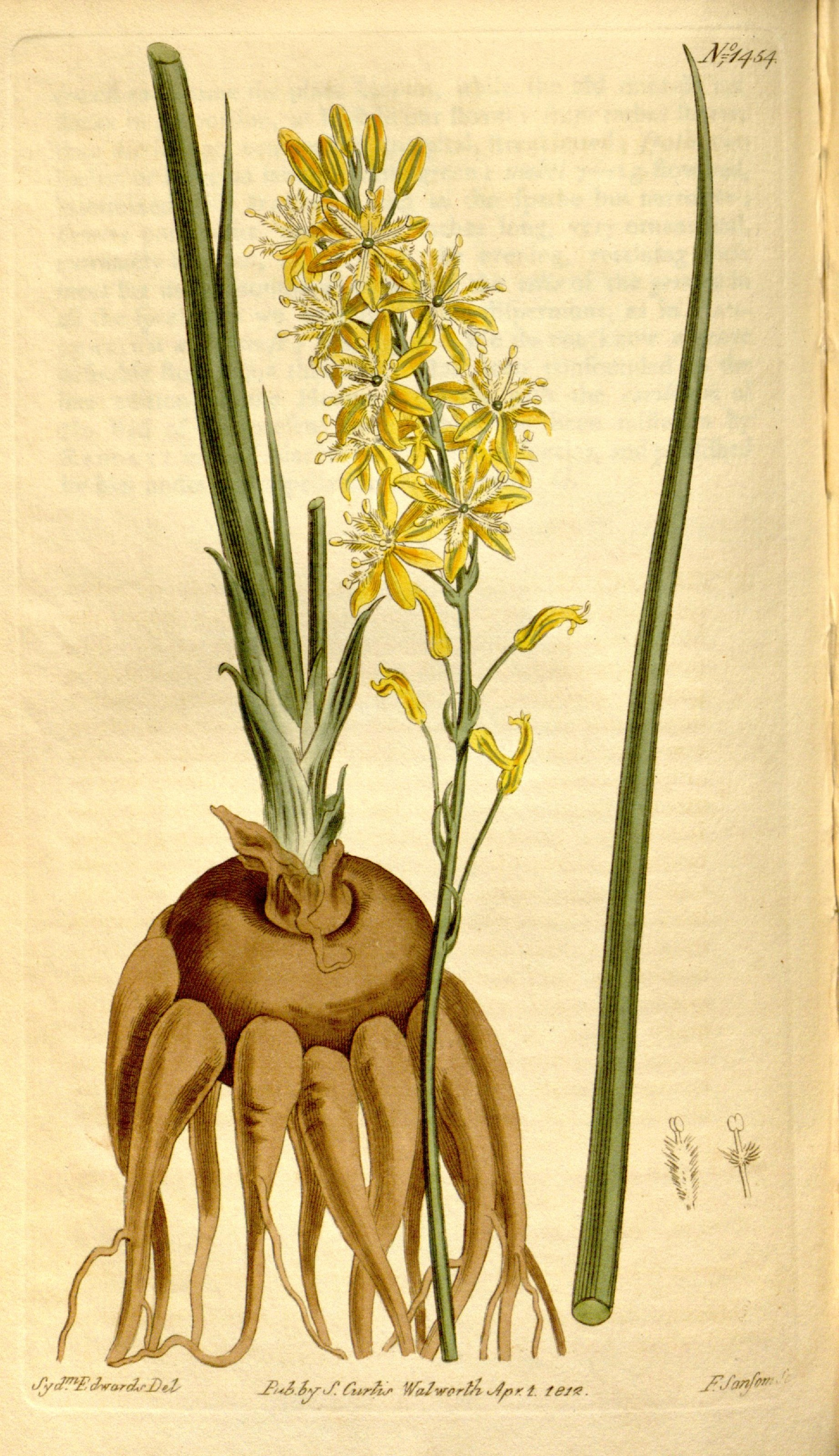

Scientific classification
- Kingdom: Plantae
- Clade: Tracheophytes
- Clade: Angiosperms
- Clade: Monocots
- Order: Asparagales
- Family: Asphodelaceae
- Subfamily: Asphodeloideae
- Genus: Bulbine
- Species: B. cepacea

Binomial name
- Bulbine cepacea (Burm.f.) Wijnands

Synonyms
- Anthericum pugioniforme Jacq.; Bulbine bisulcata Haw.; Bulbine cataphyllata Poelln.; Bulbine inexpectata Poelln.; Bulbine parviflora Baker; Bulbine pugioniformis (Jacq.) Link; Bulbine tuberosa (Mill.) Oberm.; Ornithogalum cepaceum Burm.f.; Ornithogalum tuberosum Mill.; Phalangium bisulcatum (Haw.) Kuntze; Phalangium pugioniforme (Jacq.) Kuntze

= Bulbine cepacea =

Species of flowering plant

Bulbine cepacea is a flowering plant in the genus Bulbine, endemic to the Western Cape province, South Africa.

== Distribution ==
Bulbine cepacea occurs in semi-dry Renosterveld vegetation, as far north as Clanwilliam, south to the Cape Peninsula, and as far east as Riversdale.

== Description ==
This species has a spiral rosette of erect, soft, slender (max.1 cm), succulent, green, linear leaves with acute tips. The leaves are almost rounded (terete) in cross-section, having a flat upper surface and a rounder lower surface.

The leaf base is striated and has a sheath that encloses the stem.

It has a short stem above its large, flattened, disc-shaped subterranean tuber.

This species flowers in autumn.
