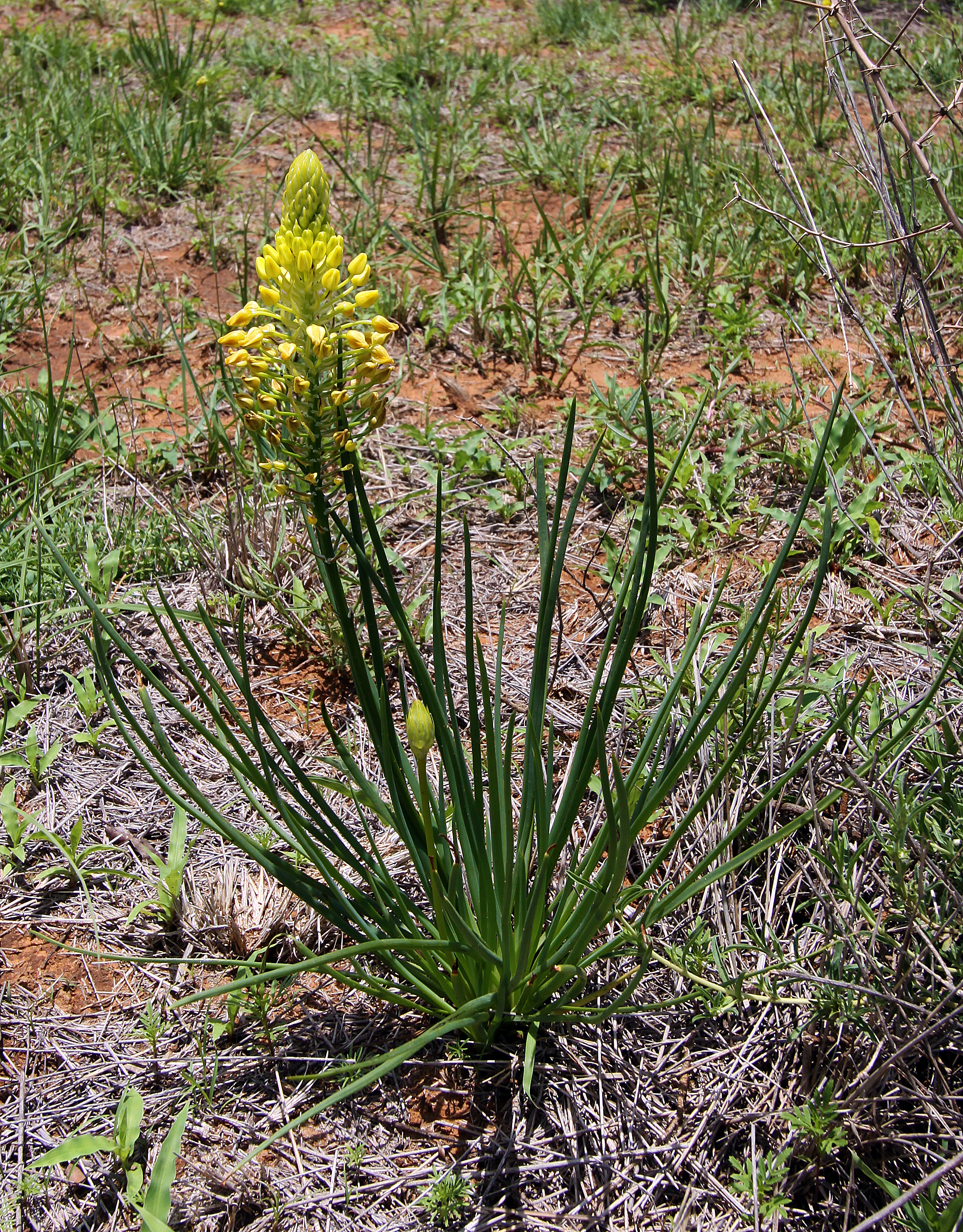

Scientific classification
- Kingdom: Plantae
- Clade: Tracheophytes
- Clade: Angiosperms
- Clade: Monocots
- Order: Asparagales
- Family: Asphodelaceae
- Subfamily: Asphodeloideae
- Genus: Bulbine
- Species: B. abyssinica

Binomial name
- Bulbine abyssinica A.Rich. (1850)

Synonyms
- Bulbine asphodeloides var. filifolioides De Wild. (1909); Bulbine asphodeloides var. monticola Poelln. (1944); Bulbine asphodeloides var. xanthobotrys (Engl. & Gilg) Weim. (1937); Bulbine decurvata Peter ex Poelln. (1944); Bulbine hamata Peter ex Poelln. (1944); Bulbine huilensis Poelln. (1943); Bulbine latitepala Poelln. (1943); Bulbine xanthobotrys Engl. & Gilg (1903)

= Bulbine abyssinica =

Species of flowering plant

Bulbine abyssinica is a species of plant in the genus Bulbine, from eastern and southern Africa.

== Description ==
A small geophyte, with an underground stem, and a tuft of slender leaves that appear in a rosette above the ground. The leaves are slender, succulent and cylindrical (200 mm long; 5 mm broad).

The 50 cm tall inflorescence appears in early Summer, or after rains. The yellow flowers are carried at the top of it. Like all Bulbine species, the stamens are distinctively tufted ("bearded").

== Distribution ==
This species is widespread across southern, central, and eastern Africa, where it grows in rocky soils. It ranges from Yemen and Sudan in the north to Republic of the Congo and Angola in the west and to the Cape Provinces of South Africa in the south. In the south, it grows as far as the town of Worcester, South Africa.
