= Bulbine crassa =

Scientific classification
- Kingdom: Plantae
- Clade: Tracheophytes
- Clade: Angiosperms
- Clade: Monocots
- Order: Asparagales
- Family: Asphodelaceae
- Subfamily: Asphodeloideae
- Genus: Bulbine
- Species: B. crassa

Binomial name
- Bulbine crassa D.I.Morris & Duretto, 2006

Species of flowering plant

Bulbine crassa, the coast lily or Crassa Island leek lily, is a flower described in 2006 which occurs on the Furneaux Group of islands between Victoria and Tasmania. Seeds have been preserved as part of the Tasmanian partnership with the Millennium Seed Bank Project.
