= Bulbine bruynsii =

Conservation status
- Vulnerable (IUCN 3.1)

Scientific classification
- Kingdom: Plantae
- Clade: Tracheophytes
- Clade: Angiosperms
- Clade: Monocots
- Order: Asparagales
- Family: Asphodelaceae
- Subfamily: Asphodeloideae
- Genus: Bulbine
- Species: B. bruynsii

Binomial name
- Bulbine bruynsii S.A.Hammer

Species of flowering plant

Bulbine bruynsii is a species of plant in the genus Bulbine. It is endemic to South Africa.

== Distribution and habitat ==
It occurs in the vicinity of the Knersvlakte in the arid Namaqualand region, in the area between the Western Cape and Northern Cape Provinces, South Africa. Roughly twelve populations are known. Its natural habitat is open saline patches of quartz and clay flats, in "Hardeveld" vegetation.

== Description ==
Each head normally only forms two leaves, which are wrinkled and rugose. It is deciduous and is only visible above ground in the rainy season from June until September. For the rest of the year it is dormant and below the ground.
