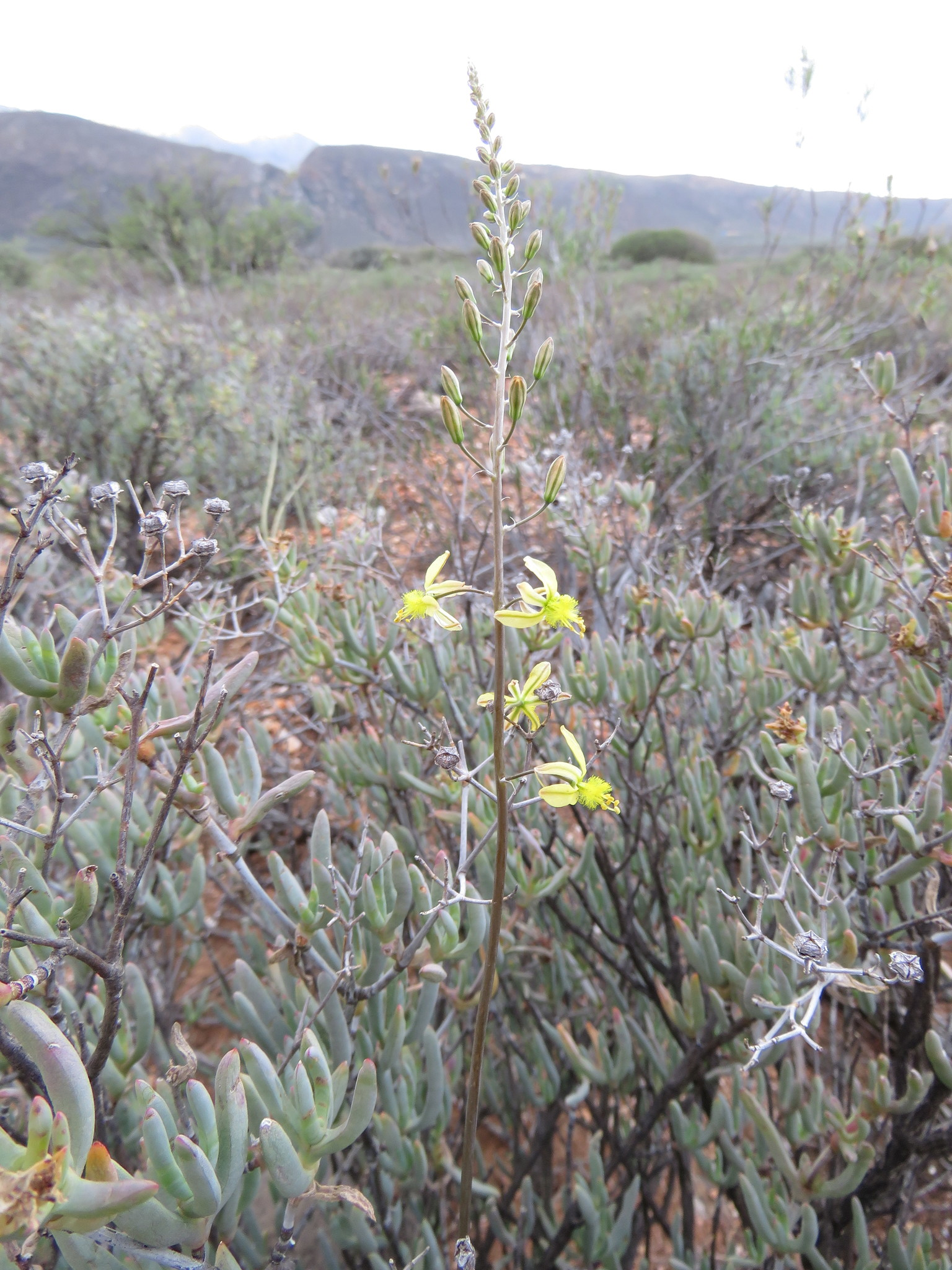
- Bulbine favosa photographed in the Western Cape Province, South Africa

Conservation status
- Least Concern (IUCN 3.1)

Scientific classification
- Kingdom: Plantae
- Clade: Tracheophytes
- Clade: Angiosperms
- Clade: Monocots
- Order: Asparagales
- Family: Asphodelaceae
- Subfamily: Asphodeloideae
- Genus: Bulbine
- Species: B. favosa

Binomial name
- Bulbine favosa (Thunb.) Schult. & Schult.f.

Synonyms
- Anthericum favosum Thunb.; Bulbine dubia Schult. & Schult.f.; Bulbine filifolia Baker; Phalangium favosum (Thunb.) Kuntze; Phalangium filifolium (Baker) Kuntze; Bulbine trichophylla Baker; Bulbine mayori Beauverd; Bulbine rigidula Schltr. ex Poelln.; Bulbine setifera Poelln.

= Bulbine favosa =

Species of plant

Bulbine favosa is a species of tuberous plant in the genus Bulbine. It is native to South Africa and Zimbabwe.

== Distribution and habitat ==
Bulbine favosa is native to South Africa (including the Eastern Cape Province, Gauteng, KwaZulu-Natal, Mpumalanga, the North-West Province, and the Western Cape Province) and Zimbabwe, where it grows in montane grasslands between 30–2,000 m (98–6,562 ft) above sea level. It prefers rocky habitats such as crevices or stony soils.

== Description ==
Bulbine favosa is an acaulescent plant arising from a tuberous rhizome with spongy roots. The leaves, nearly cylindrical in shape and measuring 9–30 cm (3.5–11.8 in) long by 1–2 mm (0.039–0.079 in) wide, arise from the rhizome as a basal rosette. Each plant produces one to three peduncles measuring 5–34 cm (2.0–13.4 in) long and around 2.5 mm (0.098 in) wide, with each peduncle bearing a sparse, 3–18 cm (1.2–7.1 in) long raceme. The transparent white bracts are narrowly egg-shaped with an elongated tip, measuring 3.5 mm (0.14 in) long and 2 mm (0.079 in) wide. The pedicels are up to 13 mm (0.51 in) long. The flowers are yellow, and the fruit is an egg-shaped capsule measuring 3–4 mm (0.12–0.16 in) long and 2–3 mm (0.079–0.118 in) wide.
