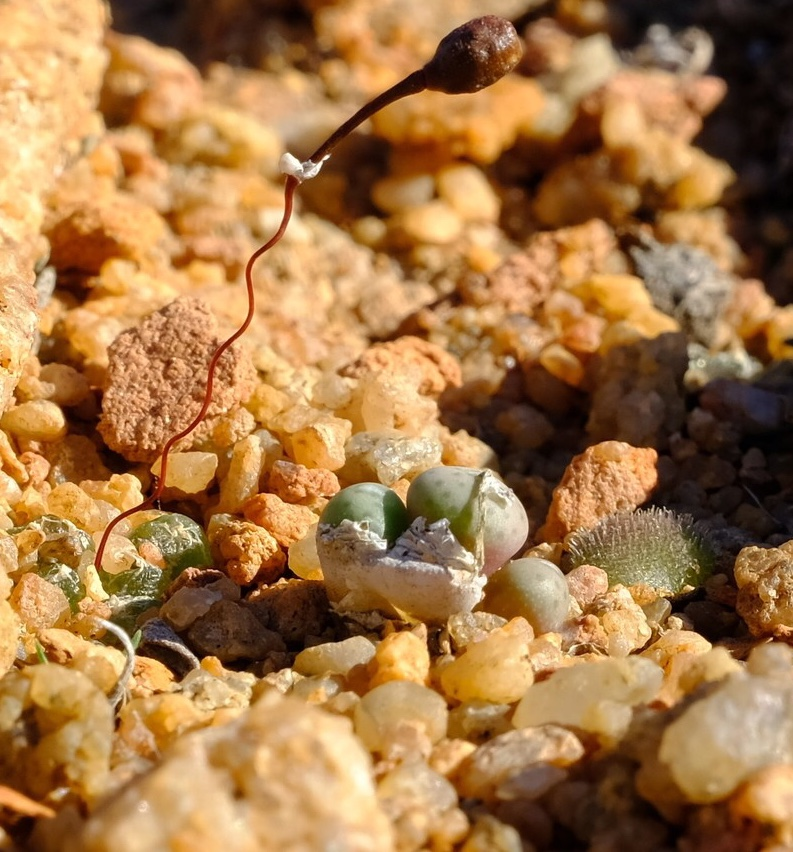

Scientific classification
- Kingdom: Plantae
- Clade: Embryophytes
- Clade: Tracheophytes
- Clade: Angiosperms
- Clade: Monocots
- Order: Asparagales
- Family: Asphodelaceae
- Subfamily: Asphodeloideae
- Genus: Bulbine
- Species: B. lolita

Binomial name
- Bulbine lolita S.A.Hammer

= Bulbine lolita =

Species of flowering plant

Bulbine lolita is a species of flowering plant in the family Asphodelaceae, native to the Knersvlakte region of the Northern Cape province of South Africa. It is the smallest known monocot succulent, measuring no more than 3/5ths inch (15 mm) wide by 1/4th inch (6 mm) in height. A recent discovery, it was unknown prior to 1999. It is also remarkable for its multicolored leaves.
