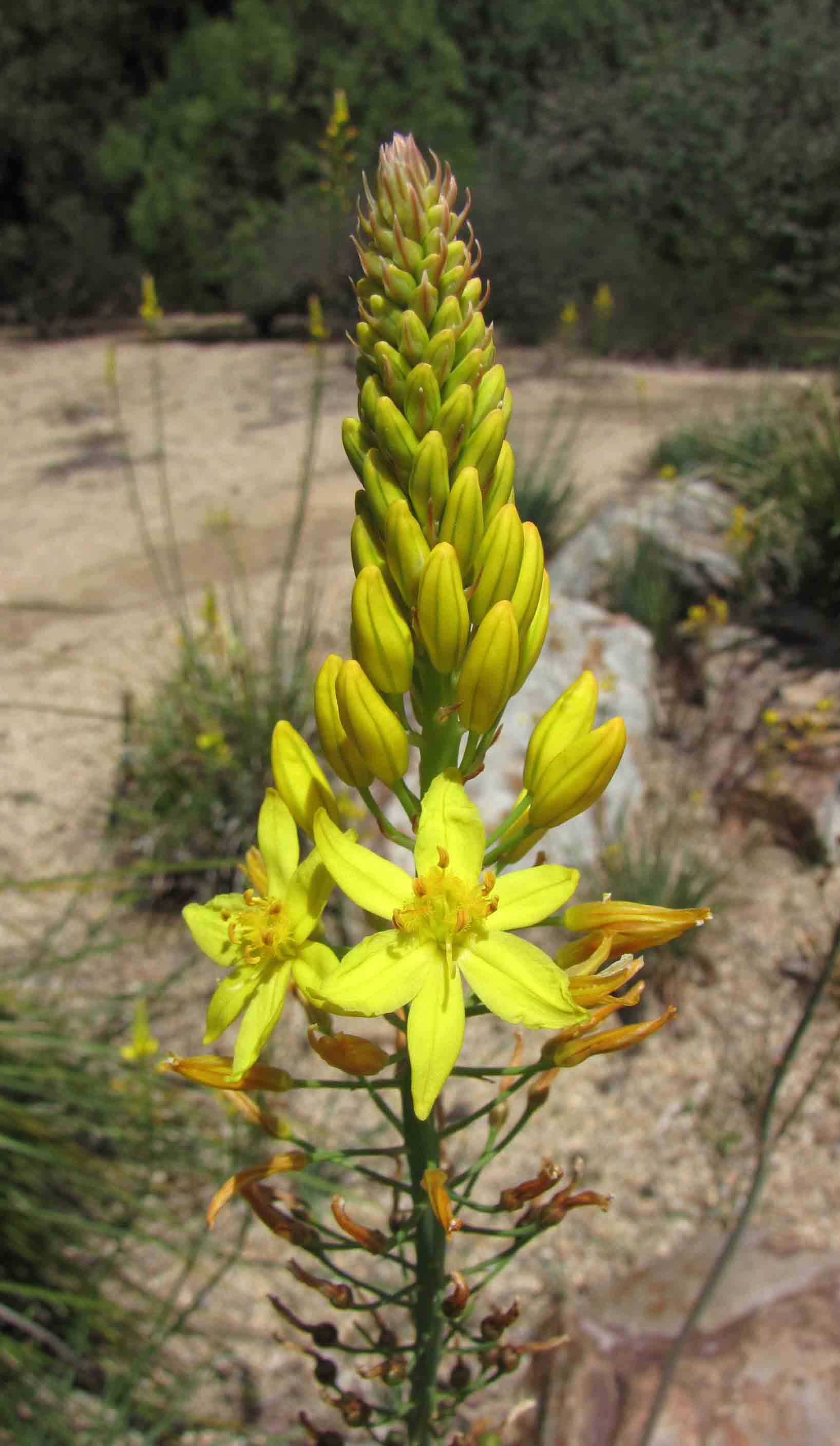

Scientific classification
- Kingdom: Plantae
- Clade: Tracheophytes
- Clade: Angiosperms
- Clade: Monocots
- Order: Asparagales
- Family: Asphodelaceae
- Subfamily: Asphodeloideae
- Genus: Bulbine
- Species: B. glauca

Binomial name
- Bulbine glauca (Raf.) E.M.Watson

= Bulbine glauca =

Species of flowering plant

Bulbine glauca is also known as rock lily. The genus Bulbine is made up of about fifty species. Most are native to Southern or Eastern Africa, but five species, including B. glauca, are native to Australia.

== Description ==
Bulbine glauca grows to about 50 cm (20 in.), with thick fleshy roots. The yellow flowers are small, shaped like a star and usually grow after rain. The flowers bloom in spring and sometimes in autumn if there is regular watering. There are 6 to 16 leaves on each plant and they are a blue-grey colour.

== Distribution ==
In Australia, B. glauca grows in Tasmania, New South Wales, and Victoria. It prefers high areas, especially along the Great Dividing Range.

== Cultivation ==
Bulbine glauca grows in rich, well-drained soil. The seedlings can be transplanted, but need regular watering. It is vulnerable to slugs, snails and kangaroos. It is frost tolerant. It can grow in full sun to light shade. It flowers for a long time, but needs pruning after flowering. The seeds and roots can be eaten.
