= Bulbine francescae =

Conservation status
- Least Concern (IUCN 3.1)

Scientific classification
- Kingdom: Plantae
- Clade: Tracheophytes
- Clade: Angiosperms
- Clade: Monocots
- Order: Asparagales
- Family: Asphodelaceae
- Subfamily: Asphodeloideae
- Genus: Bulbine
- Species: B. francescae

Binomial name
- Bulbine francescae G.Will. & Baijnath

Species of flowering plant

Bulbine francescae is a species of plant in the genus Bulbine. It is endemic to Namibia. Its natural habitat is rocky areas.
