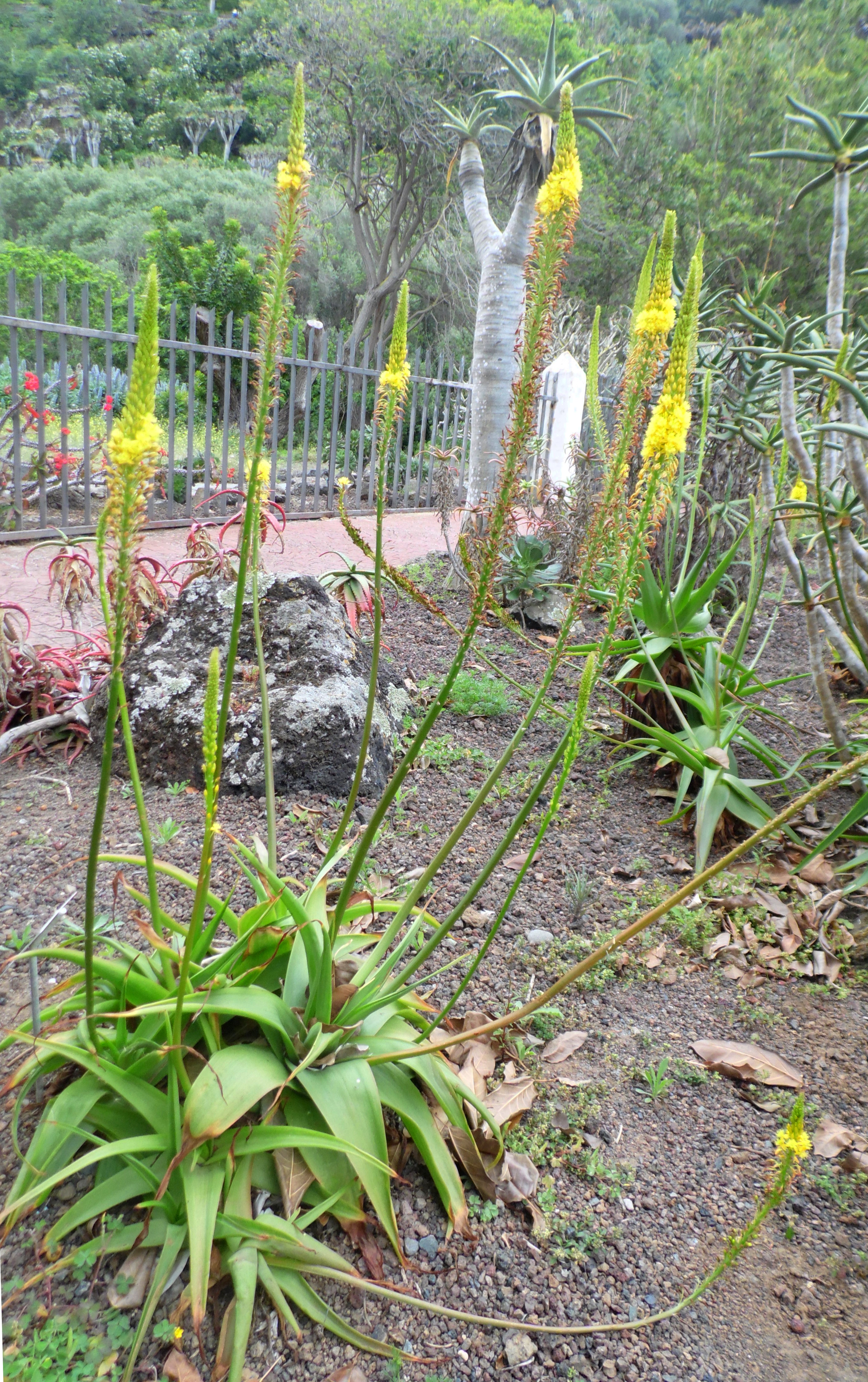

Scientific classification
- Kingdom: Plantae
- Clade: Tracheophytes
- Clade: Angiosperms
- Clade: Monocots
- Order: Asparagales
- Family: Asphodelaceae
- Subfamily: Asphodeloideae
- Genus: Bulbine
- Species: B. alooides

Binomial name
- Bulbine alooides (L.) Willd.

Synonyms
- Anthericum aloifolium Salisb. (1796), nom. superfl.; Anthericum alooides L. (1753); Bulbine acaulis L. (1762); Bulbine macrophylla Salm-Dyck (1834); Phalangium alooides (L.) Kuntze (1891)

= Bulbine alooides =

Species of flowering plant

Bulbine alooides ("Rooistorm") is a species of geophytic plant in the genus Bulbine. It is endemic to South Africa, where it grows in the Cape Provinces, KwaZulu-Natal, and Northern Provinces. It is widespread in rocky areas in the southern Cape Region.

== Description ==
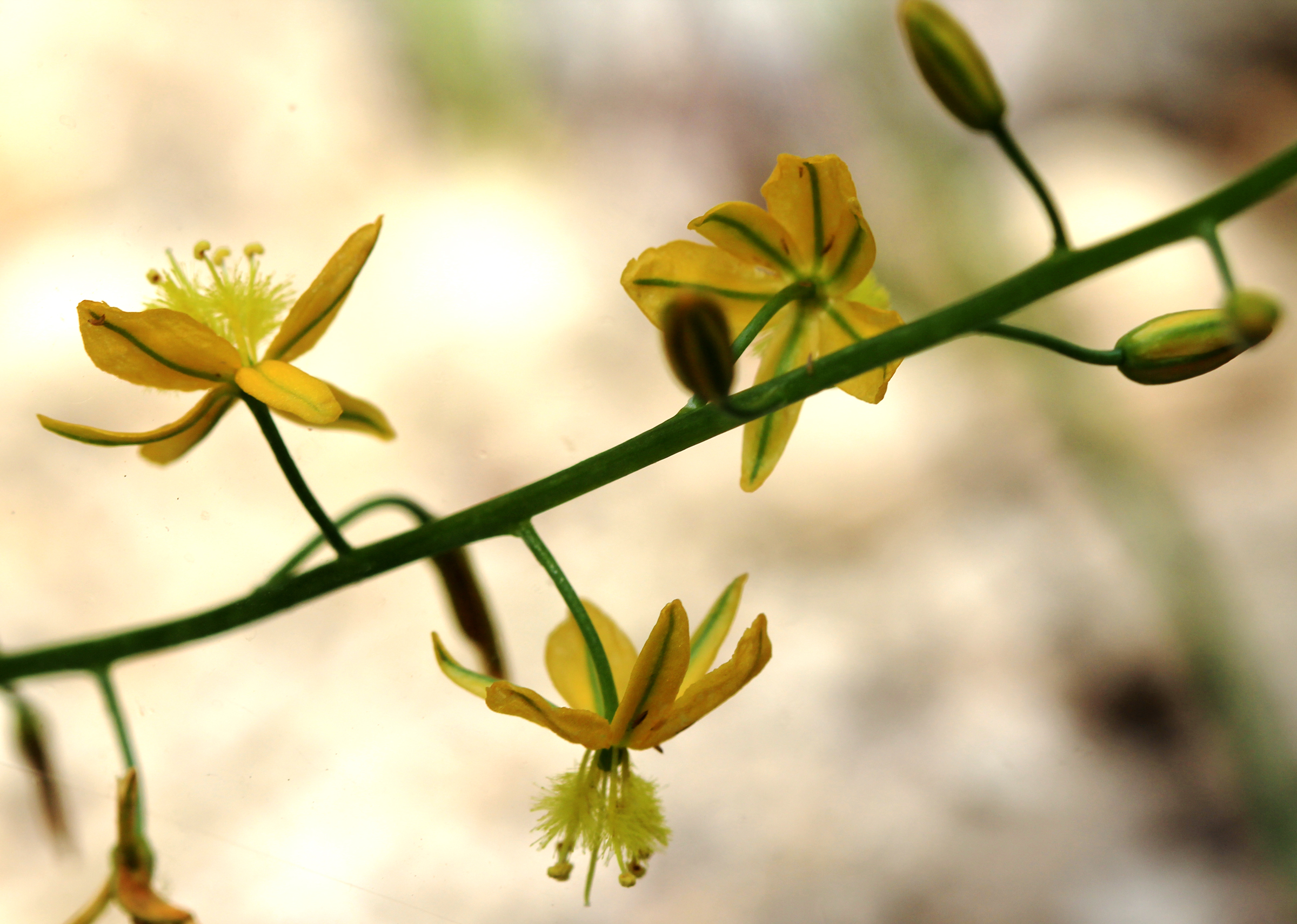
Detail of flowers

The leaves of this geophyte are basal. They are long, slender, lanceolate and channeled. The leaf margins are often hairy.

The vertical inflorescence has many flowers. Each flower is star-like, with six yellow petals that each have a longitudinal stripe down their middle. Like all Bulbine species, the stamens are distinctively tufted ("bearded").
