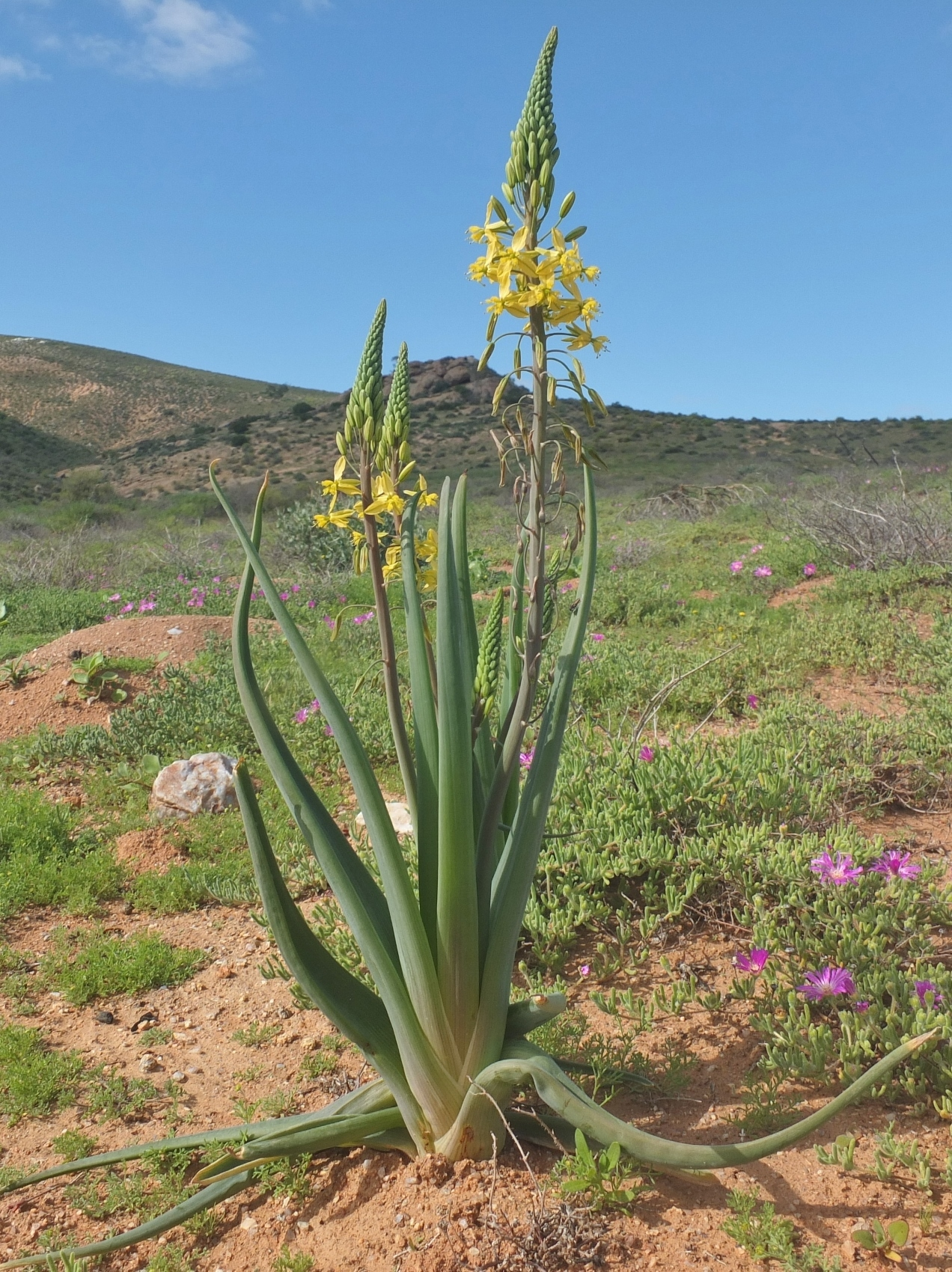

Conservation status
- Least Concern (SANBI Red List)

Scientific classification
- Kingdom: Plantae
- Clade: Tracheophytes
- Clade: Angiosperms
- Clade: Monocots
- Order: Asparagales
- Family: Asphodelaceae
- Subfamily: Asphodeloideae
- Genus: Bulbine
- Species: B. praemorsa

Binomial name
- Bulbine praemorsa (Jacq.) Spreng.

Synonyms
- Anthericum praemorsum Jacq.; Bulbine laxiflora Baker; Bulbine nutans Zeyh. ex Baker; Bulbine tetraphylla Dinter; Bulbine urgineoides Baker; Bulbine zeyheri Baker; Phalangium laxiflorum (Baker) Kuntze; Phalangium praemorsum (Jacq.) Kuntze; Phalangium urgineoides (Baker) Kuntze; Phalangium zeyheri (Baker) Kuntze

= Bulbine praemorsa =

Flowering geophyte plant found in the Cape Provinces

Bulbine praemorsa (locally known as Blougif, Slymstok, or Slymuintjie) is a species of tuberous, geophytic plant in the genus Bulbine, which grows in rocky terrain in South Africa.

== Distribution ==
Bulbine praemorsa is native to the Western Cape and Northern Cape Provinces, South Africa, from Namaqualand in the north, to Bredasdorp in the south.

Its typical habitat is high rocky slopes, usually of sandstone.

Bulbine praemorsa is classified as Least Concern.

== Description ==
The leaves are thick, succulent and channelled. The plants typically have a low neck of fibres around the base of the rosette.

Bulbine praemorsa usually flowers from June to September; its flowers are yellow or sometimes salmon-coloured. Its capsules are oblong.
