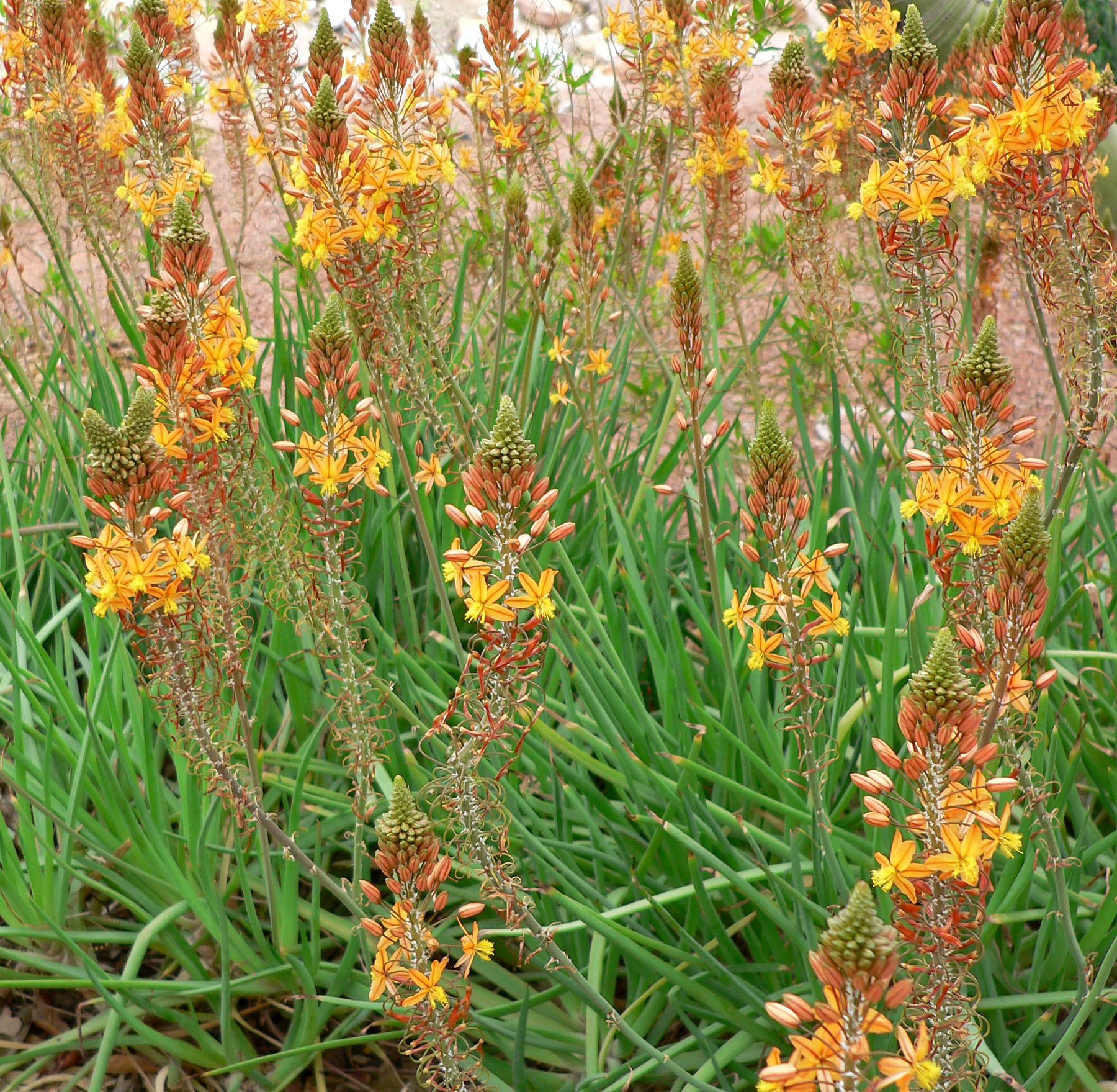

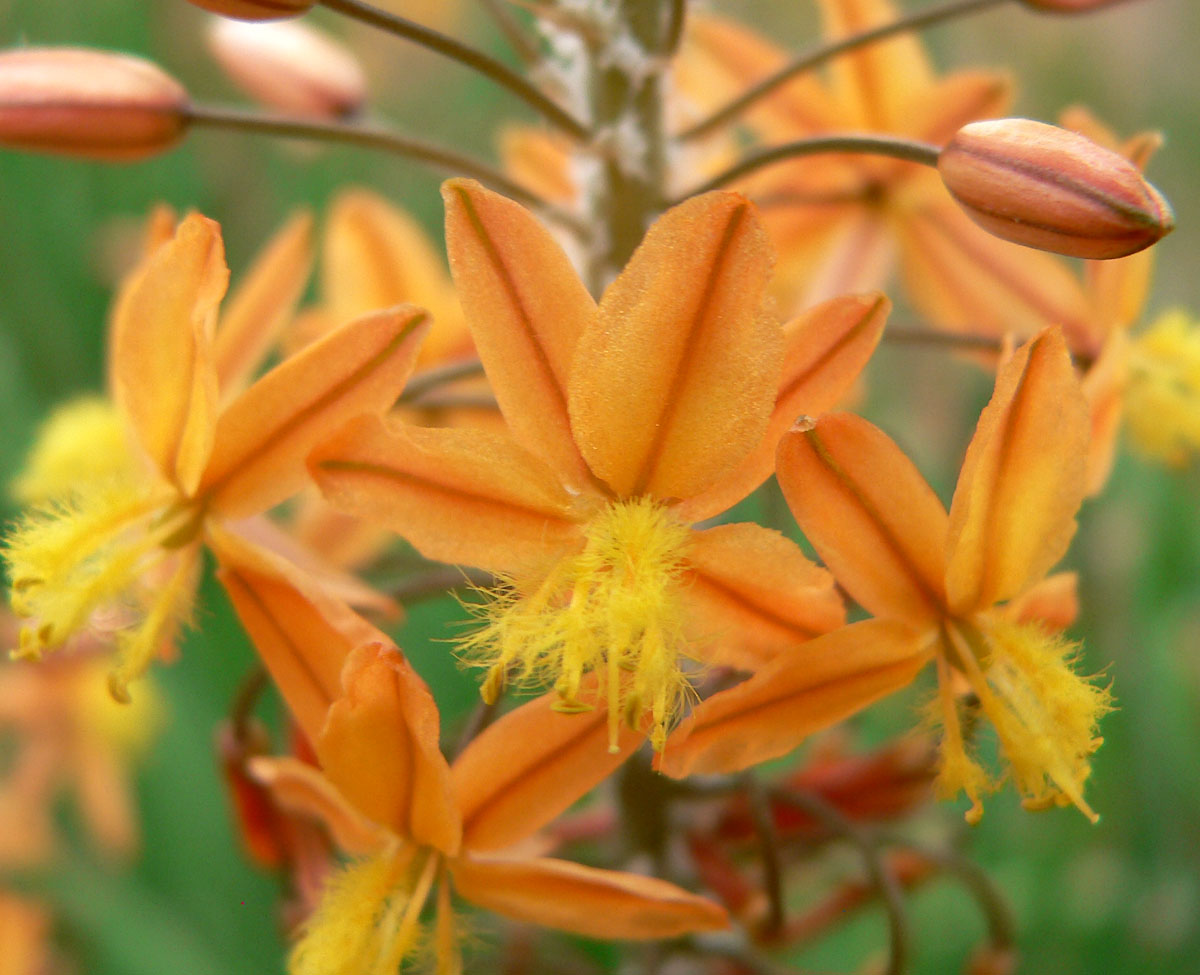

Conservation status
- Least Concern (SANBI Red List)

Scientific classification
- Kingdom: Plantae
- Clade: Tracheophytes
- Clade: Angiosperms
- Clade: Monocots
- Order: Asparagales
- Family: Asphodelaceae
- Subfamily: Asphodeloideae
- Genus: Bulbine
- Species: B. frutescens

Binomial name
- Bulbine frutescens (L.) Willd.

= Bulbine frutescens =

Species of flowering plant

Bulbine frutescens, the wild kopieva or stalked bulbine, is a species of flowering plant in the genus Bulbine, native to southern Africa (South Africa, Lesotho, Eswatini).

== Description ==
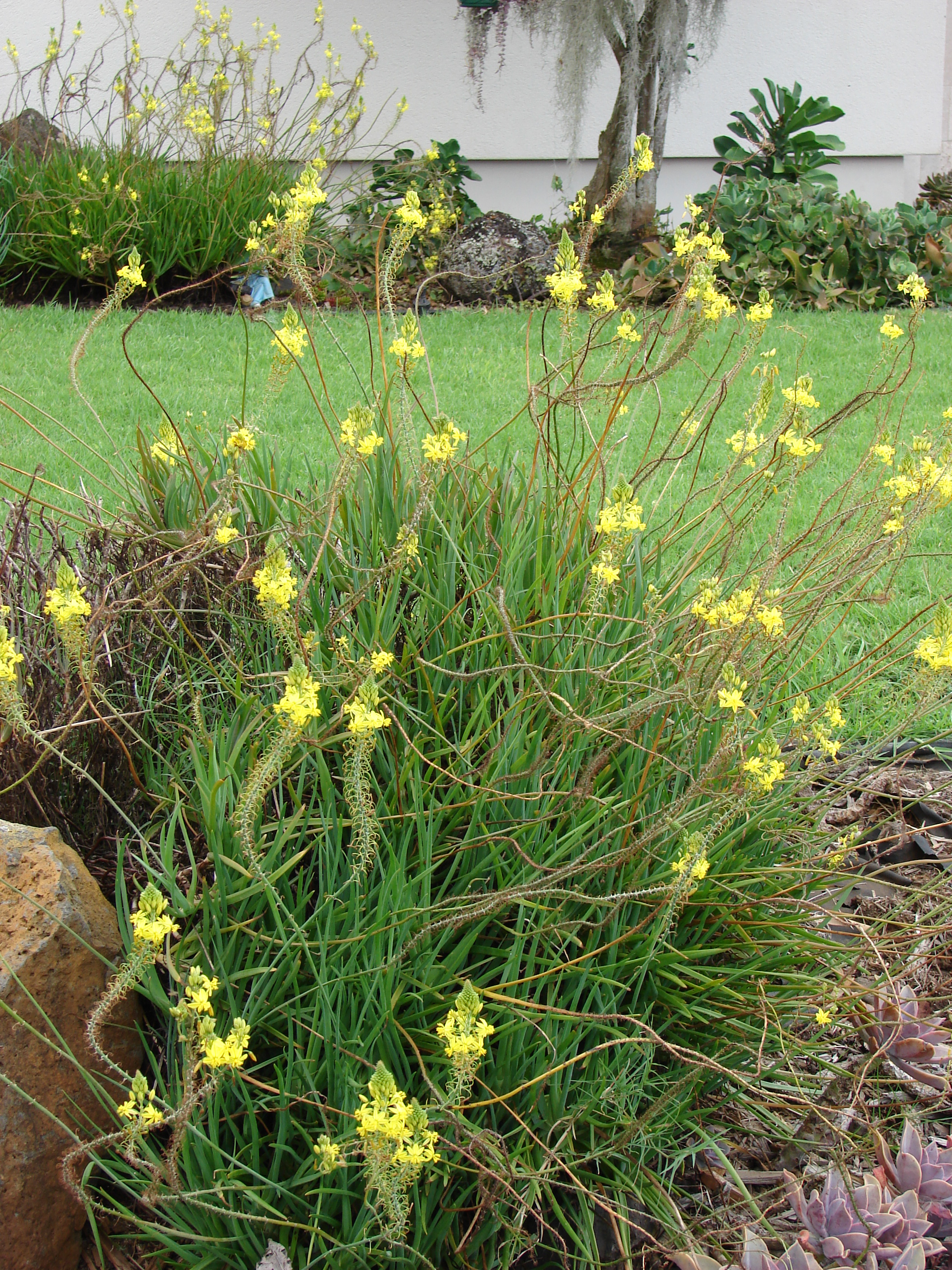
The typical shrubby growth of Bulbine frutescens (yellow-flowered form).

This variable species grows as a small shrub, with short, low stems that produce roots down towards the ground, and slender, erect, succulent, grey-green leaves.

The flowers appear throughout the summer, on a 30 cm erect inflorescence. The flowers can be orange, yellow or white. Like all Bulbine species, the stamens are distinctively tufted ("bearded").

== Growth ==
Bulbine frutescens is mostly dormant in summer, blooming in the spring, and then again in autumn although somewhat less. It can be propagated easily by stem cuttings. The cuttings can be planted immediately and kept in a shady area. They do not need any special attention or treatment, and build strong roots in a couple of months.

== Name ==
Bulbine comes from the Greek word bolbine, a general word for a bulbous plant, but particularly Ornithogalum. The name is misleading, as plants do not have a bulbous base.
