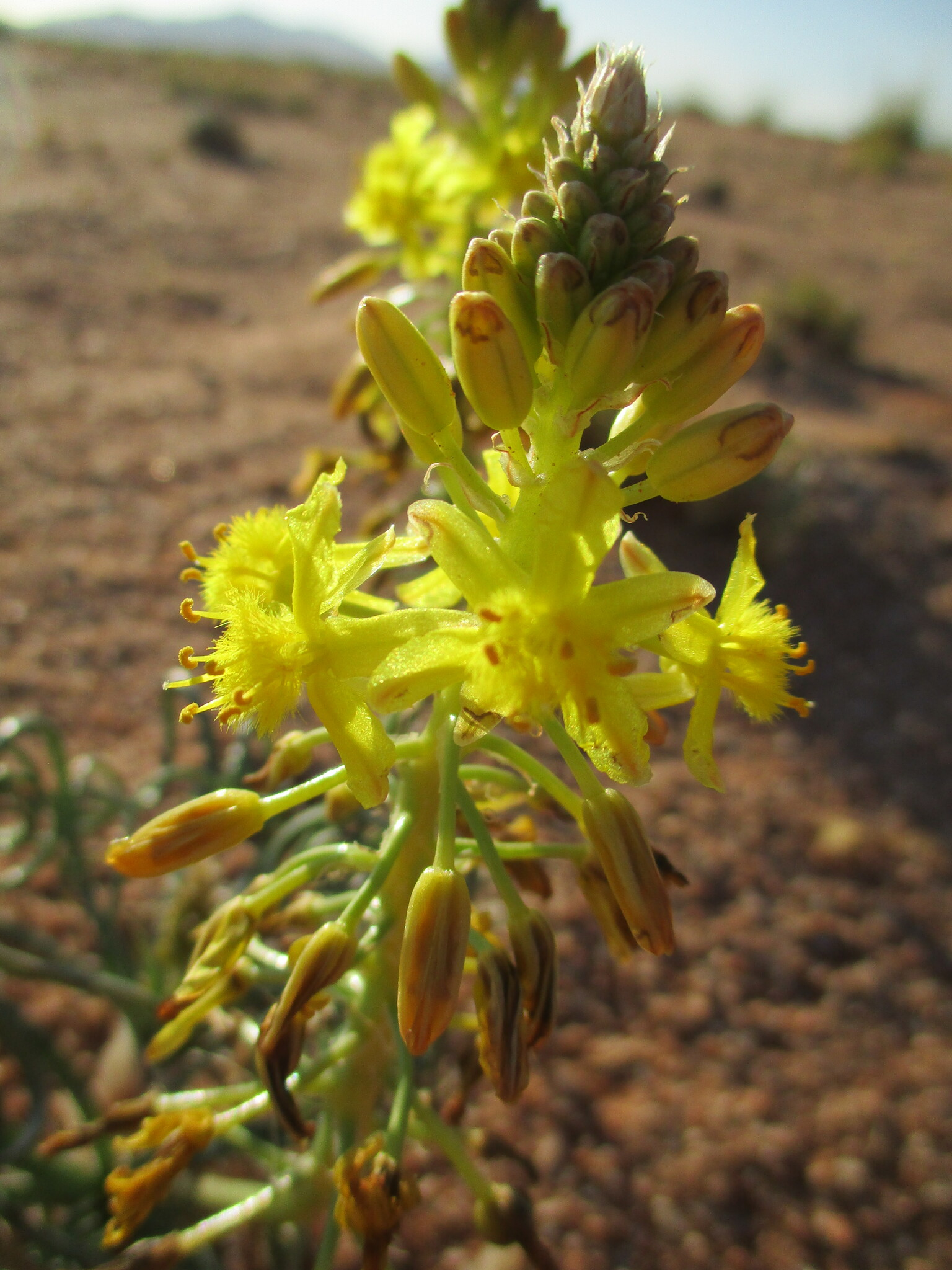

Conservation status
- Least Concern (IUCN 3.1)

Scientific classification
- Kingdom: Plantae
- Clade: Tracheophytes
- Clade: Angiosperms
- Clade: Monocots
- Order: Asparagales
- Family: Asphodelaceae
- Subfamily: Asphodeloideae
- Genus: Bulbine
- Species: B. namaensis

Binomial name
- Bulbine namaensis Schinz

= Bulbine namaensis =

Species of flowering plant

Bulbine namaensis is a species of plant in the genus Bulbine. It is native to Namibia and to the Cape Provinces in South Africa. Its natural habitat is dry savanna.
