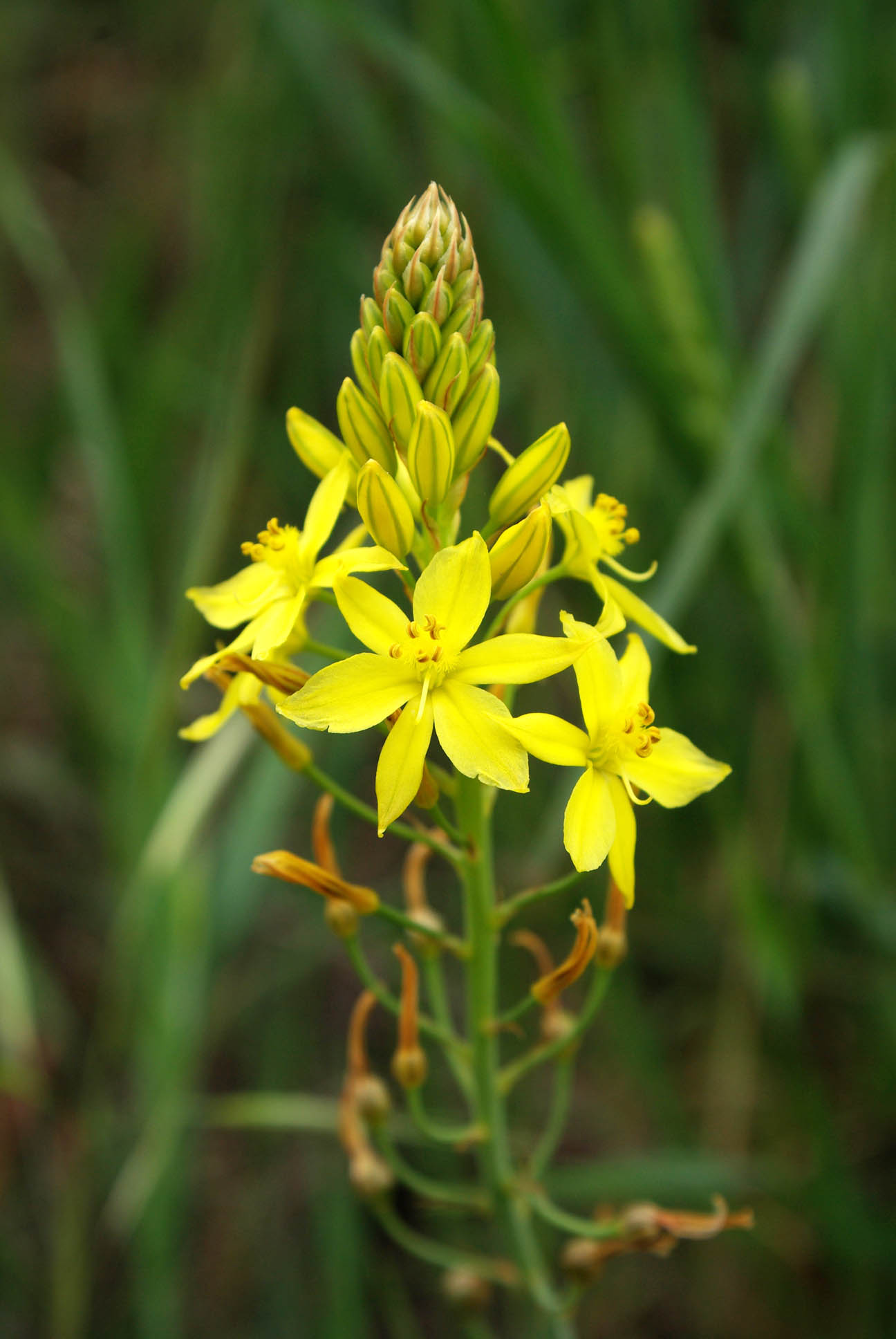
- Bulbine bulbosa near Hobart

Scientific classification
- Kingdom: Plantae
- Clade: Tracheophytes
- Clade: Angiosperms
- Clade: Monocots
- Order: Asparagales
- Family: Asphodelaceae
- Subfamily: Asphodeloideae
- Genus: Bulbine
- Species: B. bulbosa

Binomial name
- Bulbine bulbosa (R.Br.) Haw.

Synonyms
- Anthericum bulbosum R.Br.; Blephanthera depressa Raf. nom. illeg.; Blephanthera hookeri Raf.; Bulbine australis Spreng. nom. illeg.; Bulbine fraseri Kunth; Bulbinopsis bulbosa (R.Br.) Borzi; Phalangium bulbosum (R.Br.) Kuntze; Anthericum bulbosum auct. non R.Br.: Hooker, W.J. in Hooker, W.J. (ed.) (1830)

= Bulbine bulbosa =

Bulbine lily

Species of plant

Bulbine bulbosa, commonly known as bulbine lily, native leek, golden lily, or native onion, is a species of flowering plant in the family Asphodelaceae and is endemic to Australia. It is a perennial herb with thick roots, channelled leaves, and yellow flowers with hairy stamen filaments.

== Description ==
Bulbine bulbosa is a perennial herb that grows in tufts 27–75 cm (11–30 in) high with thick, fleshy roots and usually a bulb-like tuber. There are between three and seven leaves, channelled to more or less cylindrical, tapering and hollow, up to 30 cm (12 in) long and 1–5 mm (0.039–0.197 in) wide. The flowers are borne in racemes 4.5–26 cm (1.8–10.2 in) long with up to fifty fragrant flowers on one or two scapes 19–50 cm (7.5–19.7 in) long. Each flower is on a pedicel 5–30 mm (0.20–1.18 in) long with a bract 0.7–15 mm (0.028–0.591 in) long at the base. The six tepals are yellow, 9–22 mm (0.35–0.87 in) long and 1–3.5 mm (0.039–0.138 in) wide, and the stamens are 8–9 mm (0.31–0.35 in) long with golden-brown, club-shaped hairs on the filaments, and gold-coloured anthers. Flowering occurs from February to March and the fruit is a more or less spherical to oval capsule 3–6 mm (0.12–0.24 in) long.

== Taxonomy ==
This species was first formally described in 1810 by Robert Brown who gave it the name Anthericum bulbosa in his Prodromus Florae Novae Hollandiae et Insulae Van Diemen. In 1821, Adrian Hardy Haworth changed the name to Bulbine bulbosa in Revisiones Plantarum Succulentarum. The specific epithet (bulbosa) means "bulb", although the species does not form true bulbs.

The taxon may be a complex of up to four distinct species.

== Distribution and habitat ==
Bulbine bulbosa is found in all Australian states and the Australian Capital Territory, except for Western Australia and the Northern Territory. It grows in a wide range of habitats but usually in damp places in grassland, woodland and forest, sometimes at altitudes above 1,800 m (5,900 ft).

== Ecology ==
Experiments have shown that the ability of self-sown seeds of B. bulbosa to germinate between tufts of grasses of several species, depends on the species of grass and the gap width between the tufts. The experiments were performed to test the performance of the B. bulbosa in habitat reconstruction programs in south-eastern Australia.

== Uses ==
=== Bush food ===
The corms of mature plants are nutritious, containing calcium and iron, and were used as food by Aboriginal people, who called it parm, puewan, and pike. They regarded the corms as the sweetest-tasting of the lily and lily-like Australian plants.

=== Use in horticulture ===
The long-lasting stalks of fragrant, attractive yellow flowers and its moderate frost-hardiness have encouraged its use as a garden flower in suitable areas. Few garden varieties have been developed, however. The plant can be propagated from seeds or by division of the corm. Seeds are released from the ripened seed capsules and are best kept at least a month or two before use. They should be sown in the spring, and germination takes about 35 days. Watering and good drainage are essential.

The species suppresses self-fertilization, so collecting seeds from garden-grown plants may result in low germination. Planting seeds from multiple sources may increase yield.

== Toxicity ==
The plant is said to cause scouring if eaten by sheep or cattle.
