= Bulbine margarethae =

Conservation status
- Vulnerable (SANBI Red List)

Scientific classification
- Kingdom: Plantae
- Clade: Tracheophytes
- Clade: Angiosperms
- Clade: Monocots
- Order: Asparagales
- Family: Asphodelaceae
- Subfamily: Asphodeloideae
- Genus: Bulbine
- Species: B. margarethae

Binomial name
- Bulbine margarethae L.I. Hall

Species of flowering plant

Bulbine margarethae is a small, tuberous, perennial plant that often grows in clusters and is assigned to the Asphodelaceae. Its succulent leaves with a net-shaped marking are set as a rosette. It has flowers in a lax raceme with six yellow tepals and six filaments with many long perpendicular hairs. This species grows on the Knersvlakte, Northern Cape province of South Africa. The species is considered vulnerable because of limestone mining on 3 of 4 known locations.

== Description ==
Bulbine margarethae is a cluster-forming, stemless, perennial geophyte. It grows from an underground tuber that is rounded at the top and flat at the base, where it splits into several fleshy, finger-shaped extensions that sprout the fibrous roots. About 25 bright green, fleshy leaves of 2 cm (0.79 in) long and 0.5 cm (0.20 in) wide over most of its length form a rosette on the ground. These leaves have a net-shaped marking on its upper surface, suddenly end in a pointed tip, and both surfaces are concave and the margin is smooth. The inflorescence is a lax raceme of up to 15 cm (5.9 in) long that sits on an unbranched, upright, wiry, reddish brown stalk (or peduncle) of up to 10 cm (3.9 in) long and round in cross section. It carries up to 25 flowers that are each in the axil of a transparent bract with a reddish keel of 2–3 mm (0.079–0.118 in) wide, that clasp the inflorescence stem at their base and abruptly narrow into a about 5 mm (0.20 in) long cusp. Each flower grows on a stalk (or pedicel) of 8–10 mm (0.31–0.39 in) long which are spread when the flowers are open, but curve upwards when the fruit ripens. The tepals are yellow with a reddish keel. When open, the three outer tepals are about 9 mm (0.35 in) long and 2½ mm wide and are reflexed against the stalk, while the inner tepals are about 8 mm long and 6 mm wide and are spreading. The filaments of the three outer stamens are about 6 mm long and many yellow, 1½ mm long hairs that end in a knob on all sides, in the three inner stamens the hairs are only on the side bordering the tepal. The filaments are topped by about 1 mm anthers which are yellow on top and reddish below. The green, globe-shaped ovary is ribbed, about 1½ mm in diameter, and topped by an oblique style of about 6 mm long that end in a simple stigma. The ovary later develops into a straw-coloured, pear-shaped capsule of about 4 mm high and 3 mm in diameter with the remains of the perianth persisting for some time. The capsule contains black, angular seeds of about 1½ mm that have a very rough seed skin.

=== Differences with related species ===
Bulbine margarethae can easily be confused with Bulbine haworthioides but the latter species has shorter leaves that are not strap-shaped, darker green and with fringed margins. The leaf rosettes in B. haworthioides are single, not clustered.

== Taxonomy and naming ==
This species of kopieva was first described by the South African botanist Lisabel Irene Hall in 1984. Its name commemorates Margareth Wiese, wife to the owner of Quaggaskop Farm, where this species was found, in recognition for her assistance to botanical expeditions.

== Distribution, ecology and conservation ==
Bulbine margarethae grows in the cracks of limestone outcrops in the Knersvlakte just north of Vanrhynsdorp, Northern Cape province of South Africa. It can be found together with Brunsvigia radula, Antimima pygmaea, Antimima evoluta, Antimima dualis and Babiana carminea. It is a vulnerable species that is only known from four locations, at three of which limestone is mined, and this species is vulnerable for plant hunting.
