= Bulbine louwii =

Conservation status
- Rare (SANBI Red List)

Scientific classification
- Kingdom: Plantae
- Clade: Tracheophytes
- Clade: Angiosperms
- Clade: Monocots
- Order: Asparagales
- Family: Asphodelaceae
- Subfamily: Asphodeloideae
- Genus: Bulbine
- Species: B. louwii

Binomial name
- Bulbine louwii L.I. Hall

Species of flowering plant

Bulbine louwii is a small, tuberous, perennial plant that grows with individual leaf rosettes and is assigned to the Asphodelaceae. Its initially green, later reddish brown succulent leaves have distinct parallel veins. It has flowers in a lax raceme with six pale yellow tepals and six filaments with many long perpendicular hairs. This species grows on the Knersvlakte, Northern Cape province of South Africa. This species is currently not declining but considered rare.

== Description ==
Bulbine louwii is an individually growing, stemless, perennial geophyte. It grows from an underground tuber that is long rounded at the top and flat at the base, where it splits into several fleshy, finger-shaped extensions of up to 12 mm (0.47 in) that extending in a fibrous root. It has 25-30 leaves which are at first light to dark green, later reddish brown. These leaves are fleshy, having a broad, flat end with a tiny pointed tip, tapering into a narrower base, and fringed with a row of hairs on the margins. The leaves are 4 cm (1.6 in) long and 8–10 mm (0.31–0.39 in) wide over most of its length and form a rosette on the ground. Each rosette may carry one or two lax raceme that sit on upright, wiry, reddish brown stalk (or peduncle) round in cross section of up to 12 cm (4.7 in) long, 1½-2 mm wide. It carries up to 30-40 flowers that are each in the axil of a shortly triangular, pointed transparent bract of 2–3 mm (0.079–0.118 in) long. Each flower grows on an ascending stalk (or pedicel) of 10–12 mm (0.39–0.47 in) long, curving downwards after flowering and curving upwards when the fruit is ripe. The tepals are pale yellow with a reddish keel, spreading to reflexed when open. When open, the three outer tepals are about 10 mm (0.39 in) long and 3 mm wide, while the inner tepals are about 10 mm long and 6 mm wide. The six filaments carry yellow, club-shaped hairs, in the three inner filaments these hairs are in two distinct zones above and below the middle. The filaments are topped by about 1 mm long, oblong, yellow anthers. The green, oblong ovary is ribbed, about 1½ mm high, and topped by a somewhat oblique style of about 7 mm long that end in a simple stigma. The ovary later develops into a capsule of about 4 mm high.

=== Differences with related species ===
Bulbine louwii can be distinguished from other dwarf Bulbine species because it has spatula-shaped leaves with a membranaceous and clasping base, that grow in single, erect, tight rosettes.

== Taxonomy and naming ==
This species of kopieva was first described by the South African botanist Lisabel Irene Hall in 1984. Its name commemorates Piet Louw, owner of Arizona Farm, where this species was found.

== Distribution, ecology and conservation ==
Bulbine louwii grows in white quartz pepple fields in the Knersvlakte just north of Vanrhynsdorp, Northern Cape province of South Africa. It can be found together with several species of Agyroderma, Conophytum calculus, Crassula globosa, and Othonna intermedia. It is a rare species that is only known from less than five locations, but is not under threat.
