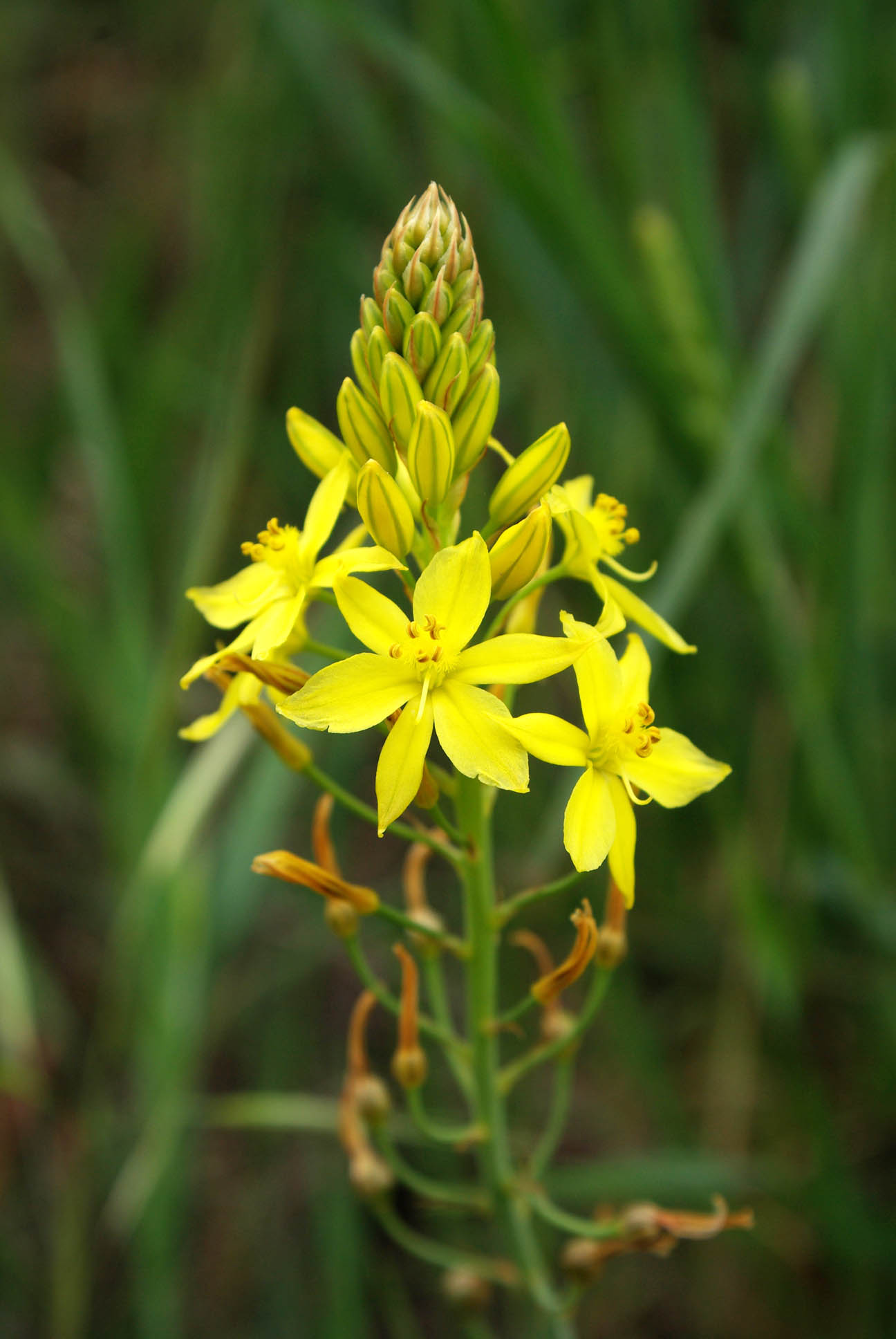
- Bulbine bulbosa

Scientific classification
- Kingdom: Plantae
- Clade: Embryophytes
- Clade: Tracheophytes
- Clade: Angiosperms
- Clade: Monocots
- Order: Asparagales
- Family: Asphodelaceae
- Subfamily: Asphodeloideae
- Genus: Bulbine; Wolf, 1776

Synonyms
- Blephanthera Raf.; Nemopogon Raf.; Phalangium Möhring ex Kuntze 1891 not Mill. 1754 nor Burm.f. 1768; Bulbinopsis Borzì

= Bulbine =

Genus of flowering plants

Bulbine is a genus of plants in the family Asphodelaceae and subfamily Asphodeloideae, named for the bulb-shaped tuber of many species. It was formerly placed in the Liliaceae. It is found chiefly in Southern Africa, with a few species extending into tropical Africa and a few others in Australia and Yemen.

Bulbine is a genus of succulent plants with flowers borne in lax or compound racemes. The flowers are usually yellow, with bearded stamens; some species have white, orange, or pink flowers. Several species are grown in gardens, especially B. frutescens. Species of Bulbine resemble Haworthia and Aloe in appearance, but with soft, fleshy leaves and tuberous roots or a caudex. They are shrubs, weedy perennials, dwarf geophytes (including Bulbine lolita, the smallest of all succulent Monocots), and soft annuals. Many of the dwarf species have small, dome-shaped tubers.

Dormancy usually extends from late spring to autumn, but it varies among species and in different conditions. The leaves die and drop, the roots contract into the caudex, and the aboveground parts wither. Propagation is mostly by seed, but some species form multiple heads or offsets and can be propagated with cuttings.

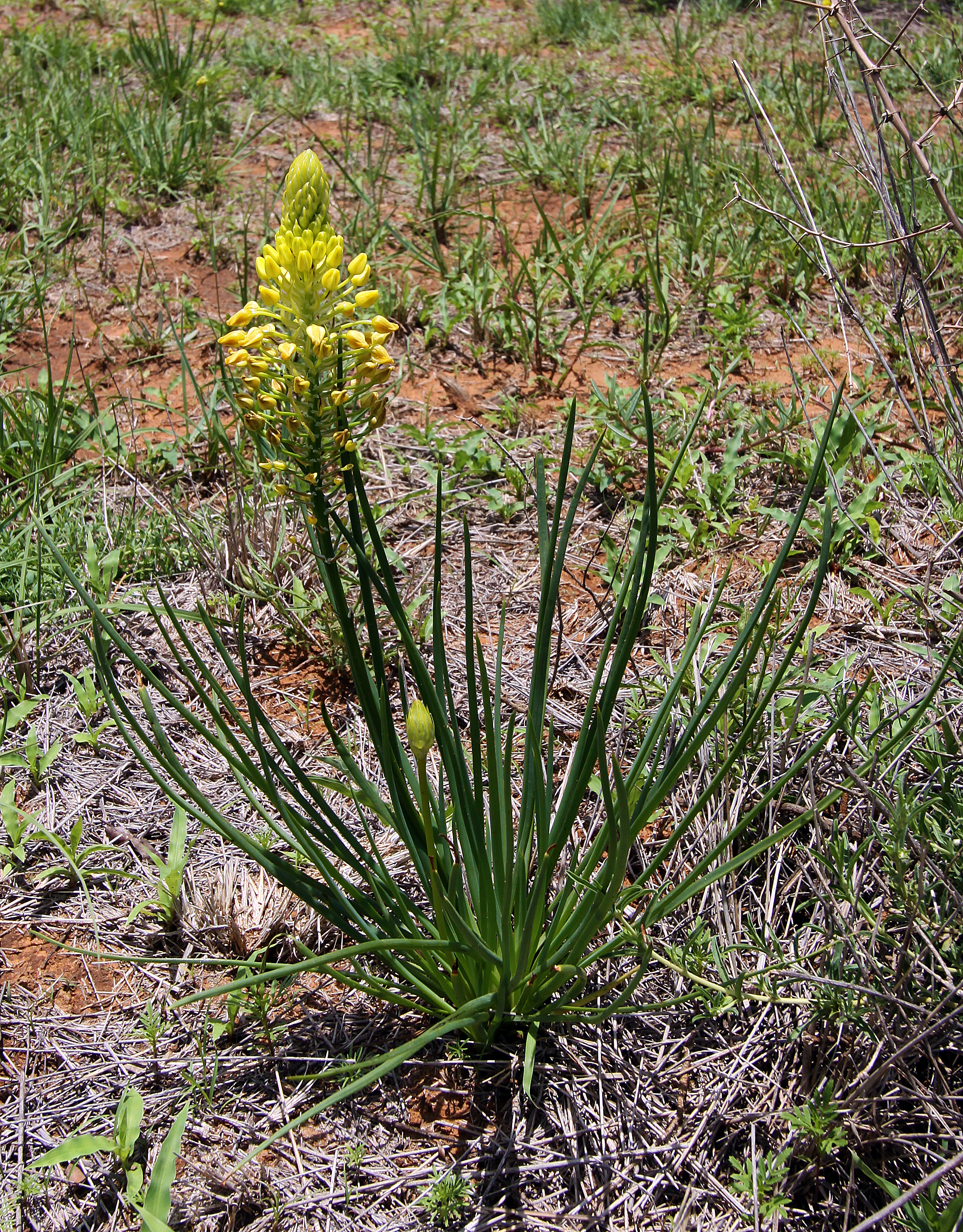
Bulbine abyssinica, a common species that occurs throughout southern and east Africa

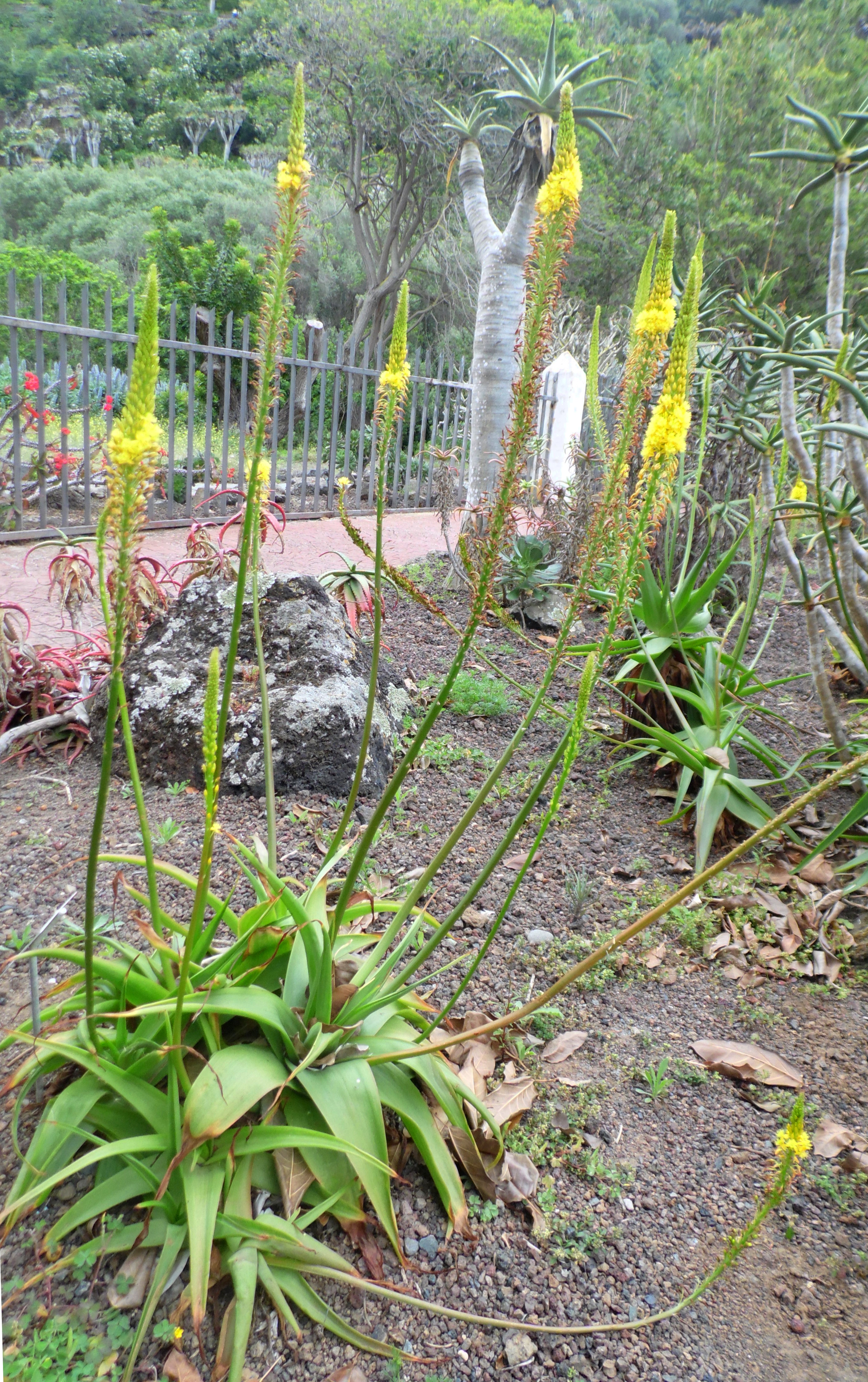
Bulbine alooides, a species from the southern Cape, South Africa

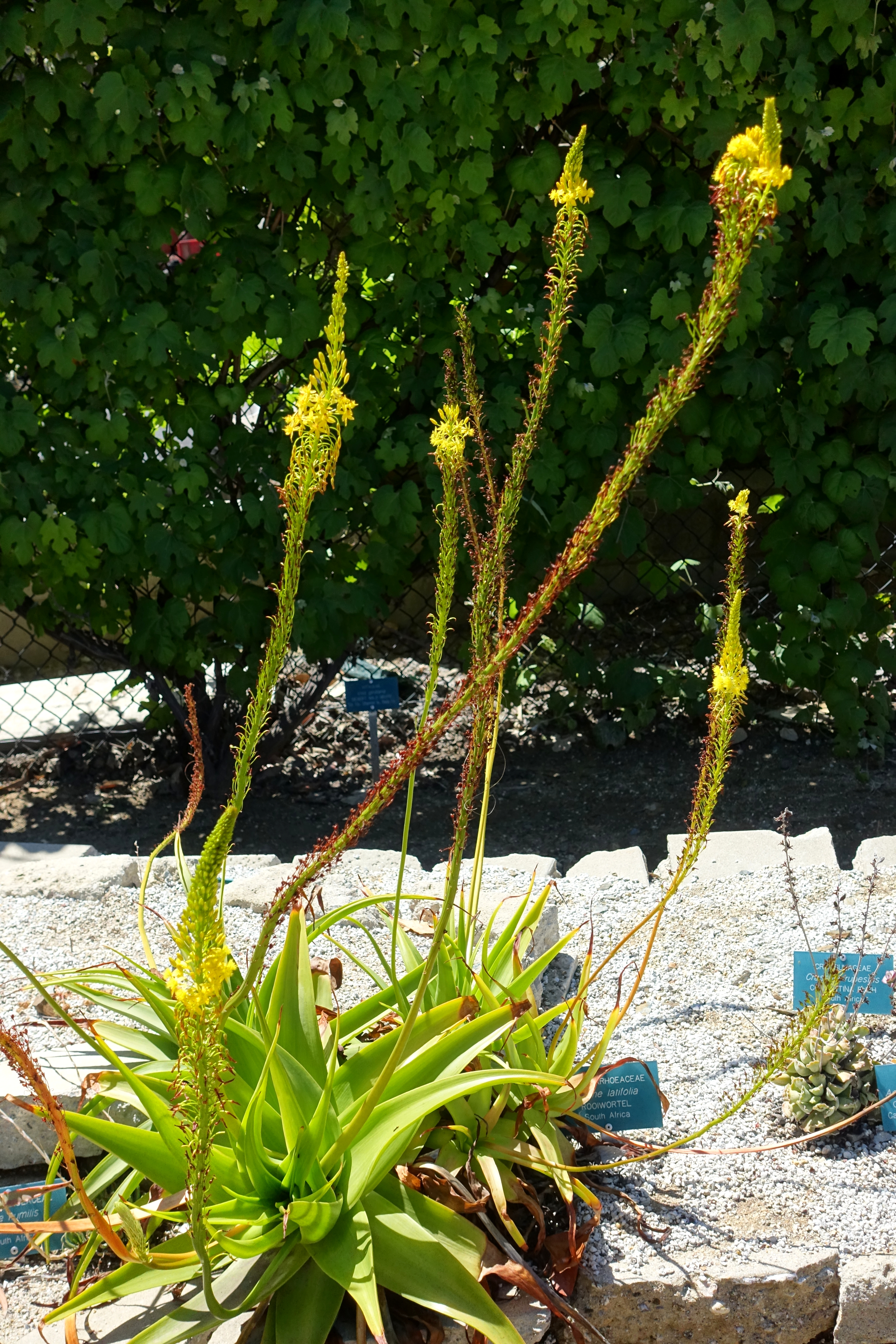
Bulbine latifolia

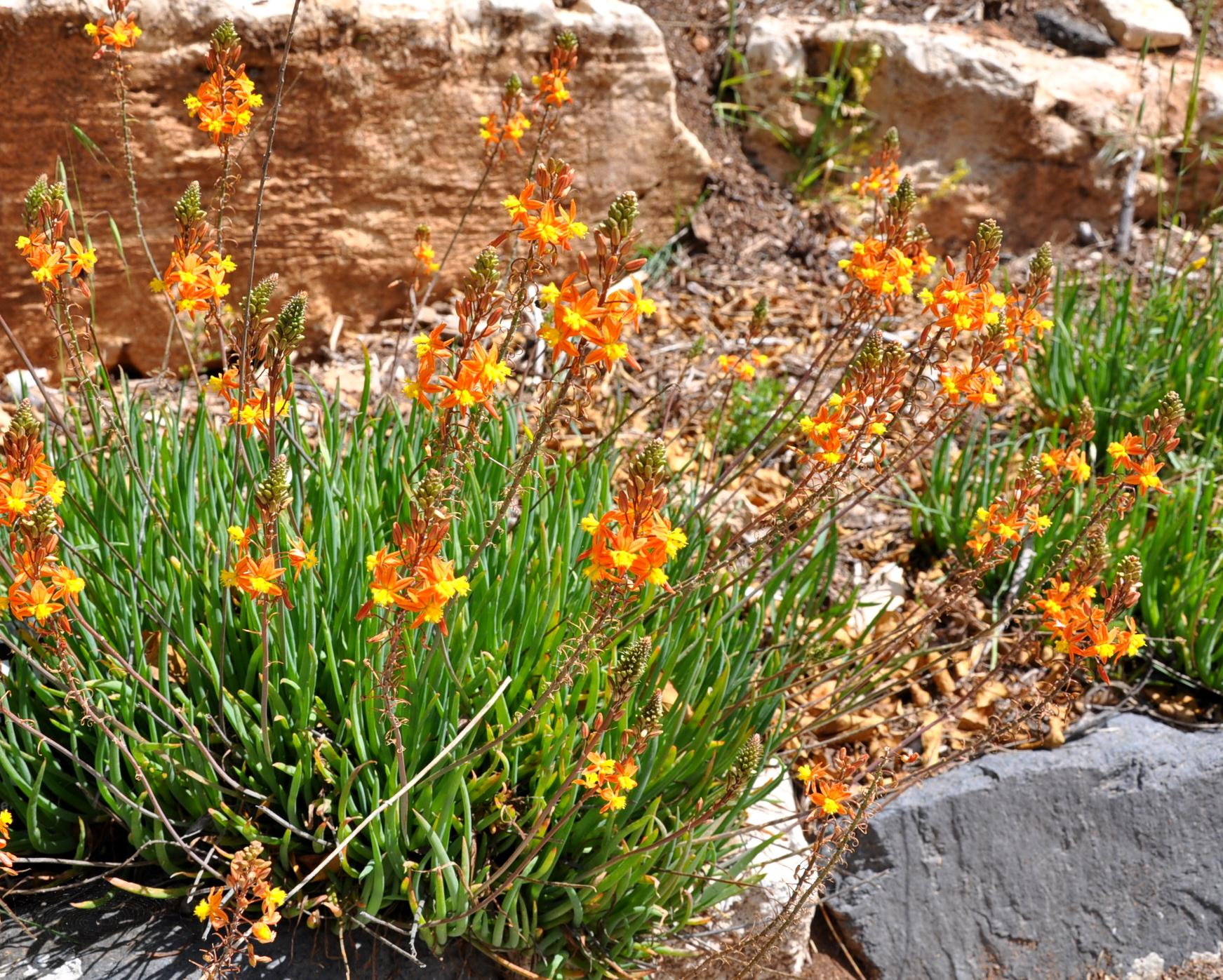
Bulbine frutescens, a species very common in cultivation

== Species ==
Species include:

- Bulbine abyssinica A.Rich.
- Bulbine alata Baijnath
- Bulbine alooides (L.) Willd.
- Bulbine alveolata S.A.Hammer
- Bulbine angustifolia Poelln.
- Bulbine annua (L.) Willd.
- Bulbine asphodeloides (L.) Spreng.
- Bulbine bachmannii Baker
- Bulbine bruynsii S.A.Hammer
- Bulbine bulbosa (R.Br.) Haw.
- Bulbine capensis Baijnath ex G.Will.
- Bulbine capitata Poelln.
- Bulbine cepacea (Burm.f.) Wijnands
- Bulbine coetzeei Oberm.
- Bulbine crassa D.I.Morris & Duretto
- Bulbine cremnophila van Jaarsv.
- Bulbine crocea Guth.
- Bulbine dactylopsoides G.Will.
- Bulbine dewetii van Jarssv.
- Bulbine diphylla Schltr. ex Poelln.
- Bulbine disimilis G.Will.
- Bulbine erectipilosa G.Will.
- Bulbine erumpens S.A.Hammer
- Bulbine esterhuyseniae Baijnath
- Bulbine fallax Poelln.
- Bulbine favosa (Thunb.) Schult. & Schult.f.
- Bulbine flexicaulis Baker
- Bulbine flexuosa Schltr.
- Bulbine foleyi E.Phillips
- Bulbine fragilis G.Williamson
- Bulbine francescae G.Will. & Baijnath
- Bulbine frutescens (L.) Willd.
- Bulbine glauca (Raf.) E.M.Watson
- Bulbine haworthioides B.Nord.
- Bulbine inamarxiae G.Will. & A.P.Dold
- Bulbine inflata Oberm.
- Bulbine lagopus (Thunb.) N.E.Br.
- Bulbine lamprophylla Williamson
- Bulbine latifolia (L.f.) Spreng.
- Bulbine lavrani G.Will. & Baijnath
- Bulbine lolita S.A.Hammer
- Bulbine longifolia Schinz
- Bulbine louwii L.I.Hall
- Bulbine margarethae L.I.Hall
- Bulbine meiringii van Jaarsv.
- Bulbine melanovaginata G.Will.
- Bulbine mesembryanthemoides Haw.
- Bulbine minima Baker
- Bulbine monophylla Poelln.
- Bulbine muscicola G.Will.
- Bulbine namaensis Schinz
- Bulbine narcissifolia Salm-Dyck
- Bulbine navicularifolia G.Will.
- Bulbine nutans Roem. & Schult.
- Bulbine ophiophylla G.Will.
- Bulbine pendens G.Will. & Baijnath
- Bulbine pendula Keighery
- Bulbine praemorsa (Jacq.) Spreng.
- Bulbine quartzicola G.Williamson
- Bulbine ramosa van Jaarsv.
- Bulbine retinens van Jaarsv. & S.A.Hammer
- Bulbine rhopalophylla Dinter
- Bulbine rupicola G.Will.
- Bulbine sedifolia Schltr. ex Poelln.
- Bulbine semenaliundata G.Will.
- Bulbine semibarbata (R.Br.) Haw.
- Bulbine stolonifera Baijnath ex G.Will.
- Bulbine striata Baijnath & Van Jaarsv.
- Bulbine succulenta Compton
- Bulbine suurbergensis van Jaarsv. & A.E.van Wyk
- Bulbine thomasiae van Jaarsv.
- Bulbine torsiva G.Williamson
- Bulbine torta N.E.Br.
- Bulbine triebneri Dinter
- Bulbine truncata G.Williamson
- Bulbine vagans E.M.Watson
- Bulbine vitrea G.Will. & Baijnath
- Bulbine vittatifolia G.Williamson
- Bulbine wiesei L.I.Hall
