= Bulbine wiesei =

Conservation status
- Rare (SANBI Red List)

Scientific classification
- Kingdom: Plantae
- Clade: Tracheophytes
- Clade: Angiosperms
- Clade: Monocots
- Order: Asparagales
- Family: Asphodelaceae
- Subfamily: Asphodeloideae
- Genus: Bulbine
- Species: B. wiesei

Binomial name
- Bulbine wiesei L.I. Hall

Species of flowering plant

Bulbine wiesei is a small, tuberous, perennial plant that grows with single leaf rosettes and is assigned to the Asphodelaceae. It has pale green succulent leaves set in a rosette. It has flowers in a lax raceme with six pale yellow tepals and six filaments with many long perpendicular hairs. This species grows in a succulent Karoo vegetationbedtween white quartz pebbles, both in the far north of the Western Cape and the southwest of the Northern Cape province of South Africa. With only five known populations, the species is considered rare but does not appear to have any threats.

== Description ==
Bulbine wiesei is a stemless, perennial geophyte that occurs with individual rosettes. It grows from an underground tuber of about 1 cm (0.39 in) high and 1½ cm in diameter, rounded at the top where it is covered by a tough, brown tunic and a collar of ow the small bristles surrounding the base of the leaves. From its flat base the roots emerge. Up to 20 upright, tightly packed, pale green, fleshy leaves of 35–40 mm (1.4–1.6 in) long and about 0.5 cm (0.20 in) wide, rounded on the side facing away from the centre and with a gully on the side facing towards the centre form a rosette on the ground. These leaves have a silvery shine and a pointed tip. [...] The inflorescence is a lax raceme that sits on an unbranched, upright, wiry, reddish-brown stalk (or peduncle) of up to 10 cm (3.9 in) long and 1 mm wide that is round in cross section. It carries up to 20 flowers of which two or three are open simultaneously, that are each in the axil of a transparent, shortly triangular bract with a reddish keel of 2–3 mm (0.079–0.118 in) wide, that clasps the inflorescence stem at their base and abruptly narrows into a cusp about 3 mm (0.12 in) long. Each flower grows on a stalk (or pedicel) of 10–12 mm (0.39–0.47 in) long which is spread horizontally when the flowers are open, swings down afterwards, but curves upwards when the fruit ripens. The tepals are pale yellow with a green keel. When open, the three outer tepals are about 8 mm (0.31 in) long and 3 mm wide and are reflexed against the stalk, while the inner tepals are about 8 mm long and 6 mm wide and only slightly reflexed. The six stamens are about 6 mm (0.24 in) long. The filaments carry about 2 in (51 mm)mm long, club-shaped hairs. On the three inner filaments the hairs are only on the side bordering the tepal from the base, but spread full circle from about 1 mm below the end. The filaments are topped by about 1 mm long, yellow, oblong anthers. The pale green, oblong ovary is about 1½ mm high, has 6 ribs, and is topped by an oblique style of about 7 mm long that ends in a simple stigma. The ovary later develops into a pale brown, pear-shaped capsule of about 4 mm high and 3 mm in diameter with the remains of the perianth persisting for some time. The capsule contains black, angular seeds of about 2 mm high and 1 mm in diameter that have a very rough seed skin.

=== Differences with related species ===
Bulbine wiesei can be distinguished from other dwarf Bulbine species by having a brown tunic covering the tuber and having leaves with a distinct silvery sheen.

== Taxonomy and naming ==
This species of kopieva was first described by the South African botanist Lisabel Irene Hall in 1984. It is named after Buis Wiese, owner of Quaggaskop Farm, where this species was found.

== Distribution, ecology and conservation ==
Bulbine wiesei grows as isolated plants 0n loam between light quartz accompanied by little subshrubs of the genus Ruschia, Monilaria, and Conophytum minimum. It is a rare species that is only known from five locations, but is currently not threatened.
