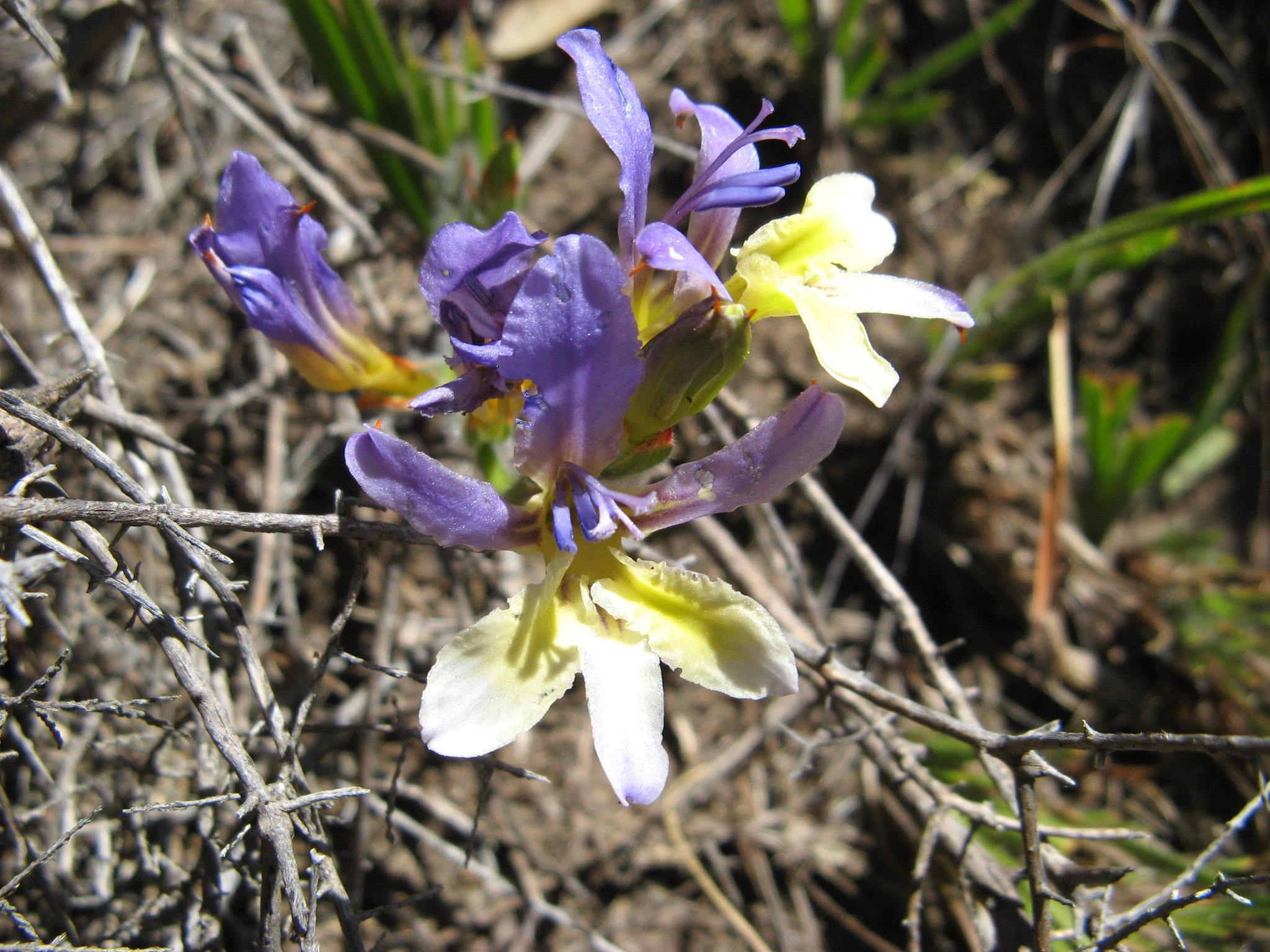

Scientific classification
- Kingdom: Plantae
- Clade: Tracheophytes
- Clade: Angiosperms
- Clade: Monocots
- Order: Asparagales
- Family: Iridaceae
- Genus: Babiana
- Species: B. auriculata

Binomial name
- Babiana auriculata G.J.Lewis

= Babiana auriculata =

Species of flowering plant

Babiana auriculata is a perennial flowering plant and geophyte belonging to the genus Babiana and is part of the fynbos. The species is endemic to the Western Cape. It occurs in the Pakhuis Mountains. It has a range of less than 100 km² and there are four subpopulations. The species is considered rare.
