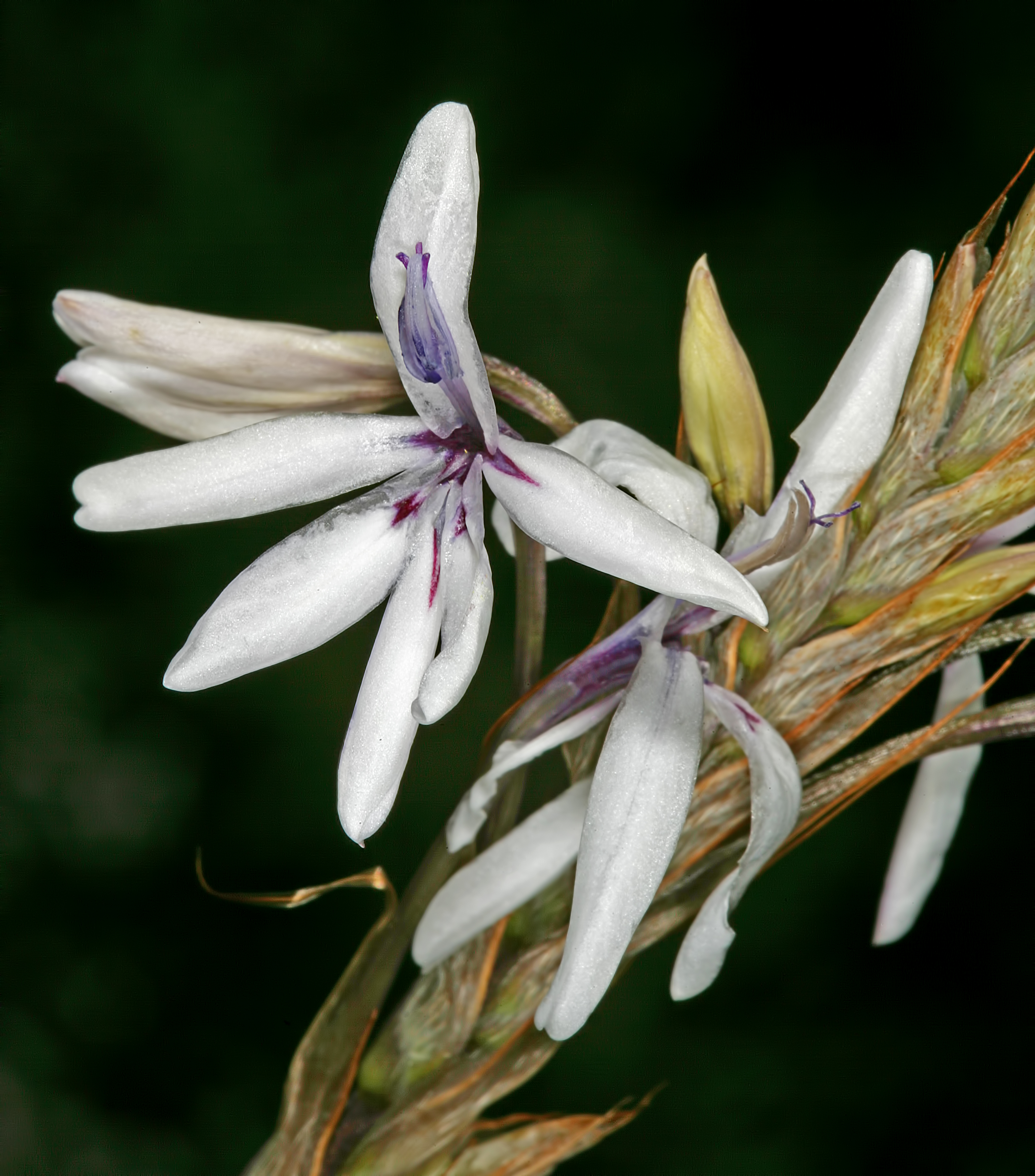

Scientific classification
- Kingdom: Plantae
- Clade: Tracheophytes
- Clade: Angiosperms
- Clade: Monocots
- Order: Asparagales
- Family: Iridaceae
- Genus: Babiana
- Species: B. spathacea

Binomial name
- Babiana spathacea (L.f.) Ker Gawl.

Synonyms
- Babiana densiflora Klatt; Gladiolus paleaceus Vahl; Gladiolus spathaceus L.f.

= Babiana spathacea =

Species of flowering plant

Babiana spathacea is a perennial flowering plant and geophyte belonging to the genus Babiana. The species is endemic to the Northern Cape.
