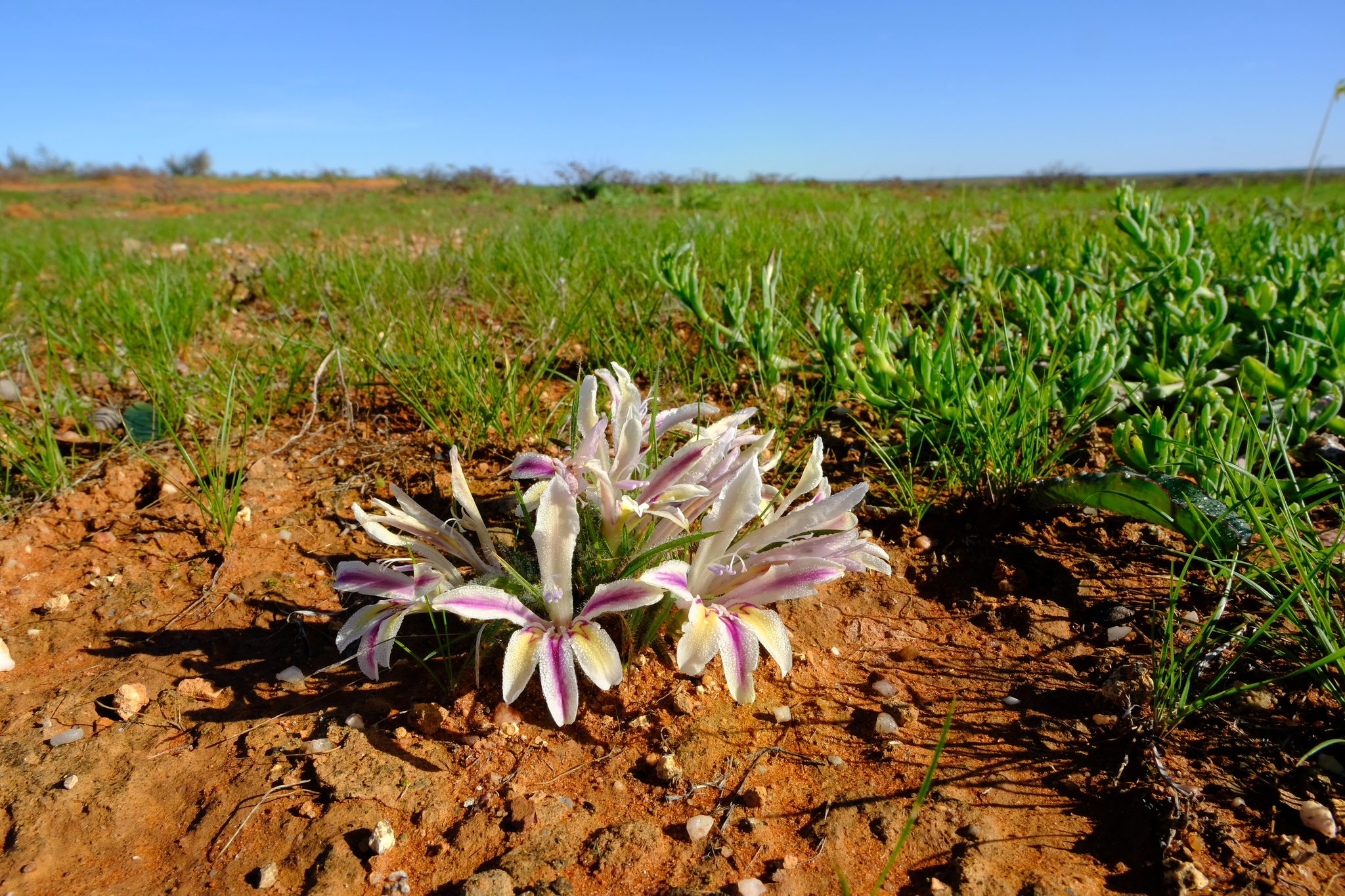

Scientific classification
- Kingdom: Plantae
- Clade: Embryophytes
- Clade: Tracheophytes
- Clade: Spermatophytes
- Clade: Angiosperms
- Clade: Monocots
- Order: Asparagales
- Family: Iridaceae
- Genus: Babiana
- Species: B. minuta

Binomial name
- Babiana minuta G.J.Lewis, (1959)

= Babiana minuta =

Species of flowering plant

Babiana minuta is a perennial flowering plant and geophyte belonging to the genus Babiana. The species is endemic to the Northern Cape and the Western Cape.
