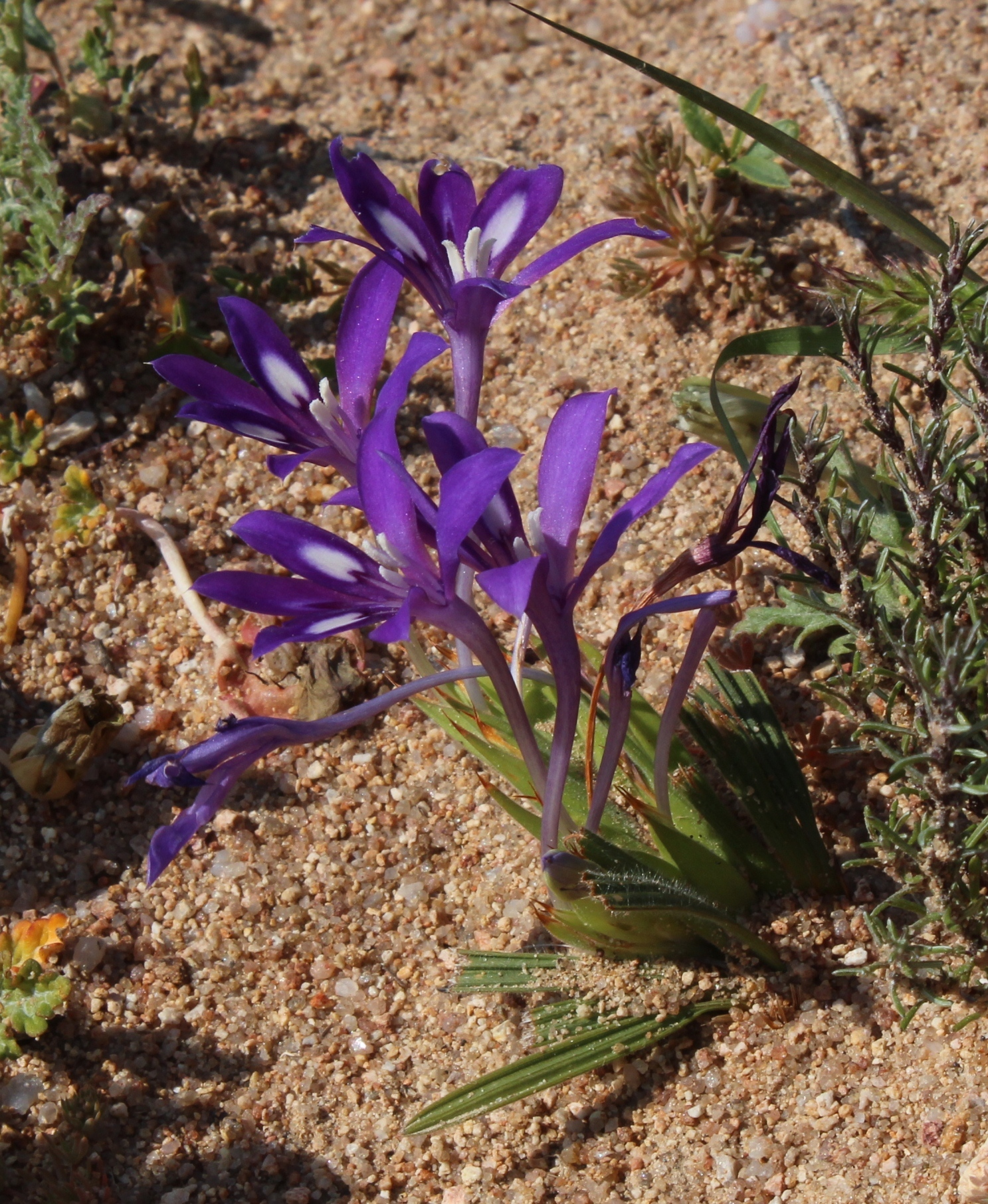

Scientific classification
- Kingdom: Plantae
- Clade: Tracheophytes
- Clade: Angiosperms
- Clade: Monocots
- Order: Asparagales
- Family: Iridaceae
- Genus: Babiana
- Species: B. pubescens

Binomial name
- Babiana pubescens (Lam.) G.J.Lewis, (1954)

Synonyms
- Gladiolus pubescens Lam.

= Babiana pubescens =

Species of flowering plant

Babiana pubescens is a perennial flowering plant and geophyte belonging to the genus Babiana. The species is endemic to the Northern Cape.
