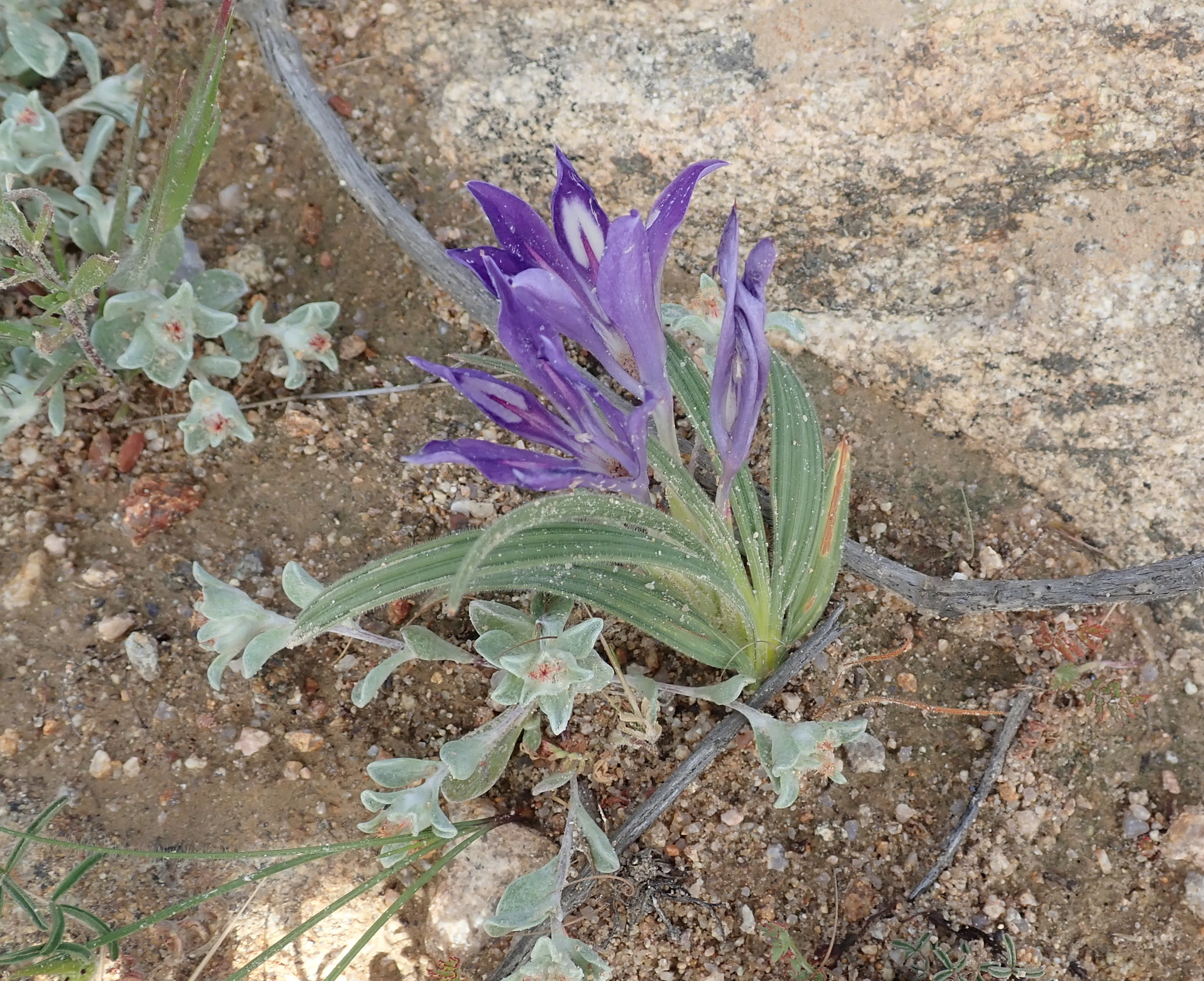

Scientific classification
- Kingdom: Plantae
- Clade: Tracheophytes
- Clade: Angiosperms
- Clade: Monocots
- Order: Asparagales
- Family: Iridaceae
- Genus: Babiana
- Species: B. attenuata

Binomial name
- Babiana attenuata G.J.Lewis, (1959)

= Babiana attenuata =

Species of flowering plant

Babiana attenuata is a perennial flowering plant and geophyte belonging to the genus Babiana and is part of the Succulent Karoo. The species is endemic to the Northern Cape.
