= Babiana unguiculata =

Scientific classification
- Kingdom: Plantae
- Clade: Tracheophytes
- Clade: Angiosperms
- Clade: Monocots
- Order: Asparagales
- Family: Iridaceae
- Genus: Babiana
- Species: B. unguiculata

Binomial name
- Babiana unguiculata G.J.Lewis

Species of flowering plant

Babiana unguiculata is a perennial flowering plant and geophyte belonging to the genus Babiana. The species is endemic to the Northern Cape and the Western Cape. It occurs on the Nardouwberg and Bokkeveldberge escarpment where it is part of the fynbos. There are two subpopulations and it is threatened by the rooibos tea industry.
