= R301 =

R301 may refer to:

- R301 (Morocco)
- R301 road (South Africa)
