= R46 (South Africa) =

Provincial route in South Africa

Provincial route R46

Route information
- Maintained by WCDTPW
- Length: 150 km (93 mi)

Major junctions
- West end: R45 near Malmesbury
- R44 near Hermon; R44 near Gouda; R43 near Wolseley
- East end: N1 near Touws River

Location
- Country: South Africa
- Major cities: Malmesbury, Riebeek-Kasteel, Tulbagh, Ceres, Touws River

Highway system
- Numbered routes of South Africa
← R45	→ R48

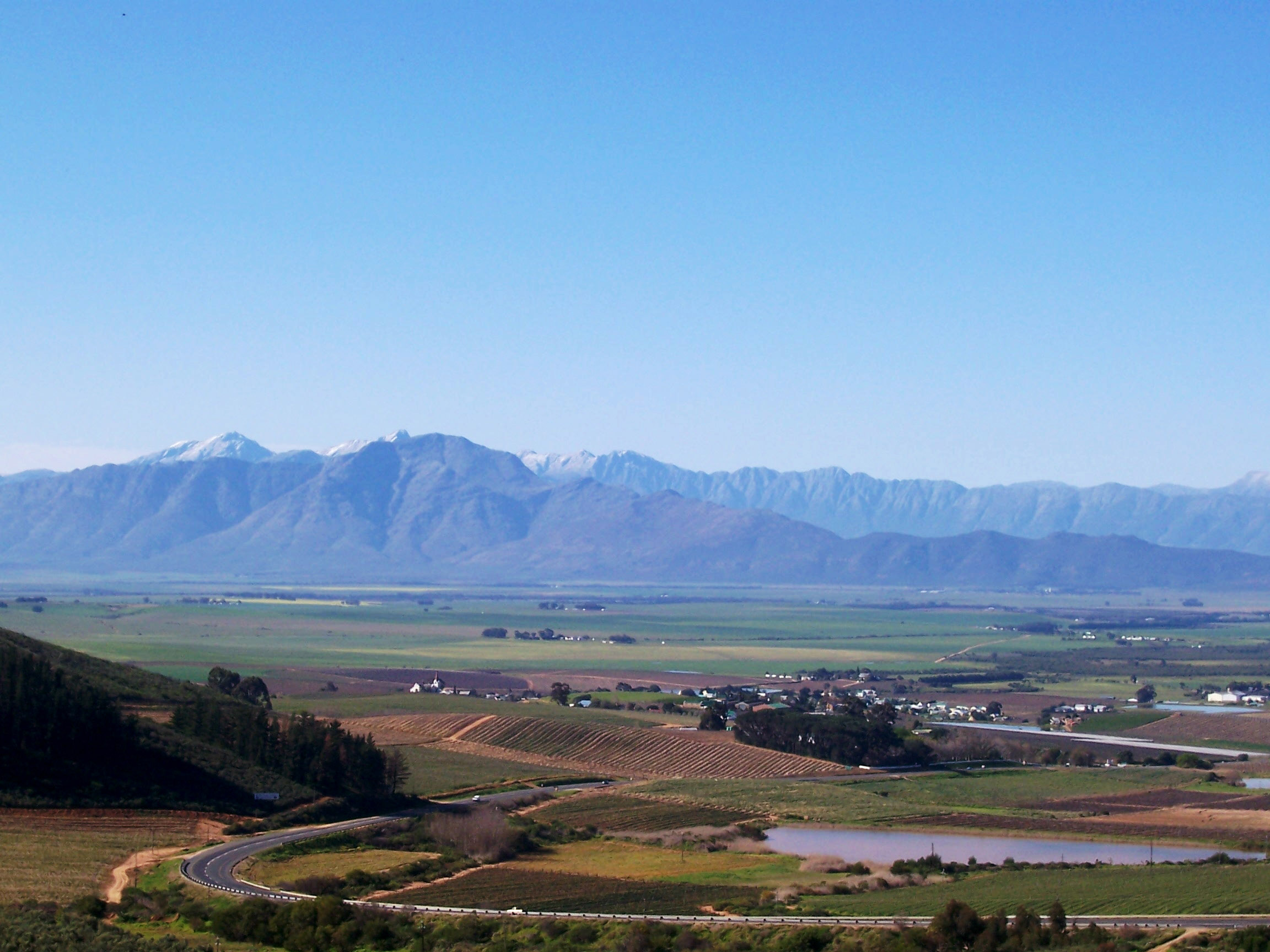
The R46 between Riebeek-Kasteel and Malmesbury

The R46 is a provincial route in Western Cape, South Africa that connects Malmesbury with Touws River, via Riebeek-Kasteel, Tulbagh and Ceres. The R46 is co-signed with the R44 between Gouda and Hermon in the Berg River valley.

== Route ==
The R46 begins at a junction with the R45 road about 4 kilometres east of Malmesbury. It begins by heading east-north-east for 15 kilometres to Riebeek-Kasteel, where it meets the southern terminus of the R311 road (which provides access to the town centre). The R46 proceeds south-east for 10 kilometres to cross the Berg River and reach a T-junction with the R44 route in the town of Hermon.

The R46 joins the R44 and they are one road north-east for 17 kilometres, bypassing the Voëlvlei Dam, to reach the town of Gouda, where the R44 becomes its own road northwards while the R46 bends east-south-eastwards. The R46 heads south-east for 31 kilometres, passing to the south of Tulbagh and to the north of Wolseley, to enter the Winterhoek Mountain Catchment Area and meet the northern terminus of the R43 route. The R46 proceeds north-east for another 10 kilometres as the Michell's Pass to enter the town of Ceres, where it meets the southern terminus of the R303 route.

From Ceres, the R46 heads east-north-east for 40 kilometres to meet the southern terminus of the R355 route. The R46 turns to the south-east and heads for 31 kilometres to reach its end at a junction with the N1 national route approximately 8 kilometres west of Touws River.

Detailed Route
