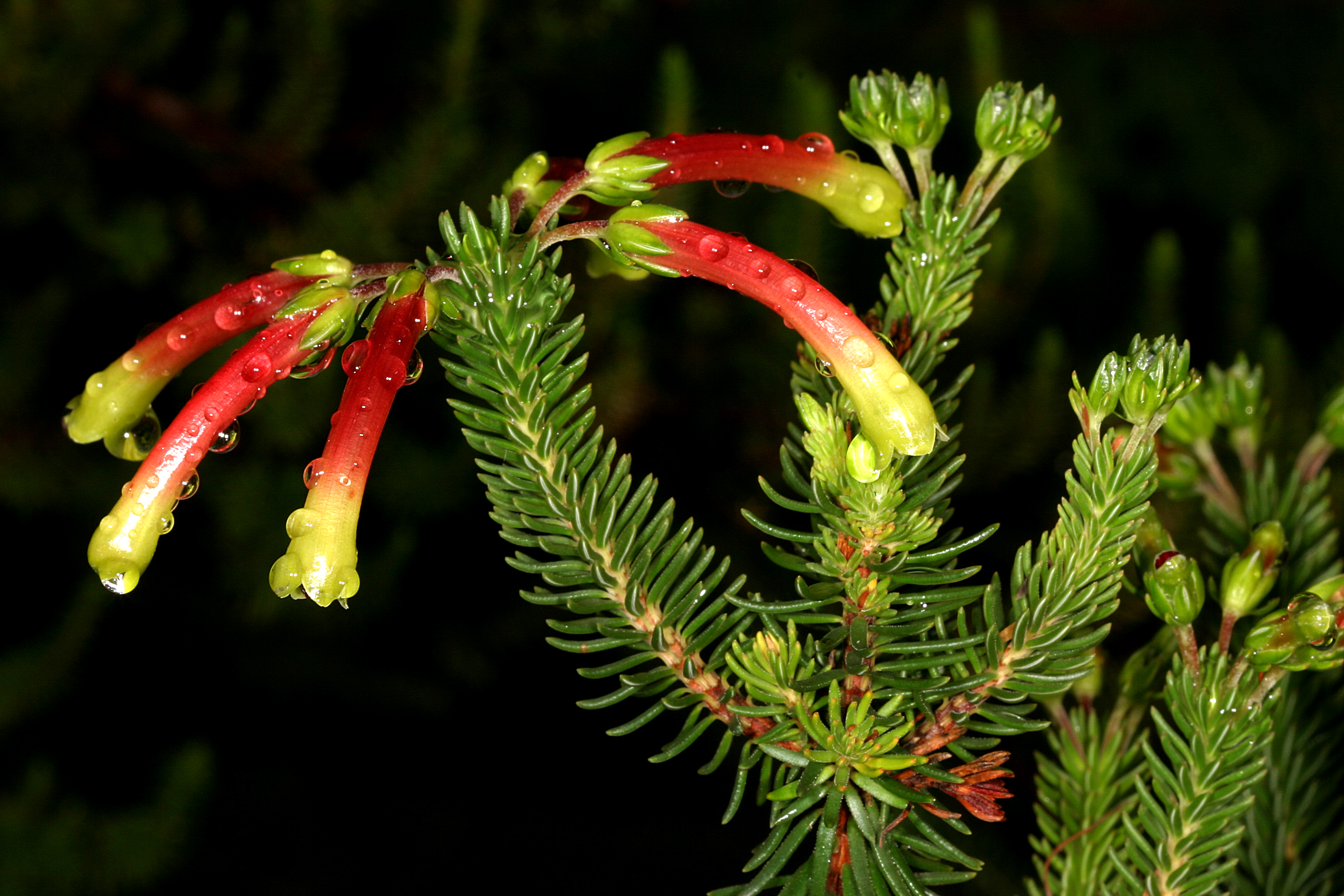

Scientific classification
- Kingdom: Plantae
- Clade: Tracheophytes
- Clade: Angiosperms
- Clade: Eudicots
- Clade: Asterids
- Order: Ericales
- Family: Ericaceae
- Genus: Erica
- Species: E. hibbertia

Binomial name
- Erica hibbertia Andrews

= Erica hibbertia =

Species of flowering plant

Erica hibbertia is a plant belonging to the genus Erica and forming part of the fynbos. The species is endemic to the Western Cape and occurs from the Franschhoek Pass to the Stettynsberge. The range is 69 km² and there are only three segmented subpopulations with less than 50 plants. Population reduction due to invasive plants and road construction activities has caused the plants to decline in numbers at the Franschhoek Pass.
