= R43 (South Africa) =

Provincial route in South Africa

Provincial route R43

Route information
- Maintained by WCDTPW
- Length: 283 km (176 mi)

Major junctions
- North end: R46 near Wolseley
- N1 near Worcester; R60 in Worcester; R45 in Villiersdorp; N2 on Langhoogte Pass; N2 near Botrivier; R44 near Kleinmond
- South end: Die Dam southeast of Gansbaai

Location
- Country: South Africa
- Major cities: Ceres, Worcester, Villiersdorp, Botrivier, Hermanus, Stanford, Gansbaai

Highway system
- Numbered routes of South Africa
← R42	→ R44

The R43 is a provincial route in the Western Cape province of South Africa which connects Ceres with Gansbaai via Worcester, Botrivier and Hermanus. It is co-signed with the N2 for nine kilometres near Botrivier.

== Route ==
Detailed Route

The R43 begins at a T-junction on the R46 between Ceres and Wolseley, situated at the southwestern entrance to Michell's Pass. It runs southwards for 39 kilometres, following the Breede River, to reach Worcester, where it cosigns with the N1 eastwards for a kilometre before heading southwards through the town centre.

From Worcester, it heads south for 50 kilometres, bypassing the Brandvlei Dam, to Villiersdorp, where it meets the south-eastern terminus of the R45. It continues southwards for 30 kilometres to meet the N2 at a T-junction. The R43 joins the N2 westwards for 9 kilometers to Botrivier, where it splits from the N2 and continues southwards for 9 kilometres, following the Bot River and bypassing the Hottentots Holland Mountains, to meet the southern terminus of the R44. The R43 continues southwards to reach the coast at Bot River Lagoon before turning eastwards at Hawston to follow the coast to Hermanus, passing through Vermont, Onrusrivier and Sandbaai.

From Hermanus, the route continues eastwards, bypassing the Klein River Lagoon, to reach Stanford, where it turns to the south again, meeting the coast at Gansbaai. From Gansbaai, it continues east-south-east along the coast, bypassing Hydra Bay and Pearly Beach, to end in open countryside at Die Dam, close to the entrance to the Quoin Point section of the Walker Bay Nature Reserve.
