= R44 (South Africa) =

Provincial route in South Africa

Provincial route R44

Route information
- Maintained by WCDTPW
- Length: 230 km (140 mi)

Major junctions
- North end: N7 in Piketberg
- R46 near Gouda; R46 near Hermon; R45 near Wellington; N1 near Klapmuts; N2 in Somerset West
- South end: R43 near Kleinmond

Location
- Country: South Africa
- Major cities: Piketberg, Porterville, Wellington, Stellenbosch, Somerset West, Strand, Gordon's Bay, Kleinmond

Highway system
- Numbered routes of South Africa
← R43	→ R45

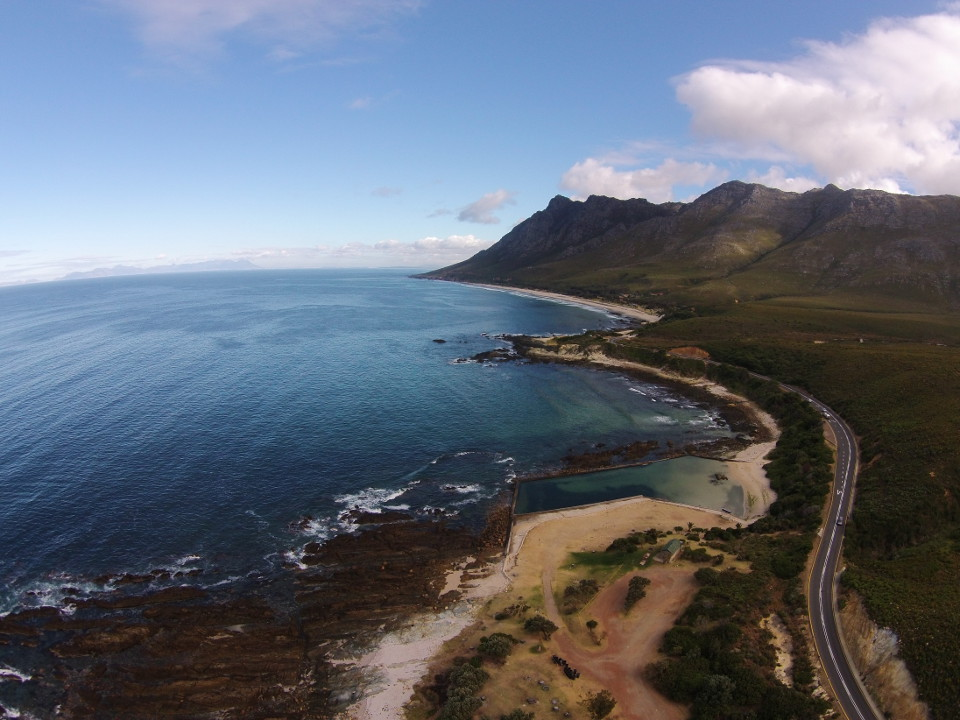
An aerial photograph of the R44 with a view of the Kogel Bay Resort located between Gordon’s Bay and Rooi Els in the foreground.

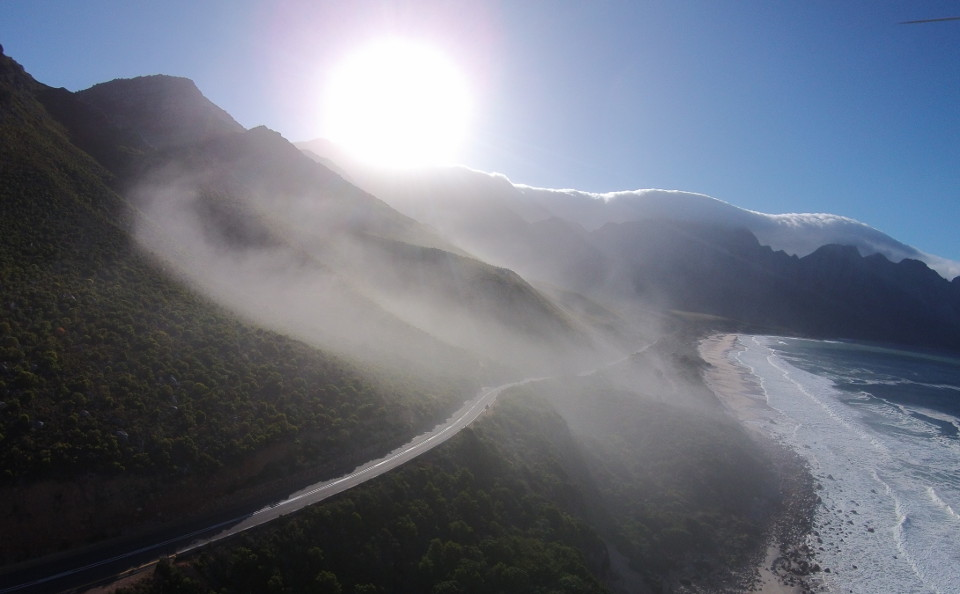
An aerial photograph of the R44.

The R44 is a provincial route in Western Cape, South Africa that connects Piketberg with Kleinmond via Wellington, Stellenbosch, Somerset West and Strand. The coastal section between Kleinmond and Gordon's Bay is a very scenic ocean drive. The section between Gordon's Bay and Stellenbosch via Strand and Somerset West is a dual carriageway. The R44 is co-signed with the R46 between Gouda and Hermon in the Berg River valley.

== Route ==
Detailed Route

The R44 begins in Piketberg at a roundabout junction with the N7 national route and the R365 road. It begins by heading east-south-east as Kerk Street to leave the town. It heads for 24 kilometres to the town of Porterville, where it turns to the south and passes through the town before heading another 35 kilometres, bypassing Saron, to reach the town of Gouda.

Just after Gouda, the R44 reaches a T-junction with the R46 road and joins it to be co-signed south-west for 17 kilometres to the town of Hermon, where the R46 becomes its own road north-west while the R44 turns to the south. The R44 heads southwards for 23 kilometres to pass through the western part of the town of Wellington, where it turns west as Champagne Street, crosses the Berg River and reaches a junction with the R45 road.

The R44 continues south-south-west for 20 kilometres to cross the N1 highway and reach a junction with the R101 road (Old Paarl Road) at the town of Klapmuts. The R44 continues southwards for 15 kilometres, becoming Adam Tas Street, to enter the town of Stellenbosch, where it is joined by the R310 route to be co-signed on Adam Tas Street through the western side of the town centre, where they meet the south-eastern terminus of the R304 road. After co-signing for 2 kilometres, the R310 becomes Adam Tas Street westwards while the R44 remains heading southwards as Strand Street, crossing the Eerste River.

From Stellenbosch, the R44 heads southwards for 16 kilometres, becoming Broadway Boulevard and entering the Helderberg region of the City of Cape Town, to pass through the western part of the town of Somerset West, where it reaches a junction with the M9 metropolitan route west of the town centre. It proceeds southwards to cross the R102 road (Old Main Road) and the N2 highway, bypass the Somerset Mall and enter the town of Strand, where it passes through in a south-easterly direction. At the junction with the M153 metropolitan route (Main Road), the R44 leaves Broadway Boulevard to become Main Road towards the south-west and enter the Strand CBD. After a kilometre, the R44 becomes Gordon's Bay Drive towards the south-east to follow the False Bay coastline.

The R44 heads south-east for 5 kilometres as Gordon's Bay Drive, then as Faure Marine Drive, to pass through the CBD of Gordon's Bay. It then leaves the town in a southerly direction, following the False Bay coastline for 28 kilometres to reach Pringle Bay, where it turns to the east. It follows the coast eastwards for 18 kilometres as Clarence Drive, through Betty's Bay, to pass through the town of Kleinmond as Main Road. It then heads eastwards for 12 kilometres to reach its end at a junction with the R43 road in the Hottentots Holland Mountain Catchment Area about 9 kilometres south of Botrivier.
