= R45 (South Africa) =

Road in South Africa

Provincial route R45
- R45 route map

Route information
- Maintained by WCDTPW
- Length: 209 km (130 mi)

Major junctions
- Northwest end: Main Road in Saldanha
- R27 near Langebaanweg; N7 near Malmesbury; R46 near Malmesbury; R44 near Wellington; N1 in Paarl
- Southeast end: R43 in Villiersdorp

Location
- Country: South Africa
- Towns: Saldanha, Vredenburg, Hopefield, Malmesbury, Paarl, Franschhoek, Villiersdorp

Highway system
- Numbered routes of South Africa
← R44	→ R46

The R45 is a provincial route in Western Cape, South Africa that connects Saldanha with Villiersdorp via Vredenburg, Malmesbury and Paarl. The route is mostly a two-lane wide-shouldered highway, however sections within Paarl and between Vredenburg and Saldanha are dual-carriageways.

== Route ==
The north-western terminus of the R45 is in Saldanha on the West Coast. The route initially heads north-north-east for twelve kilometres to Vredenburg. Here, it reaches a four-way intersection where the straight road becomes the R399 and the road to the left heads north-west to Paternoster, with the R45 becoming the road to the right. Exiting Vredenburg to the east-south-east, the R45 runs for nine kilometres before crossing the R27. After another seven kilometres, the route passes through Langebaanweg. Running 22 kilometres further on, the route passes through Hopefield. After another 14 kilometres, the R311 branches off to the left, heading east to Moorreesburg. The next intersection, after ten kilometres, is with the R307, branching to the south-west to Darling. The R45 continues for a further 31 kilometres to cross the N7.

The R45 then continues south-east for 5 kilometres as the Malmesbury northern bypass (opened in March 2026) to pass north of the town of Malmesbury and reach a junction with the R46 (which connects to Riebeek-Kasteel) east of Malmesbury. The R45 veers south-east, running for 30 kilometres to intersect with the R44 west of Wellington.

It then runs south for five kilometres, following the Berg River, to reach a T-junction with a north–south road, where the R45 becomes the road southwards towards Paarl. Entering Paarl from the north as Main Road, it reaches a junction with Lady Grey Street, where it becomes Lady Grey Street westwards before becoming Main Road southwards at the next junction. Continuing for another kilometre, it meets the R101 in the Paarl CBD. The R101 joins the R45 southwards for five kilometres to exit Paarl and interchange with the N1 before reaching a junction, where the R101 turns westwards and the R45 becomes its own road southwards as Huguenot Road, still following the Berg River.

After ten kilometres, the R310 is given off to the right (south-west), heading to Pniel and Stellenbosch. The R45 then veers east, reaching Wemmershoek. Here, it crosses the Berg River (no-longer parallel) and meets the southern terminus of the R301 (Wemmershoek Road; also coming from Paarl). Continuing east, it passes through Franschhoek after six kilometres. The R45 makes a left turn (east) to become the Franschhoek Pass, passing east and south around the Hottentots Holland Mountain Catchment Area. After 28 kilometres, it meets the north-eastern terminus of the R321 coming from Grabouw at a T-junction adjacent to the Theewaterskloof Dam. The R45 turns to the east here, heading for eight kilometres to reach its end at a T-junction with the R43 in Villiersdorp.
