= Ceres Transport Riders' Museum =

Ceres Transport Riders’ Museum
- Ceres Togryers Museum
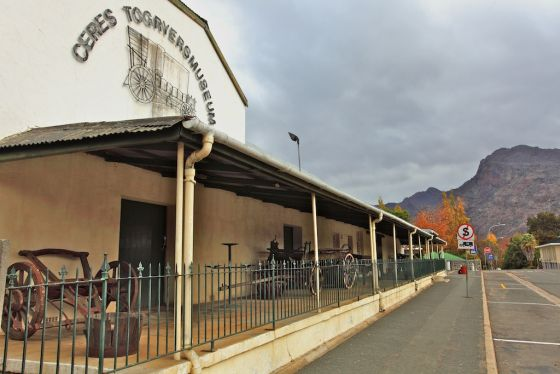
- The Museum
- Established: 7 November 1978
- Location: 8 Oranje Street, Ceres (Cape Winelands District Municipality), Western Cape, South Africa
- Coordinates: 33°22′6.08″S 19°18′37.42″E
- Type: Transport and Local History Museum
- Curator: Bertdene Laubscher (Museum Manager)
- Owner: Board of Trustees
- Parking: Oranje Street
- Website: www.ceresmuseum.co.za

The Ceres Transport Riders' Museum, more commonly known by its Afrikaans name Ceres Togryers Museum, was started during the 1970s by members of the community of Ceres, South Africa who were interested in preserving the heritage of the town. It was proclaimed a local museum on 7 November 1978 and established as a province-aided museum with effect from 1 April 1987. The Board of Trustees is the governing body of the museum with powers vested in it by the Government of the Western Cape Province under the terms of the Cape Museum Ordinance and is responsible for the institution, its policies, its operational continuity and well-being, and the assets which it holds in trust for the people of Ceres, to whom it is ultimately accountable.

The building in which the museum is housed was built as a flour mill during the early 1930s. The structure of the building was changed somewhat to accommodate the design by well-known Cape Town heritage architect Gawie Fagan.

== The Museum ==
The name "Togryers Museum" or Transport Riders’ Museum originated from the huge influence that the transport riders had on the development of Ceres. The completion of Michell's Pass in 1848 made the town accessible to wagons, and one of the main routes to the diamond fields in Kimberley went through Ceres.

=== Themes ===
The museum houses the following exhibitions:

- Natural history of the Ceres area
- Establishment of Ceres and the lifestyles of its first inhabitants.
- The Transport Riders and their lifestyle
- Photographs and articles on the destructive earthquake of 1969,
- A collection of wagons from the area,
- Local History, including development of schools and churches
- The Slave Uprising at Houdenbek Farm
- Apartheid era forced removals during the 1960s and impacts on the local community

=== Other activities and services ===
- Assistance with family/genealogical research
- Educational programmes for primary and secondary schools
- Outreach programmes to the youth and elderly
- Guided tours of the museum
- Historic information to the public for school assignments

== Awards ==
In the 2025 Western Cape Cultural Awards, the "Togryers Museum" was named as the winner in the category "Contribution to the Promotion of Social Inclusion in the Field of Museums, Heritage and Geographical Names".

== Gallery ==
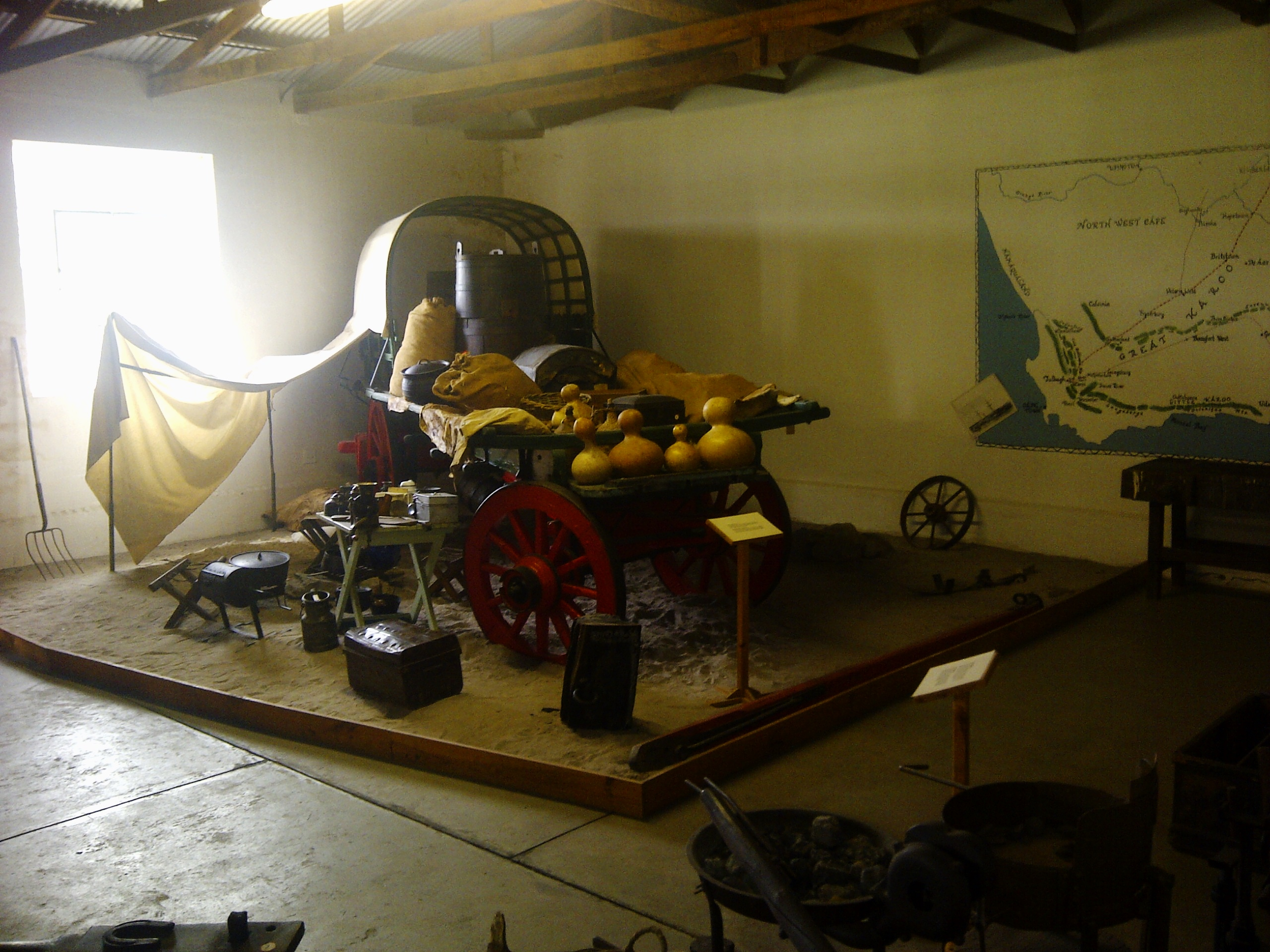

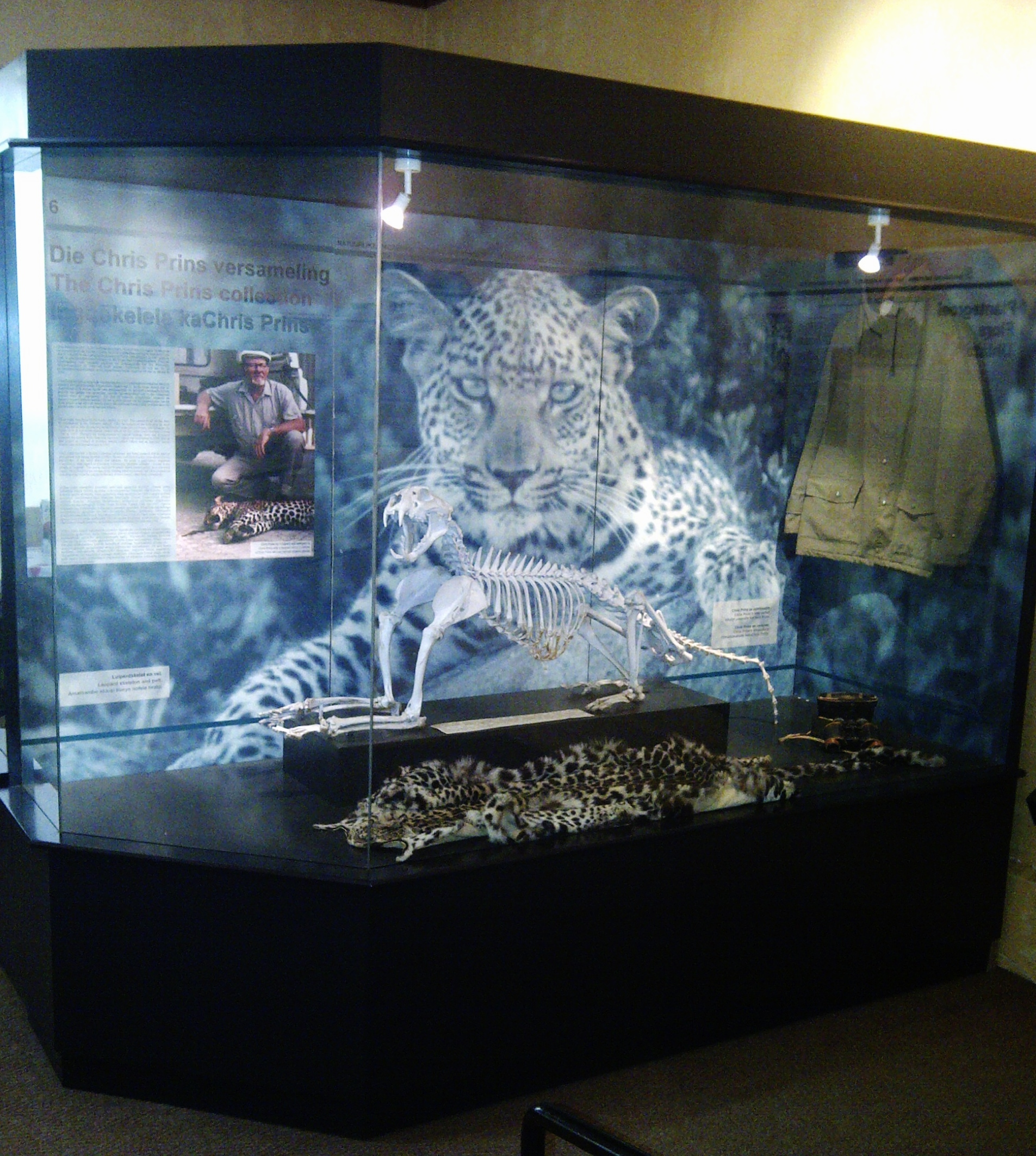

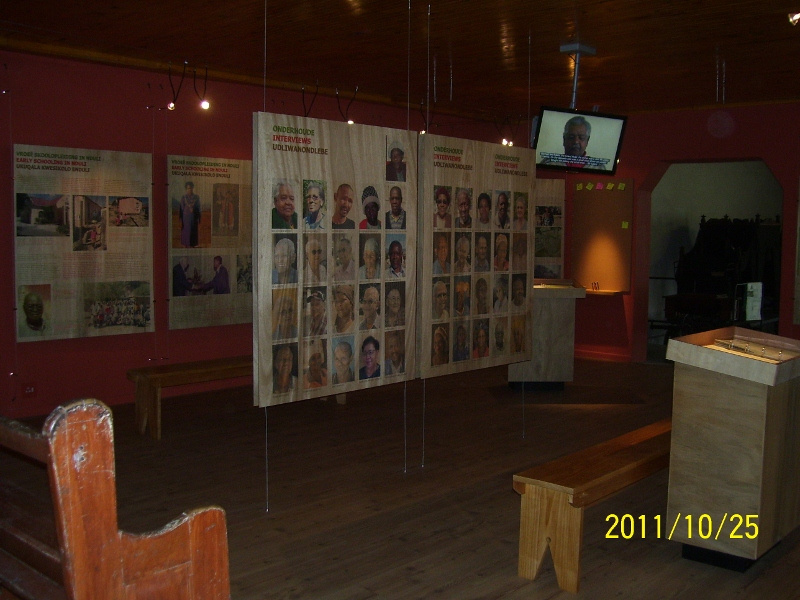

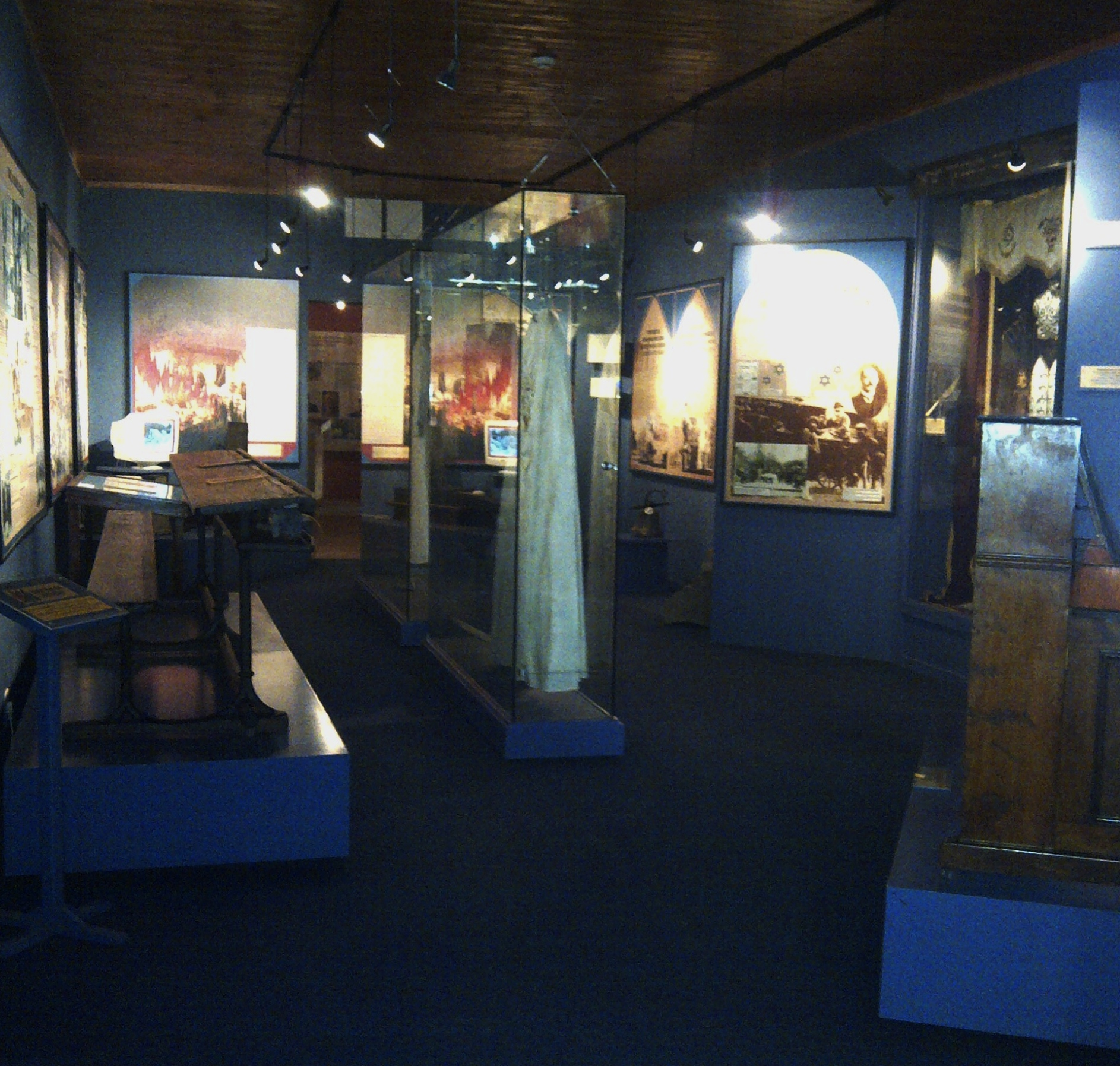

== See also ==
- Transport museum
- Ox-wagon
- Cape cart
- Andrew Geddes Bain
- Ceres
