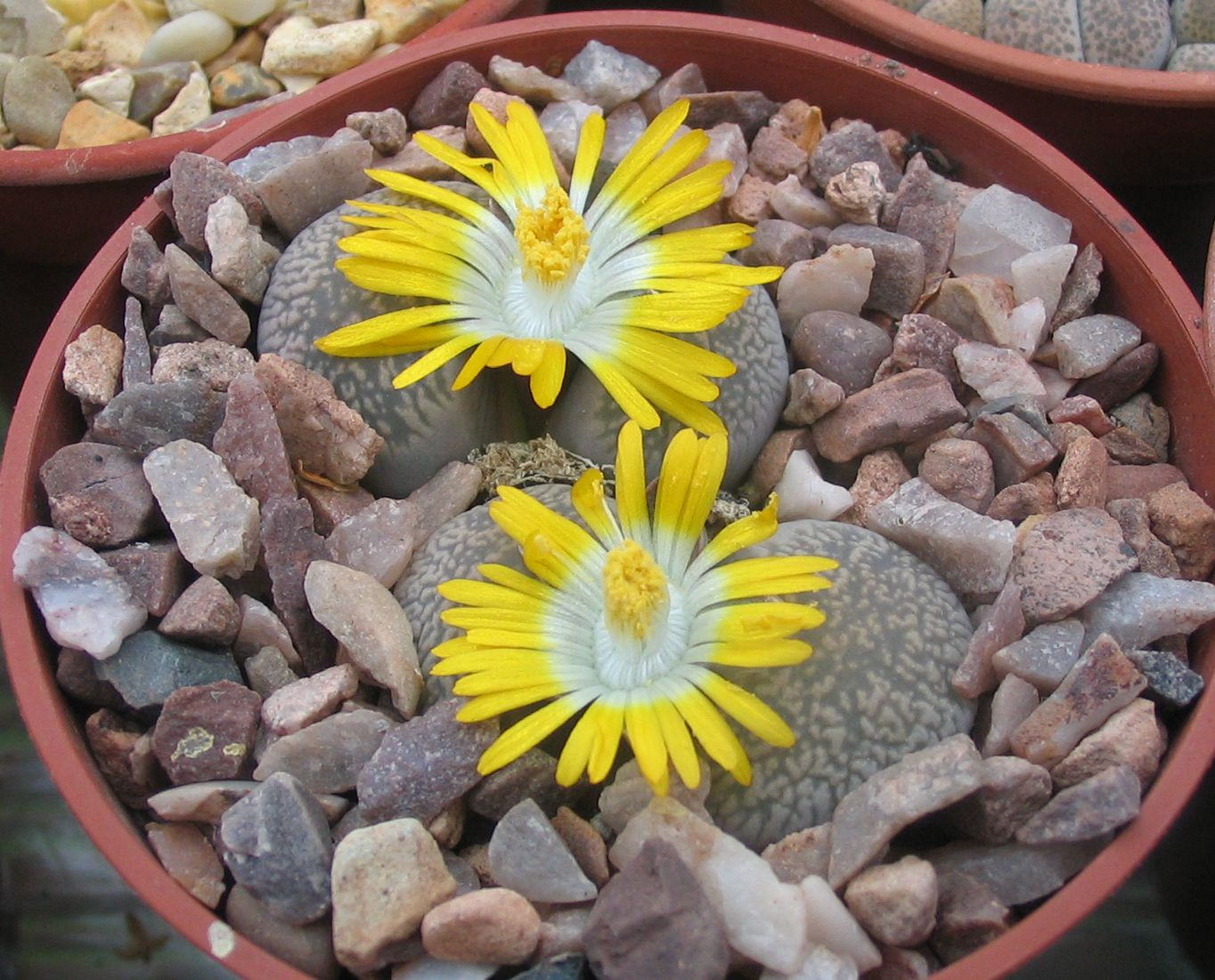
- Lithops comptonii in cultivation

Scientific classification
- Kingdom: Plantae
- Clade: Tracheophytes
- Clade: Angiosperms
- Clade: Eudicots
- Order: Caryophyllales
- Family: Aizoaceae
- Genus: Lithops
- Species: L. comptonii

Binomial name
- Lithops comptonii L.Bolus

Synonyms
- Lithops weberi Nel

= Lithops comptonii =

Species of succulent

Lithops comptonii is a species of plant in the family Aizoaceae, indigenous to South Africa.

== Distribution ==
Lithops comptonii is naturally found in the far southwest of South Africa, in an arid inland region of the Western Cape Province. The furthest southwest of any Lithops species, this range includes the Karoo areas north east of the town of Ceres. This dry area is subject to a winter-rainfall climate.

== Cultivation ==
It is sometimes used as a houseplant or for landscaping. Like all Lithops, it requires extremely well-drained soil. Like all Lithops it also grows in annual cycles, as the leaf-pairs flower, and then each produces a new leaf-pair that replaces the old one (which shrivels away). The principal rule of watering is that Lithops should be kept dry from when they finish flowering, up until the old leaf-pairs are fully replaced.

Of the Lithops species, L. comptonii is one of the few which is adapted to a predominantly winter-rainfall climate (together with Lithops viridis, Lithops divergens, Lithops meyeri and Lithops helmutii).
