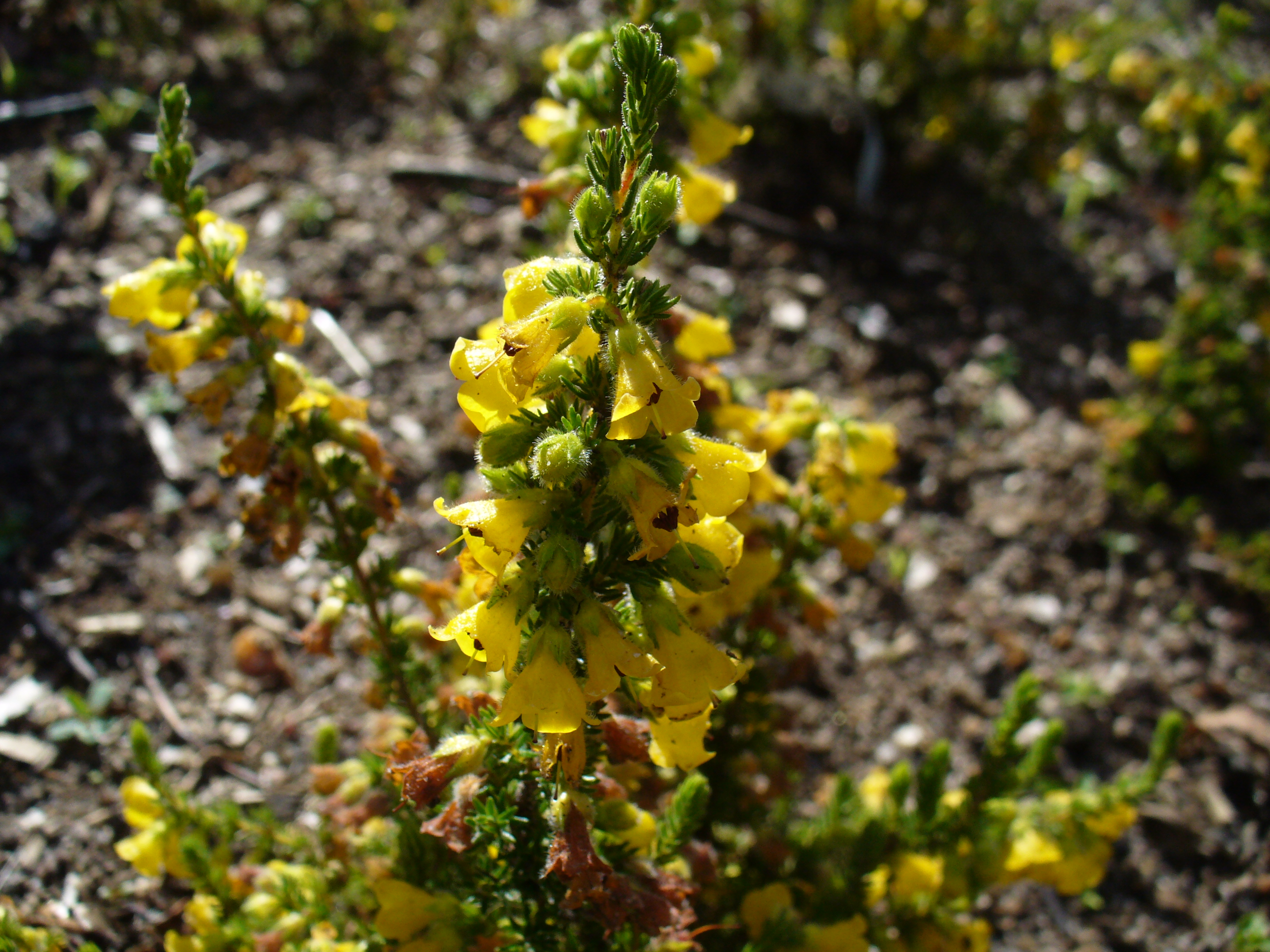

Scientific classification
- Kingdom: Plantae
- Clade: Tracheophytes
- Clade: Angiosperms
- Clade: Eudicots
- Clade: Asterids
- Order: Ericales
- Family: Ericaceae
- Genus: Erica
- Species: E. chrysocodon

Binomial name
- Erica chrysocodon Guthrie & Bolus

= Erica chrysocodon =

Species of flowering plant

Erica chrysocodon is a plant belonging to the genus Erica and forming part of the fynbos. The species is endemic to the Western Cape with one population at the Franschhoek Pass. The swampy habitat is threatened by invasive plants.
