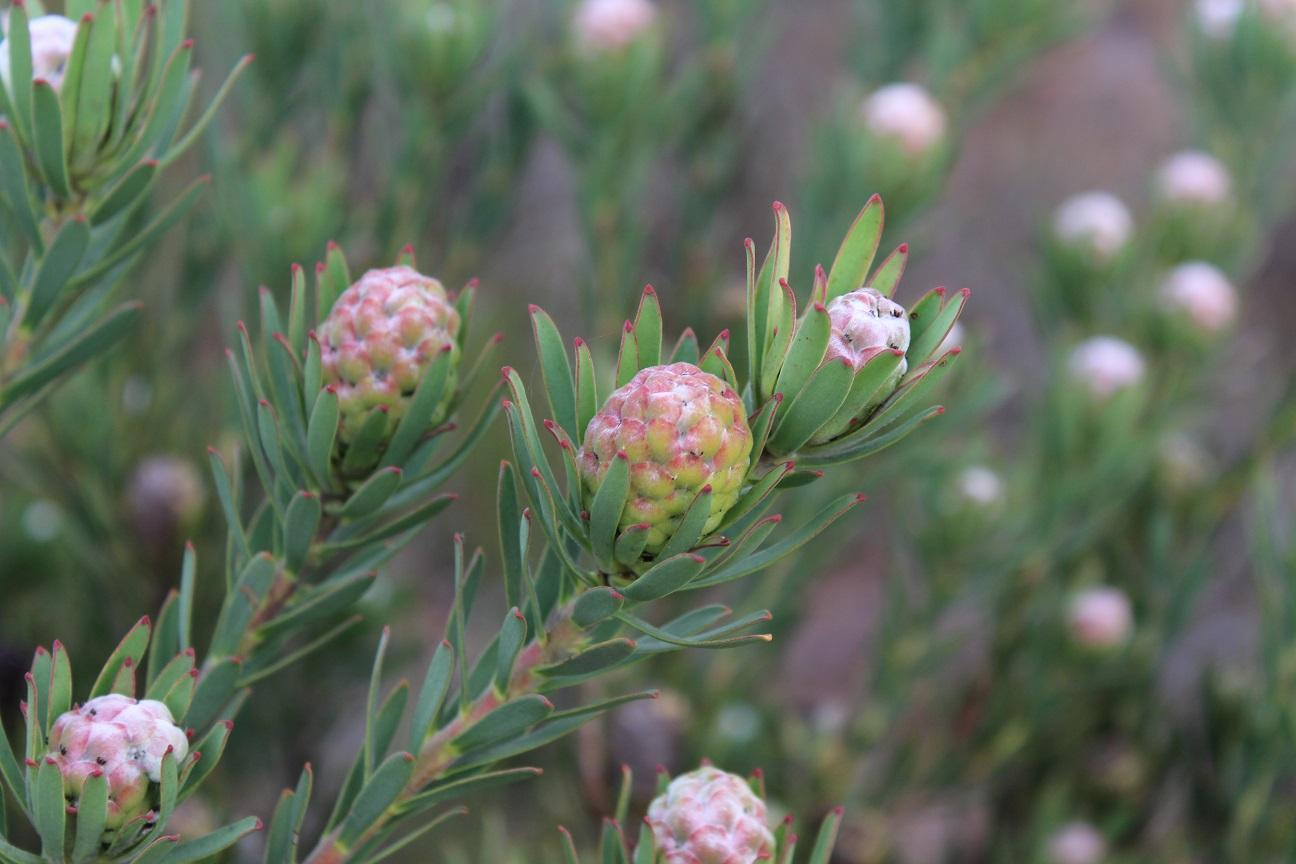

Conservation status
- Critically Endangered (IUCN 3.1)

Scientific classification
- Kingdom: Plantae
- Clade: Tracheophytes
- Clade: Angiosperms
- Clade: Eudicots
- Order: Proteales
- Family: Proteaceae
- Genus: Leucadendron
- Species: L. lanigerum
- Variety: L. l. var. laevigatum

Trinomial name
- Leucadendron lanigerum var. laevigatum Meisn.

= Leucadendron lanigerum var. laevigatum =

Variety of plant

Leucadendron lanigerum var. laevigatum, the Worcester shale conebush, is a flowering shrub and variety of Leucadendron lanigerum, belonging to the genus Leucadendron and forming part of the fynbos biome. The species is endemic to the Western Cape where it occurs in the Breede River valley from Tulbagh to Wolseley. The plant has an area of occurrence of 171 km² and has already lost 80% of its habitat to the establishment of vineyards with 20% of the loss since 1990. The shrub grows to a height of 1.6 m and dies after burning but the seeds survive. The shrub flowers from July to September. The seeds are stored in a tolbo on the female plant, fall to the ground after burning and are dispersed by the wind, the seeds have wings. The plant is unisexual and there are separate plants with male and female flowers and are pollinated by small beetles. The shrub grows in level clay soil at an altitude of 300 m.
