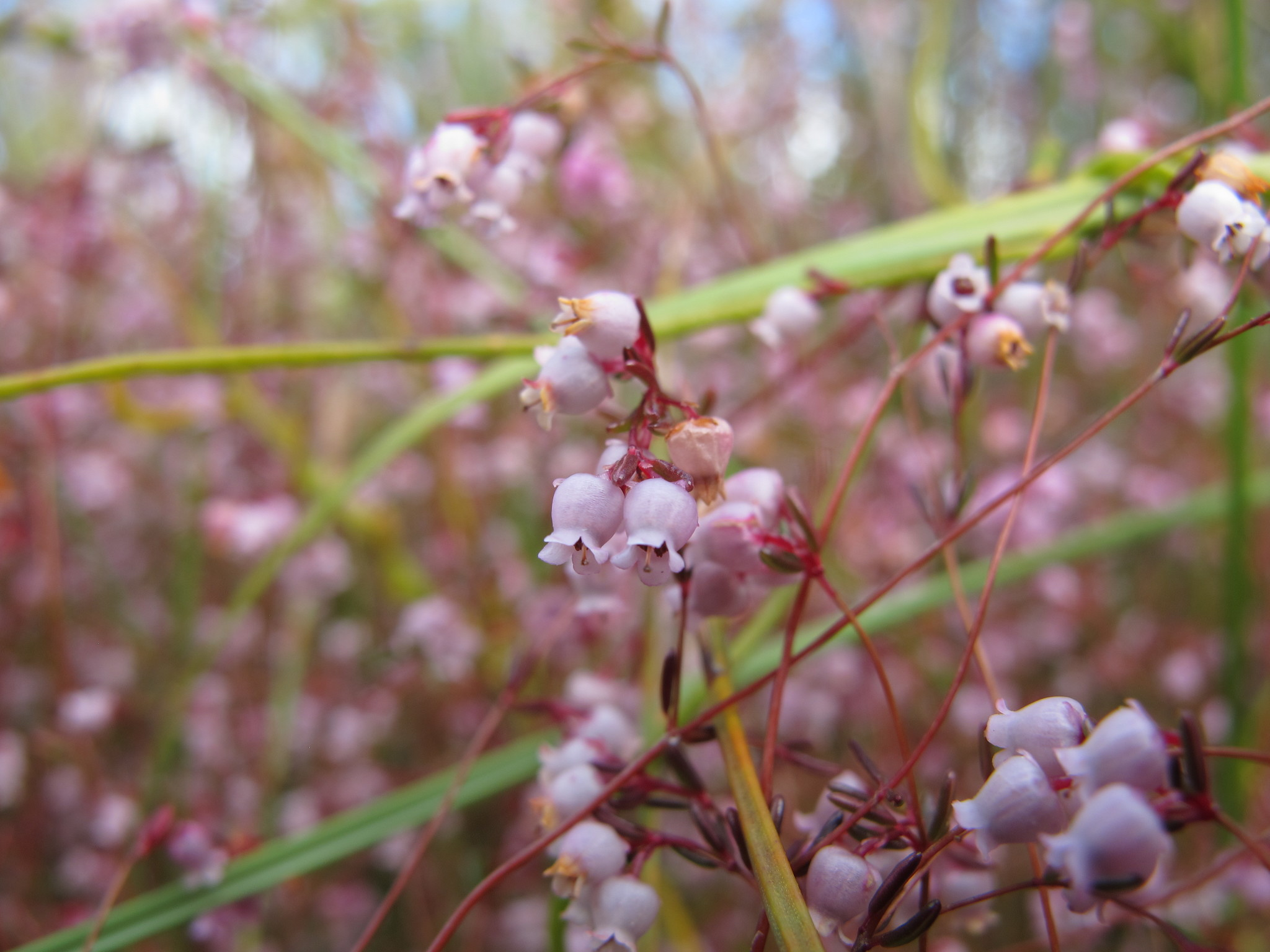

Scientific classification
- Kingdom: Plantae
- Clade: Tracheophytes
- Clade: Angiosperms
- Clade: Eudicots
- Clade: Asterids
- Order: Ericales
- Family: Ericaceae
- Genus: Erica
- Species: E. bakeri

Binomial name
- Erica bakeri T.M.Salter (1956)

= Erica bakeri =

Species of flowering plant

Erica bakeri, the Wemmershoek marsh heath, is a plant that belongs to the genus Erica and forms part of the fynbos. The species is endemic to the Western Cape where it occurs in the Wemmershoek marsh. During the 1990s, fewer than 50 plants were identified, but a survey in 2008 found no plants. The plant may still be saved if invasive plants are eradicated and the area is better managed, as some critically endangered species occur here.
