= Rademan =

Rademan is a surname. Notable people with the surname include:

- Lefébre Rademan (born 1996), South African netball player
- Simon Rademan (born 1964), South African fashion designer and stylist

== See also ==
- Rademann
