= Xanthoparmelia acrita =

Scientific classification
- Kingdom: Fungi
- Division: Ascomycota
- Class: Lecanoromycetes
- Order: Lecanorales
- Family: Parmeliaceae
- Genus: Xanthoparmelia
- Species: X. acrita

Binomial name
- Xanthoparmelia acrita M.D.E.Knox & Hale (1986)

Species of lichen

Xanthoparmelia acrita is a species of terricolous (ground-dwelling), foliose lichen in the family Parmeliaceae. Found in the Cape Province of South Africa, it was formally described as a new species in 1986 by the American lichenologists David Knox and Mason Hale. The type specimen was collected in the Ceres Mountain Fynbos Nature Reserve at Michell's Pass, at an elevation of 600 m (2,000 ft); there, it was found growing on the soil on low sandstone ledges. Characteristics of the species include its weakly convoluted lobes, and the presence of the secondary metabolites (lichen products) fumarprotocetraric acid and usnic acid

== See also ==
- List of Xanthoparmelia species
