= De Hollandsche Molen, South Africa =

De Hollandsche Molen
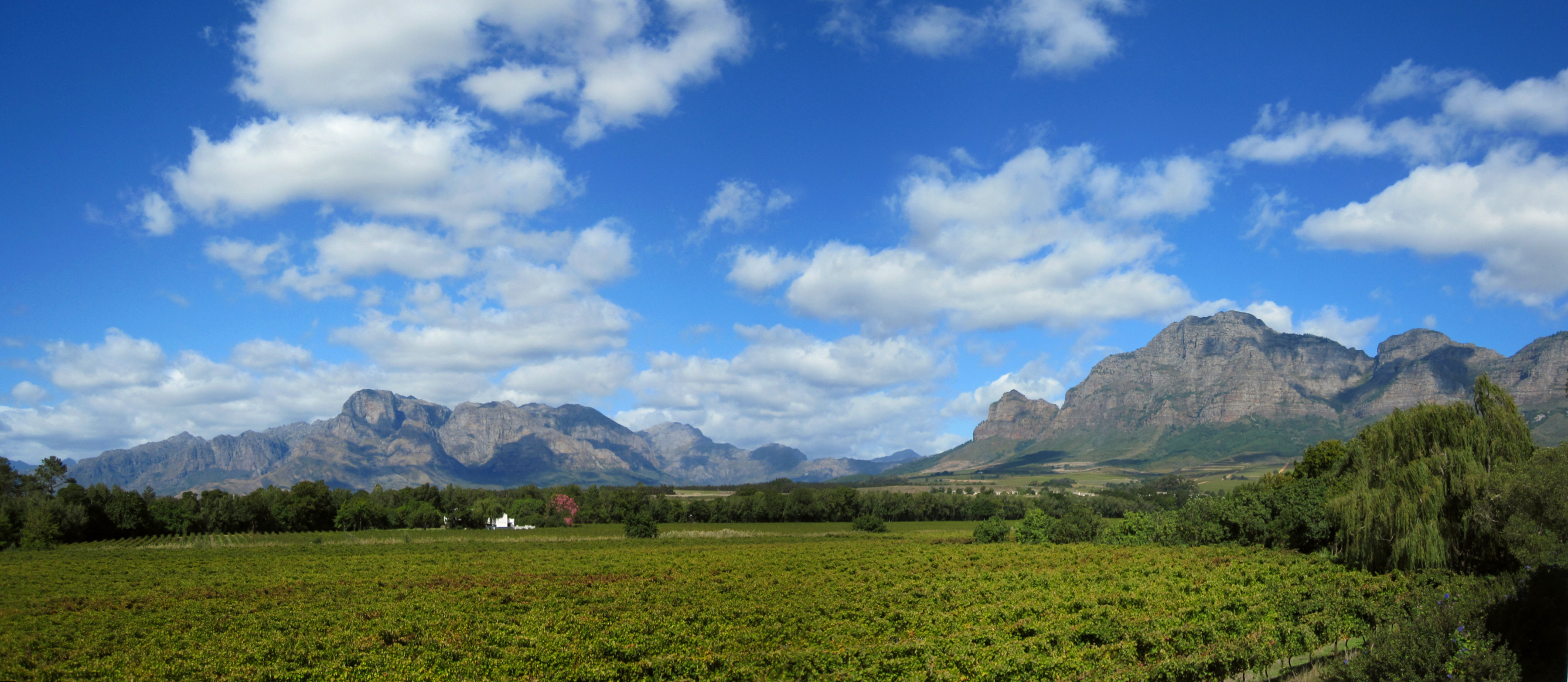
- The surrounding area, looking towards De Hollandsche Molen.

- Location within Western Cape Location within South Africa
- Coordinates: 33°51′30″S 19°02′18″E
- Country: South Africa
- Province: Western Cape
- District: Cape Winelands
- Municipality: Stellenbosch
- Established: 1937

Population
  - Total: 192

Ethnicities (2011)
  - White: 95.8%
  - Coloured: 3.1%
  - Black African: 1.0%

First Languages (2011)
  - Afrikaans: 66.2%
  - English: 33.9%
- Time zone: UTC+2 (SAST)

De Hollandsche Molen is a small resort town in the Western Cape province in South Africa. The settlement is situated next to the Wemmershoek River about 2 km north of Wemmershoek and about 9 km north-west of Franschhoek.

== History ==
The history of the town started in the early 1900s when the Diepering family from the Netherlands purchased the piece of land where the settlement stands today. The settlement was officially established in 1937.It was then purchased by the Robinson family in 1980.The Du Plooy family purchased the resort in 1988.

== Naming ==
The town's name is from Dutch meaning Holland's mill from Hollandsche Holland's or of Holland and molen meaning mill from the number of flour mills in the area and surrounding it.
