= SAS: Are You Tough Enough? =

- Genre: Reality television
- Presented by: Dermot O'Leary
- Theme music composer: Christian Henson
- Country of origin: United Kingdom
- Original language: English
- No. of series: 3
- No. of episodes: 18

Production
- Running time: 60 minutes

Original release
- Network: BBC Two
- Release: 3 March 2002 – 21 March 2004

SAS: Are You Tough Enough? was a British television documentary series produced from 2002 to 2004 exposing volunteer members of the public to the experience of the British Army's Special Air Service's selection process. It was presented by Dermot O'Leary.

There were three series aired on BBC Two: the original in the Scottish Highlands, the SAS Jungle in Borneo (Batang-Ai in Sarawak, Malaysia), and SAS Desert in Namibia's Skeleton Coast. In March 2004, it was reported that the series had been axed due to poor ratings and high production costs; this was two weeks before filming of a fourth series, SAS Ice in Norway, was due to begin.

== Format ==
In contrast to the real SAS selection policy of the time, the programme also featured female candidates. As with real selection, initially the candidates were pushed to the limits to reduce the numbers, with survivors in the latter stages, trained and assessed in a variety of military training exercises.

The contestants participated in exercises experienced in the real selection process, although over a shorter time frame, with the winner only getting a hand-shake from the SAS SSgt (Ret) Eddie Stone. For realism, exercises were controlled by ex-members of the SAS, notably Staff Sergeant Eddie Stone and John McAleese with additional comments about what would happen in the real process from other ex-SAS members.

== Series 1 (Highlands) ==
In the first series, the exercises included:

- The Fan Dance over Ben Lomond — five eliminated
- The Long Drag (a 40 mile trek with a 55 lb bergen to be completed in 20 hours) — eight eliminated, including four for medical reasons and one for cheating
- Escape and evasion, with a resulting interrogation test — six eliminated
- Fitness test
- Swimming test (fully clothed in combat gear) — two eliminated
- Survival
- Free fall parachuting
- Navigation
- Off road driving in a Land Rover Defender 110
- Marksmanship
- Close quarters reconnaissance of a farmhouse
- Fieldcraft and infantry tactics in an assault
- A booby trapped outdoor close quarters battle course, 10 targets and 30 rounds of ammunition
- Assault of a Killing House

The 29 contestants participated in an 11-day course, sleeping in tents when not on specific overnight/survival exercises. The majority failed to complete the course, retiring in the early stages on medical grounds or due to being unwilling to continue, and in latter stages due to failing to meet the required standard. One woman, Louise Rickard, made it into the final four who completed the course, with the winner selected as Gary Robertson from Dundee.

== Transmissions ==
| Series | Start date | End date | Episodes |
|---|---|---|---|
| 1 | 3 March 2002 | 17 March 2002 | 3 |
| 2 | 16 February 2003 | 23 March 2003 | 6 |
| 3 | 15 February 2004 | 21 March 2004 | 6 |

== See also ==
- Special Forces: Ultimate Hell Week (2015–2017)
- SAS: Who Dares Wins (2015–present)
