= Bainskloof Pass =

Mountain pass in the Western Cape, South Africa

- Bainskloofpas
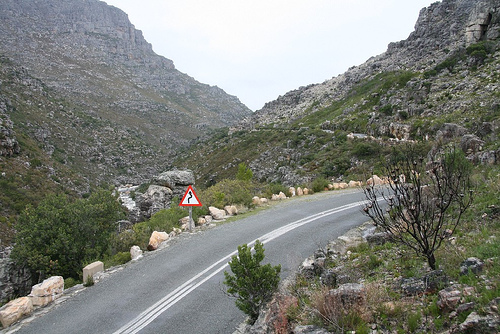
- Part of the scenery

- Location within Western Cape
- Elevation: 594 metres (1,949 ft)

Location
- Location: Wellington and Ceres, Western Cape, South Africa
- Coordinates: 33°37′00″S 19°06′00″E

Bainskloof Pass (Afrikaans: Bainskloofpas) is a mountain pass on the R301 regional road between Wellington and Ceres in the Western Cape province of South Africa. The 18-kilometer (11-mile) pass, opened in 1854, was constructed by road engineer Andrew Geddes Bain with the use of convict labour. Originally built for horse-drawn traffic, the pass was later tarred, this remained the main road to the northuntil the later opening of the DuToitskloof pass.

The pass reaches 594 metres (1,949 ft) at its highest point. Here, the road joins the Witte River, which descends the northern side of the mountains through a precipitous cleft to a stretch of rapids, waterfalls and natural pools. Bainskloof Pass is now a national monument.

Plaques of the Bainskloof Pass
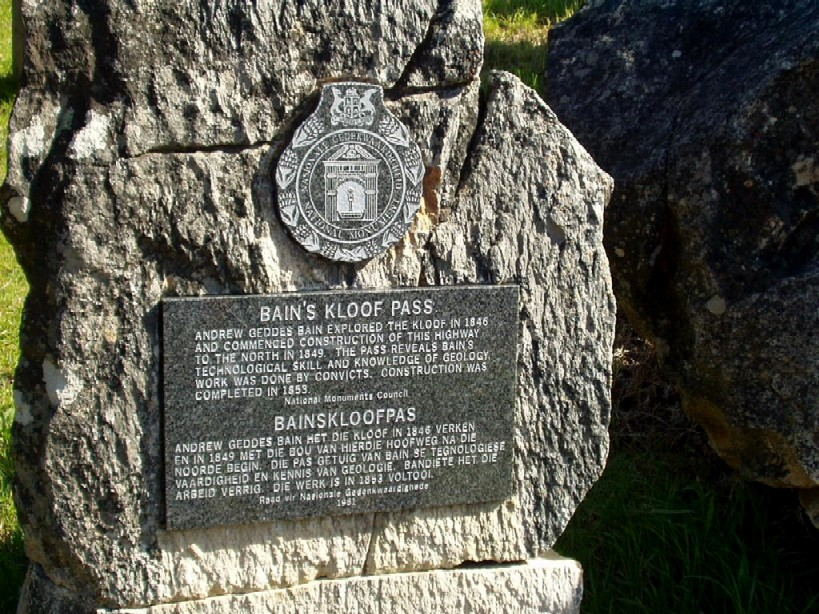
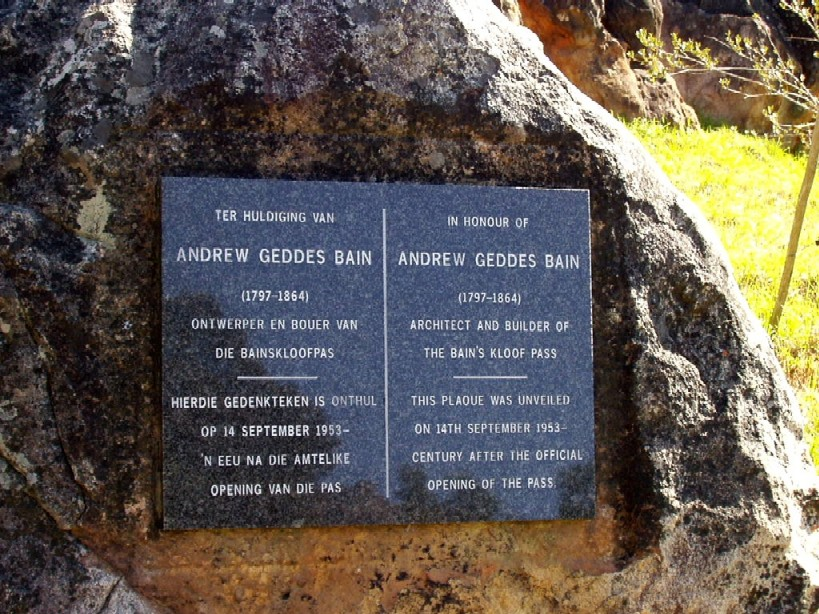

After roadworks starting in 2018, it finally reopened to the public in June 2022.

== See also ==
- Andrew Geddes Bain
- Bainskloof moss frog
- Bain's Cape Mountain Whisky
