= Wolseley, South Africa =

Wolseley
- Location within Western Cape Location within South Africa
- Coordinates: 33°24′47″S 19°12′06″E
- Country: South Africa
- Province: Western Cape
- District: Cape Winelands
- Municipality: Witzenberg

Area
  - Total: 2.35 km^{2} (0.91 sq mi)
- Elevation: 260 m (850 ft)

Population (2011)
  - Total: 1,528
  - Density: 650/km^{2} (1,680/sq mi)

Racial makeup (2011)
  - Black African: 9.8%
  - Coloured: 22.9%
  - Indian/Asian: 0.7%
  - White: 62.6%
  - Other: 4.0%

First languages (2011)
  - Afrikaans: 87.8%
  - Xhosa: 1.7%
  - English: 6.3%
  - Other: 4.2%
- Time zone: UTC+2 (SAST)
- Postal code (street): 6830
- PO box: 6830
- Area code: 023

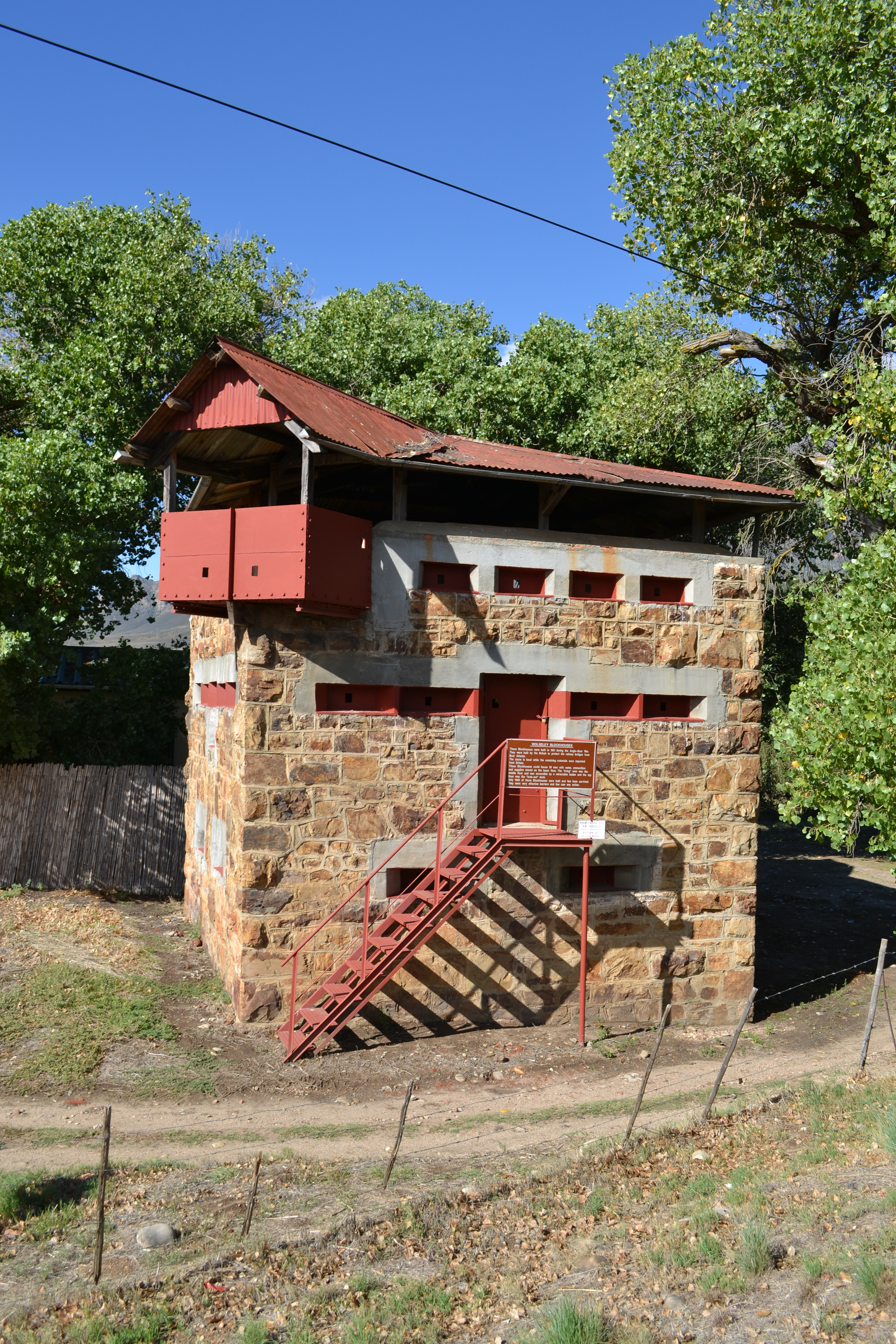
The Wolseley Blockhouse built in 1901 during Anglo-Boer War.

Wolseley is a small town in the upper Breede River Valley region of the Western Cape province of South Africa. In the 2011 Census it had a population of 1,528 people. It is located 90 kilometres (60 mi) northeast of Cape Town, in the Land van Waveren valley between the Waterval Mountains to the west and the Witzenberg Mountains to the east.

== Geography ==
Wolseley lies at an altitude of 260 metres (850 ft) on the watershed between the drainage basins of the Breede River, which flows south to the Indian Ocean, and the Berg River, which flows north to the Atlantic Ocean. It is 15 kilometres (9 mi) south of Tulbagh, 12 kilometres (7 mi) southwest of Ceres, and 35 kilometres (22 mi) northwest of Worcester.

== Government ==
Wolseley is divided between wards 2 and 7 of the Witzenberg Local Municipality, which has its headquarters at Ceres.

== Transport ==
Wolseley is located just off the R46 regional route, which runs north to Tulbagh and the Nuwekloof Pass to the Swartland, and east over Michell's Pass to Ceres. The R43 regional route begins nearby at a junction with the R46, and runs south to the N1 national route at Worcester. The R43 also connects to the R301 over Bain's Kloof Pass to Wellington.

It is also situated on the main railway line from Cape Town to the interior. Wolseley railway station is served by Metrorail's "Boland Blitz" service, with one train per day in the morning from Worcester to Cape Town, and one in the evening in the other direction. Wolseley is also the junction for the now-closed branch line to Ceres.

== In popular culture ==
In the novel Wolseley (2014) by South African author John J le Grange, the town is home to the family of three who travel to Cape Town looking for a better fortune, as well as being the title to the book.
