= Louise Rickard =

- Born: 31 December 1970 (age 55)
- Height: 1.75 m (5 ft 9 in)
- Weight: 65 kg (143 lb; 10.2 st)

Rugby union career
- Position(s): Lock, wing, centre
International career
Years	Team	Apps	(Points)
1993-	Wales	112	

Louise Rickard (born 31 December 1970) is a Welsh rugby union player. She has played at lock, wing and centre positions. She is one of the most capped players in the history of women's rugby at 112 caps for Wales.

Rickard played her first international match in 1993 against England. She was nominated for the BBC Wales Sports Personality for the year 2009. In 2016, she played a key role in securing the first Masters Touch Tournament in Gif, Paris.

She was educated at St Joseph's College, Ipswich. In 1992, she graduated from Aberystwyth University with a Bachelor of Science degree in biology and with a PhD in marine biology in 1996. She is presently the head of biology at Woodbridge School in Suffolk.

She competed in the first (Scottish Highlands) series of SAS: Are You Tough Enough? in 2002, reaching the final four from a starting field of 29 contestants.

She has also been selected at a national level in hockey, karate, touch rugby and bobsleigh. In 2017, she was made an Honorary Fellow of Aberystwyth University.
