= R311 (South Africa) =

Regional route in South Africa

Regional route R311
- R311 route map

Route information
- Length: 55 km (34 mi)

Major junctions
- Northwest end: R45 between Malmesbury and Hopefield
- N7 at Moorreesburg
- Southeast end: R46 at Riebeek-Kasteel

Location
- Country: South Africa
- Major cities: Hopefield, Moorreesburg, Riebeek West, Riebeek-Kasteel

Highway system
- Numbered routes of South Africa
← R310	→ R312

The R311 is a Regional Route in South Africa that connects the R45 between Malmesbury and Hopefield to the north-west with Riebeek-Kasteel to the south-east.

== Route ==
From the R45, the route heads east. It passes through Moorreesburg, where it meets the N7. It is briefly co-signed heading south, before diverging to head south-east. It passes through Riebeek West to end at Riebeek-Kasteel at an intersection with the R46.
