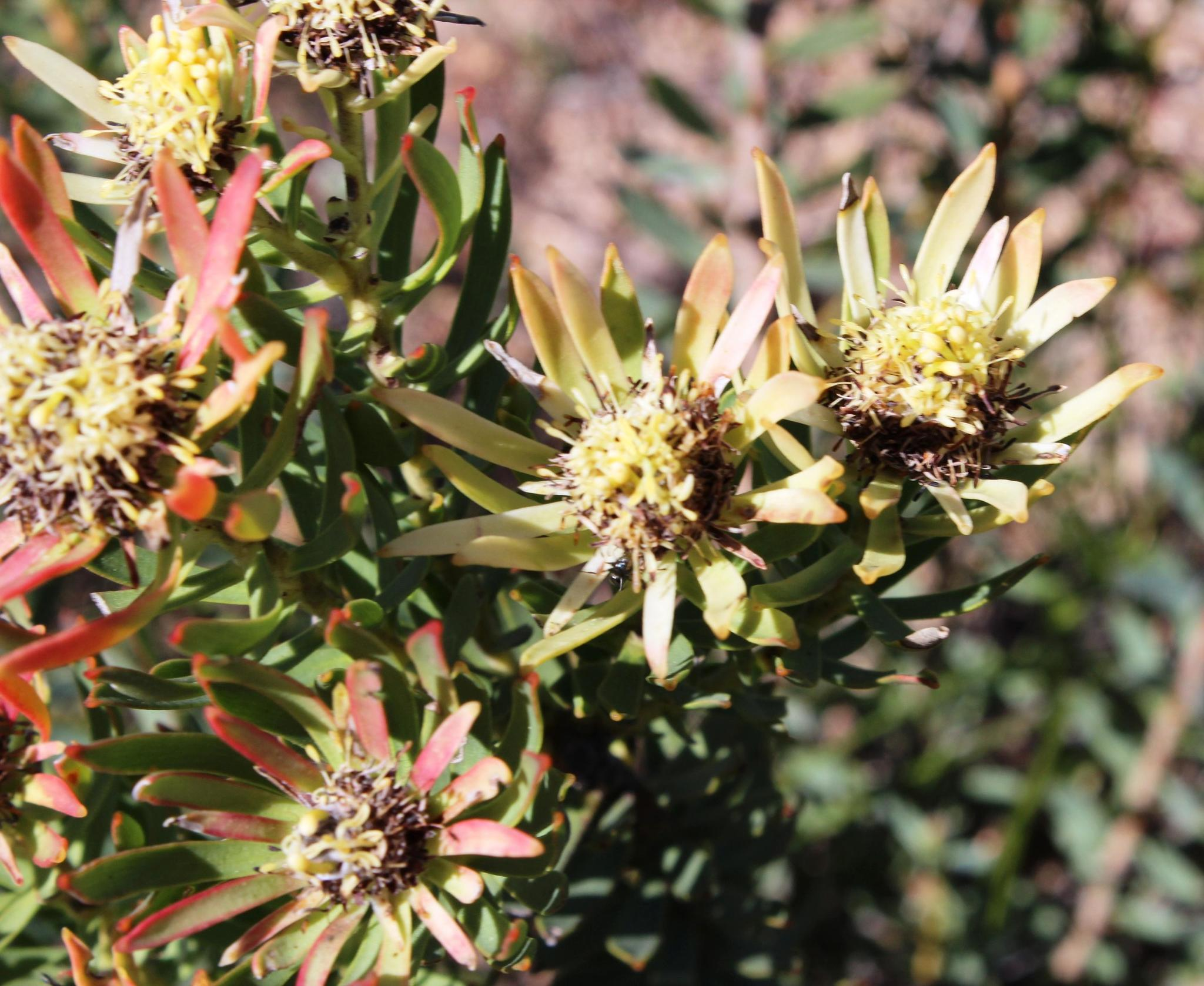

Conservation status
- Endangered (IUCN 3.1)

Scientific classification
- Kingdom: Plantae
- Clade: Tracheophytes
- Clade: Angiosperms
- Clade: Eudicots
- Order: Proteales
- Family: Proteaceae
- Genus: Leucadendron
- Species: L. lanigerum

Binomial name
- Leucadendron lanigerum H.Buek ex Meisn.

= Leucadendron lanigerum =

Species of plant

Leucadendron lanigerum, the shale conebush, is a species of plant in the genus Leucadendron. It was first described by Heinrich Wilhelm Buek, and given the correct name by Carl Meissner.

== Subspecies ==
There are two subspecies recognized under L. lanigerum.

- Leucadendron lanigerum var. laevigatum (Worcester shale conebush)
- Leucadendron lanigerum var. lanigerum (Common shale conebush)
