= R301 (South Africa) =

Regional route in South Africa

Regional route R301
- R301 route map

Route information
- Length: 60 km (37 mi)

Major junctions
- North end: R43 near Wolseley
- R101 in Paarl; N1 in Paarl
- South end: R45 near Franschhoek

Location
- Country: South Africa

Highway system
- Numbered routes of South Africa
← R300	→ R302

The R301 is a regional route in the Western Cape province of South Africa that connects Wemmershoek with Wolseley via Paarl and Wellington.

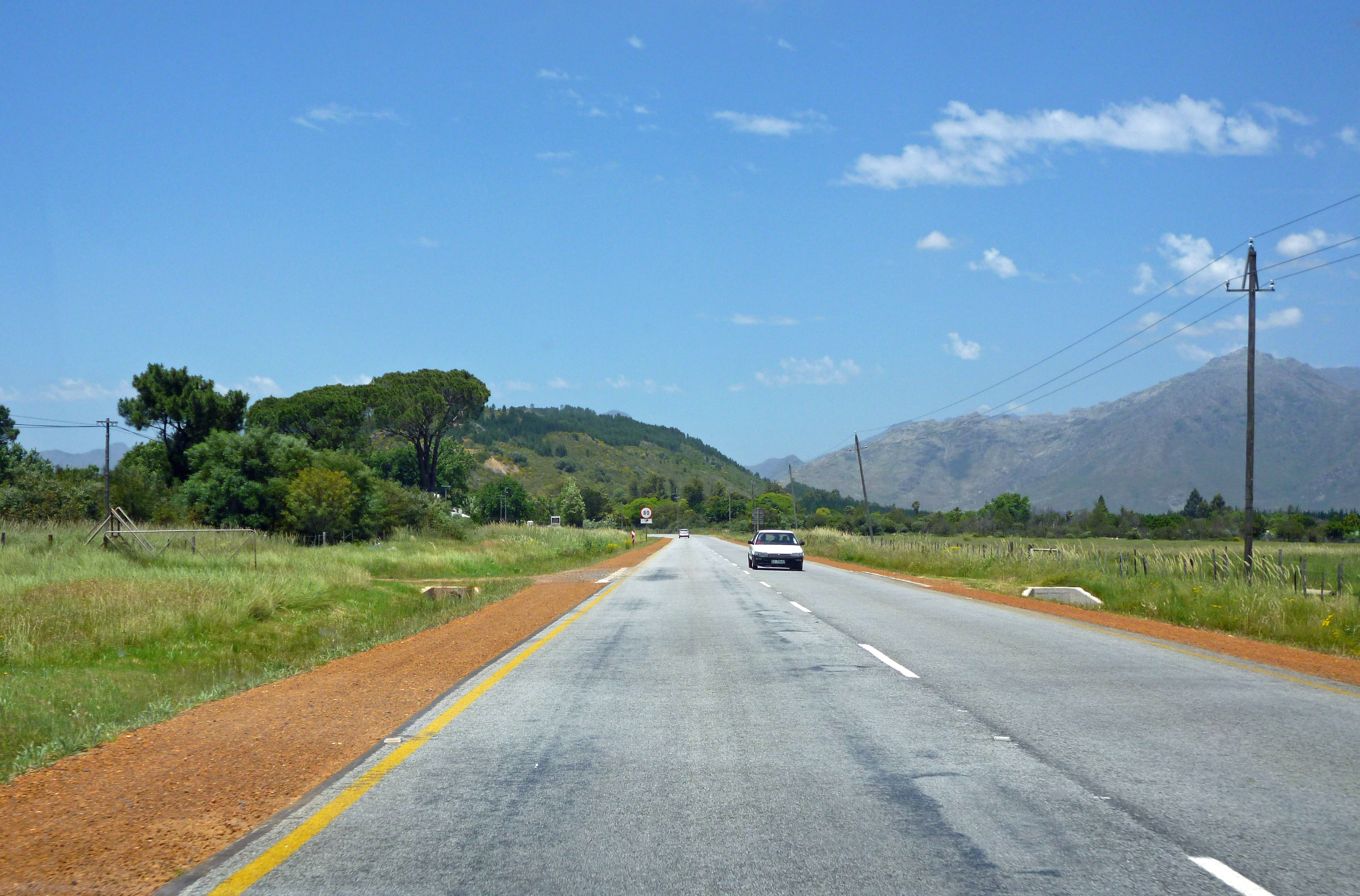
Heading southbound on the R301 from Paarl to Wemmershoek

== Route ==
The R301 begins at an intersection with the R45 at Wemmershoek and runs north for 18 kilometres, following the Berg River, to cross the N1 at exit 59 and reach a junction with the R101 road (Langenhoven Road) east of the Paarl CBD. The R301 continues northwards for 8 kilometres as Jan Van Riebeeck Road, through the eastern suburbs of Paarl (Groenheuwel), to enter the town of Wellington and become Piet Retief Street in the suburb of Newton. It continues northwards for 3 kilometres to enter the Wellington CBD, where it makes a right turn to become Church Street towards the east-north-east. It continues north-east for 31 kilometres, becoming the Bain's Kloof Pass, to cross the Breede River and end at an intersection with the R43 approximately 11 kilometres south of Wolseley.
