= Rademann =

Rademann is a German surname. Notable people with the surname include:

- Hans-Christoph Rademann (born 1965), German conductor
- Wolfgang Rademann (1934–2016), German television producer and journalist

== See also ==
- Rademan
