= Leucadendron lanigerum var. lanigerum =

Conservation status
- Endangered (IUCN 3.1)

Scientific classification
- Kingdom: Plantae
- Clade: Tracheophytes
- Clade: Angiosperms
- Clade: Eudicots
- Order: Proteales
- Family: Proteaceae
- Genus: Leucadendron
- Species: L. lanigerum H.Buek ex Meisn.
- Variety: L. l. var. lanigerum

Trinomial name
- Leucadendron lanigerum var. lanigerum

Synonyms
- Leucadendron floridum Drège ex Meisn.; Leucadendron heterophyllum E.Mey. ex Meisn.; Leucadendron rubricallosum H.Buek ex Meisn.; Protea lanigera Kuntze

Variety of plant

Leucadendron lanigerum var. lanigerum, the Common shale conebush or Swartland shale conebush, is a flowering shrub and variety of Leucadendron lanigerum, belonging to the genus Leucadendron and forming part of the fynbos biome. The species is endemic to the Western Cape where it occurs on the Cape Flats, and Malmesbury Flats from the Strand and Diep River to Bainskloof and Dassenberg.

The shrub grows up to 1.5 m tall and re-sprouts after burning. The shrub flowers from July to September. The seeds are stored in a thorn on the female plant, fall to the ground after burning and are dispersed by the wind, the seeds have wings. The plant is unisexual and there are separate plants with male and female flowers and are pollinated by small beetles. The shrub grows in sand at altitudes of 180 - 200 m.
