= Special Forces: Ultimate Hell Week =

- Genre: Reality television
- Presented by: Andrew Flintoff; Reggie Yates
- Starring: Clinton Agnew; Rafal Nowakowski; Terry Schappert; Jason Falla; Ken Rhee; Yann 'Tana' Delrue; Sonny Puzikas; Bob Podesta; Woodie Mister; Itay Gil; Ray Care
- Country of origin: United Kingdom
- Original language: English
- No. of series: 2
- No. of episodes: 12

Production
- Executive producers: Rachel Watson (9 episodes, 2015–2017); Aysha Rafaele (1 episode, 2017)
- Production locations: Wales, United Kingdom (series 1); Wemmershoek, Western Cape, South Africa (series 2)
- Running time: 60 minutes
- Production company: BBC Documentaries

Original release
- Network: BBC Two
- Release: 30 August 2015 – 5 March 2017

Special Forces: Ultimate Hell Week is a British reality television series where physically fit civilian contestants are put through special forces style selection exercises. Each episode features an instructor and exercises from a different force, and contestants either withdraw voluntarily, are medically withdrawn, or are dismissed for poor performance.

The first series, aired in 2015, was presented by former cricket player Andrew Flintoff and the second in 2017 by media personality Reggie Yates.

== Instructors ==
=== Series 1 ===
Force	Name	Addressed as
United States Navy SEALs	Ray Care, Woodie Mister	?
Israeli YAMAM	Itay Gil	?
Philippines NAVSOG	Dante Membrere	Tor
Australian SAS Regiment	Jason Falla	Staff
Russian SPETSNAZ	Sonny Puzikas	?
British SAS	Bob Podesta	Sir

=== Series 2 ===
Force	Name	Addressed as
South African Special Forces Brigade	Clinton Agnew	Colonel
Polish JW GROM	Rafal Nowakowski	?
United States Green Berets	Terry Schappert	Sergeant
Republic of Korea Navy UDT	Ken Rhee	Captain
French GIGN	Yann 'Tana' Delrue	?
Australian SAS Regiment	Jason Falla	?

== Contestants ==
=== Series 1 ===
Seven (7) women and twenty-two (22) men entered base-camp on day 1.

Reason for exit	Training style during exit	Phase during exit	Name	Gender	Expertise
Voluntary	SEALs	Tent building (team bonding)	Brookes	Male	?
Voluntary	SEALs	Breakout (shock and awe survival)	Bevan	Female	?
Medical suspected back injury	SEALs	Sugar Cookies (punishment and reward)	Coe-O’Brien (Cob)	Female	Triathlon
Medical; Achilles tendon injury	SEALs	Dump Boat (physical endurance and leadership)	Owen	Male	Gymnastics
Voluntary	SEALs	Dump Boat (physical endurance and leadership)	Simpson	Female	?
Medical knee injury	SEALs	Log PT (individual strength and team unity)	Cherry	Male	?
Dismissed weakness	SEALs	-	Pounder	Male	Firefighting
Voluntary	YAMAM	Route March	988-Lycett	Female	Ambulance call handling, grandmother
Medical wrist fracture	YAMAM	Krav Maga (close quarters protection - combat skills)	982-Folarin	Male	Stage performance
Dismissed weaknes	YAMAM	-	995-Parker	Male	?
Dismissed low engagement	YAMAM	-	990-McGuire	Male	Stripping
Medical torn calf muscle	NAVSOG	Search & Rescue: River Evacuation (observation, team coordination)	Lacey	Male	?
Dismissed weakness	NAVSOG	Hell Blast (determination, team spirit)	Hellard	Male	?
Voluntary	NAVSOG	Search for Iron Man: swim (navigation, stamina)	Francis	Male	?
Dismissed poor navigation	NAVSOG	Search for Iron Man: 15k run	Anderson	Male	?
Voluntary	SASR	15K Ruck Run (40 mins) (strength, G)	Martlew	Female	Obstacle racing
Failure to complete Iron Man	NAVSOG	Search for Iron Man: 15k run	Steggels	Male	?
Dismissed poor leadership	SASR	Stores Carry 1 (physical endurance, leadership)	M. Miller	Male	?
Voluntary	SASR	Search & Rescue (resistance to fatigue)	Hunter	Male	Competitive coal carrying
Dismissed old age	SPETSNAZ	-	Parrish	Male	Endurance swimmer
Dismissed poor consistency, questionable motivation	SPETSNAZ	-	Doran	Male	?
Dismissed dishonesty	SPETSNAZ	-	Spicer	Male	?
Dismissed not accepting personal responsibility for failures	SPETSNAZ	-	Proctor	Male	?
Voluntary	SAS	Interrogation (to not reveal operational information)	Murphy	Female	?
Dismissed arrogant attitude	SAS	Interrogation (to not reveal operational information)	Gatenby	Male	?
Dismissed revealing too much information	SAS	Interrogation (to not reveal operational information)	Curnyn	Male	?

Winner	Un-dismissed finalists	
C. Miller (Female)	Bent (Male)	Brassington (Male)

=== Series 2 ===
Reason for exit	Training style during exit	Phase During Exit	Name	Expertise
Dismissed weakness	South African Special Forces Brigade	Physical Assessment (fitness, mental alertness)	Summerville	Prison officer
Voluntary	SA Special Forces Brigade	Physical Assessment (fitness, mental alertness)	Francis	Iron Man
Dismissed weakness	SA Special Forces Brigade	-	Logan	?
Dismissed weakness, tardiness	JW GROMS	Sleep Deprivation (physical and mental alertness)	Nawaz	?
Dismissed low engagement, failure to follow orders	JW GROMS	10k run; Memory hill (individual endurance; memory recall during extreme exertion)	Harisson	?

== See also ==
- SAS: Are You Tough Enough? (2002–2004)
- SAS: Who Dares Wins (2015–)
