= Wemmershoek =

- Location within Western Cape Location within South Africa
- Coordinates: 33°52′28″S 19°02′25″E
- Country: South Africa
- Province: Western Cape
- District: Cape Winelands
- Municipality: Stellenbosch

Area
  - Total: 1.04 km^{2} (0.40 sq mi)

Population (2011)
  - Total: 1,034
  - Density: 994/km^{2} (2,580/sq mi)

Racial makeup (2011)
  - Black African: 1.6%
  - Coloured: 96.2%
  - Indian/Asian: 0.6%
  - White: 1.5%

First languages (2011)
  - Afrikaans: 92.4%
  - English: 4.8%
  - Other: 2.7%
- Time zone: UTC+2 (SAST)

Wemmershoek is a settlement in Cape Winelands District Municipality in the Western Cape province of South Africa.

Wemmershoek is a small village at the junction of the R301 and R45 roads. The Wemmershoek Dam on the Wemmershoek River was established in 1957.

The town is about 7 km west of Franschhoek and about 2 km south of De Hollandsche Molen.

== Popular culture ==
Was the location of filming for the BBC's Special Forces: Ultimate Hell Week.
