= Moorreesburg =

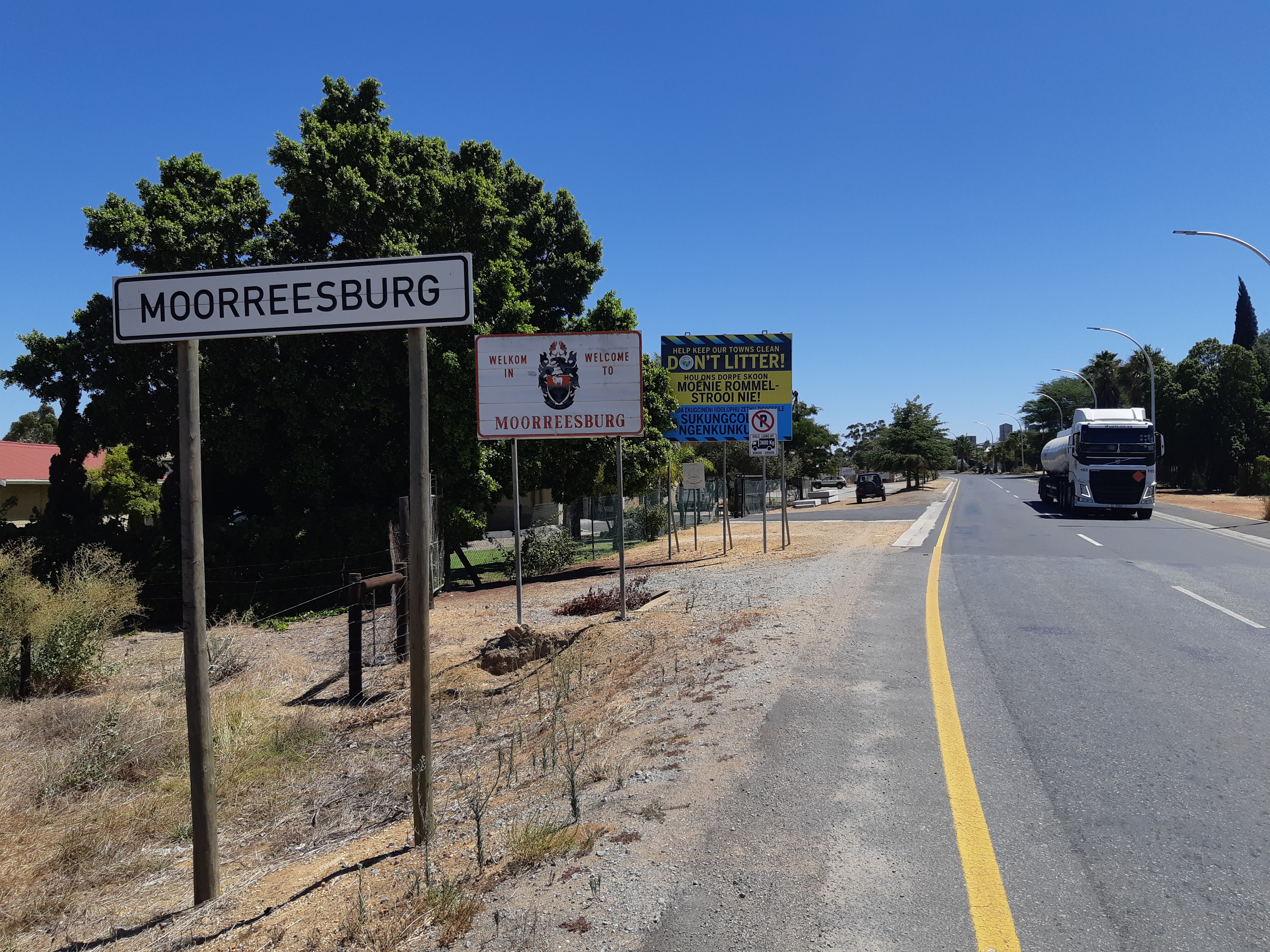
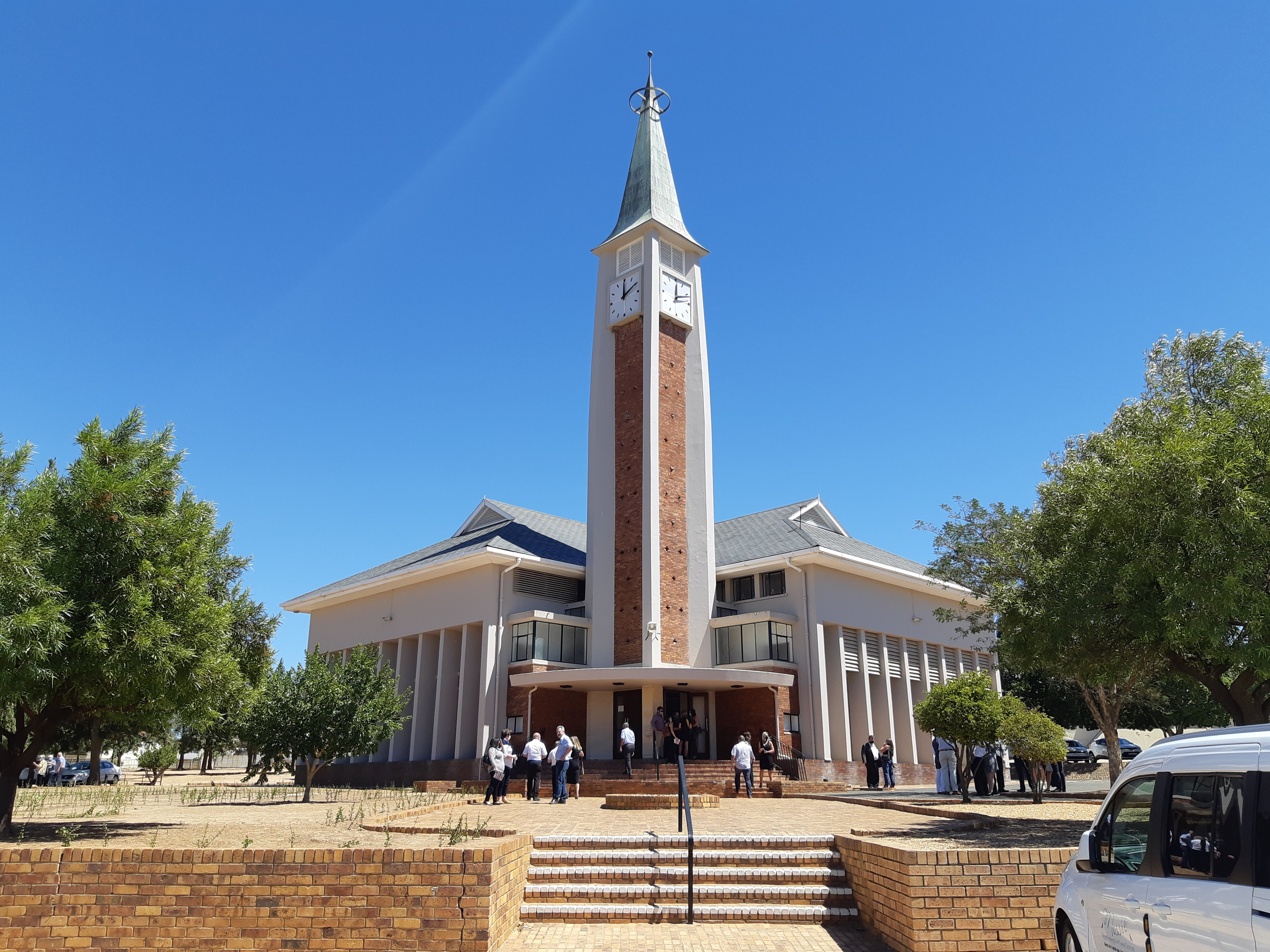
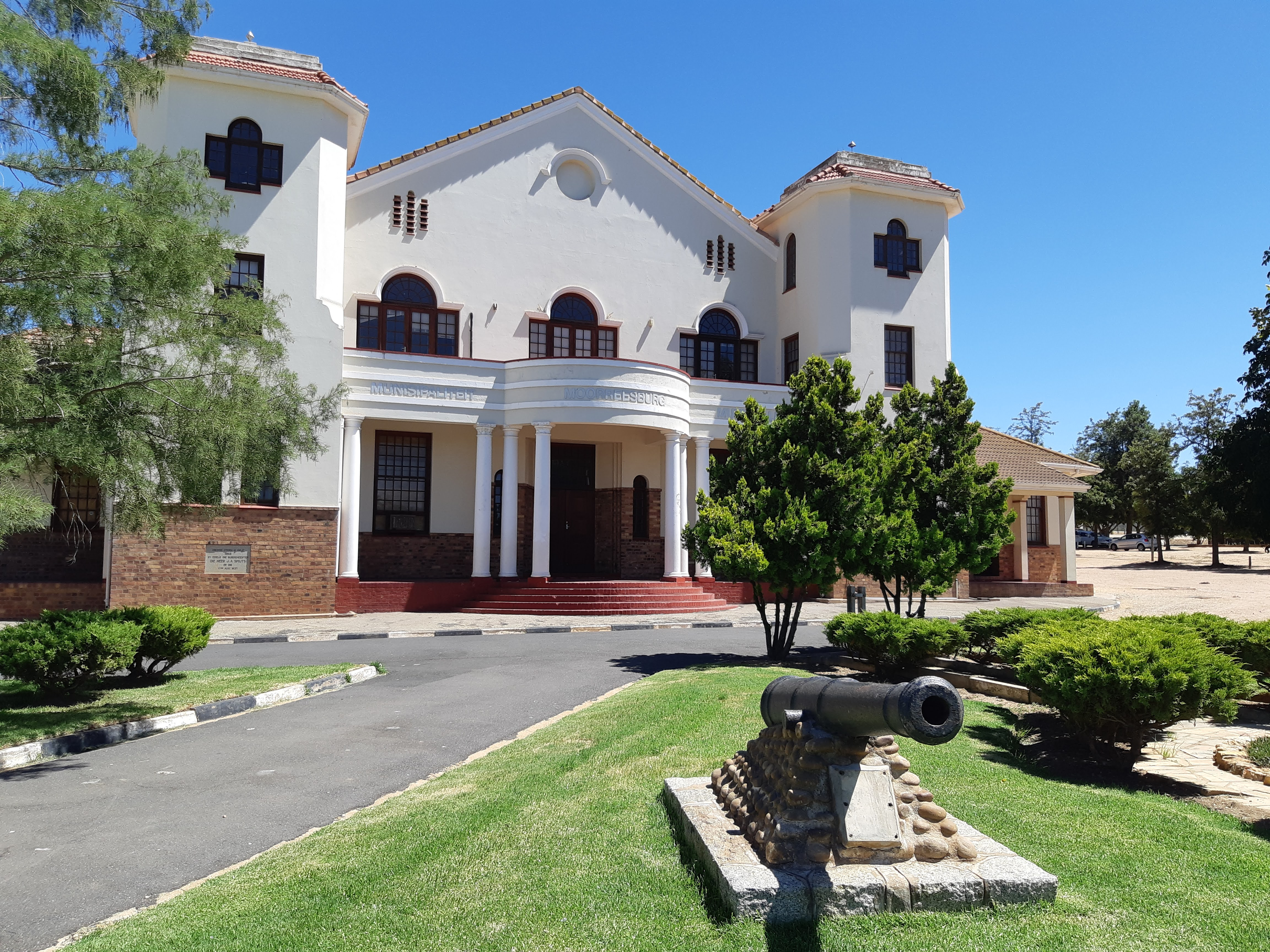
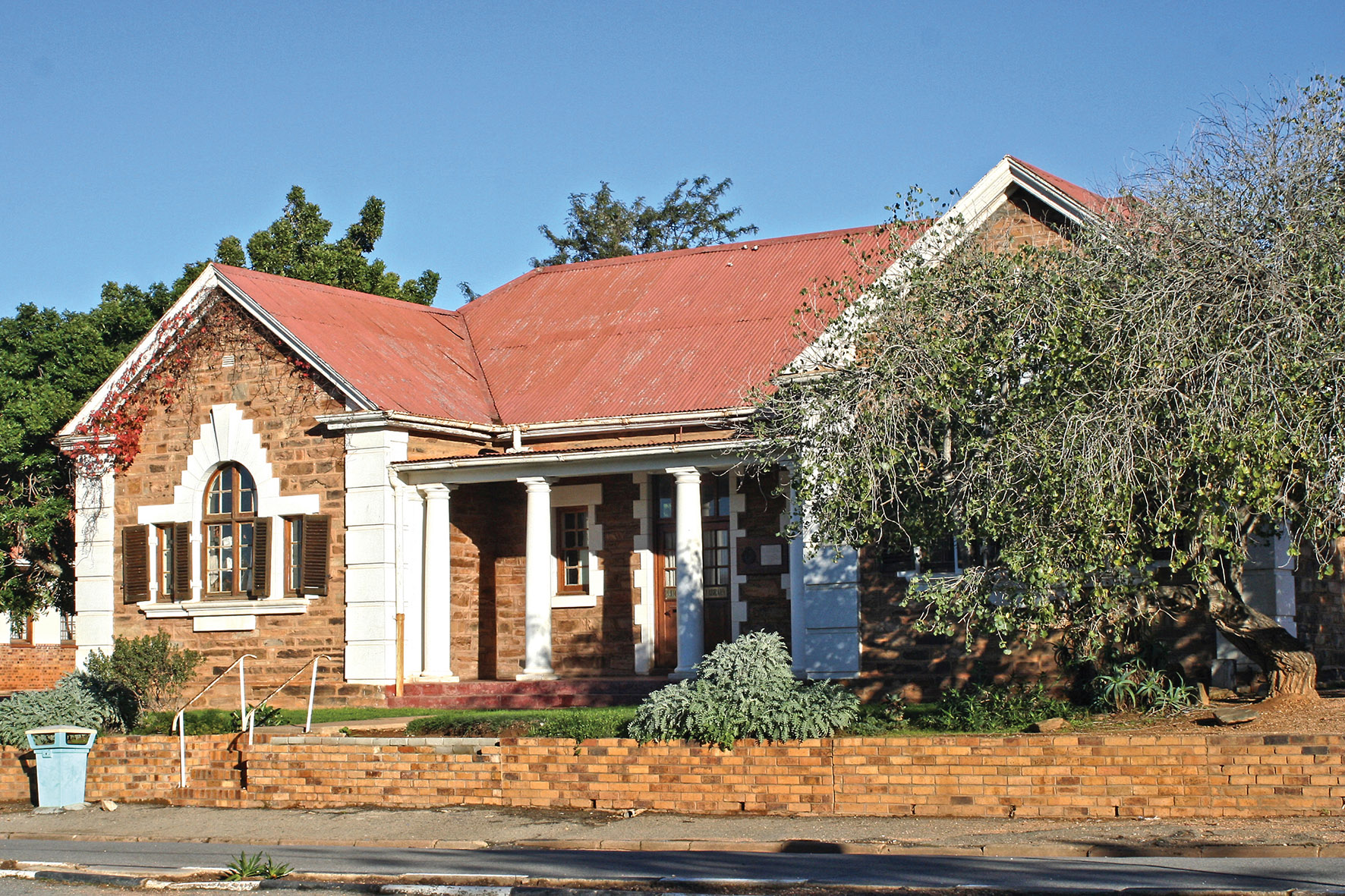
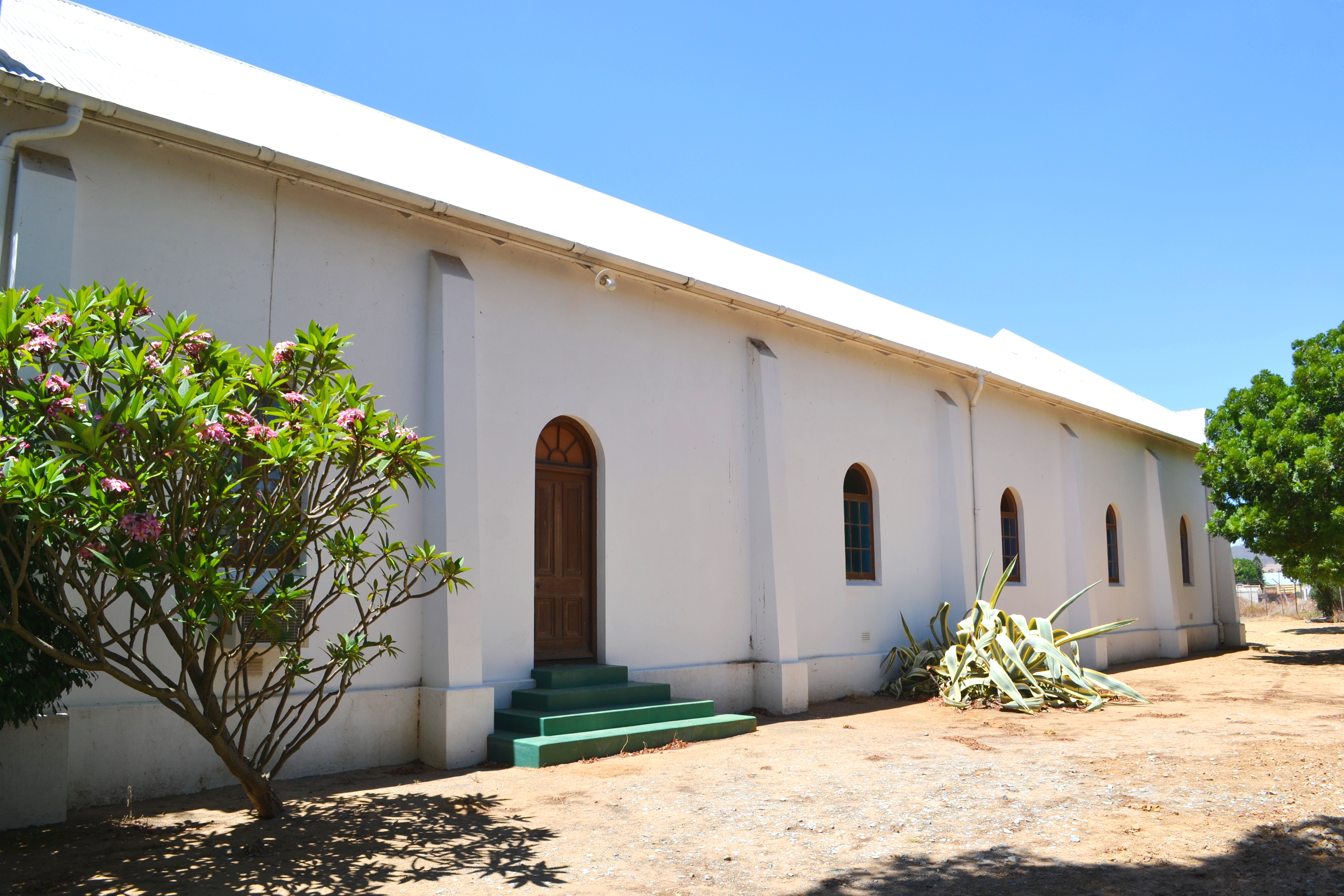
- From top, welcome signs to Moorreesburg. Middle left, Dutch Reformed Church in Moorreesburg. Middle right, the Moorreesburg Town hall. Carnegie library in Moorreesburg (bottom left). Moorreesburg Wheat Museum & Old Mission Church building (bottom right).

- Location within Western Cape Location within South Africa
- Coordinates: 33°09′S 18°40′E
- Country: South Africa
- Province: Western Cape
- District: West Coast
- Municipality: Swartland
- Established: 1882

Area
  - Total: 27.2 km^{2} (10.5 sq mi)

Population (2011)
  - Total: 7,760
  - Density: 285/km^{2} (739/sq mi)

Racial makeup (2011)
  - Black African: 9.6%
  - Coloured: 52.5%
  - Indian/Asian: 0.2%
  - White: 37.3%
  - Other: 0.4%

First languages (2011)
  - Afrikaans: 88.3%
  - Xhosa: 5.6%
  - English: 3.4%
  - Other: 2.7%
- Time zone: UTC+2 (SAST)
- Postal code (street): 7310
- PO box: 7310
- Area code: 022

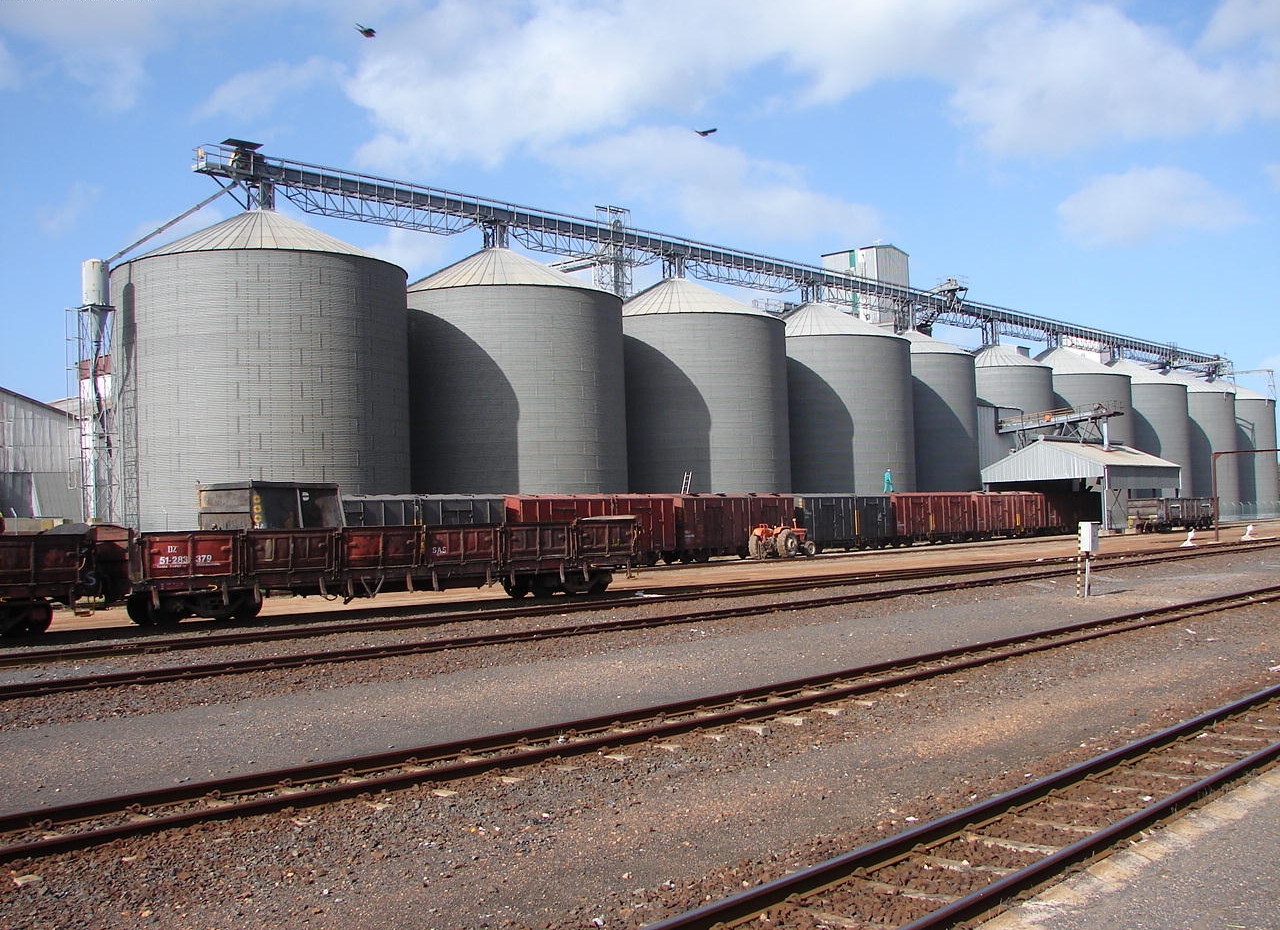
Grain silos next to the Moorreesburg railway station. The town is a major logistical center for the region's grain industry.

Moorreesburg is a rural town situated about 90 kilometres (60 mi) north of Cape Town, in the Western Cape province of South Africa. It was laid out in 1879 on the farm Hooikraal, was administered by a village management board from 1882 and attained municipal status in 1909. Today it falls within the Swartland Local Municipality, which is part of the West Coast District Municipality. The town is the seat of government for the West Coast District Municipality.

Moorreesburg lies just off the N7 national road, at a driving distance of 100 kilometres (62 mi) from Cape Town. The R311 regional road also passes through the town, as does the West Coast branch line railway. It has two public primary schools, one public high school, a library, a police station, a magistrate's court, and a health clinic.

== History and economy ==
Moorreesburg was named after J.C. le Febre Moorrees (1807–1885), minister of the Swartland congregation of the Nederduitse Gereformeerde Kerk from 1833 to 1881. In 1889 a village council was established, by 1909 the settlement was granted the status of a municipality. In 1911 a Carnegie Library was established in the town.

The town is an important logistical and processing hub for wheat and oats, two crops that are extensively cultivated in the surrounding area. The importance of the wheat industry to the town is the subject of the Moorreesburg Wheat Industry Museum.

== Demographics ==
According to the 2011 census, Moorreesburg proper has a population of 7,760 people in 2,578 households. 53% of the population identified themselves as "Coloured", while 37% identified as "White" and 10% as "Black". 88% spoke Afrikaans as their first language, while 6% spoke Xhosa and 3% spoke English.
