= R301 (Morocco) =

Road in Morocco

R301 is a coastal highway in Western Morocco connecting the cities of Essaouira and El Jadida. This paved highway varies between two and four lanes of travel. In many locations views of the Atlantic Ocean coastline are available. There are a number of coastal bridges spanned by the B301 including one over the Wadi Oum er-Rbia estuary at Azemmour. At the southern part of the R301 lies some of the earliest recorded settlement history in Morocco: the archaeological ruins of Mogador, which were originally Phoenician from at least as early as the first millennium BC.
