= Simon Rademan =

South African fashion designer

Simon Petrus Rademan, is a South African fashion designer and stylist. As a couturier and author, he is known for his contribution to South African style and etiquette.

== Early history ==
Simon Rademan was born in Ceres, in the then Cape Province of South Africa, in 1964. Both his parents were deaf, so he learned sign language before he could speak either Afrikaans or English. He matriculated at the Charlie Hofmeyr High school, and completed two years of military conscription in Pretoria in the then Transvaal Province. He worked as a bank-clerk for five years and made his mark as an actor, radio artist and performer. Simon Rademan took part-time studies in Art, Graphic art, Make-up, Hairstyling, Modelling and Paint Techniques, he enrolled at the International Academy of Fashion in Gauteng.

== Career ==
He enrolled at the International Academy of Fashion in Pretoria to study Fashion design and received his Diploma in Haute Couture and majored in Pattern Design, Textiles and Creative Styling. He was the recipient of many awards: Student of the year – 1989, The woolboard - 1989, Young Designer Award - 1990, Most innovative Designer – 1992. Sanlam and Volksblad Designer Award – 1993.

His lecturing in design, millinery, etiquette, modelling and beading has influenced a generation of young designers. Simon Rademan went on to register The Simon Rademan Fashion Design Studio, a design house that is today widely recognized for its craftsmanship and style. He was also afforded the opportunity to be the designer for the FIFA draw. At his coming of age in the industry in 2010, he was considered a prominent figure in the South African fashion industry.

Mr Rademan has been awarded the elite honour of becoming the official South African member of the first ever "International Designer Collection". This Symbol of Global Unity took place during 2011 Rugby World Cup, and was hosted by the Prime Minister of New Zealand, Rt Hon John Key, and Style Pasifika, with 19 other countries, including... France, Canada, Japan, Argentina, England, Scotland, Romania, Ireland, Australia, United States of America, Italy, Russia and Wales.

On 4 November 2013, The Style Bible was published by Random House Struik. It is the first guide book on style to focus specifically on South African Women.
