= Hermon, South Africa =

Hermon
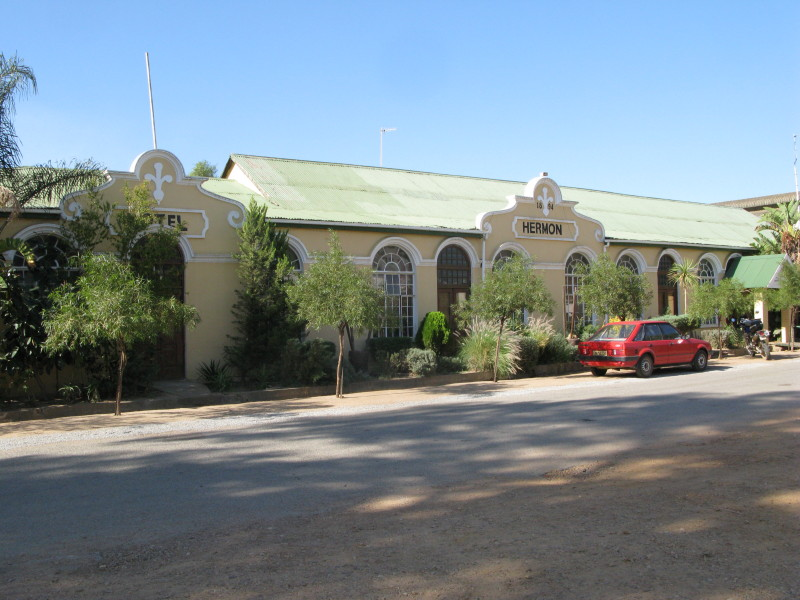
- Hotel in Hermon

- Location within Western Cape Location within South Africa
- Coordinates: 33.444°S 18.973°E
- Country: South Africa
- Province: Western Cape
- District: Cape Winelands
- Municipality: Drakenstein

Government
  - Type: Ward 31
  - Councillor: Catherine Jacobs (DA)
- Time zone: UTC+2 (SAST)
- PO box: 7308

Hermon is a village 22 km north of Wellington and 8 km from Porseleinberg. Of Hebrew origin, the name means 'elevated, 'exalted', the reference being to the biblical Mount Hermon (Deut. 3:8, 9)..
