= Franschhoek Pass =

Coordinates: 33°54′58.5″S 19°09′30.1″E

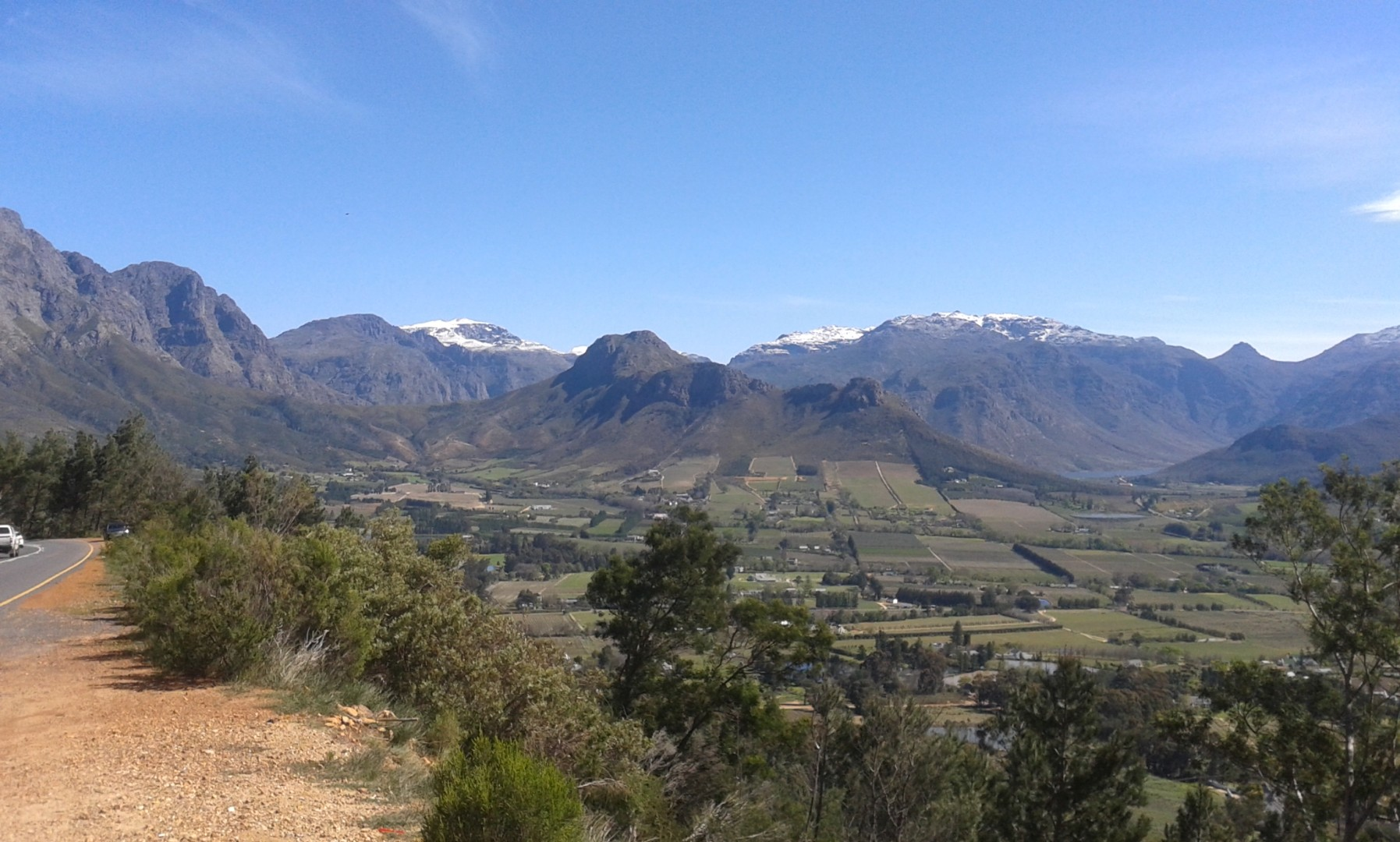
- Franschhoek Pass towards Franschhoek
- Interactive map of Franschhoek Pass
- Elevation: 736 m (2,415 ft)
- Traversed by: R45

Third Approach
- Location: Franschhoek, Western Cape, South Africa
- Range: Franschhoek Mountains

Franschhoek Pass is located in the Western Cape, Province of South Africa on the regional road R45 between Franschhoek and Villiersdorp.

The entrance to the Mont Rochelle Nature Reserve is located on this pass.

== History ==
At time of Jan van Riebeeck's settlement of the Cape in 1652, elephants were known to use a track seasonally to cross the mountains and hence was called Olifantspad. That track was a few kilometres southwest of the current pass and was still being used by horse riders and cattle herders in the early 1800s.

In 1819 a crude road was constructed over the mountain by S.J. Cats for the Stellenbosch Landdrost. It didn't last and is now a hiking path.

Governor of the Cape Colony, Lord Charles Somerset, in 1823 decided to build a new pass. Constructed by Major Holloway using troops of the Royal African Corps it was completed in 1825 costing £8,000.

After falling into disrepair in 1930 it was rebuilt in 1933 and again in 1963 when the road was tarred.

== Be Aware ==
- Skill level: Novice (Caution - Conservative speed recommended)
- Road Condition: Tarred surface, tight turns, precipitous edge
- Remarks: Fast road frequented by fast superbikes and slow tourists. Beautiful views.
- Baboons, snakes, and other wildlife crossing.
