= Michell's Pass =

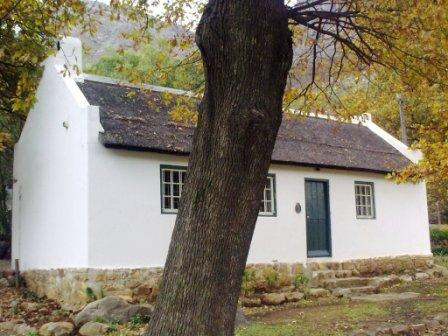
- Former toll house on Michell's Pass

- Location within Western Cape
- Elevation: 490 m (1,610 ft)
- Traversed by: R46 road Ceres branch line railway (closed)

Location
- Location: Western Cape, South Africa
- Range: Skurweberg Mountains
- Coordinates: 33°22′44″S 19°17′47″E

Michell's Pass is a mountain pass in the Western Cape province of South Africa which approaches the town of Ceres from the south-west, connecting it to Tulbagh, Worcester and the Breede River Valley. The pass is traversed by the R46 road and the Ceres branch line railway, which was re-opened for use by the Ceres Rail Company and seasonally by Transnet Freight Rail in terms of an agreement between the Ceres Rail Company and Transnet in 2012. From its western entrance near Wolseley the pass ascends 190 metres (620 ft) to the summit at an elevation of 490 metres (1,610 ft), before descending a short distance into Ceres.

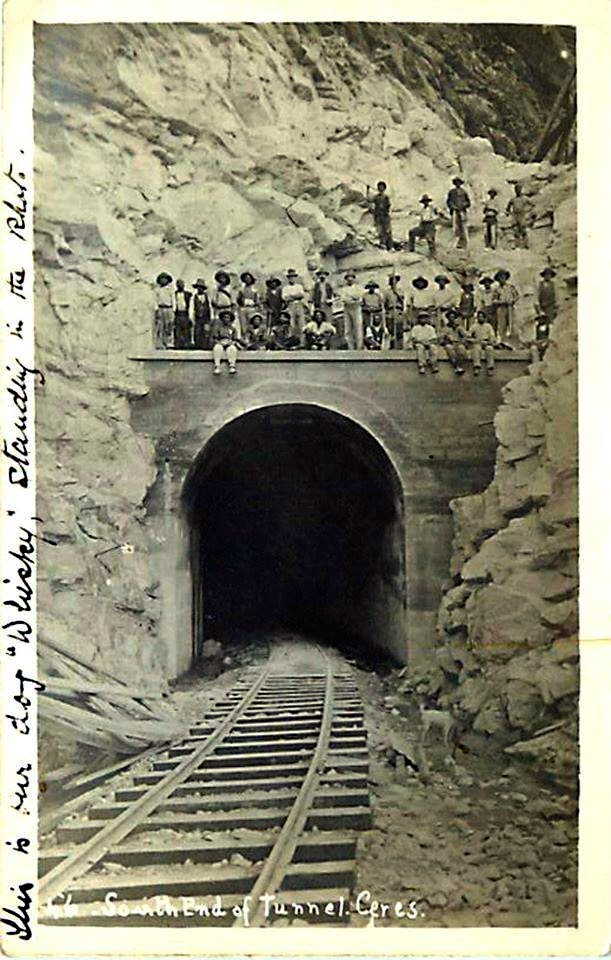
Ceres rail tunnelers at the south portal, c. 1912

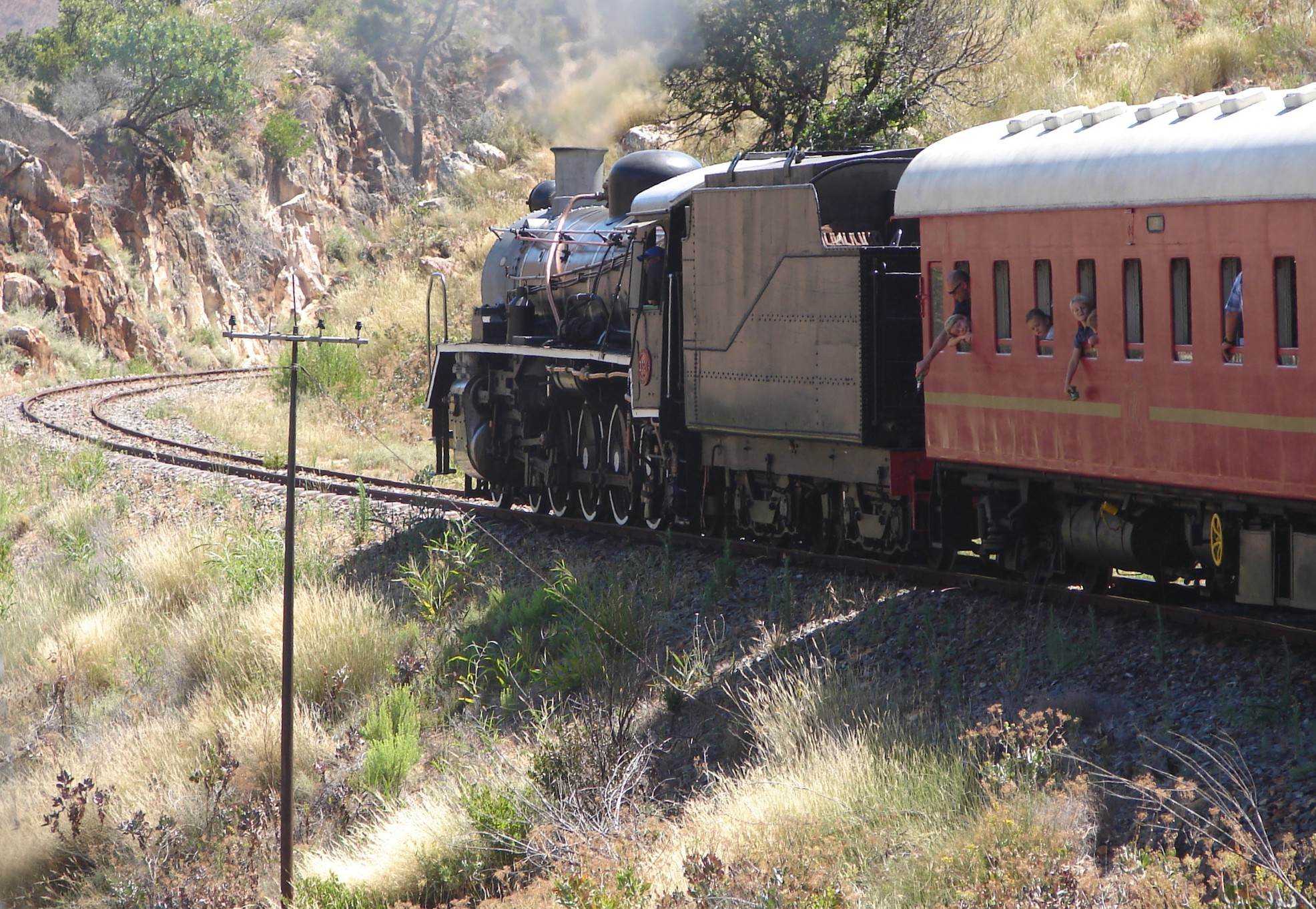
Ceres Rail Company's train in Michell's Pass, 19 December 2015

The road pass was planned by Charles Collier Michell, Surveyor-General of the Cape of Good Hope, for whom it was named. The pass was constructed in 1848 by Andrew Geddes Bain. In 1938, the road was widened and paved.

A 10 miles 29 chains (16.7 kilometres) railway branchline from Wolseley through the pass to Ceres was constructed from 1910 and opened to traffic on 20 May 1912. The north portal of a tunnel at the top of the railway pass is situated near the road and railway entrances to the town.

The 6 miles 25 chains (10.2 kilometres) extension of the railway line from Ceres to Prince Alfred Hamlet was only opened to traffic seventeen years later, on 10 April 1929.
