= Ceres, South Africa =

Town in Western Cape, South Africa

Ceres
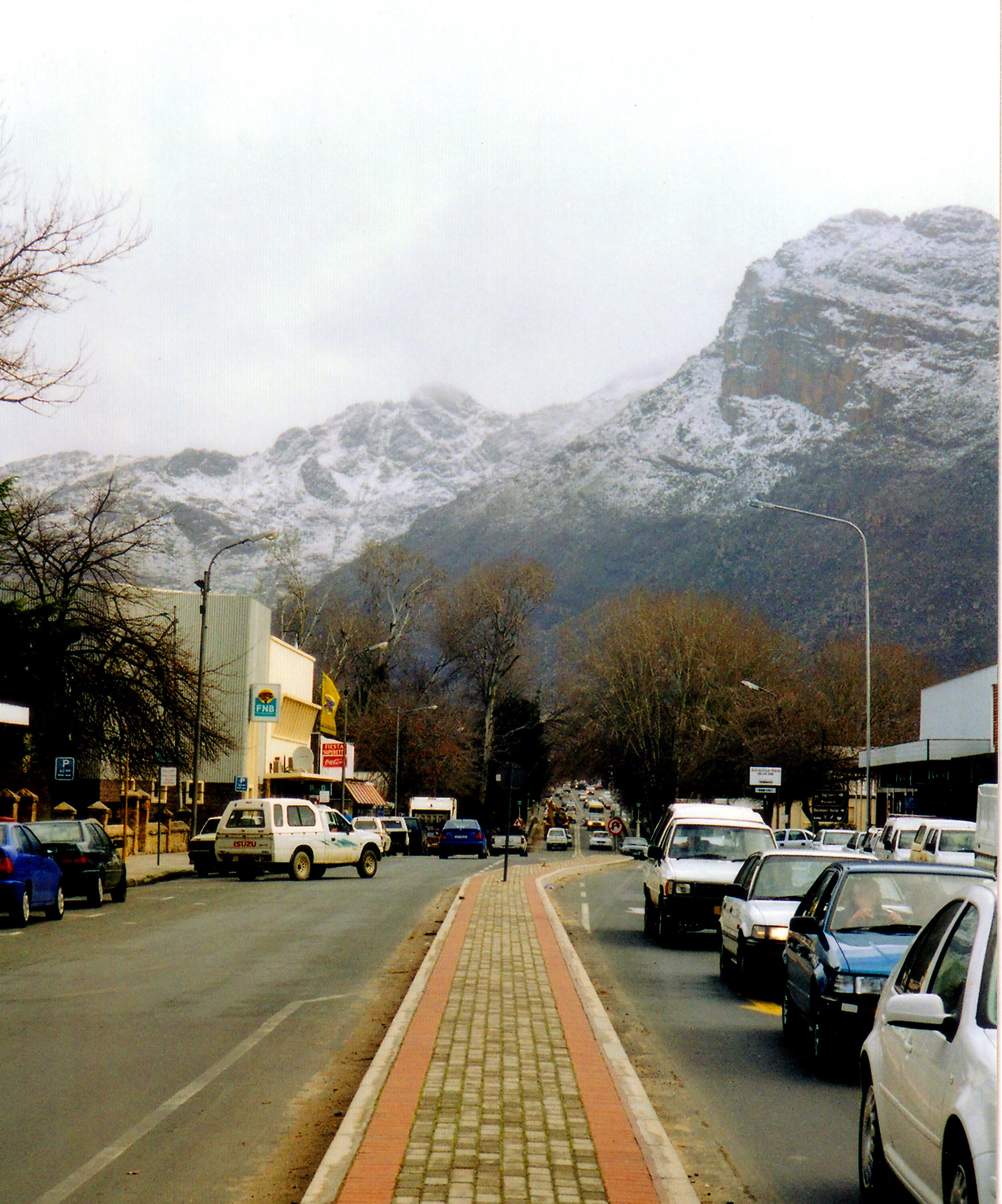
- Town centre of Ceres with its main street on a winter day

- Location within Western Cape Location within South Africa
- Coordinates: 33°22′S 19°19′E
- Country: South Africa
- Province: Western Cape
- District: Cape Winelands
- Municipality: Witzenberg
- Established: 1854

Area
  - Total: 80.7 km^{2} (31.2 sq mi)
- Elevation: 450 m (1,480 ft)

Population (2011)
  - Total: 33,224
  - Density: 412/km^{2} (1,070/sq mi)

Racial makeup (2011)
  - Black African: 28.7%
  - Coloured: 61.4%
  - Indian/Asian: 0.4%
  - White: 8.5%
  - Other: 1.0%

First languages (2011)
  - Afrikaans: 70.2%
  - Xhosa: 23.0%
  - Sotho: 2.9%
  - English: 2.1%
  - Other: 1.9%
- Time zone: UTC+2 (SAST)
- Postal code (street): 6835
- PO box: 6835
- Area code: 023

Ceres is the administrative centre and largest town of the Witzenberg Local Municipality in the Western Cape Province of South Africa. Ceres serves as a regional centre for the surrounding towns of Wolseley, Tulbagh, Op-die-Berg and Prince Alfred Hamlet. It is situated in the Warmbokkeveld (English: "warm antelope field") Valley about 170 km north-east of Cape Town. Ceres is located at the north-eastern entrance to Michell's Pass and was the old route north between Cape Town and Johannesburg, which was later replaced by the N1 highway, which traverses the Breede River Valley to the south.

Named after the Roman goddess of agriculture, Ceres, a name which is fitting as the valley in which the town is situated is extremely fertile and is a major producer of South Africa's deciduous fruit.

== Geography and climate ==
Ceres experiences a typical Mediterranean climate tempered by its altitude. The town experiences warmer temperatures in summer, due to its inland location with infrequent rainfall, however winters are cool to quite cold and wet, with frequent snowfalls on the surrounding higher-lying ground, rarely falling on the valley floor itself. Total annual precipitation averages 1088 mm, with average temperatures ranging from a February maximum of 29,9 °C to a July minimum of 2,4 °C.

The Warmbokkeveld is climatically warmer than the surrounding highlands, which is known as the Kouebokkeveld ("cold antelope field"), with the latter often experiencing snowfalls in winter.

Ceres is well known for fruit juices exported worldwide bearing the town's name. It is also famous locally for winter snow and cherries: Cape Town residents flock to the town during winter to ski or simply play in the powder — something of a rarity for the otherwise mild climate they are used to — whilst in summer, people come to pick cherries at the "Klondyke" farm.

South Africa is one of the most stable parts of the world in seismic terms but on 29 September 1969 a massive shock shook the district without warning. The epicentre of the quake was on a major local structure called the Worcester fault, which had clearly been geologically active in the distant past but had not moved in over three hundred years of recorded history. Ceres was affected badly. Many old Cape Dutch buildings were damaged and some people died. The quake was strong enough to knock plaster off walls in Cape Town, a hundred miles (160 kilometres) away.

== Notable people ==
- De Wet Barry, Rugby union player, Springbok
- Christiaan Barnard, first surgeon to perform a successful human-to-human heart transplant operation spent the early years of his medical practice in Ceres.
- Ernst Joubert, Rugby player
- Henry Francis Maltby, Writer and playwright
- Raymond Herman Mordt, Rugby union player, Springbok
- Simon Rademan, Fashion designer and stylist
- Breyton Paulse, Springbok rugby player
- Ernst van Dyk, Wheelchair racer
- John Villet, Springbok rugby player

== Coats of arms ==
Municipal (1) — The Ceres municipal council assumed a pseudo-heraldic "coat of arms" in 1928. The shield was quartered, and depicted (1) a sheaf of wheat on a red background, (2) a landscape scene showing a bridge across a river, (3) a tree on a sky blue background, and (4) a cornucopia on a green background. The motto was Loci dulcedo nos attinet.

Municipal (2) — The council assumed a proper coat of arms, designed by Ivan Mitford-Barberton and H. Ellis Tomlinson, in 1948. This was in response to a Cape Provincial Administration circular asking municipalities to have their arms checked and, if necessary, re-designed, to make them heraldically correct. The new arms were registered at the Bureau of Heraldry in March 1974.

The arms were : Vert, a fess wavy Argent, thereon a barrulet wavy Azure, over all a pale Argent charged with a representation of the goddess Ceres, vested Vert, holding in her dexter hand a sheaf of wheat and in her sinister a torch enflamed all proper; in chief a mural crown Gules. The motto was the same as before. In layman's terms, the new design was a green shield with a silver/blue/silver wavy stripe across the middle, and a vertical silver stripe depicting a red mural crown and the figure of the Roman goddess Ceres.

== See also ==
- Ceres Transport Riders’ Museum

== Gallery ==
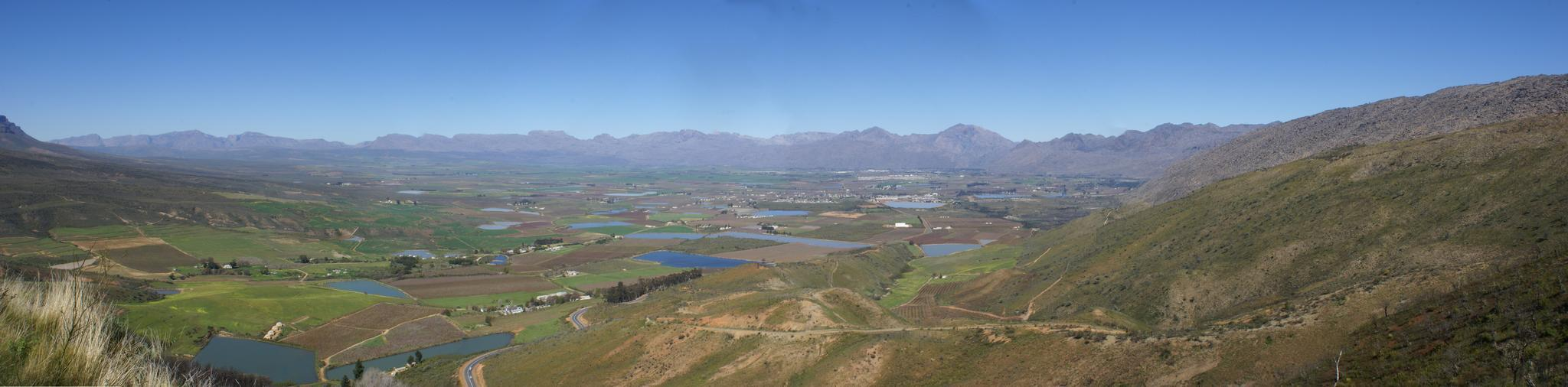
A panoramic view of the Ceres valley.
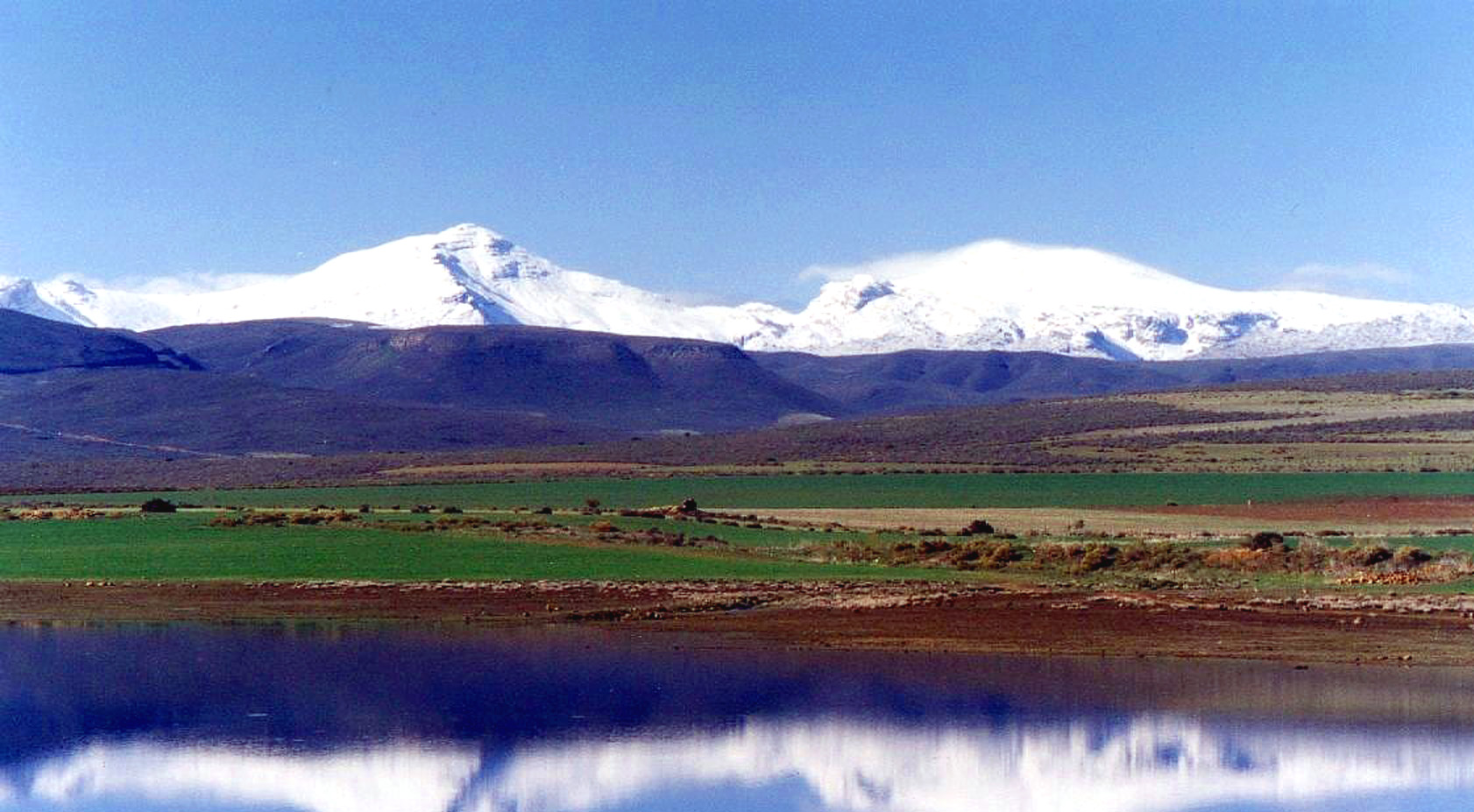
Matroosberg in the Hex River Mountains on the south-eastern flank of the Ceres valley
