= Matt Romao =

South African rugby union player

Matt Romão
- Born: 28 July 2005 (age 21) Springbok, South Africa
- Height: 190 cm (6 ft 3 in)
- Weight: 107 kg (236 lb; 16 st 12 lb)
- School: Drostdy Technical High School

Rugby union career
- Position: Flanker
- Current team: Sharks / Sharks (Currie Cup)
Senior career
Years	Team	Apps	(Points)
2024–	Sharks (Currie Cup)		
2025–	Sharks	5	(0)
- Correct as of 11 January 2026
International career
Years	Team	Apps	(Points)
2025	South Africa U20	7	(0)
- Correct as of 11 January 2026

Matt Romão (born 28 July 2005) is a South African rugby union player, who plays for the Sharks and Sharks (Currie Cup). His preferred position is flanker.

== Early career ==
Romão is from Springbok, South Africa and attended Drostdy Technical High School in Worcester. His performances earned him selection for the Boland side at Craven Week in 2023, earning selection for South Africa Schools in the process. He joined up with the Sharks academy in 2024, helping their U21 side win the U21 cup in 2025. In 2024, he earned selection for the South Africa U19 side, and then selection for the South Africa U20 side in 2025.

== Professional career ==
Romão joined up with the Sharks ahead of the 2024 Currie Cup Premier Division, making his Currie Cup debut that year. He would also feature for the Sharks in the 2025 edition. He would debut for the full Sharks side in the 2025–26 United Rugby Championship, featuring in the match against Connacht. Romão was named as Man of the Match on 17 January 2026, as the Sharks beat ASM Clermont Auvergne in the 2025–26 European Rugby Champions Cup.
