= Worcester Gymnasium =

Coordinates: 33.6427°S 19.4376°E

- Worcester, Western Cape; South Africa

Information
- School type: Public & Boarding
- Motto: DILIGENTIA
- Religious affiliation: Christianity
- Established: February 1992
- Principal: Charl Schoeman
- Grades: 8–12
- Gender: Boys & Girls
- Age: 14 to 18
- Enrollment: 1,000 pupils
- Language: Afrikaans, English
- Schedule: 07:30 - 14:00
- Campus: Urban Campus
- Colours: Blue; Maroon; White
- Mascot: Bosvark (warthog)
- Rival: Drostdy Technical High School
- Website: www.worcgim.co.za

Worcester Gymnasium is a secondary school established in 1992 in Worcester, South Africa. It was created through the amalgamation of two previous schools, Worcester High School and the Worcester East Commercial High School. In the Apartheid regime, it was known as one of the Model C type schools. Currently, the school has nearly 1,000 learners of extremely diverse cultures, truly representative of the new South Africa.

Worcester Gymnasium has a proud academic record, maintaining an average matric pass rate of over 95% in recent years. The majority of the matric learners pass with the requirements for further studies at university level while nearly all pass with the requirements for other tertiary studies. Worcester Gymnasium is a dual medium school instructing in English and Afrikaans. The matric class of 2020 were the first class to have a 100% pass rate, despite the COVID-19 pandemic disrupting the lives of many.

The school balances this academic record with an excellent sporting tradition. Their learners often form the core of the North Boland teams in various sporting codes, such as cricket, hockey, rugby, netball and athletics. Numerous learners go on to represent provincial and national teams; in 2012 nearly 70 learners earned provincial colors or higher.

== History ==
The history of Worcester Gymnasium dates back to the 1870s.

Boys High

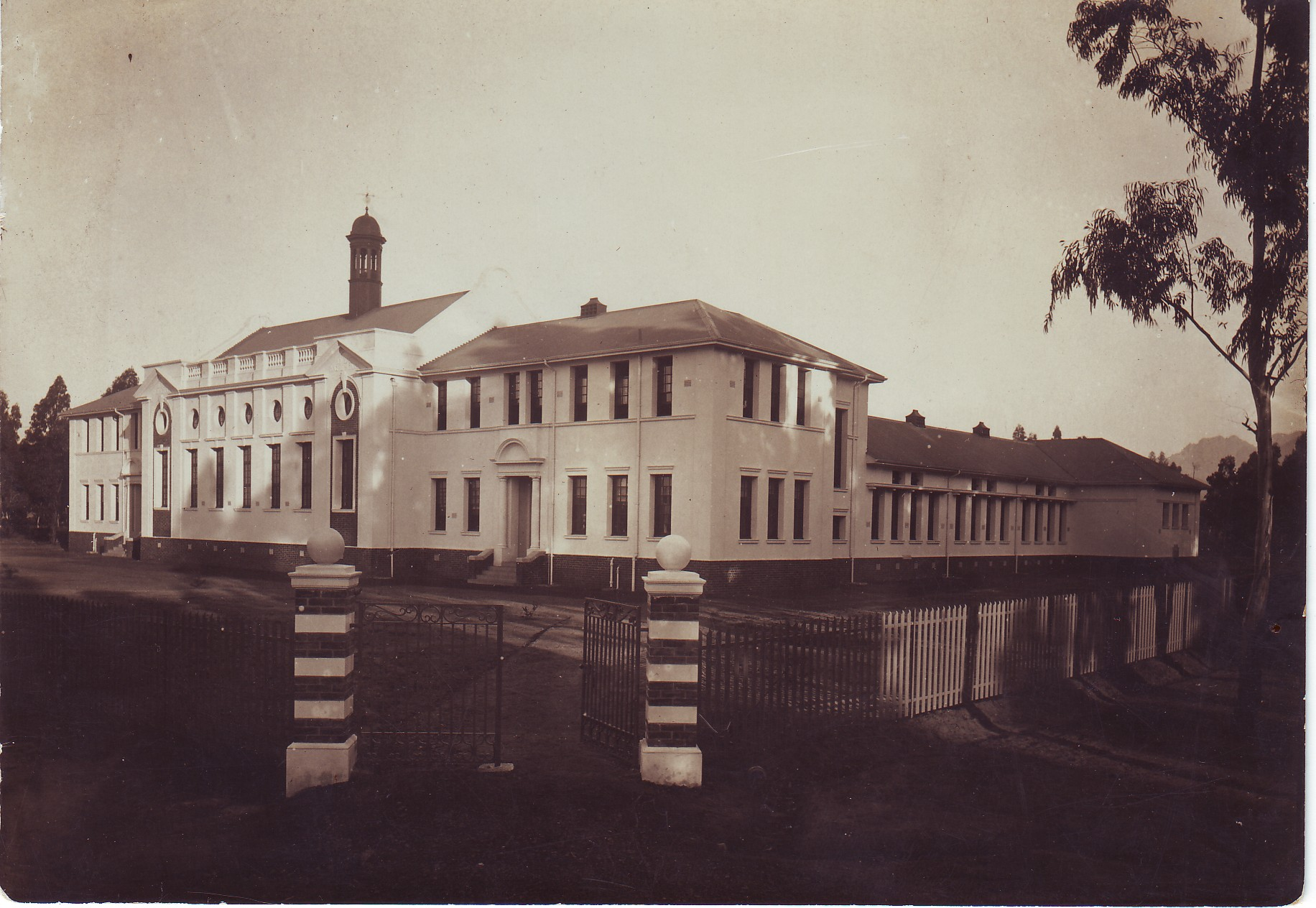
Boys High, 1913.

Schooling started in Worcester when in 1824, the Worcester Public School was started. The school had both male and female learners. It closed on 1 July 1873. The school did not technically close, since its teachers and learners stayed the same when on 2 July 1873 the Non-denominational Boys' Public School was started with 78 boys. It was situated on the corner of High and Baring Street. In 1899 the Boy's Public School became known as Boy's High and was moved to its current location. A school for the girls from the Worcester Public School was only started in January 1876 with 16 girls. This Boys' school, as well as the Girls' High School, later became two of the better-known schools in the Cape Province. In 1908 the school (Boy's High) had 4 principals in the one year – one for each of the four terms. The schoolwork suffered as a result. Of the 21 matrics of that year only 15 were allowed to sit for the year-end exam. Of these 15 only 6 passed; all scraping through with 3rd class passes. During the following 60 years the school had only 4 principals. Some of the old "boys" were actually girls. Between 1918 and 1940 a total of 355 girls registered and attended classes as full-time pupils of Boys High. They attended the commercial course, which became the basis of the Worcester Commercial High School, established in 1941.

=== 1972 Amalgamation ===
In 1968 a commemorative journal was compiled to celebrate Boys High before its amalgamation with Girls High. In the light of the changing modern school system, and the demand for co-ed schools, Boys' High school and Girls' High school amalgamated in 1972 and formed Worcester High School, which was built on the site of the old Boy's Primary School; next to Boy's High building. The Boy's Primary, built in 1931, was demolished to make room for Worcester High School. It was later rebuilt at another location, and is now known as Worcester Primary School. Another result of the amalgamation was the establishment of the high school Hoerskool Montana.

=== 1992 Amalgamation ===
After operating for 20 years, Worcester High School amalgamated once more with Worcester East High (previously known as Worcester Commercial High), and formed Worcester Gymnasium in 1992.

=== Traditions ===
Worcester Gymnasium has adopted many traditions from its ancestor schools such as "40 Days" and Parade Day. The annual "Parade Day" is an event where the matriculants parade through town on their final school day. It was a tradition that the old Boy's High would partake in starting in 1905. The old Boy's would wear straw hats, black suits fit with bow ties and carry a cane as they marched through town. In later years the girls from Girl's High would join in. Another staple of the schools' culture is the biennial musicals, hosted in the town hall. Past productions include Shrek (2016), Aladdin (2018), FABBALOUS (2022) and High School Musical (2024).

== Principals ==
Boy's High

- Mr. H. Hill (1889-1906)
- Mr. P. Roos (1908-1910)
- Mr. B.P. Eybers (c.1910-c.1939)
- Mr. S.J Engelbrecht (c.1939- c.1949)
- Mr. L. Stassen (c.1950-1958)
- Mr. JWL. Van Huyssteen (1959-1971)

Worcester High School

- Mr. JWL. Van Huyssteen (1972-1976)
- Mr. Kruger (1977-1980s)
- Mr. W. Theron (1980s-1991)

Worcester Gymnasium

- Mr. W. Theron (1992–1997)
- Dr. H. VD Westhuizen (1997–2010)
- Mr. C. Schoeman (2011–2025)

== Extra ==
It has a boys hostel, called Brandwacht, as well as a Girls Hostel, called Seminarie. The school's mascot is a bosvark (warthog).
