= Dutch Reformed Church, Worcester =

Church in Worcester, South Africa

Dutch Reformed Church
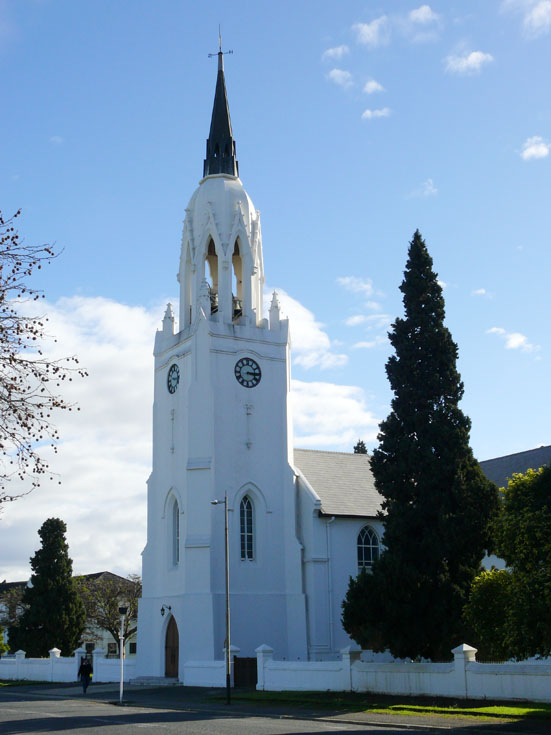
- Location: Worcester
- Country: South Africa
- Denomination: Nederduits Gereformeerde Kerk

History
- Founded: 1821

Architecture
- Functional status: Church

The Dutch Reformed Church in Worcester is the 14th oldest Dutch Reformed Church and the 12th oldest in the Synod of the Western Cape.

Three directions in particular have determined the history of the approximately 200-year-old Worcester congregation, namely the spiritual revival with its beneficial consequences in the social and educational fields, the interest of the congregation in the missionary cause, and in the middle of the 20th century, the new struggle that the church began with the problems of industrialization and steady urbanization.

The congregation was founded on 25 January 1821, three years after the town was founded on the farms Langerug and Roode Draai. The congregation went through its formative years under the leadership of Rev. Henry Sutherland, who served the congregation for 36 years. Then the church building (consecrated on 3 February 1832) and parsonage were erected, and the beautiful pulpit, carved by two De Vos brothers, was donated to the congregation. Although not an outstanding scholar, Rev. Sutherland excelled in the prayer life, piety, and gentleness, which were the hallmark of the Scottish ministers.

The arrival of Rev. Andrew Murray preceded the revival, but only after his departure, in the days of his brother William, was the lasting fruit seen. In 1875 the Worcester Seminary for young girls was opened, which developed into the Girls' School with nine hundred girls. Rev. William Murray was attracted to the plight of the deaf and blind, and six years later a school for such was opened under the direction of Mr. B.J.G. de la Bat. When the number of blind pupils increased, a separate school for the blind was established with Mr. M.J. Besselaar at the head.

The congregation played a large part in the Foreign Mission. Rev. Murray encouraged the youth to give themselves to the Missionary Cause. His own son, Dr. William Murray, became a leader in Nyasaland (Malawi) and Rev. J.G. Botha in the Sudan. For the large number of young Boer prisoners of war who returned from St. Helena, and wanted to devote their lives to the Missionary Cause, a training school was established in the Old Drosdy under the leadership of Rev. A.F. Louw. The congregation was also one of the first to build a purpose-built hall for Sunday school work.

From the Great Depression (1929–32) to after the Second World War (1939–45), life in Worcester changed dramatically. The membership more than doubled and in 1948 exceeded the five thousand mark. The town area expanded incredibly just after the war, new industries were established, and the rural congregation encountered urban problems. Thus, it became necessary to establish five more congregations in the town between 1951 and 1984: Worcester-Audenberg, Worcester-Brandwag, Worcester-Noord, Worcester-Oos, Worcester-Vallei. In 1987, Worcester-De la Bat, a congregation for deaf members, also came into being.

== Sources ==
- (in Dutch) Maeder, ds. G.A. en Zinn, Christian. 1917. Ons Kerk Album. Kaapstad: Ons Kerk Album Maatschappij Bpkt.
- (in Afrikaans) Olivier, ds. P.L. (samesteller), 1952. Ons gemeentelike feesalbum. Kaapstad en Pretoria: N.G. Kerk-uitgewers.
