= Worcester, South Africa =

Worcester
- Town
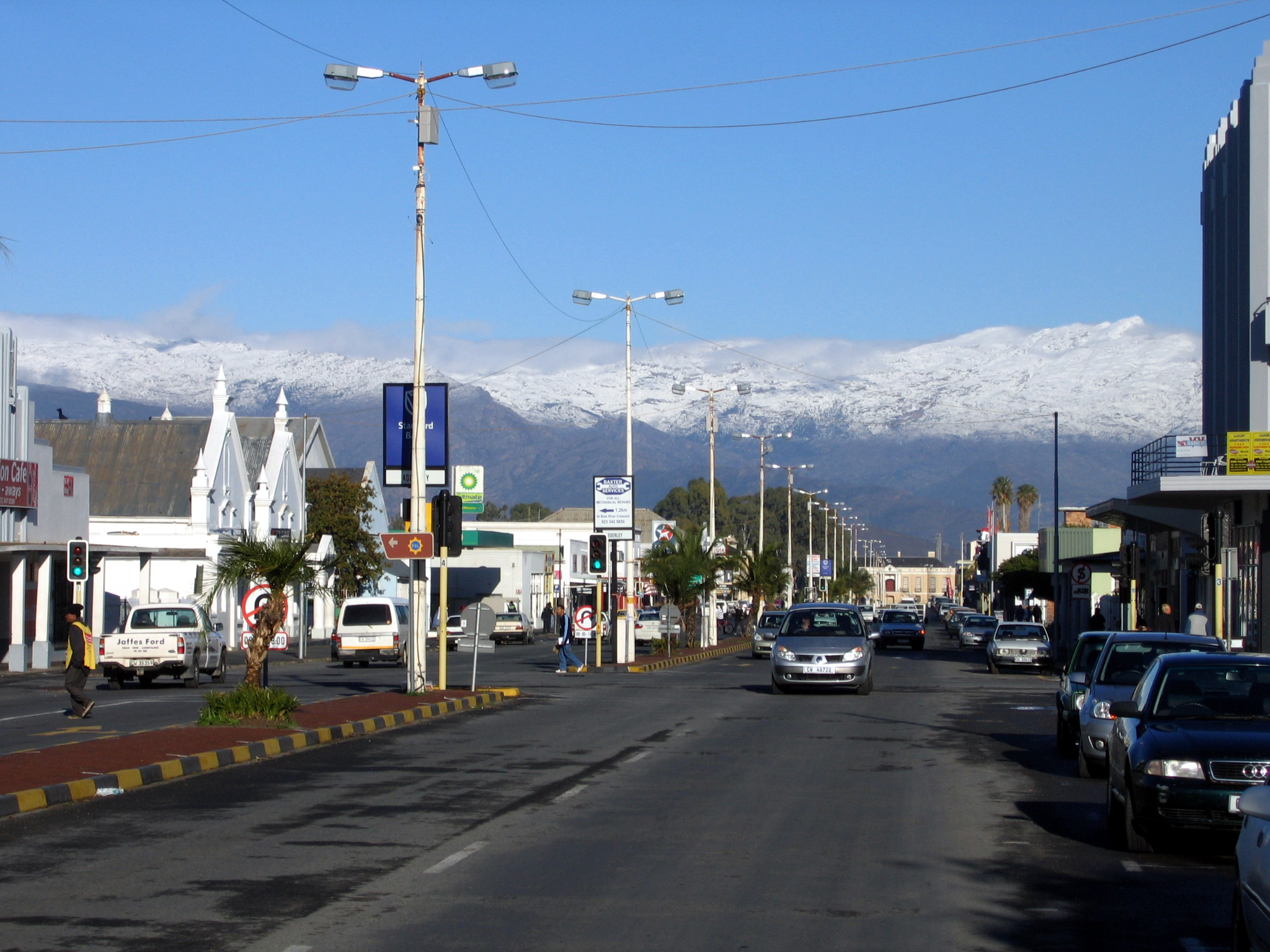
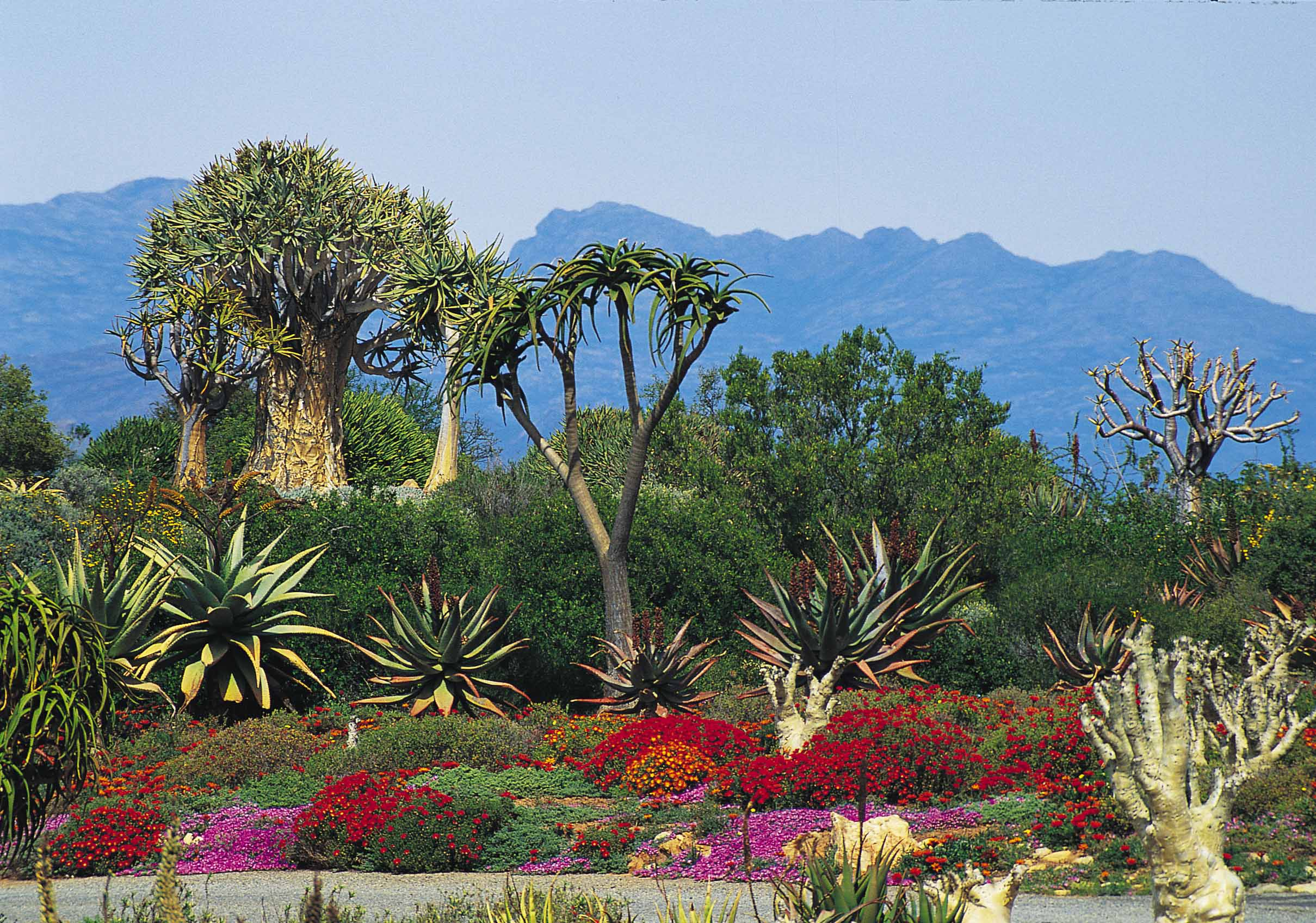
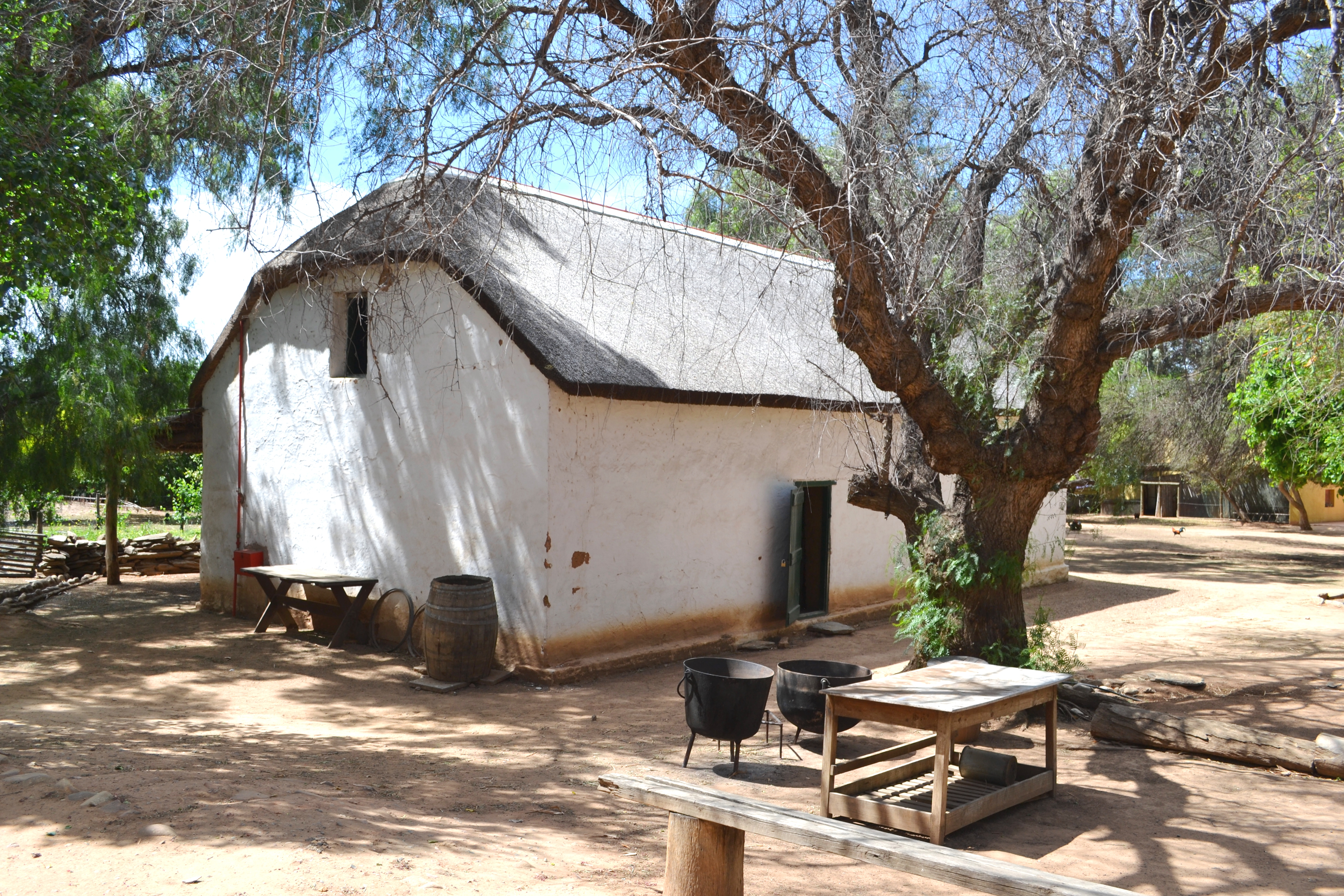
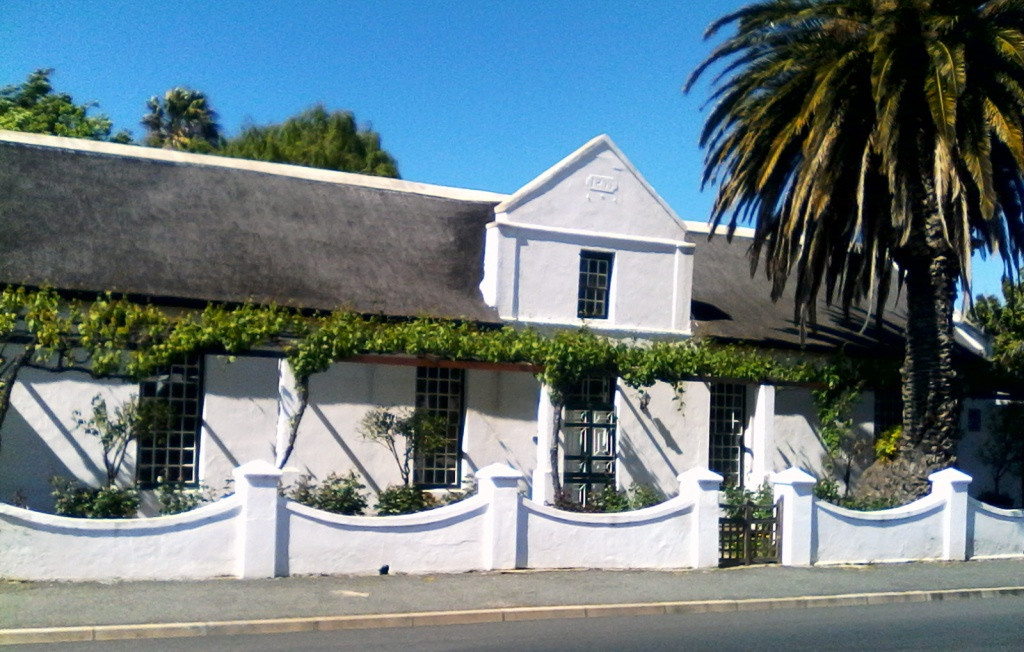
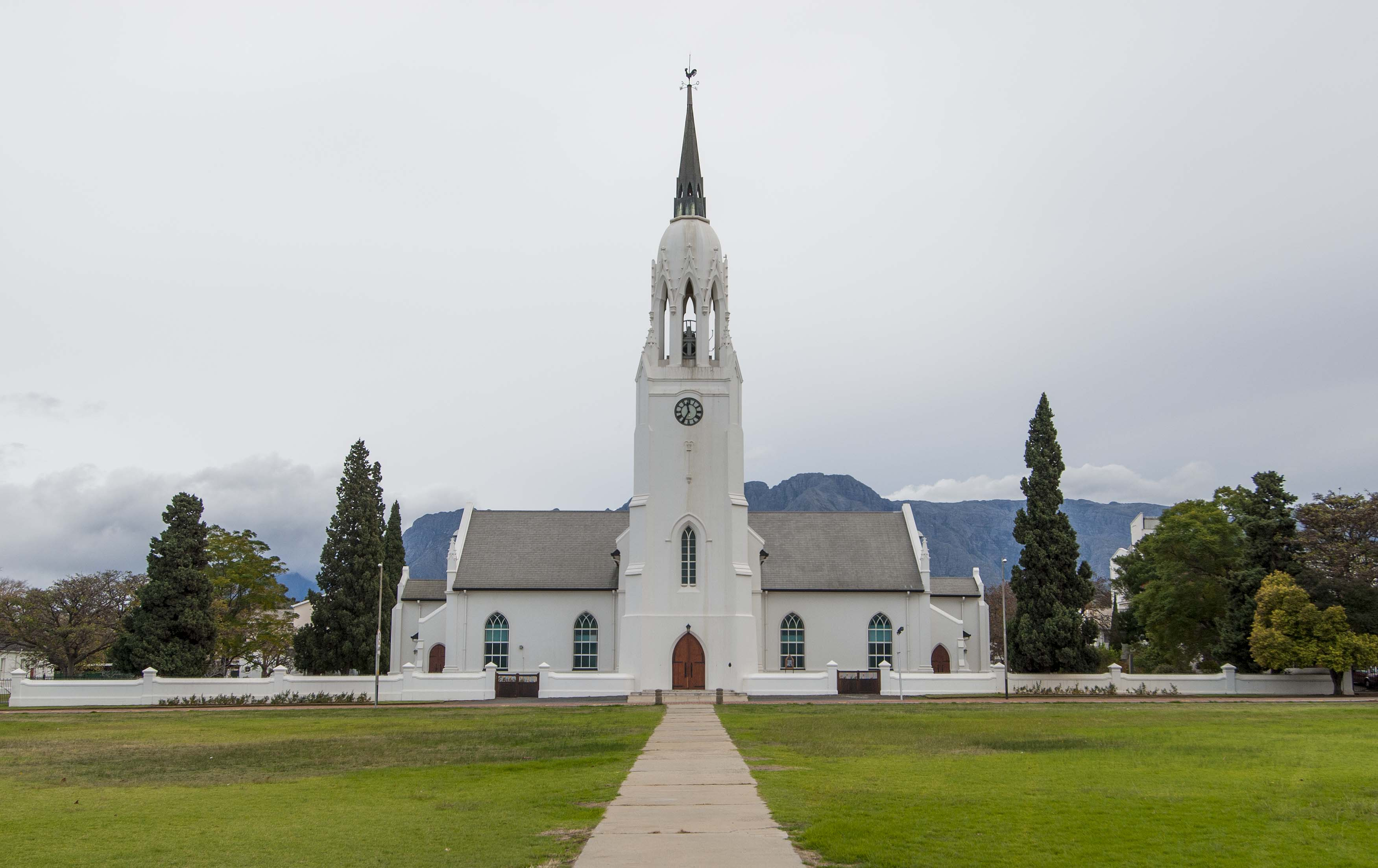
- From top, High Street in the Worcester downtown area. Karoo Desert National Botanical Garden (centre left). Kleinplasie Historical Village (centre right). A historic home (bottom left). The Worcester Dutch Reformed Church (bottom right).

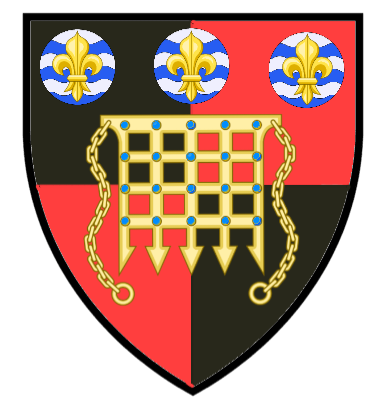
- Coat of arms

- Location within Western Cape Location within South Africa Location within Africa
- Coordinates: 33°38′42″S 19°26′37″E
- Country: South Africa
- Province: Western Cape
- District: Cape Winelands
- Municipality: Breede Valley
- Established: 1820

Government

Area
  - Total: 73.2 km^{2} (28.3 sq mi)

Population (2020)
  - Total: 127,597
  - Density: 1,740/km^{2} (4,510/sq mi)

Racial makeup (2011)
  - Black African: 25.4%
  - Coloured: 55.7%
  - Indian/Asian: 0.8%
  - White: 17.0%
  - Other: 1.1%

First languages (2011)
  - Afrikaans: 73.1%
  - Xhosa: 19.1%
  - English: 3.7%
  - Sotho: 1.7%
  - Other: 2.4%
- Time zone: UTC+2 (SAST)
- Postal code (street): 6850
- PO box: 6849
- Area code: 023
- Website: www.breedevallei.gov.za

Worcester (/ˈwʊstər/ WUUST-ər) is a town in the Western Cape, South Africa. It is located 120 kilometres (75 mi) north-east of Cape Town on the N1 highway north to Johannesburg.

Being the largest town in the Western Cape's interior region, it serves as the administrative capital of the Breede Valley Local Municipality and as the regional headquarters for most central and Provincial Government Departments. Its mayor is Antoinette Steyn. The town also serves as the hub of the Western Cape's interior commercial, distribution and retail activity with a shopping mall, well developed central business district and infrastructure.

Worcester is located at an elevation of 220 metres (720 ft) and can be reached by road either travelling on the N1 highway through the Huguenot Tunnel or by driving through spectacular mountain passes. From Cape Town Du Toitskloof, from Wellington Bainskloof, from Malmesbury, Western Cape Nieuwekloof, from Ceres Mitchells, from Robertson Goree, from Hermanus Rooihoogte and from Johannesburg Hex River, with vistas over the Hex River Valley.

Geographically, the district is delimited mainly by mountains; to the southwest lies the massive Stettyns mountain range with an annual rainfall in excess of 2000 mm. To the west lie the Du Toitskloof Mountains and northwest lies the Slanghoek, Little Drakenstein, Elandskloof and Lemiet mountain ranges. To the north rises the Hex River Mountains which include the towering peaks of Chavonnes, Brandwacht, Fonteintjiesberg and Audensberg. Northeast of the town the colourful Keerom Mountain runs into the Langeberg range.

Worcester and its surroundings form part of the Breede River catchment area, which is fed by a number of smaller rivers supplemented by the run-off from the winter snows in the mountains. The district also includes the Hex River Valley.

== History ==
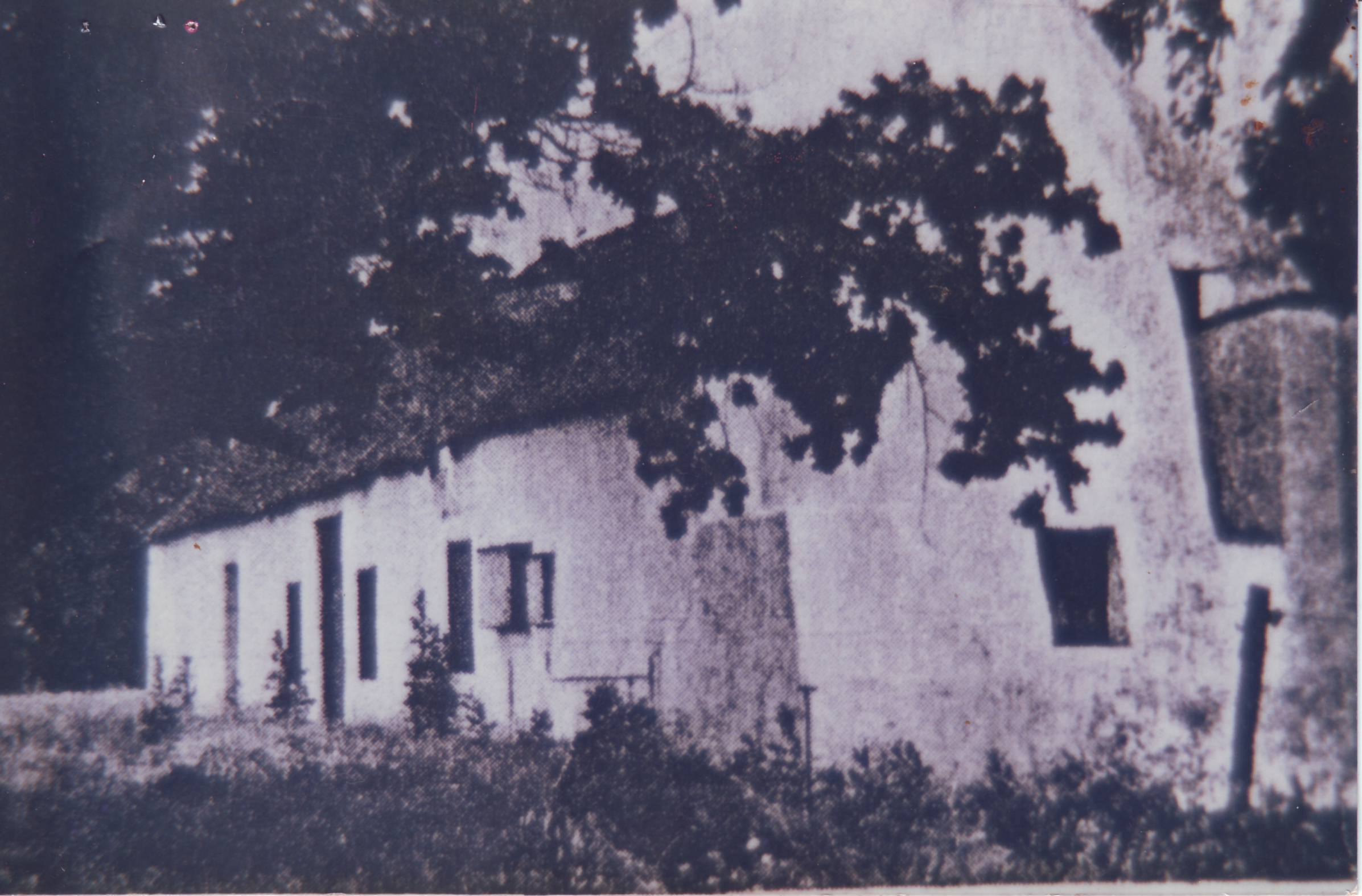
Pokkekraal, Worcester District

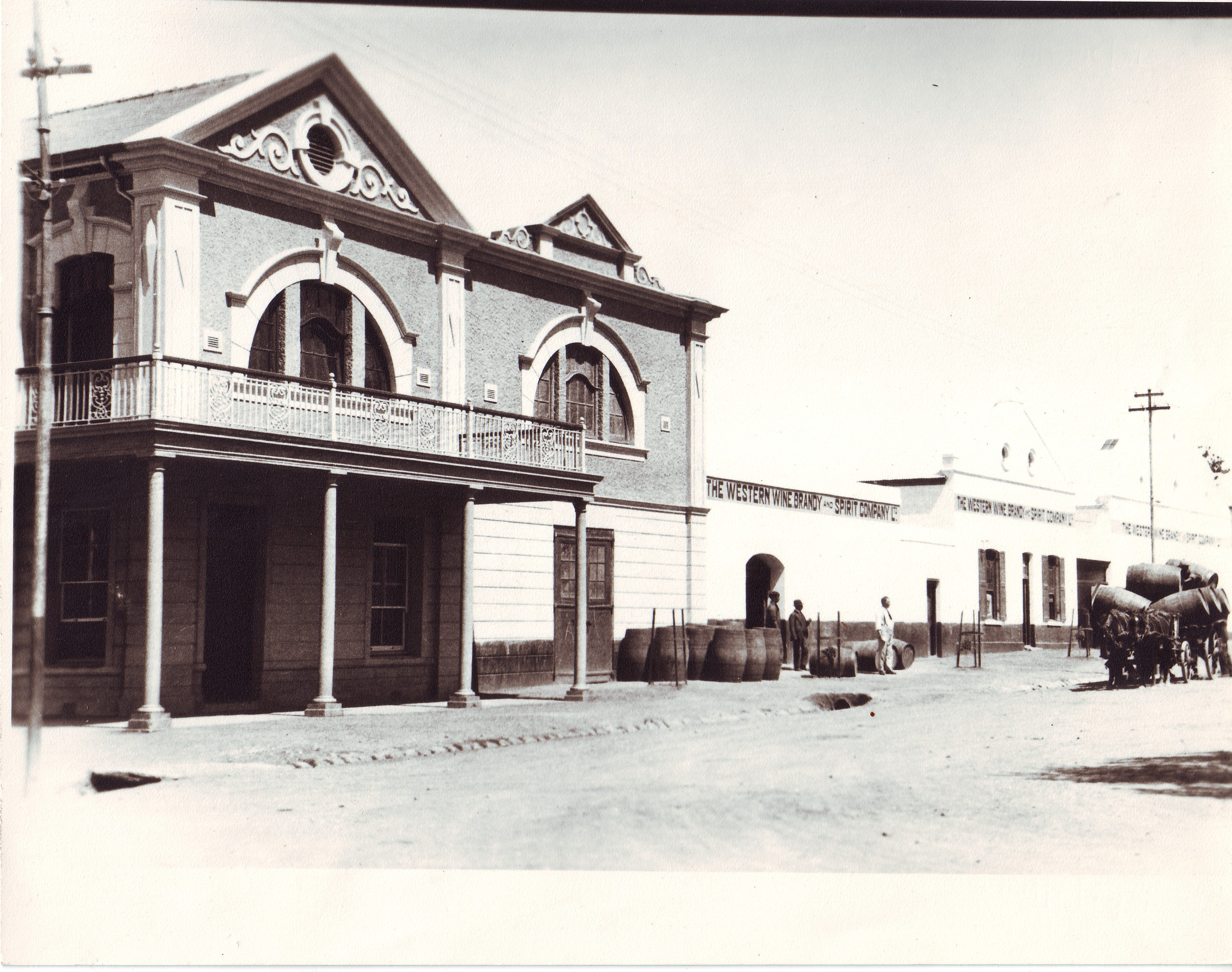
Western Wine and Brandy Company, Porter Street

=== Dutch period ===
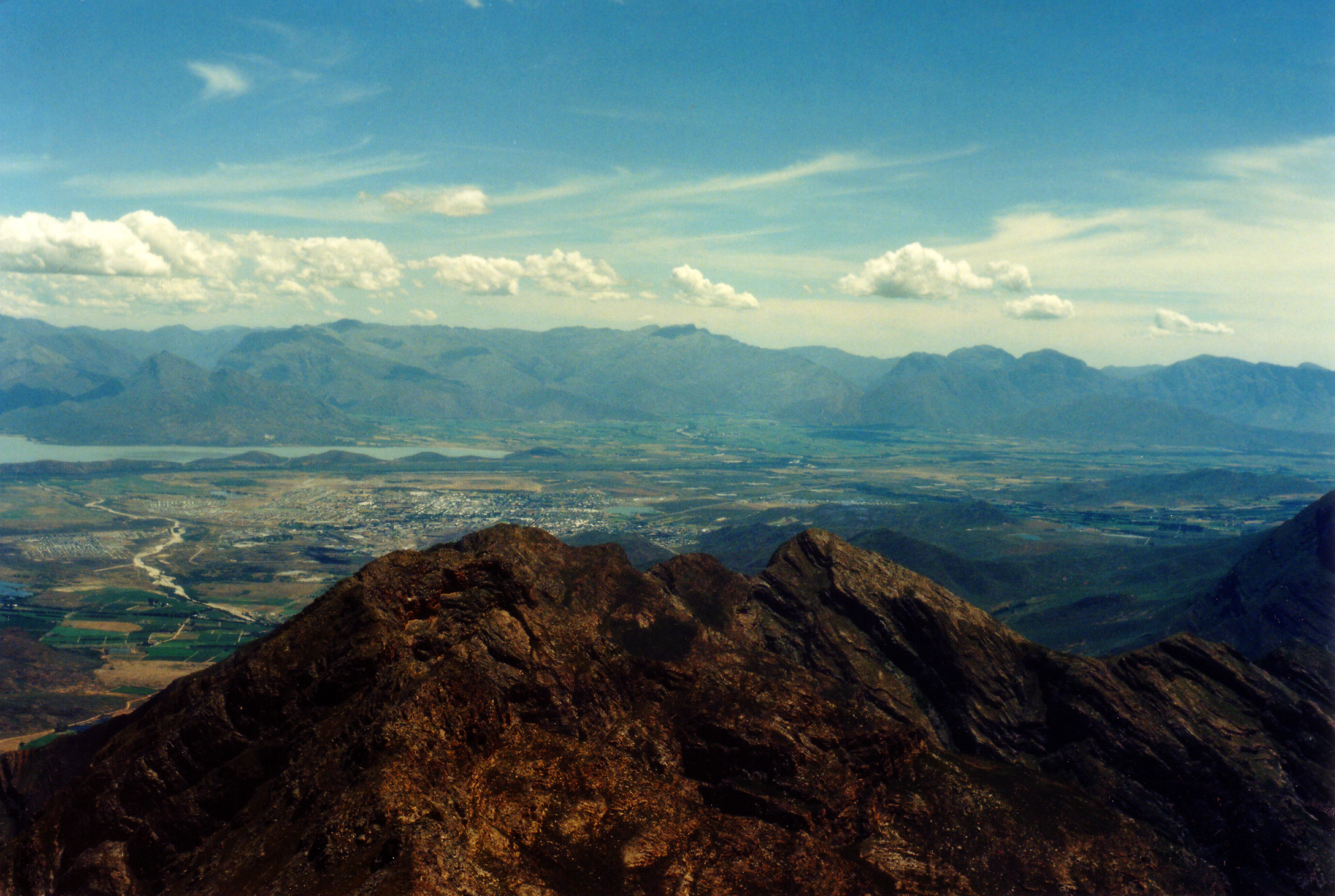
View of Worcester and Breede River Valley from Ben Heatlie peak

In the early days of the Cape's history the main road through the great mountain barrier which stretches northwards from the Hottentots-Holland, Wemmershoek and Slanghoek mountains to the Groot Winterhoek mountains, lay through the Roodezand Pass into the valley of Tulbagh. From here the road gave access in the south-east to "the original great rift valley of Africa" as Jan Smuts once described the Breede River Valley.

Worcester district is as old as hunting grounds and cattle runs go in the Cape, but new as a settled area. Before 1700, the area now known as the Breede River Valley was a hunter's paradise, teeming with game and wild birds. The main source of income, especially the sale of elephant tusks came from hunting licenses issued by the Dutch East India Company. By 1709 European farmers were given grazing rights in the area "over de Breede Rivier." In 1714 the first quitrent farms were released. Settlement in most cases was not on a permanent basis and "Hartebees huisies" were erected. When European settlers first arrived at the later Cape Colony, the Breede River Valley was inhabited by San hunter/gatherers and Khoi livestock farmers. The Gainou, Korannas and Afrikaner tribes traded livestock with the settlers. With the European settlers came the smallpox virus, that would turn into an epidemic for the Khoi people and by 1713 would take its toll on their existence as a people.

European settlement took place at Waay Hoek, Bossiesveld, Kleinbosch, Slanghoek, Brandvalley, Vendutiekraal, Rooye Wal and Doornrivier. The first farms in the Hex River Valley were Kloppersbosch and De Buffelskraal, dating from 1731. With the European settlers came their slaves and eventually so-called free Khoi, who would settle on the farms as labourers.

=== British colonial history ===
With the Cape Colony interior expanding with the settlement of an increasing number of European settlers, Lord Charles Somerset instructed Magistrate Fischer of Tulbagh, to find a location to establish a new deputy magisterial seat during 1818. Fischer duly reported that the two quitrent farms, De Lange Rug and Roodedraai, be bought for this purpose. On 9 January 1819 the Colonial surveyors, Tulleken and Hertzog mapped the two farms and on 4 November, the first official advertisement for the sale of plots was issued. On 28 February 1820, the official date of the establishment of Worcester, 89 of the proclaimed 144 plots were sold. Fischer also reported that "this place becomes more important when the new road over the Franschhoek Mountains will be completed." The African Rifles Regiment started construction of this road in 1819.

A winter storm in 1822 caused damage to the town of Tulbagh. Captain Charles Trappes recommended to Somerset that the magisterial seat be moved to the new town.

By 1830, 329 farms were cultivated in the district and by 1832 the town of Worcester was becoming a frontier town with the Market Square being used for stock sales. Many a fine animal changed ownership in the days when Worcester was a jumping-off spot for the "togryers" (transport riders) of the 19th century.

By the 1850s the necessity for the formation of a hamlet west of the Breede River had become clear; the ward was cut off from Worcester during the rainy season when the river burst it banks regularly. The farm Aan-de-Smalblaar was transported to Johannes Petrus Jordaan on 23 July 1858. Jan Jordaan divided a portion of the farm into 57 residential plots and these were sold at a Public Auction on 11 June 1859. The hamlet of Rawsonville was named for William Rawson, the Cape Colonial Secretary.

German settlers employed as "tagloners" on the surrounding farms from 1860 onwards, would soon use the abundance of fertile soil, water and their skilled labour to see the area evolve from livestock farming to cultivated land, orchards and vineyards. By 1865 the production from the flourishing vineyards compared favourably with the Stellenbosch and Paarl valleys. Much of the crop was dried for raisins, and this continued to be an important aspect of the local industry into the 20th century. The decline in the demand for raisins after the Second World War persuaded most of the farmers to convert to wine-grape growing: and in response to this change an extensive network of co-operative wineries sprang up. Today the Breede River Valley is the largest wine-producing region in South Africa, contributing almost 25% of the country's viticultural output. The Olof Bergh Solera Brandy Cellar and the KWV Brandy Cellar form part of the South African Brandy Route and 33 wineries produce and bottle in the Worcester area.

The first export grapes planted in the Hex River Valley dates from 1875. Today the Hex River Valley produces more than 17 million cartons of table grapes per annum. In the dryer southern regions of the valley, Olive production have also been added in recent years.

Central to this agricultural production, is the Greater Brandvlei Dam, with a capacity of 342 million cubic metres. The dam was completed in 1936, fully extended by 1987 and provides water to various irrigation schemes in the valley.

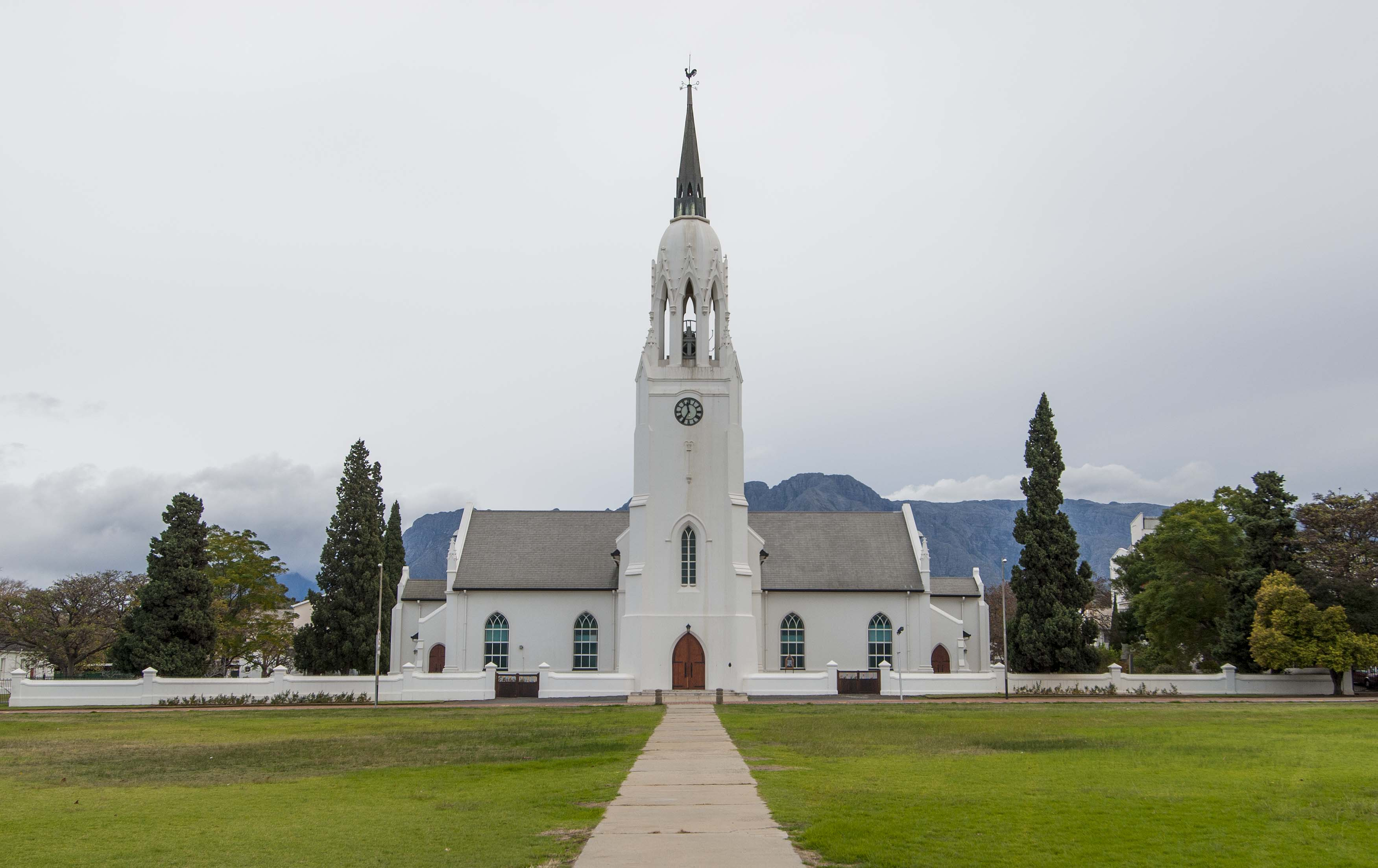
Dutch Reformed Church, commonly known as "Die Moederkerk"

Lord Charles Somerset named the new town for his eldest brother, the Marquis of Worcester and by 1840, 132 of the original 144 plots were sold.

Captain Charles Trappes was responsible for the planning of the town. A dubious character in some ways, Trappes, however, was far in advance of his time when he laid out the wide streets and town blocks with vision and a high regard for squares. Trappes made the early builders put the houses close to the street and soon these builders would develop their own style of gables. An early visitor, James Backhouse found 1300 people living in the rising town in 1840. According to the 1844 Cape Almanac, William Watson ran one of the best hotels in the country and Bishop Gray said in 1845 that the houses were a great distance from each other.

The Worcester District Council was proclaimed on 20 December 1855. The boundaries were northwest – Kleinberg, northeast – Bloutoring, southeast – Mowers Heights, southwest – Roodehoogte and west – Du Toitskloof Mountains.

Sub division of the original plots dates back to the 1860s when the town experienced its first economic boom. By the 1890s, when there was a downturn in economic fortune the population grew at a considerable rate, as landless people moved to the town. Small industry, business and residence still operated within the original boundaries of the town. During the 1890s Worcester's community would also evolve into an uptown section for rich and middle-class people and a downtown section for so-called poor Whites and Coloured people. Even the Dutch Reformed Congregation would censure European and Coloured people living under desegregated circumstances.

Worcester received Municipal status on 30 September 1895. A Town Council, consisting of 8 members governed the town.

=== Recent history ===
When Black Africans returned to Worcester at the end of the First World War, they were mainly employed as cheap labour for new construction programs springing up around town. By 1936, 1271 Black African people were living in the Worcester district.

At the end of the Second World War, housing in Worcester was at a premium and Worcester had a squatter camp at Parkersdam. It was also during these years that Worcester started to expand with new residential areas and an industrial area. The apartheid regime responded by total segregation of the different communities.

In the Coloured area 1350 sub-economic dwellings and 584 economic dwellings were built in Esselen Park Uitbreiding (extension), Roodewal and Riverview. In addition, 230 plots were sold in Esselen Park for the erection of dwellings by purchasers. Mostly Indian traders were forced to move their businesses from the declared White areas and resettle in the downtown business district of Durban Street.

The Zweletemba township, to the southeast of the town, was awarded 524 sub-economic, 300 economic dwellings and two hostel schemes of 1274 units for single persons. Due to the policy of Apartheid, these people were not considered to be permanent residents and it was only after the abolishment of influx control in 1986 that the township population really exploded. In 1985, students protested over Afrikaans being a dominant language at school. Riots broke out and several students were shot by police in Robertson Road. A student named Nkosana Nation Bahumi was killed due to the protests.

A further 67 sub-economic and 137 economic dwellings were developed in the White Areas and affluent residential areas towards the north of the town. The early years of Apartheid would also see the old town being transformed into a central business district. Most of the character and charm of the old buildings was lost as the then government and society replaced these buildings with new administrative and retail buildings, based on "New-World" consumerism. Grand Apartheid would leave the community divided and in segregated living areas.

A separate Management Committee for Coloured People was introduced on 2 April 1965. With the coming of democracy to South Africa, Worcester now forms part of the Breede Valley Local Municipality.

=== Timeline ===
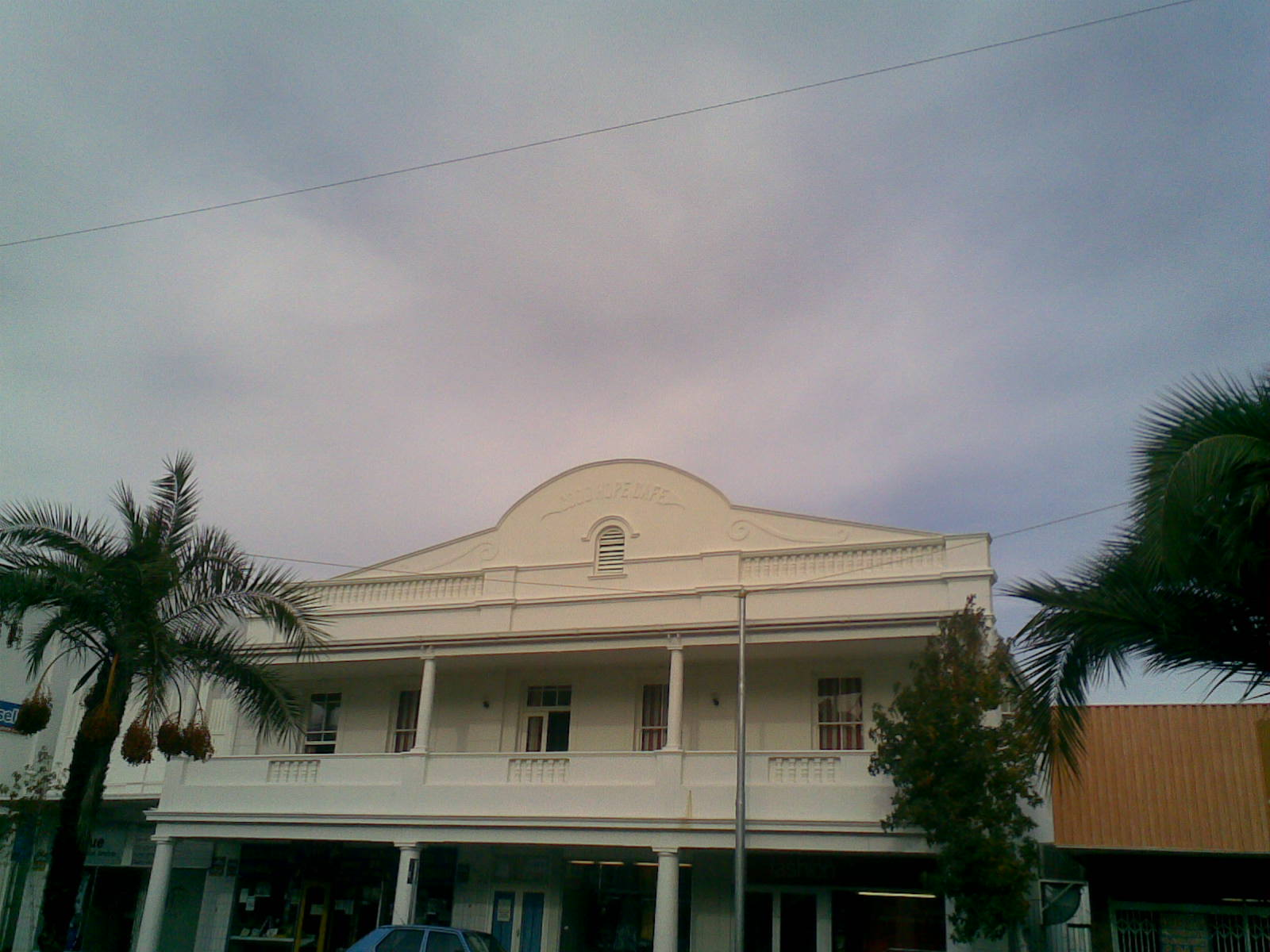
Good Hope Building High Street

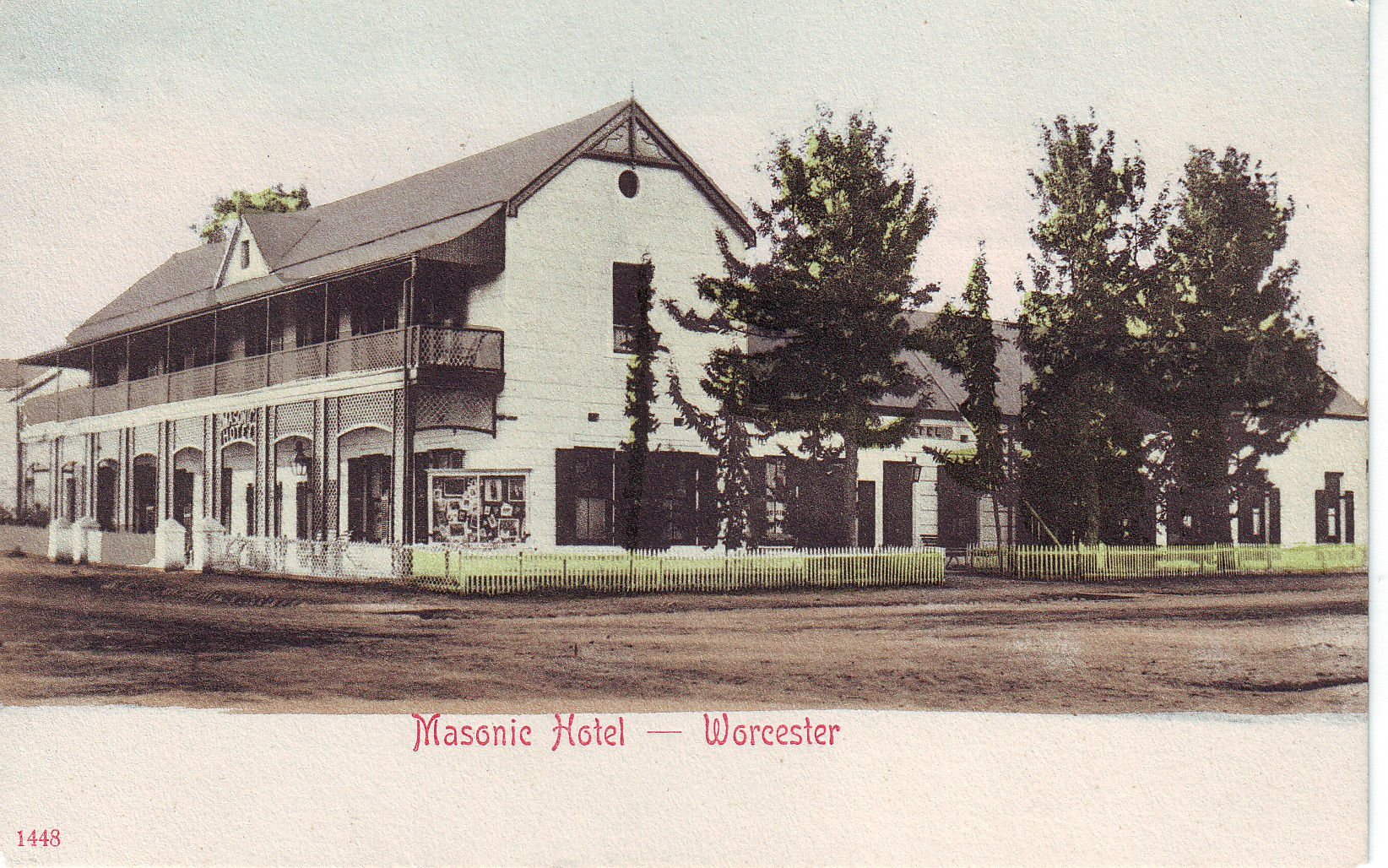
Old Masonic Hotel c/o High- and Stockenström Streets

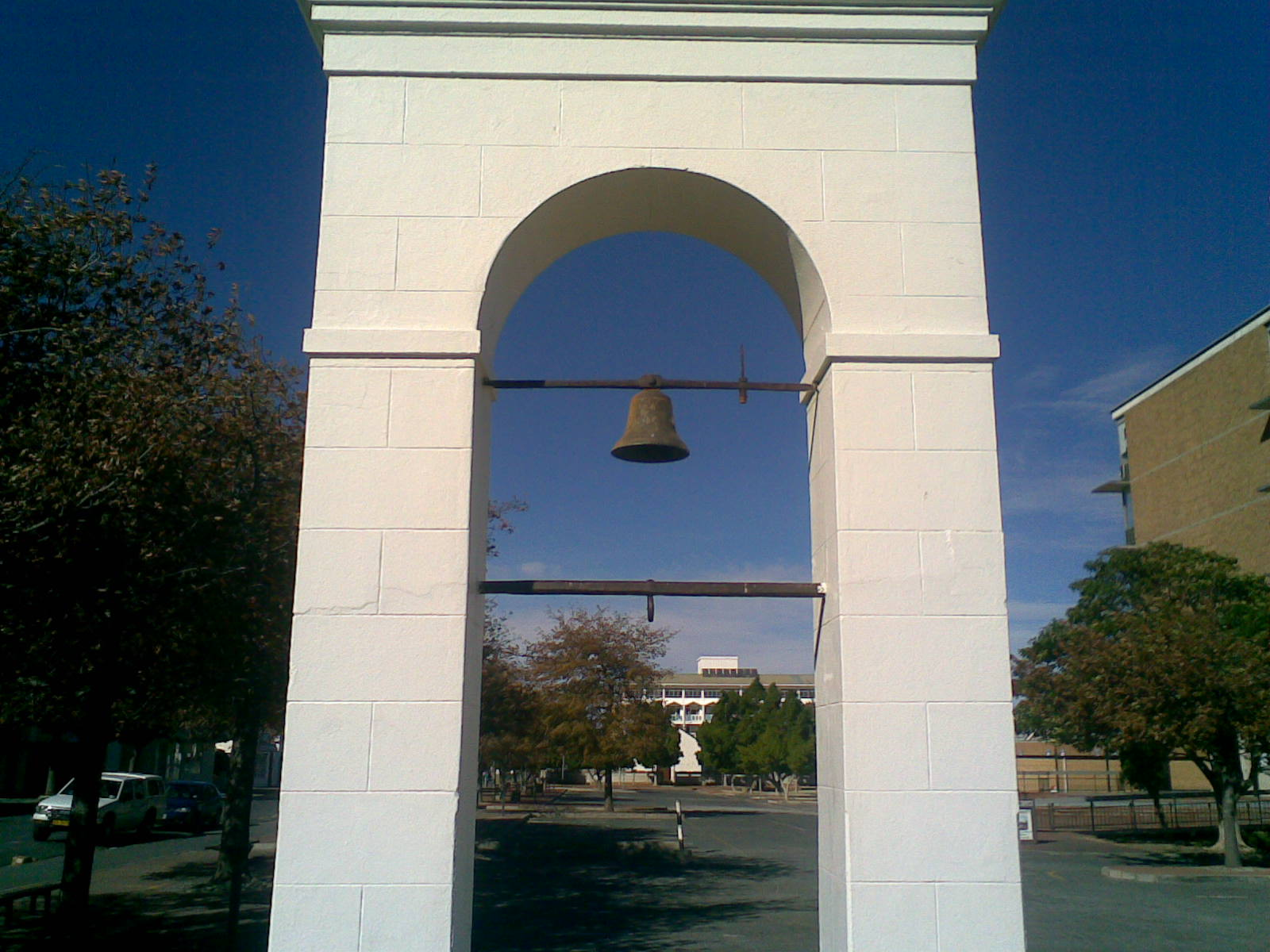
Slave Bell on Market Square 1822

- 1841 – Mail coaches from Cape Town, via Stellenbosch, Paarl and then continuing to Swellendam.
- 1850 – Sheets of galvanised (corrugated) iron first imported to Worcester.
- 1857 – The Worcester Volunteers Regiment was formed, consisting of a cavalry squadron and an infantry company. This regiment eventually formed part of the Regiment Westelike Provinsie.
- 1861 – The first Town Hall was completed.
- 1865 – Music Society formed, and by 1880 concerts took place regularly.
- 1870 – Worcester's Oldest School was created namely "Boys High School". In 1972 this merged with Girls High School to establish "Worcester High School", renamed to "Worcester Gymnasium" in 1992, on the same site.
- 1873 – The Cape Government took the decision to run the Cape Town – Beaufort railway line through Worcester, rather than Tulbagh or any of the other nearby competing towns. This decision has had an enormous influence on Worcester's growth.
- 1876 – Opening of the Worcester railway station.
- 1876 – First telegraph office and thrice-weekly postal service.
- 1876 – Formation of the Worcester lodge of Freemasons.
- 1877 to 1885 – At this time, while the railway was under construction to Kimberley, travellers to the Kimberley diamond fields were carried from Cape Town to Worcester in one day, spent the night at a hotel, and then carried on the next day to the railhead, where coaches met the trains to take passengers on to Kimberley. Well known mining magnates such as Barney Barnato, Cecil John Rhodes and Alfred Beit stayed over in Worcester on many occasions.
- 1882 to 1890 – Due to a shortage of coal a forestry was established in Worcester to provide wood for use in the steam engine furnaces. The trees chosen were blue gums which helped to reduce the import of coal.
- 1886 – The first telephone was installed.
- 1891 – Worcester Gold Mining Company Ltd founded. The company developed a gold mine at Barberton which eventually closed down, with substantial losses to the share-holders.
- 1895 – International Organization of Good Templars built a community hall in Porter Street, dedicated to the abstinence from alcohol.
- 1900 – On 6 December a mass meeting of some 10,000 people, concerning the Anglo-Boer War took place in Worcester. The chairman, Mr S.C. Cronwright-Schreiner (the husband of Olive Schreiner) attacked Capitalism and was cheered by all and sundry. Australian troops were deployed to maintain law and order.
- 1901 – On 3 January, with Boer commandos in the vicinity, martial law was declared in the Cape Colony, including Worcester
- 1903 – The Worcester Chamber of Commerce was established in April, when 65 town and 44 country members were enrolled free of entrance fee. The first AGM was held in September 1904. On that date the total annual import to SA amounted to £35 million. The exports totalled £25 million per annum. The gross traffic receipts for the Railway Companies came to £3 million and the "European" population of the country stood at 1 million.
- 1903 - On 12 February the "Boere Sending School" opens in the old magistrate's building to train missionaries. This later an industrial school under the name Drostdy Skool and today is Drostdy Technical High School.
- 1904 – Worcester Band, Philharmonic Society and Academy of Music formed.
- 1908 – Good Hope Café and Cinema was started by the first Greek resident of Worcester. Mr Costas Drigos bought the property and by 1920 he sold to the Gianellos brothers. In the early days most meetings of social-, political- or sport organisations were held at the Good Hope Café.
- 1909 – A Boy Scouts troop was established at Worcester
- 1914 – Hospital completed at Hospital Hill, later converted into a Missionary facility "YWAM" in the late 1990s.
- 1914 – The New Cape Central Railway Company donated the NCCR shield for schools rugby matches between Worcester- and Robertson Boys High schools. The schools that grew out of these two schools still compete annually for this shield.
- 1926 – Child Welfare established
- 1959 - Construction on Worcester Correctional Services completes
- 1961 – The Eskom Hex River Power Station, situated at Worcester, electrified the railway track from Cape Town to Beaufort West, making it the longest electrified section in Africa.
- 1961 - Esselen Park High established.
- 1964 - First Worcester Scouts established by John Beukes.
- 1972 - Amalgamation of Boy's High and Girl's High school and the formation of Worcester High School.

== Climate ==
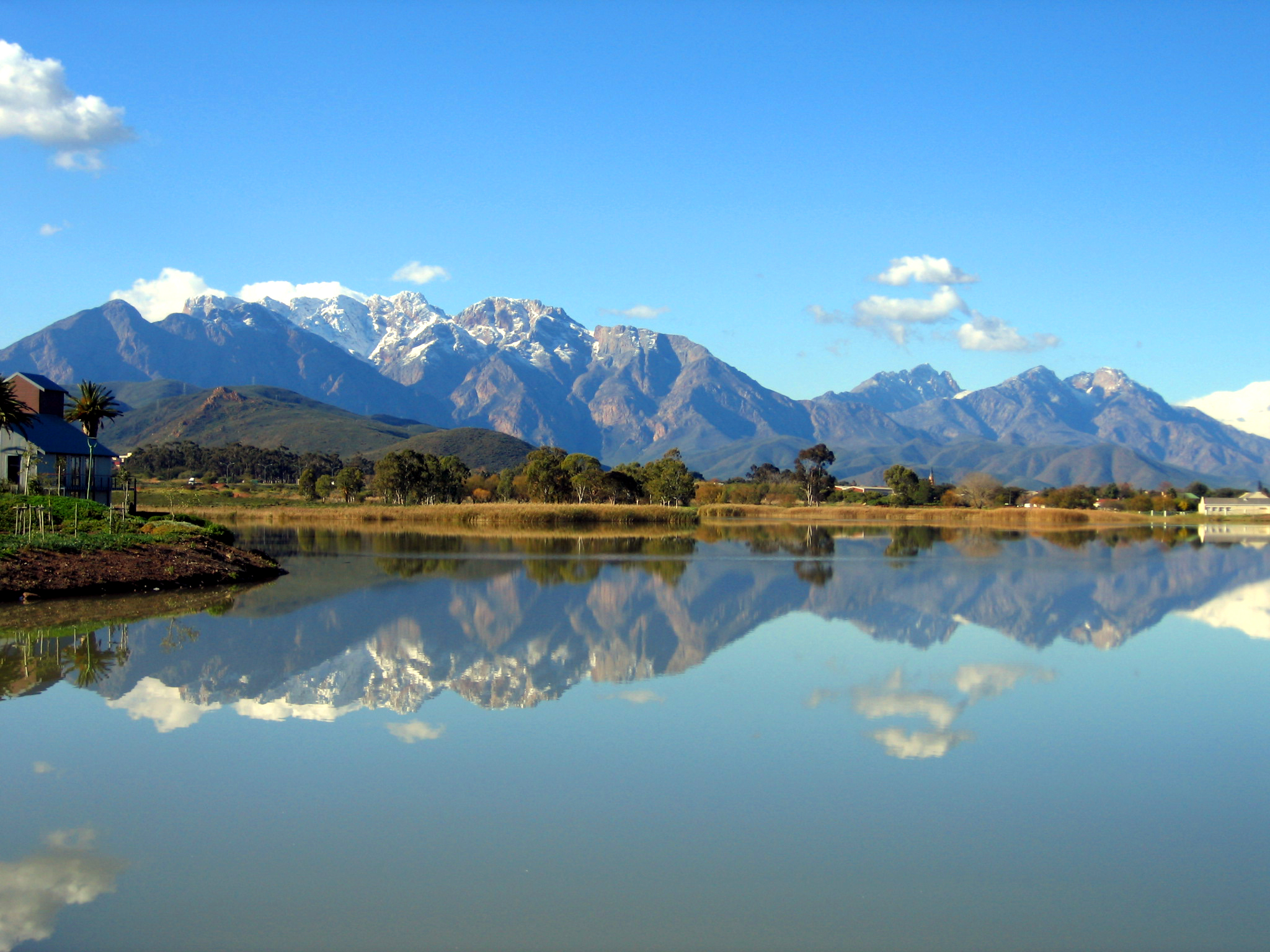
Worcester Dam in mid-winter as viewed from Mountain Mill Mall

Worcester experiences more extremes of temperature than neighbouring Cape Town, as oceanic influences are blocked by the Du Toitskloof and Slanghoek mountain ranges to the west. The daytime maximum in summer averages around 30 °C or 86 °F, but some days in February can reach in excess of 40 °C or 104 °F. Summer is generally dry with the rare late summer thunderstorm, whilst spring and autumn are shoulder seasons of pleasant temperatures ranging from an average 10 °C or 50 °F minimum to a 25 °C or 77 °F maximum, with the occasional rain shower. Winters are generally very windy and often cool to cold with snow being common on the higher lying ground above 1,500 metres or 4,900 feet. Daytime maximums range from 10 to 17 °C (50.0 to 62.6 °F), with minimums hovering at or just above freezing. Winter brings most of Worcester's annual rainfall. The town lies in a curious rain-shadow phenomenon caused by the surrounding high mountains.

There are a number of wards within the Worcester District, reflecting a marked internal variation in soil types and micro-climates. In the Breede River, Botha, Slanghoek and Goudini wards the soils are sandy loams with a varying loose stone content and a fairly high, free water table. Along the river banks in the Nuy, Doornrivier, Aan De Doorns and Overhex wards, fertile alluvial and calcareous clayish soils can be found.

The annual average rainfall in the Slanghoek area is in excess of 1,500 millimetres or 60 inches, in contrast with a low of 300 millimetres or 12 inches in the Nuy and Scherpenheuvel areas to the east and southeast.

Climate data for Worcester, elevation 270 m (890 ft), (1991–2020 normals, extremes 1998–2023)
Month	Jan	Feb	Mar	Apr	May	Jun	Jul	Aug	Sep	Oct	Nov	Dec	Year
Record high °C (°F)	42.7 (108.9)	42.2 (108.0)	41.4 (106.5)	38.3 (100.9)	34.3 (93.7)	30.4 (86.7)	31.1 (88.0)	32.0 (89.6)	37.1 (98.8)	40.9 (105.6)	40.1 (104.2)	43.4 (110.1)	43.4 (110.1)
Mean daily maximum °C (°F)	34.0 (93.2)	34.2 (93.6)	31.6 (88.9)	28.1 (82.6)	24.2 (75.6)	20.2 (68.4)	19.8 (67.6)	20.3 (68.5)	23.2 (73.8)	27.6 (81.7)	29.9 (85.8)	32.7 (90.9)	27.1 (80.9)
Daily mean °C (°F)	25.6 (78.1)	25.7 (78.3)	23.4 (74.1)	20.4 (68.7)	16.9 (62.4)	13.6 (56.5)	12.8 (55.0)	13.4 (56.1)	15.9 (60.6)	19.5 (67.1)	21.7 (71.1)	24.4 (75.9)	19.4 (67.0)
Mean daily minimum °C (°F)	17.1 (62.8)	17.3 (63.1)	15.3 (59.5)	12.6 (54.7)	9.5 (49.1)	6.9 (44.4)	5.8 (42.4)	6.6 (43.9)	8.5 (47.3)	11.4 (52.5)	13.5 (56.3)	16.1 (61.0)	11.7 (53.1)
Record low °C (°F)	10.3 (50.5)	10.1 (50.2)	6.1 (43.0)	3.6 (38.5)	0.0 (32.0)	−0.9 (30.4)	−2.8 (27.0)	−1.0 (30.2)	0.8 (33.4)	1.9 (35.4)	0.0 (32.0)	8.0 (46.4)	−2.8 (27.0)
Average precipitation mm (inches)	6.9 (0.27)	9.0 (0.35)	12.6 (0.50)	23. (0.9)	32.3 (1.27)	46.5 (1.83)	39.2 (1.54)	37.4 (1.47)	24.8 (0.98)	20.5 (0.81)	12.2 (0.48)	8.6 (0.34)	273 (10.74)
Average precipitation days (≥ 0.25 mm)	0.9	1.2	2.0	3.4	4.8	5.7	5.4	5.4	3.7	2.9	2.0	1.4	38.8
Source: Starlings Roost Weather (precipitation 1880–2023)

== Economy ==
George Parker owned a shop and managed the first Post Office on the south side of town, from 1824 to 1860. His salary as Post Master was about 24 ZAR per year, and as Shopkeeper, by ordinance, he had to supply twelve months worth of credit to clients. The town of Worcester was founded as an administrative seat and to create a church and central market place for the frontier farmers. With the market established, Scottish artisans settled in the town, bringing their skills as tinsmiths, coppersmiths, blacksmiths, shoemakers etc. By the mid-1830s the Colonial interior was starting to open up and Worcester as frontier town would gain by this. The first economic boon would come in the form of livestock trading and fresh produce farming followed by the development of a wagon industry. Due to the fact that Worcester was the last town before the Karoo interior, hotels and shops started to spring up to replenish travellers. With a solid foundation for economic development laid by 1845 and the road across the Bainskloof pass completed in 1852, bringing quicker access to Cape Town, it was time for Worcester to move forward.

The Worcester Commercial Bank Unlimited was officially established in 1856. Due to growth in the wagon making industry, the Bank ran into a credit crisis by 1864. Discounting of bills of exchange became difficult and investors started to withdraw their money. Only a £6000 capital injection by the board of directors saved the Bank from ruin. The discovery of diamonds brought a steadier stream of prospectors travelling through Worcester. This led to the opening of more shops and lodgings and other facilities to meet their needs and a rise in the town's population.

These factors led to the early construction of a diverse and cosmopolitan society in Worcester, outside of Cape Town, the only town that would develop as such in the Western Province during the late 19th century. In 1890 the African Banking Corporation was established in London, all branches were overseas. The Bank was formed as a consortium bank owned jointly by Lloyds Bank, National Provincial, Westminster and Standard Bank of South Africa. In December 1891, Articles of Agreement were drawn up with the Worcester Bank and operations were handed over to African Banking Corporation in February 1892.

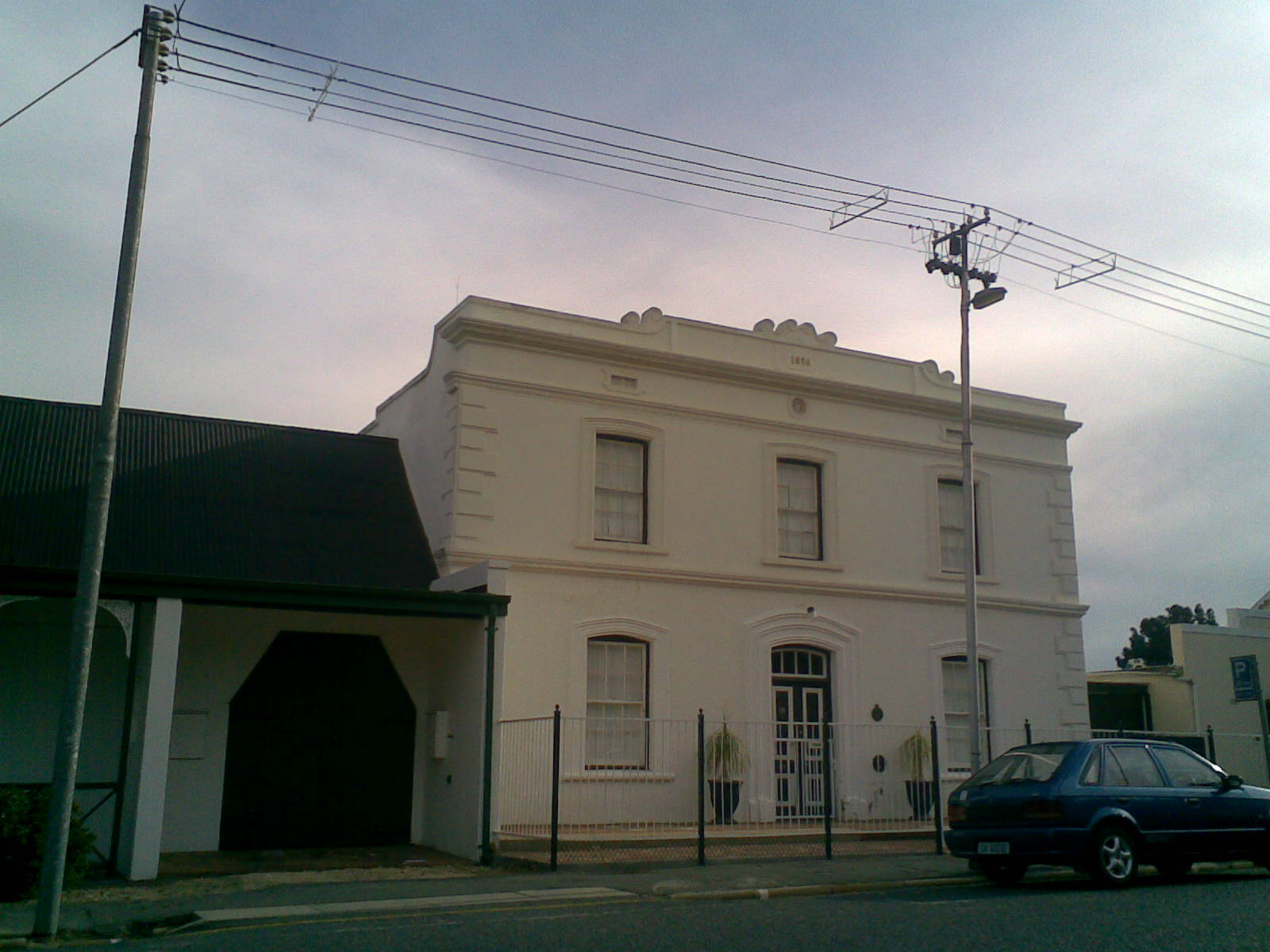
Stockenström Street Sub Division House 1870

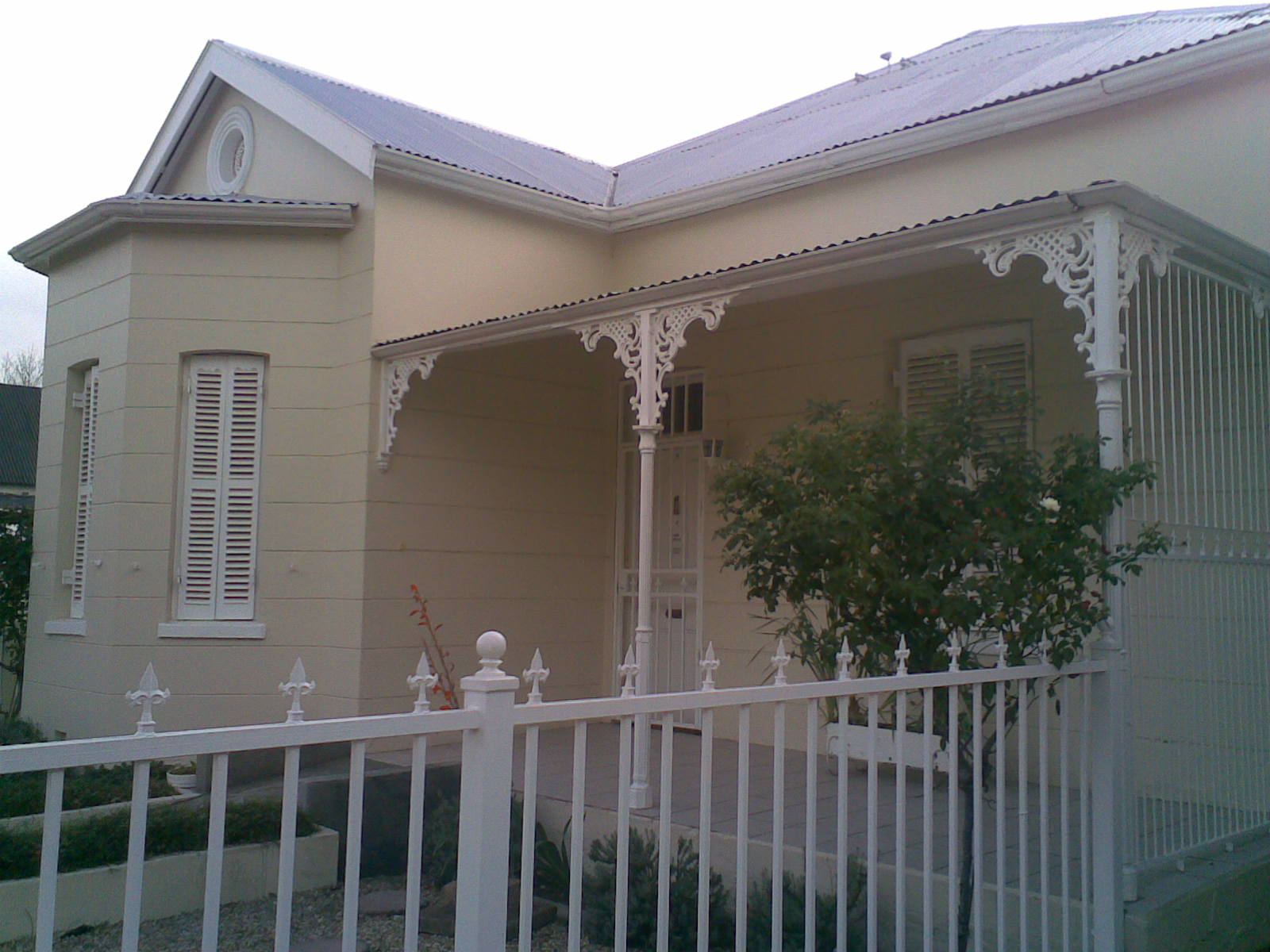
Russell Street Sub Division House 1890

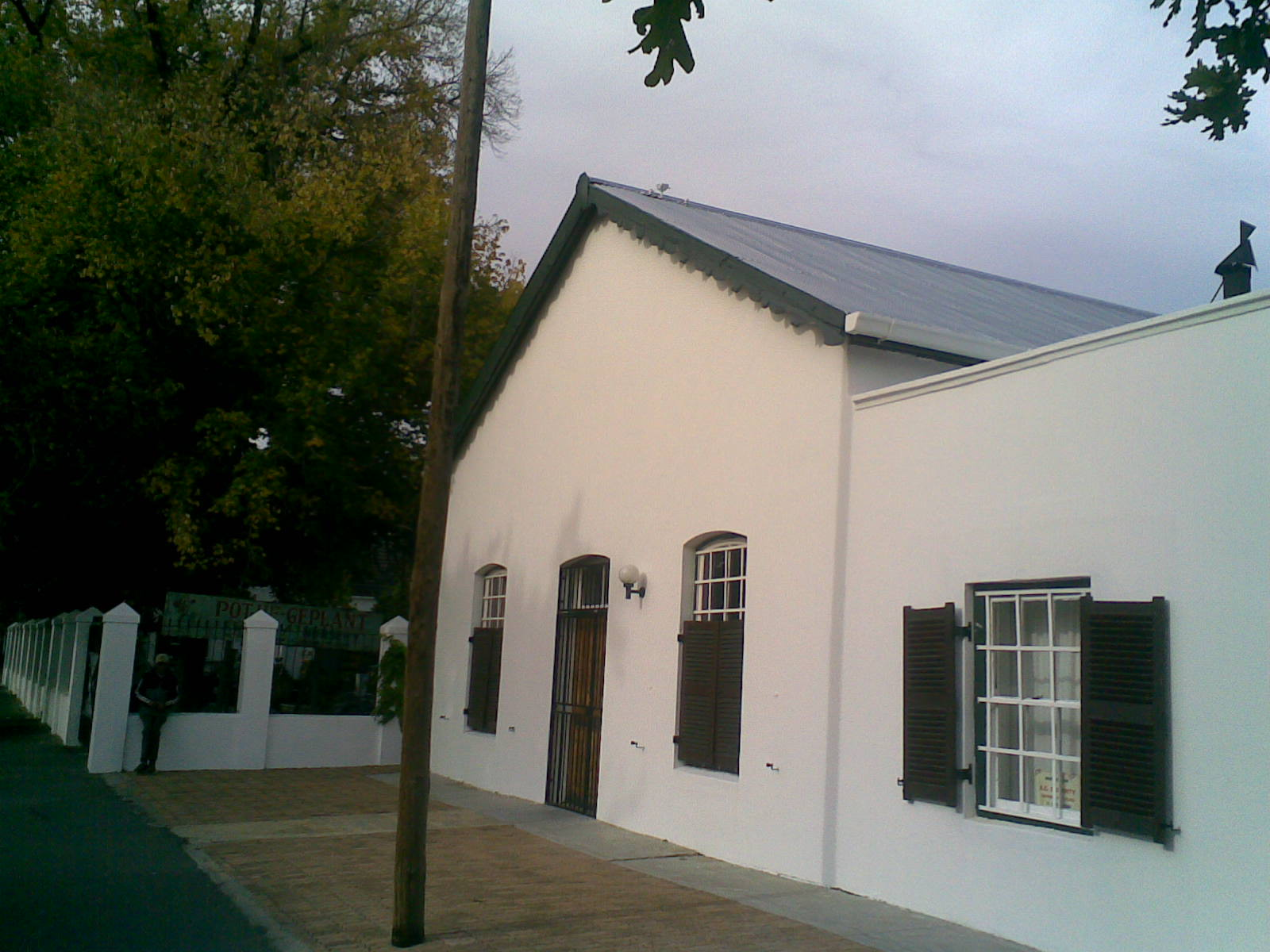
Russell Street Sub Division House 1895

Finance would bring the Industrial Revolution to Worcester and economic growth really started once the railway line reached the town in 1876. The previous decade saw German artisans arriving from Pomerania, employed by farmers. These German labourers would bring their skills as expert farmers and would play a major role in the development of the farming industry.

A second group of German settlers followed in the 1870s to help with railway line construction. They again would bring skills as highly trained artisans. By the 1880s a Jewish community of traders and capital-rich business people would follow. The early 1900s saw the first Greek residents and business people. Belgian, French, Italian and Portuguese communities all settled in Worcester at the end of World War II.

By 1882 the Cape Colonial Government proclaimed that the railway line should be extended to Robertson. The New Cape Central Railway Company (NCCR) undertook the construction of this line and it was completed in September 1887. Newspapers of the era informed the public of 3 up and 3 down trains on a daily basis. In addition to the new line, railway sidings were established throughout the district. From Cape Town at Breërivier, Botha's Halt, Goudini Road and Chavonnes. To Kimberley at De Wet, Sandhills and Orchard. On the NCCR line at Overhex and Nuy. In 1883 the Reverend William Murray and the Church Council petitioned the Cape Colonial Government against the use of trains on Sundays.

By the 1880s 40 companies manufactured wagons in Worcester, Fairbairn- Durban- and Riebeeck Streets housed these factories. The Worcester Industry slowly died as the railway lines became a more effective mode of transportation.

The Western Wine and Brandy Company founded in 1895 built the first distillery in Porter Street. By 1918 the KWV was founded and took control of the distillery.

JS Naudè & Co controlled the buying and distribution of deciduous fruit from 1899 onwards. The company developed internal, African and in later years European markets. By 1960 all the companies in Worcester amalgamated to form Deciduous Fruit Distributors of Worcester.

The Prune Growers Association was founded in 1890; by 1907 this organisation was changed to a company, which would become Safari SAD. The first branch opened in Porter Street in 1921.

The Union Vinegar Company was established in 1913. It was the first South African factory to produce Beetroot salad. Other products included vinegar, pickled onions, piccalilli, tomato sauce and Worcester sauce.

Simon and Woolf Heller were merchants in dried fruit. In 1930 they established a Jam Factory. With the outbreak of the Second World War the Standard Fruit Company received an order for 170 000 cases of jam. The company was transformed into a public company, Standard Canners and Packers. In 1954 Langeberg Food Processors Ltd bought the controlling stock.

In 1952 Eskom's Hex River Power Station came into production. It was built primarily for railway electrification and additional supply of electricity for rural areas. The Power Station was demolished in 1990.

The main incentive in 1949 for the establishment of Hex River Textiles Mills Ltd was the plentiful supply of labour, as well as the suitability of the Hex River's water for the purpose. Operating at its peak during the 1960s, the factory employed 1200 workers.

The multi-national company, Rainbow Chicken Ltd invested substantial capital in farms and a factory in Worcester during the 1970s. Today some light industries such as millers, coldddrink manufacturers, food manufacturers, furniture manufacturers, paint manufacturers, joineries and engineering works are located in the town.

=== Water and sewerage ===
Worcester originally drew its water from the Hex River. The early water distribution method was very primitive. The water ran in over Joubert's Mill and then flowed in open channels through the town. The first reservoir and distribution pipes were built in 1875. In 1910 a diversion and storage dam had been constructed in Fairy Glen, followed by the completion of a filtration and chlorination plant in 1936. By 1945 Worcester started planning to build a proper water impounding scheme. Construction of the Stettynskloof Dam started in 1952. The work was undertaken by Beton und Monierbau Aktiengesellschaft of Düsseldorf, Germany. Dr. Heinz Schulze was the head engineer and work was completed in 1955.

After completion of the town's sewerage scheme in 1934 considerable development took place in the Worcester Municipal area. The sewerage purification works was completed in 1962, with an estimated life span of 30 years.

=== Transport & communication ===
In 1846 construction on the Bainskloof Pass started, Andrew Geddes Bain was the head engineer and the road was completed in 1852. By November 1863, only 60 kilometres of railway line (from Cape Town to Wellington) was in operation in the whole of the early South African colony. However, the discovery of diamonds in Kimberley, and the attainment of Responsible Government for the Cape Colony in 1872, prompted the Cape Prime Minister John Molteno to start expansion of the railway- and telegraph lines to Kimberley. The Cape Government Railways were immediately formed for this purpose. Thomas Brounger was appointed as the head railway engineer, and with the help of Thomas Bain, the line to Worcester was opened on 16 June 1876. On the opening of the station at Worcester, the Cape Argus reported as follows:

"Worcester, on June 16, 1876, was the scene of elaborate ceremony and of a very large and distinguished assemblage to witness the railway opening by Sir Henry Barkly. After the address had been presented to the Governor and His Excellency's reply, there were short speeches by Sir Arthur Cunningham, Commander of the Forces, and Sir John Molteno, the Cape Prime Minister, and an adjournment made to the grand luncheon or banquet. In the evening there was a ball, at which most people enjoyed themselves, undeterred by the failure of the lighting and refreshments arrangement."

During 1875 the farm De Doorns in the Hex River Valley was bought by the Cape Colonial Government to build a railway station. Around this station the hamlet of De Doorns would develop. By 1877, the line already reached Montagu Road on its way to Kimberley and in 1883 the name was changed to Touws River. Construction of an additional main railway line during 1931 would lead to the establishment of Matroosberg station.

=== Electricity ===
On 25 June 1916 the first supply of electricity to Worcester was provided by 2 x 40 kW 220 volt direct current water turbine generators. Growth was slow but steady and by 1921 Worcester had its own Power Station Building. By 1933 overloading at peak periods necessitated increased capacity. Eskom provided a single standby line. By 1948 Eskom started construction on the Hex River Power Station. The power station came into production in 1952 and the municipal main sub-station was connected to Eskom, all supply was then taken from this source.

== Demographics ==
=== Religion ===
During the early years, religion played a comprehensive part in the development of Worcester as a town. Though the new town was still underdeveloped, by 1821, the Dutch Reformed Church congregation was already established in Worcester. The Reverend Henry Sutherland, a Scotsman, served the congregation from 1824 to 1859.

After the abolition of slavery in 1834, the so-called "Coloured quarter" of town started to populate, south of Durban Street, between Rainer- and Grey Streets. This community was mainly composed of free slaves and 24 plots were set aside for development in 1840. For the next 110 years, the Rhenish Missionary Society would play an important part in the development of this community. Worcester's first Mission Church was established in 1832. The Rhenish Mission complex situated on the corner of High- and Adderley streets forms an integral part of the rich Worcester cultural and architectural heritage. The coloured community-owned farms, Hendrik Gertse at Hex River, Andreas Jasons at Brandwacht, Jeftha Fransman at Goudini while the Afrika, Hartzenberg, Everts, Solomons, Romans and Titus families were employed as labourers.

The Anglican church in Worcester,Church of St James the Great, Worcester (Note: The Anglican church, St James the Great is located at 33°38′45″S 19°26′42″E) was founded on 28 January 1859. The church was designed by Sophy Gray and its foundation stone was laid 15 December 1852. The first rector was the Reverend John Melville-Martine M.A., who previously had been vicar of Shipley, Sussex. Melville-Martine also ministered at Brigus in Canada.(Hollett 2016, p. 79)

The Malay community was known as bricklayers, vat coopers and tailors in Worcester and dates back to the era of free slaves in the 1830s. Application to construct a mosque was first filed in 1867. Permission was granted in 1880 and by 1881 the Muslim community started to use the premises at Durban Street.

The first Germans settled in Worcester during the 1860s as skilled farm labourers. During the 1870s a second wave of German artisans helped with the construction of the railway line and in return received Crown property at Goudini Road in 1880. A Lutheran congregation was established and the church building was completed in November 1883.

The first Congregational church was built at 54 Porter Street in 1894. The site had disadvantages, in particular" the aroma from the vinegar factory next door." In 1948 the property was sold and the present fine church was erected in Church Street.

In 1848, Dr Diederich Heinrich Fraenkel found his way to Worcester to become District Surgeon, his father, Dr Siegfried Fraenkel, was the first conforming Jew to reside at the Cape. Educated at SACS, Dr Fraenkel was the first Jewish resident at Worcester. Jewish traders began to settle in Worcester during the 1880s, a plot of ground was purchased in 1902 from the Municipality to establish a Jewish cemetery. The first Hebrew congregation was founded in 1903 and in 1904 the synagogue was consecrated in Durban Street.

The work of the Salvation Army in Worcester began in 1891, when Captain Lotz "opened fire" and became the first Commanding Officer in charge. Brother Craayenstein, born in 1868, kept the work of the Corps going visibly. A faithful soldier to the Army for many decades, he was a familiar figure in Worcester, attending the Saturday night Open-Air meetings with his violin, which he also took to the goal every Sunday morning for service. After the Saturday night meetings he was welcomed into the public bars, whose customers put money liberally into the box he carried for the Army. In January 1961 Worcester's oldest and most faithful soldier of the Salvation Army was promoted to Glory – the Army's term for dying.

During the 1920s the Methodist Church started with missionary work under the Xhosa community and by 1937 the Dutch Reformed Church followed in the Basotho community. By 1938 the missionary societies rented a hall where church and school could be attended.

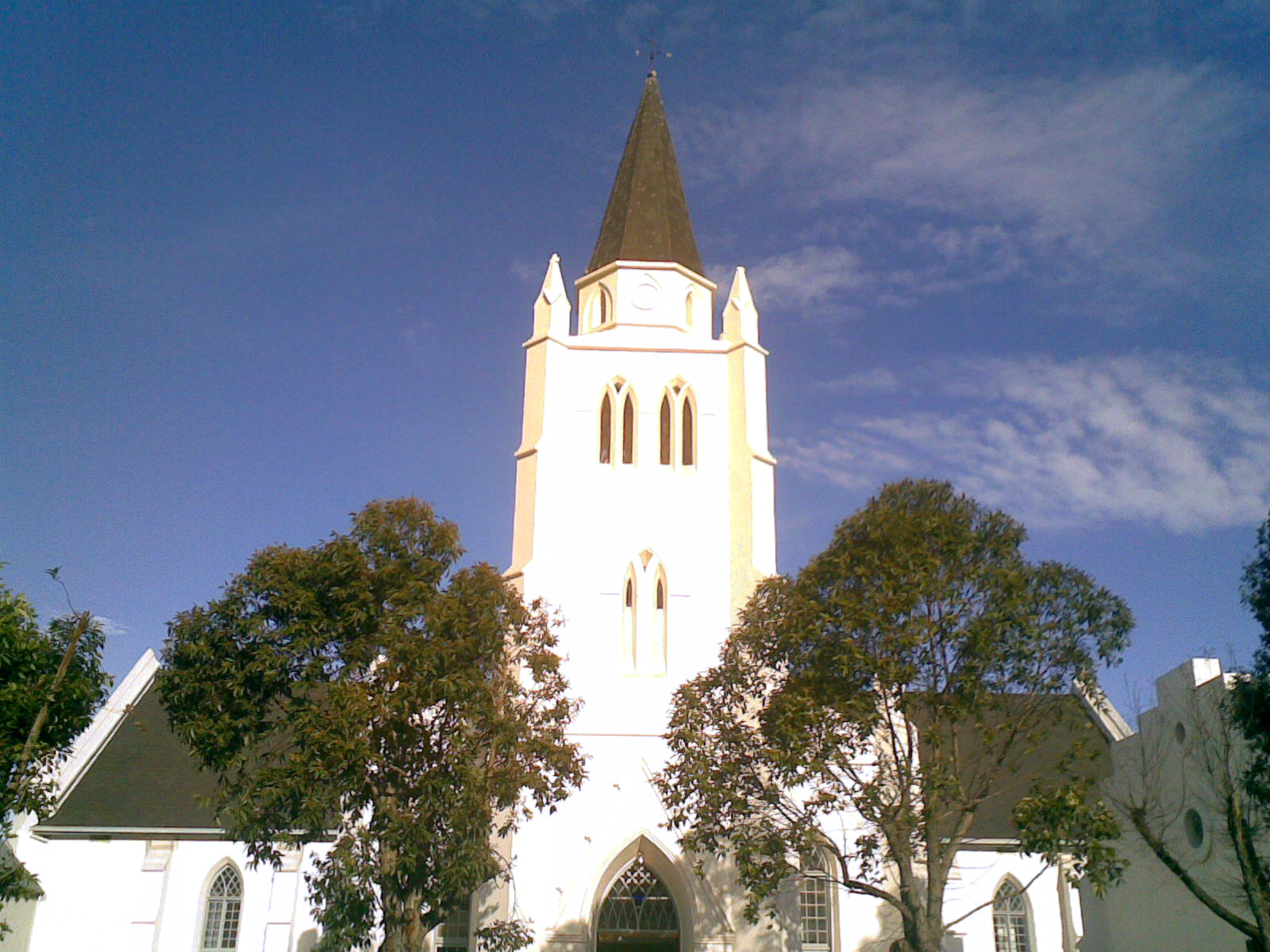
Rhenish Mission Church Adderley Street

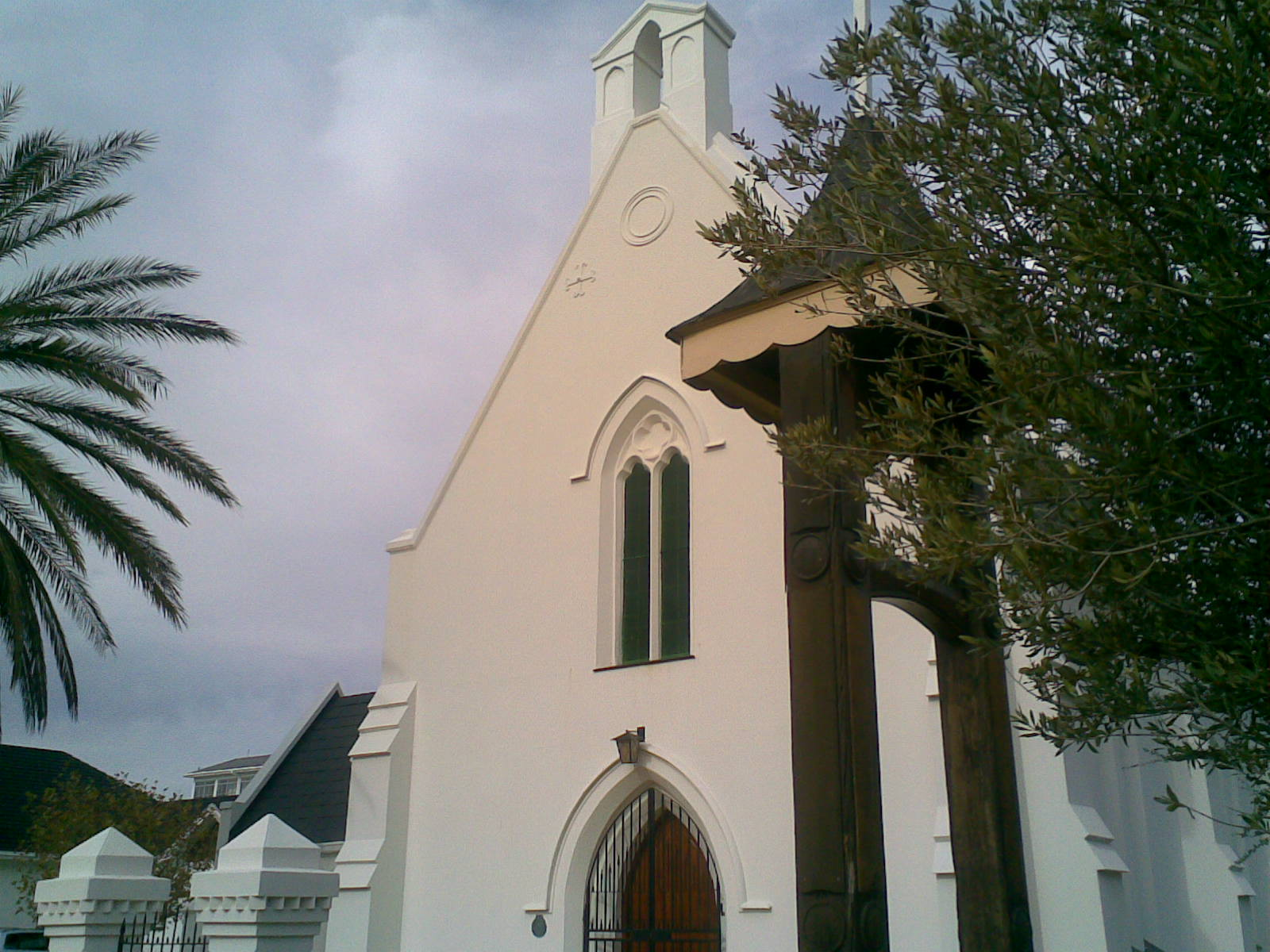
Anglican Church on Market Square

Lutheran Church Adderley Street

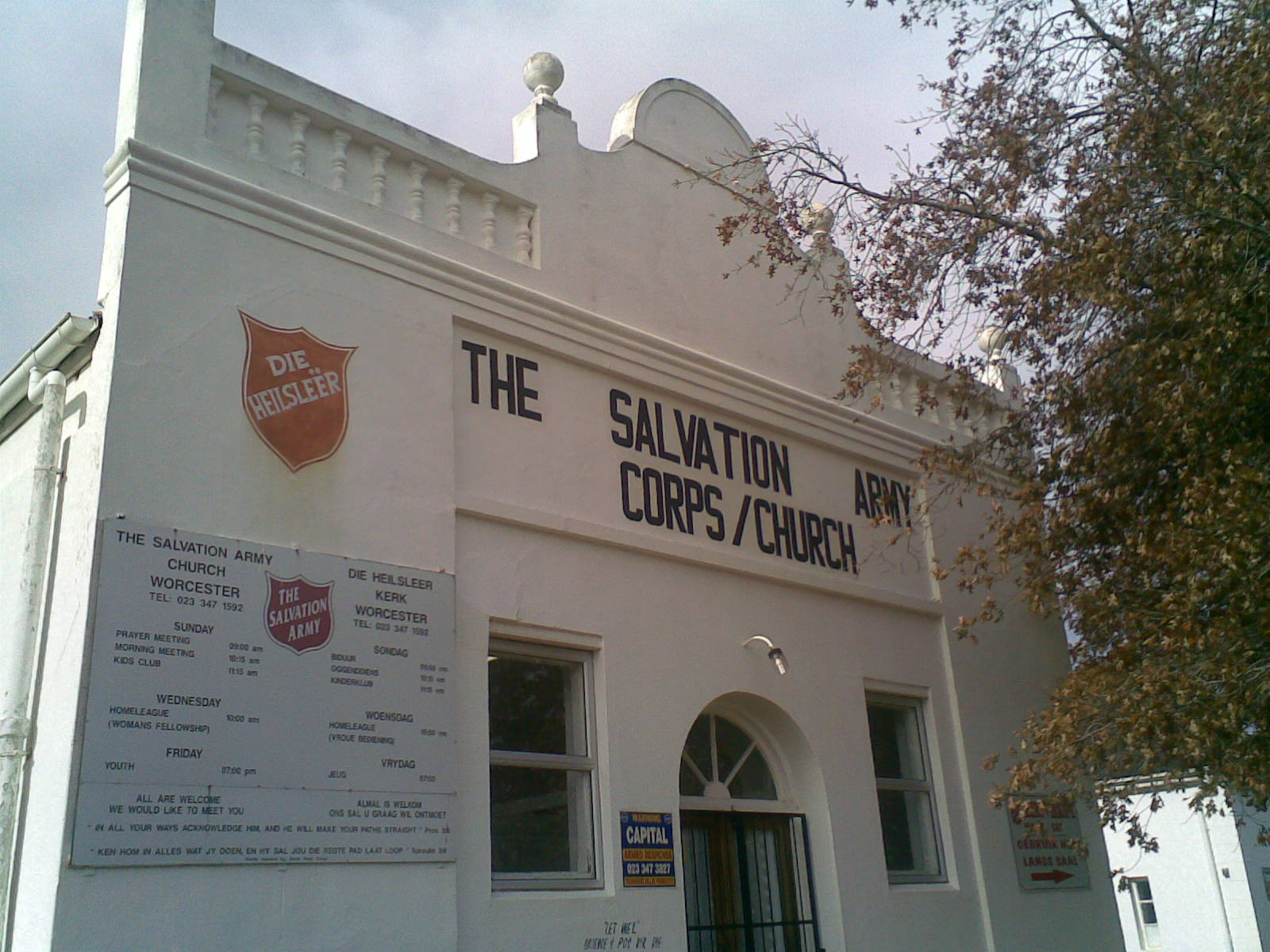
Salvation Army Porter Street

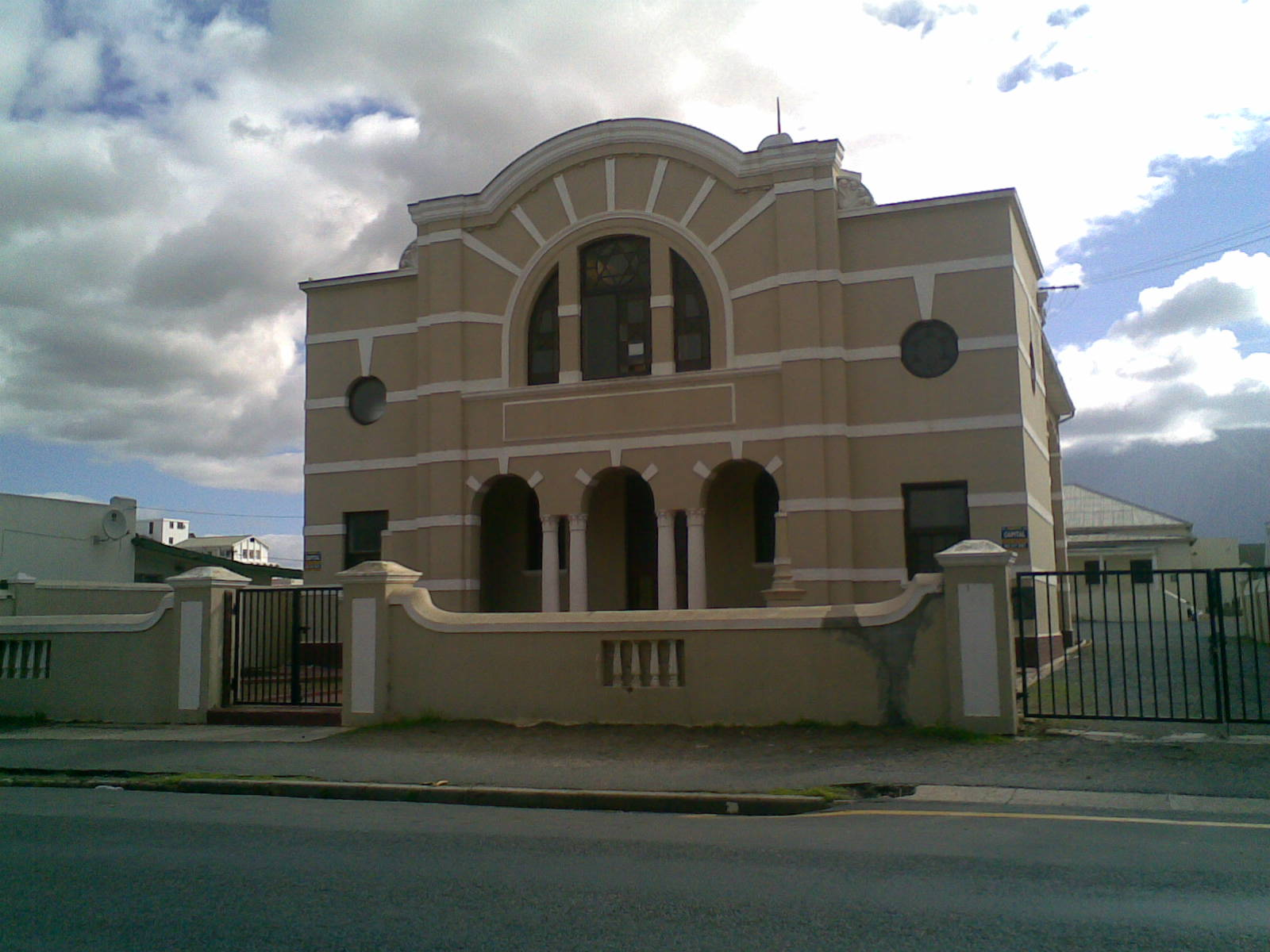
Old Synagogue Durban Street

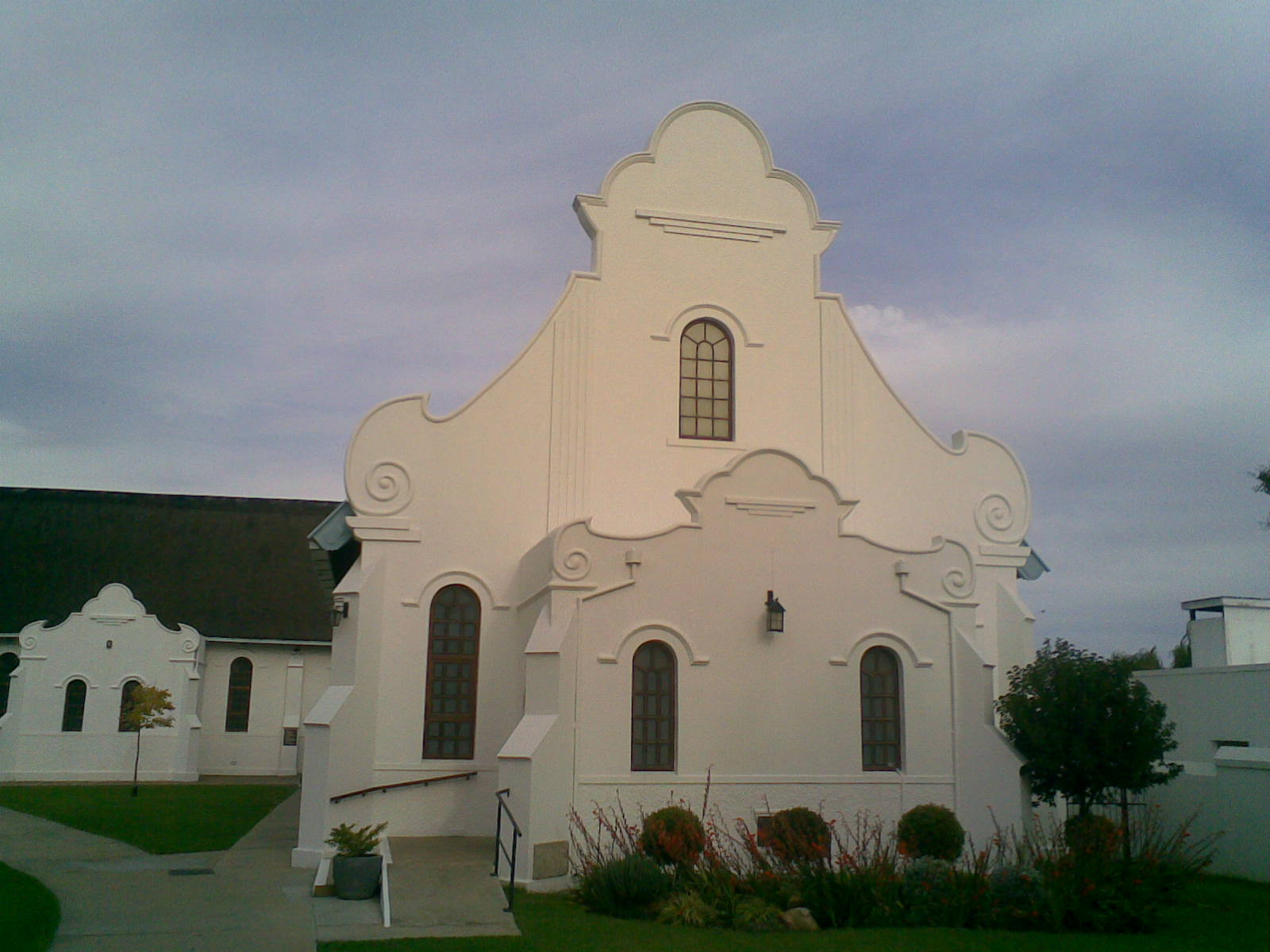
Congregational Church Church Street

=== Residential Areas ===
Area
Old Town	Parkersdam	Paglande	Langerug	Hospital Park
Reunion Park	Hospital Hill	Fairy Glen	Roodewal	Riverview
Esselen Park	Zweletemba	Worcester West	Roux Park	Van Riebeeck Park
Victoria Park	Noble Park	Meirings Park	Panorama	Hexpark
Johnsons Park	Somerset Park	Mandela Square	Fairway Heights	Rolihlahla Informal
Avian Park	Worcester Industrial	Florian Park		

== Culture ==
=== Education ===
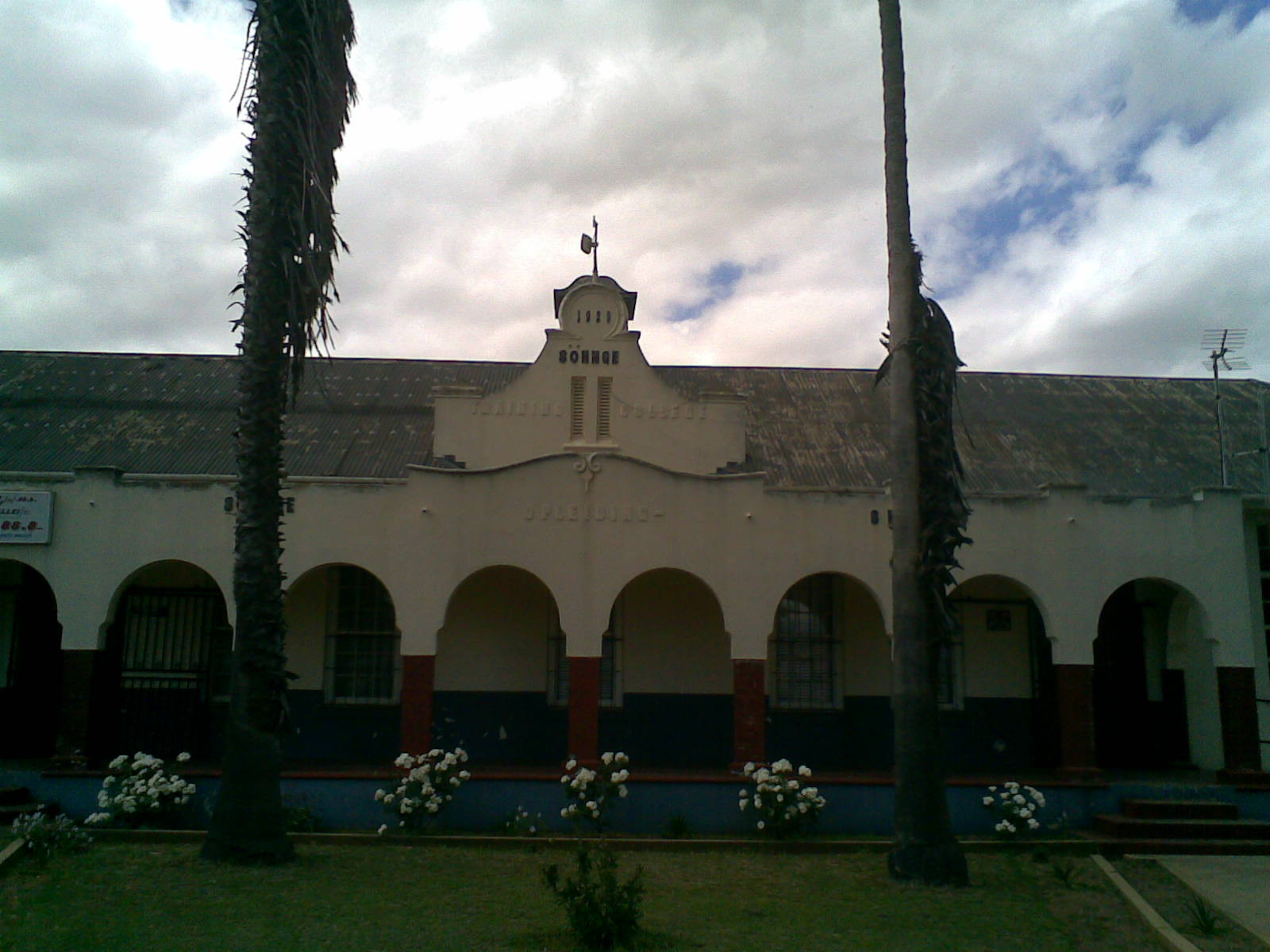
Old Söhgne College

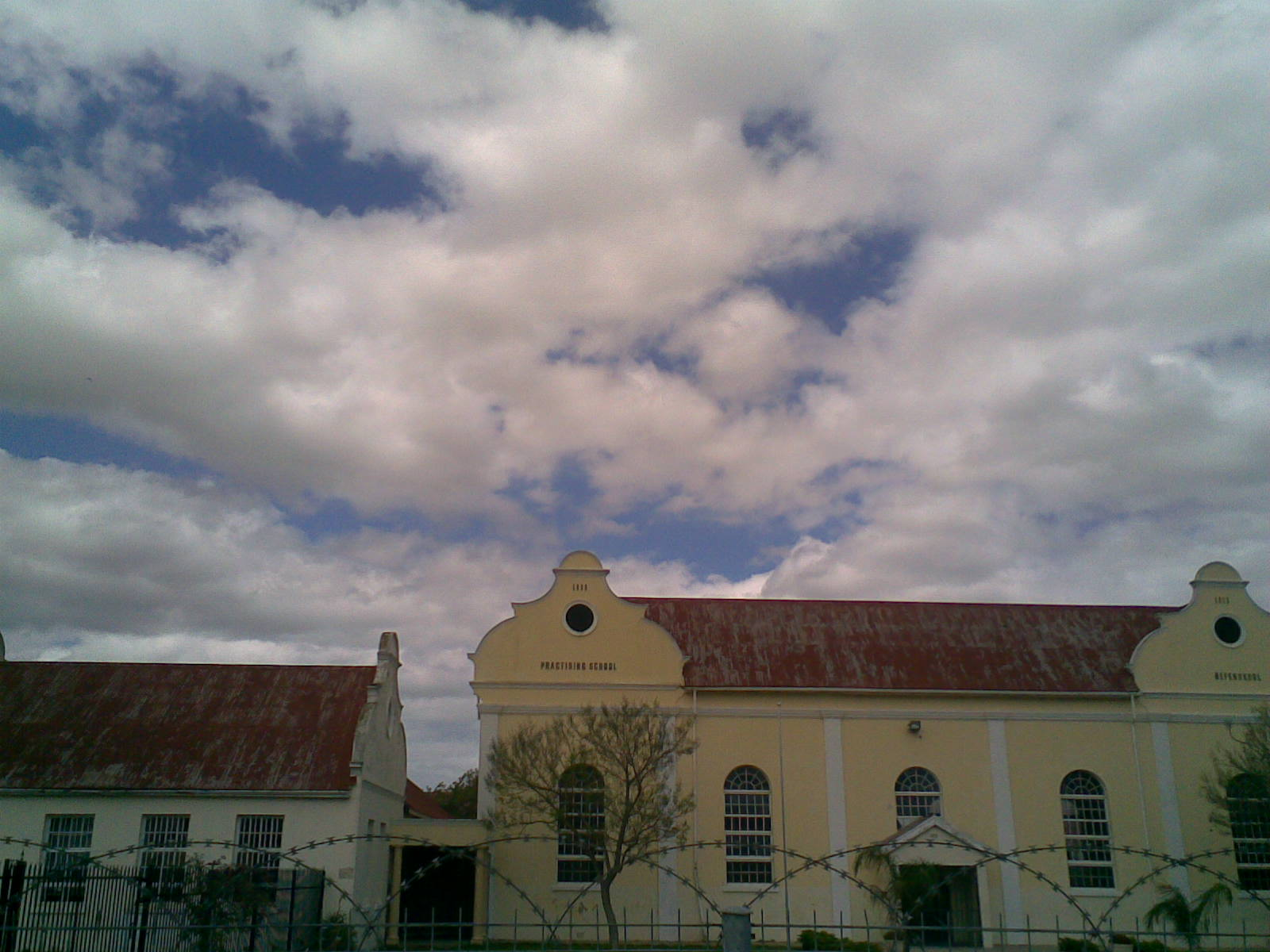
Practising School

Schooling started in Worcester with Worcester Boys High's origin dating back to 1824. Magistrate Truter, District Surgeon Glaeser and Reverend Sutherland served on the School Commission when the Government Free School reached the town in 1830. School was attended six days a week and subjects included Dictatation, Reading, Grammar, Writing, Arithmetic and Translating from Dutch into English. School started at 8 am, finished at 4 pm with a two-hour break at 11 am.

The official formation of the school took place on 2 July 1873 when the "Undenominational Boys Public school" was declared. By June 1882 the school was classified as a Class 1 Public School and by 1899 a high school. It later became Worcester Boys' High. In 1972 Worcester Boys' High and Worcester Girls High amalgamated and formed Worcester High School. Another result of the amalgamation in 1972 was Hoerskool Montana . Worcester High School operated for 20 years before amalgamating once more in 1992, with Worcester East High School. This joining formed Worcester Gymnasium, which opened in January 1992, on the grounds of the former school. Parts of the Boys' Highs' building are still used.

The Ladies Seminary was founded by the Dutch Reformed Church in January 1876 after a period of 3 years when no education was offered to girls in Worcester. By 1908 it became a Girls High School.

Schools for Deaf and Blind people were founded in 1881 by the Dutch Reformed Church. Two world-renowned schools developed out of humble beginnings. From the 1880s to 1899 the Lutheran and Anglican Churches operated their own schools in town. Coloured children were allowed to attend the Lutheran School to receive a higher education.

Worcester Practising School (Oefen Skool) was established in 1938 as one of the primary schools for coloured children.

During the Second Boer War, Prisoners of War were sent to St Helena, Ceylon etc. Many of the young boys never received or completed an education. The Dutch Reformed Church founded a school in what became the birth of adult education. Students were taught in the Gospel but also learned trades. The Drostdy was handed over by Government for this purpose in 1903 and by 1911 it had developed into an Industrial School. Since 1944 it is known as the Drostdy Technical High School.

A Muslim school has been in operation in Worcester since the 1840s. In 1835 a Mission School where elementary education was offered was started by the Rhenish Missionary Society. By the end of the first World War the Venerable Söhnge came to Worcester with instructions from the Society to develop a Teachers Training College for Coloured people. The Dutch Reformed Mission Church, who had by then taken over the duties of the Rhenish Society, started a school for Coloured deaf children in 1933. Ironically it was under the Apartheid system that schools were first built for the Coloured and Black African communities. During the Apartheid years, education was only offered on an elementary level in the Zweletemba township.

Montana is High School in the northern part of the town, founded in 1972, as another product of the amalgamation of Girls High and Boys High.

In 1997 an English-medium independent school was founded. Known as Lanner House after the indigenous Lanner falcon, the school provides education for children from preschool to Grade 9. Despite the fact that the language of instruction is English, an increasing number of Afrikaans families are enrolling their children in the school.

In 2014 the Stellenbosch University Ukwanda campus was opened officially. This campus is utilized by the Faculty of Medicine and Health Sciences of Stellenbosch University to train final year students of the occupational therapy, physiotherapy, human nutrition, speech and language therapy and medical programs.

In August 2015, construction on a new high school, Somerset High, began and was completed in December 2016. The school began its first academic year in 2017.

=== Media ===
The first edition of the Worcester Weekly News was printed on 31 July 1880. The proprietor was Mr Watson and issues published under this masthead until 17 August 1882. J.E. de Jong was a master-printer from Deventer, Overijssel, Netherlands. He settled in Cape Town in 1875 and worked for The Cape Argus Printing and Publishing Company. By 1882 he had moved to Worcester and bought the Worcester Weekly News. From August 1882 he changed the name to the Worcester Advertiser, politically supported the Afrikanerbond and would criticise the Second Boer War in later years.

By 1894 the town was experiencing solid population growth and the then Cape Colony Premier, Cecil John Rhodes realised that to gain influence with the public he needed the local newspaper to support his policies. De Jong was offered £5000 for his newspaper and a salary of £500 per annum. De Jong refused the offer and Rhodes decided to start his own newspaper, The Worcester Standard. These two papers ran in opposition until 1927, when they amalgamated to form the Worcester Standard and Advertiser. During the Anglo-Boer War, De Jong was jailed at Tokai. In 2023 the Worcester Standard amalgamated with the Breederivier Gazette and began to be distributed as a free newspaper.

The paper remained in private proprietary until 1980, when it was sold to Naspers. The paper publishes to this day, making it one of the oldest local newspapers in South Africa. In 2023 the Worcester Standard amalgamated with the Breederivier Gazette and began distribution as a free newspaper.

=== Sport ===
==== Tennis and cricket ====
Lawn Tennis was played at the Standard Courts from 1877 and by 1906, two clubs played competitive tennis in Worcester. On 3 January 1877, a Worcester Cricket team played for the first time against a Cape Town side. Matches took place at Church-, Market and Queen Squares. Players were organised into three local teams, Rangers, Worcester and United and played their matches on Saturdays.

In 1905 the MCC under Pelham Plum Warner played a match against a combined Worcester side. From 1908 matches were played in league format and competition for the Perkins Cup started. From 1916 to 1925 Richard Robins (Dick) Luyt played for the Worcester Club as well as representing Western Province in the Currie Cup Competition. On 20 and 21 January 1925, Luyt captained a Western Province Country Districts side at Worcester when they played against the Solomon Joel XI. During the 1950s Luyt would become a Springbok cricket selector. Between 1921 and 1922, the Springbok cricketer Jimmy Blanckenberg played for Worcester and on 2 August 1931; Eddie Fuller was born in Worcester.

Boland Park would have to wait until the 1990s to see provincial cricket again. By this time Claude Henderson, born and educated at Worcester was the new cricketing star. Peter Kirsten, Gary Kirsten, Tim Shaw, Rudi Bryson, Phillip Amm, Kepler Wessels, Adrian Kuiper, Terence Lazard and John Commins would all score centuries at Boland Park. During April 1993, Glamorgan played against Warwickshire in an over limited match at Boland Park. Henderson would go on to represent South Africa in 7 test matches and 4 ODI's.

==== Rugby Union ====
Barry Fairy Heatlie was born at Glen Heatlie in the district of Worcester, on 25 April 1872, one of nine brothers who were all good athletes and sportsmen. He was selected for Western Province at the age of 18, and for South Africa in his 20th year. Altogether he represented Western Province in 41 matches and he was never on the losing side in 26 Currie Cup matches. Heatlie was a big, robust forward and an intelligent, inspiring leader. When Heatlie was given the captaincy of the South Africans for the final test in 1896, he decided to supply his team with jerseys from the Old Diocesan Club. It was a happy coincidence that the jerseys were green and that South Africa, therefore, won her first international wearing what was to become the national colour. South Africa won the test 5 – 0 and afterwards Heatlie was carried around the field in triumph. Barry Heatlie and his 14 heroes had to rely on public transport to get home after their historic triumph.

In 1882 a Worcester Rugby team played in the first recorded match against De Doorns, "A special train was engaged and a tremendous crowd of enthusiasts proceeded to the Valley for a whole day's picnicking and some football." The Church Council complained about this "tendency of the age," matches played on Saturday afternoon interfered with the Preparation Service for Sunday Sermon. The Rugby Club was founded by Jimmy de Jongh, a local lawyer and started competition in the Western Province Country League in 1884. For the first league match played against Malmesbury, the team left Worcester on the Thursday to only return on Monday. Malmesbury declared match day as a Public Holiday. Charles Heatlie represented the Cape Colony against the first British side in 1891 and under his captaincy, Worcester won the Country Cup from 1889 to 1894. The club again won the Cup in 1897 when Noble Heatlie was captain.

In 1883 Villagers Worcester was established and trophies show that by 1893 they even have their own union. They are one of the oldest clubs from the formerly disadvantage communities that played and survived two world wars. Others break up and re-establish decades later and claim back their first establish date. Six players of the club had the honour of wearing the green and gold of SARU. Johnny Neethling, Isak Neethling, Abe Felix, Maurice Hankey, Christy Noble and Charles January. Villagers Worcester won the premier division of the Boland Union in 2012 and represent the union in the first Community Cup Competition of 2013.

Percy Allport was educated at Worcester and became a Springbok when he represented South Africa in 1910. Allport played at fullback in the last two tests of the series against the fourth English touring side. With the series poised at one win each, the third test at Newlands created more public interest than any other rugby match up to then and for the first time reports in the old newspapers refer to the "perpetual Newlands roar." The highlight of the match was undoubtedly a try scored by Allport. It was to be 45 years before Roy Dryburgh became only the second Springbok fullback in history to score a try in a test.

Richard Robins (Dick) Luyt was born at Ceres and was ranked by his contemporaries as a centre as good as Japie Krige. He had the same uncanny ability to create openings for his teammates and it would seem as if he was South Africa's first hard-tackling centre. Dick Luyt who was a medical doctor settled in Worcester during 1916 and played and captained the Worcester club until 1922.

In 1931, Schalk du Toit and Alvi van der Merwe were selected to tour with Bennie Osler's Springbok side to the United Kingdom with Van der Merwe playing in the test against Wales. His son Johan became Boland captain and later played for Villagers Worcester. Buks Marais who was educated at Worcester became a Springbok in 1949 when he played in two tests against the All Blacks. He toured with the Springboks to Europe in 1951/52 and played in the test against Scotland. In 1953 he returned to Worcester and again played in the first two tests against the Wallabies. In 1952 the Boland Provincial side played in the Currie Cup final against Transvaal. Steve Hoffman, Johan Naude and Albertus van der Merwe played for the Boland team. Hoffman would become a Springbok in 1953 and Van der Merwe would represent the Springboks in 12 tests from 1955 to 1960.

In 1969 Mike Jennings was selected to tour with the Springboks to Britain. The tour would become infamous as the "Demo tour." Johan Oosthuizen, born and educated at Worcester, would represent the Springboks in 9 tests from 1974 to 1976. During 1996 the All Blacks played a rugby match on their South African tour, against the Boland Provincial side at Esselen Park.

==== Golf and other sports ====
The early golfers wore red blazers and long white trousers and played on Church Square during the 1880s. The first Golf Club in Southern Africa was the Royal Cape Golf Club founded in 1885. The Worcester Golf Club was established in 1896 and competition for the Donnison Cup between these two clubs started in 1905.

By 1892 Izak Meiring, Hennie de Wet and Jas Perkins founded the Mountain Club, the first of its kind in South Africa. Meiring who was a pharmacist and amateur surveyor, confirmed Matroosberg as the highest peak in the Western Province. Meiring's Plateau on the Brandwacht Mountains was named for him. The Worcester Athletic and Cycling Club was founded in 1905, the Swimming Club in 1906 and the Piscatorial Club in 1907.

The Cape Gliding Club has been based at the Worcester airfield since 1988.

==== Notable sporting performances ====
- Dicky Broberg – during 1971 he set a new South African record in the 800m track event when he ran a time of 1 min 44.70 sec. His time was only .40-second slower than the world record and would be ranked as the fastest time in the world during 1971. As a South African record it would only be broken during 1996.
- Stefan Hugo – won the Berg River Canoe Marathon in 1976, 1977, 1980, 1982 and 1984.
- JJ Provoyeur – in 1994/95 he single-handed circumnavigated the globe during the BOC Challenge. He completed the race in 133 days.

== Notable residents ==
- C. Louis Leipoldt – South African poet in Afrikaans, writer in English, Afrikaans and Dutch, born in Worcester 1882
- Jean Welz – Austrian born architect and artist, lived in Worcester from 1943 to 1969
- J. M. Coetzee – Nobel Prize winner for literature, lived as a boy in Worcester
- Stefanus Gie – diplomat
- John-Roy Jenkinson – rugby union player
- David Kramer – Singer, songwriter, playwright and director
- Diana Ferrus – South African poet and story writer in Afrikaans
- Tamaryn Green – Miss South Africa 2018 and first runner-up at Miss Universe 2018
- Deetlefs du Toit – former South African politician now living in New Jersey, United States
- Lundi Tyamara – Famous South African Gospel Singer
- Pieter Hugo Naudé - Famous South African painter
- Dumile Feni - artist
- Bibi Dawood - activist

== Coats of arms ==
Worcester Divisional Council coat of arms (1973)

Municipality (1) — By 1931, the town council had assumed a coat of arms consisting of a blue shield depicting a golden portcullis on a silver and red torse. (Note: The arms were shown on a cigarette card issued in 1931.) The portcullis is the crest of the arms of the Somerset family.

Municipality (2) — On 27 September 1948, the council approved a new design, by Ivan Mitford-Barberton and H. Ellis Tomlinson. This was in response to a Cape Provincial Administration circular calling on municipalities to have their arms checked and, if necessary, re-designed to make them heraldically correct. The arms were registered with the provincial administration in May 1957 and at the Bureau of Heraldry in February 1983.

The arms were: Quarterly, Sable and Gules, a portcullis Or, nailed Azure; on a chief wavy Argent, three hurts, on each a fleur-de-lis, Or (in layman's terms: a shield quartered in black and red, displaying a golden portcullis with blue nails, above this is a horizontal silver strip with a wavy edge, displaying three golden fleurs de lis on blue discs). The crest was a golden demi-lion holding a cornucopia of fruit. The motto was Mutare sperno. The black and red quartered shield was derived from the arms of the English city of Worcester.

Divisional council (1) — By 1959, the divisional council (the local authority for the rural areas outside the town) had taken over the old discarded municipal arms.

Divisional council (2) — The divisional council had a new coat of arms designed by Cornelis Pama in 1973. It was registered at the Bureau on 29 November 1974.

The arms were: Vert, a bend dancetty Argent in the shape of a letter W between two bezants (i.e. a green shield displaying a silver W-shaped stripe between two golden discs). The crest was two bunches of grapes on either side of a stick, and the motto was Fructu noscitur. These arms were re-registered by the council's successor, the Divisional Council of Matroosberg, in April 1980. The latter also had a flag consisting of a banner of the arms.

== Incidents ==
On 24 December 1996, Stefaans Coetzee and associates carried out the 1996 Shoprite bombing where a bomb was planted in a Christmas tree decoration in a Shoprite shopping centre. Another was placed at a Narutam pharmacy further down in the same street. The Shoprite bomb ripped through the building killing a woman and 3 children, and further injuring 67 people. The Narutam bomb disintegrated the tree and injured 2. In 2017, the same Shoprite caught ablaze and was heavily damaged.

== Notes and references ==
- Martin, Desmond (2005). The Bishop's Churches. Struik. ISBN 978-1-77007-155-1.
- Martin, Desmond (2002). The churches of Bishop Robert Gray & Mrs Sophia Gray : an historical and architectural review (PhD). UCT. hdl:11427/10637.
- Hollett, Calvin (2016). Beating against the Wind: Popular Opposition to Bishop Feild and Tractarianism in Newfoundland and Labrador. MQUP. ISBN 978-0-7735-9901-7.
- Worcester 150 Years; R.G. Grebe Worcester Municipality 1970
- Worcester Boys' High School Journal; WSEP 1968
- Theron, Paul; de Jong, A.L (1989). Boland rugby: 50 : die eerste halfeeu. Bolandse Rugby-Voetbalunie.
- Various articles from the Worcester Standard and Advertiser
- Green, Lawrence George (1957). Beyond the City Lights: The Story of the Western Province. H. Timmins.
- Museum Archive Assistance: Johannes Malgas
- The Complete Book of SA Wine; Kench, Hands & Hughes; C. Struik 1983
- Greyvenstein, Chris (1977). Springbok Saga: A Pictorial History From, 1891. D. Nelson. ISBN 978-0-909238-27-8.
