= Drostdy Technical High School =

Coordinates: 33.6491°S 19.4348°E

HTS Drostdy
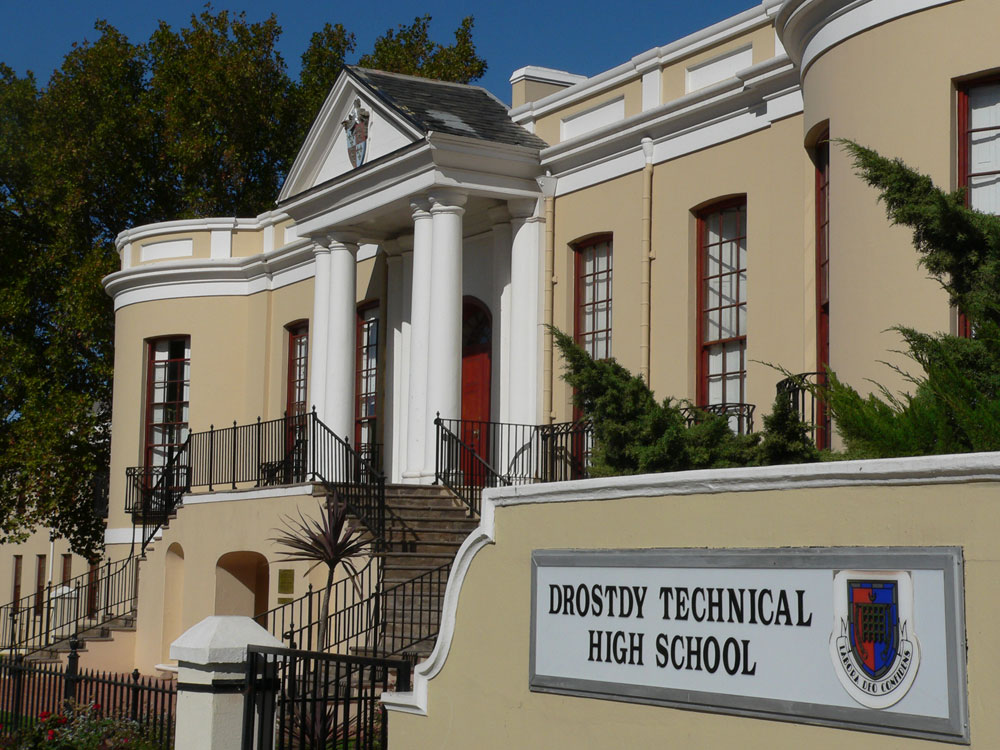
- Worcester, Western Cape; South Africa

Information
- School type: Public & Boarding school
- Established: 1903
- Principal: Louis Steijn
- Grades: 8–12
- Gender: Boys & Girls
- Enrollment: 1,000 pupils
- Language: Afrikaans
- Mascot: Donkey
- Rival: Worcester Gymnasium
- Website: https://htsdrostdy.co.za/

Drostdy Technical High School or Hoër Tegniese Skool Drostdy, as its known in Afrikaans, is an Afrikaans high school located in Worcester, South Africa and founded in 1903. Drostdy has an excellent academic and sport record. The school has managed to keep its matric pass rate well above 95% over the years.

== History ==
Drostdy has a rich history that dates back to the 1820s. In 1822 a storm heavily damaged the landrost (magistrate) building in Tulbagh Charles Trappes, Magistrate Fischer of Tulbagh recommended that Lord Charles Somerset, colonial administrator and founder of the town, move the magisterial seat to Worcester. In the beginning of 1823, construction began on the new Drostdy building. It was completed in 1825. Captain Charles Trappes was the first magistrate and first person to live in the Drostdy building. In 1893 a new magistrate's office was built in the interior of the town. The Drostdy served as the magistrate's home until the end of 1902 and was put up for sale that year.

It was purchased by the Dutch Reformed Church (NGK), and opened on 12 February 1903 as a church school for Afrikaners. Many ex soldiers of the Anglo Boer War expressed an interest in being educated, thus creating the demand for a school. In 1911 the name of the school was officially changed from "Boere Zending Skool" to Drostdy school. The number of applicants rose steadily until in 1925 the Department of Education took over the school and it become a trade school. Since 1944, the school became officially known as Hoër Tegniese Skool Drostdy (HTS).
