= List of heritage sites in Tulbagh =

This is a list of the heritage sites in Tulbagh (Cape Winelands District Municipality, Western Cape) as recognized by the South African Heritage Resources Agency.

SAHRA identifier	Site name	Description	Town	District	NHRA status	Coordinates	Image
9/2/094/0001	Drostdy, Tulbagh	The design bears little resemblance to the local architecture of the time. The small elliptical gable on short pilasters is dated 1804. There is a straight gable at the back, obviously mid-19th century. The Drostdy has a large hall. The full depth of the Construction began in 1804 on the farm Rietvlei that had belonged to a Hercules du Pré. The ex-landdrost, Bletterman of Stellenbosch, originally drew up plans for the Drostdy, but after some progress had been made, by order of landdrost Van de Graaff the design was changed to a plan by Louis- Michel Thibault. Much to the concern of Governor Janssens, the building took longer and cost more to be completed than had been anticipated, being finally finished in 1807. It is one of the few extant buildings at the Cape of which Thibault is the undisputed architect. The Drostdy had already fallen into a state of disrepair by 1822, a reason put forward for making Worcester the seat of the drostdy instead of Tulbagh. The Drostdy was sold to a young settler named Heatlie, after which it remained a private dwelling with a small farm. Towards the end of the century it again fell into disrepair, but was restored by Sir Meiring and Lady Beck. It burnt down in the mid-1930s, and was again restored. The 1969 Tulbagh earthquake caused further extensive damage. It was then acquired by the National Monuments Council and, during 1973, restored for the third time. The building is now in use as offices, reception rooms and museum The outbuildings flanking the dwelling have been demolished; the one on the right since having been rebuilt. Type of site: Drostdy.	Tulbagh	Tulbagh	Provincial Heritage Site	33°16′43″S 19°07′57″E	The design bears little resemblance to the local architecture of the time. The small elliptical gable on short pilasters is dated 1804. There is a straight gable at the back, obviously mid-19th century. The Drostdy has a large hall. The full depth of the Construction began in 1804 on the farm Rietvlei that had belonged to a Hercules du Pré. The ex-landdrost, Bletterman of Stellenbosch, originally drew up plans for the Drostdy, but after some progress had been made, by order of landdrost Van de Graaff the design was changed to a plan by Louis- Michel Thibault. Much to the concern of Governor Janssens, the building took longer and cost more to be completed than had been anticipated, being finally finished in 1807. It is one of the few extant buildings at the Cape of which Thibault is the undisputed architect. The Drostdy had already fallen into a state of disrepair by 1822, a reason put forward for making Worcester the seat of the drostdy instead of Tulbagh. The Drostdy was sold to a young settler named Heatlie, after which it remained a private dwelling with a small farm. Towards the end of the century it again fell into disrepair, but was restored by Sir Meiring and Lady Beck. It burnt down in the mid-1930s, and was again restored. The 1969 Tulbagh earthquake caused further extensive damage. It was then acquired by the National Monuments Council and, during 1973, restored for the third time. The building is now in use as offices, reception rooms and museum The outbuildings flanking the dwelling have been demolished; the one on the right since having been rebuilt. Type of site: Drostdy.
9/2/094/0003	8 Church Street, Tulbagh		Tulbagh	Tulbagh	Provincial Heritage Site	33°17′03″S 19°08′18″E	Upload Photo
9/2/094/0004	De Oude Bakkereij, 43 Van der Stel Street, Tulbagh	This house stands on the land bought from the Church by Jacob de Bruyn in 1796. It was probably built by Christiaan Willem Broodryk, who bought the top half in 1805. It is T-shaped, like no 22 Church St, with which it stands back to back. Its gable, preserved intact until the 1969 tremors made part of it collapse, is holbol but topped by a 3-lobed pediment with a vase on its face. The house had been restored previously – when it was turned into a library – but the sash windows which were then inserted were incorrect. The Simon van der Stel Foundation bought the house and had it restored. Type of site: House Previous use: Residential. Current use: House.	Tulbagh	Tulbagh	Provincial Heritage Site	33°17′17″S 19°08′21″E	This house stands on the land bought from the Church by Jacob de Bruyn in 1796. It was probably built by Christiaan Willem Broodryk, who bought the top half in 1805. It is T-shaped, like no 22 Church St, with which it stands back to back. Its gable, preserved intact until the 1969 tremors made part of it collapse, is holbol but topped by a 3-lobed pediment with a vase on its face. The house had been restored previously – when it was turned into a library – but the sash windows which were then inserted were incorrect. The Simon van der Stel Foundation bought the house and had it restored. Type of site: House Previous use: Residential. Current use: House.
9/2/094/0005	Old Dutch Reformed Mission Church, Van der Stel Street, Tulbagh	History: Tulbagh Mission Society was founded as early as 1797, though a missionary only arrived in 1811. He was Rev Arie Vos, who was attached to the London Missionary Society. He was later joined by the Rhenish missionary Gustav Zahn. In 1842 the mission was taken over by the Rhenish Mission Society. The modest chapel built in 1814 was replaced in 1844, on a piece of land donated by W. Vos. The foundation stone of this Mission Church in the Neo-Gothic style was laid in July 1844 and the church was consecrated on 2 April 1845. The fund-raising for and erection of the building was under the supervision of the Rev. G. Zahn. A bell tower was added after 1890. Visual Description: It is a fairly large, rectangular building, originally with a thatch roof. It has Gothic Revival details: buttresses, slender pointed windows, etc. The bell-tower alongside is a later structure; though it was made to match the church, it is rather crude in design. Under the Group Areas Act the Coloured congregation (now under the DR Mission Church) has vacated its old premises. The church was damaged in 1969, but has been restored.	Tulbagh	Tulbagh	Provincial Heritage Site	33°17′02″S 19°08′21″E	History: Tulbagh Mission Society was founded as early as 1797, though a missionary only arrived in 1811. He was Rev Arie Vos, who was attached to the London Missionary Society. He was later joined by the Rhenish missionary Gustav Zahn. In 1842 the mission was taken over by the Rhenish Mission Society. The modest chapel built in 1814 was replaced in 1844, on a piece of land donated by W. Vos. The foundation stone of this Mission Church in the Neo-Gothic style was laid in July 1844 and the church was consecrated on 2 April 1845. The fund-raising for and erection of the building was under the supervision of the Rev. G. Zahn. A bell tower was added after 1890. Visual Description: It is a fairly large, rectangular building, originally with a thatch roof. It has Gothic Revival details: buttresses, slender pointed windows, etc. The bell-tower alongside is a later structure; though it was made to match the church, it is rather crude in design. Under the Group Areas Act the Coloured congregation (now under the DR Mission Church) has vacated its old premises. The church was damaged in 1969, but has been restored.
9/2/094/0006	28 Church Street, Tulbagh	Type of site: House Previous use: Residential. Current use: House.	Tulbagh	Tulbagh	Provincial Heritage Site	33°17′10″S 19°08′19″E	Type of site: House Previous use: Residential. Current use: House. Media related to 28 Church Street, Tulbagh at Wikimedia Commons
9/2/094/0007	Old Gaol, Kluitjieskraal Forest Station, Tulbagh District	Type of site: Gaol.		Tulbagh	Register		Upload Photo
9/2/094/0008	De Oude Herberg, 6 Church Street, Tulbagh	Previous use: Residential. Current use: Guest house. This gabled house dates from the middle of the 19th century and also has certain Victorian characteristics.	Tulbagh	Tulbagh	Provincial Heritage Site	33°17′16″S 19°08′19″E	Previous use: Residential. Current use: Guest house. This gabled house dates from the middle of the 19th century and also has certain Victorian characteristics.
9/2/094/0009	Erf 56, Church Street, Tulbagh	The property was donated to the Council for the preservation thereof as it is an important part of the historic street scene of Church Street in Tulbagh. This erf, together with Erf 255, is virtually surrounded with declared national monuments and the concept is that it should remain undeveloped. Current use: Vacant. These properties are important elements in there stored street scene of Church Street in Tulbagh.	Tulbagh	Tulbagh	Provincial Heritage Site	33°17′02″S 19°08′16″E	Upload Photo
9/2/094/0010	Erf 255, Church Street, Tulbagh	Type of site:Vacant garden erf. The property was donated to the Council for the preservation thereof as it is an important part of the historic street scene of Church Street in Tulbagh. This erf is surrounded with declared national monuments and the concept is that it should remain undeveloped. These properties are important elements in there stored street scene of Church Street in Tulbagh.	Tulbagh	Tulbagh	Provincial Heritage Site	33°17′07″S 19°08′16″E	Upload Photo
9/2/094/0011	TULBAGH MUNICIPAL AREA, GENERAL		Tulbagh	Tulbagh	National Monument		Upload Photo
9/2/094/0012	26 Church Street, Tulbagh	Built in 1796 by Jakob de Bruin. Type of site: House Previous use: residential. Current use: Art gallery and museum.	Tulbagh	Tulbagh	Provincial Heritage Site	33°17′10″S 19°08′19″E	Built in 1796 by Jakob de Bruin. Type of site: House Previous use: residential. Current use: Art gallery and museum.
9/2/094/0013	Mon Bijou, 36 Church Street, Tulbagh	The Rev. Arnoldus M. Meiring (1743-1757) built his parsonage about one kilometre north of the little church that had been erected in the "Land of Waveren" at the middle of the eighteenth century. It stands to reason that a roadway came into being between the church and the parsonage. In the course of time the church came into possession of considerable land along this road which became known as Church Street. In 1796 the church was enlarged, and the Church Council subdivided its land along Church Street into five plots which were sold to defray the cost of the new church. De Wet House on the east side of the street is situated on one of these erven. It is one of the most dignified old buildings in Tulbagh. Catherina Magaretha de Wet had this house built about 1812. She was the widow of Jacobus de Wet, the owner of a farm, Straatskerk, a few kilometres west of Tulbagh. When her husband died in about 1807, she went to live in the town. The house is double-storeyed and shows a remarkable resemblance to Grosvenor House in Stellenbosch. Built on high foundations, it towers above the surrounding buildings. It is ascribed to Louis Michel Thibault, the well-known architect who was a frequent visitor to Tulbagh because his wife’s family lived there. Moreover, the house bears unmistakeable features of his style—the high stoep; the fine, clear-cut plasterwork; the façade and the arched roof over the stairs. After Mrs. De Wet’s death the property was bought by Pieter Francois Theron in 1822. It then passed successively to Frederik L. C. Engels, David J. de Vaal, Bernardus J. de Vaal, Adriaan Moorrees, J. P. Moller, A. J. van Wyk, C. A. Myburgh and G. C. Theron. By 1949 the old house was fairly dilapidated and in danger of being altered out of recognition but it was purchased and restored by Sir Alfred Beit on the advice of Dr. Mary Cook. Type of site: House Previous use: Residential. Current use: House.	Tulbagh	Tulbagh	Provincial Heritage Site	33°17′10″S 19°08′19″E	The Rev. Arnoldus M. Meiring (1743-1757) built his parsonage about one kilometre north of the little church that had been erected in the "Land of Waveren" at the middle of the eighteenth century. It stands to reason that a roadway came into being between the church and the parsonage. In the course of time the church came into possession of considerable land along this road which became known as Church Street. In 1796 the church was enlarged, and the Church Council subdivided its land along Church Street into five plots which were sold to defray the cost of the new church. De Wet House on the east side of the street is situated on one of these erven. It is one of the most dignified old buildings in Tulbagh. Catherina Magaretha de Wet had this house built about 1812. She was the widow of Jacobus de Wet, the owner of a farm, Straatskerk, a few kilometres west of Tulbagh. When her husband died in about 1807, she went to live in the town. The house is double-storeyed and shows a remarkable resemblance to Grosvenor House in Stellenbosch. Built on high foundations, it towers above the surrounding buildings. It is ascribed to Louis Michel Thibault, the well-known architect who was a frequent visitor to Tulbagh because his wife’s family lived there. Moreover, the house bears unmistakeable features of his style—the high stoep; the fine, clear-cut plasterwork; the façade and the arched roof over the stairs. After Mrs. De Wet’s death the property was bought by Pieter Francois Theron in 1822. It then passed successively to Frederik L. C. Engels, David J. de Vaal, Bernardus J. de Vaal, Adriaan Moorrees, J. P. Moller, A. J. van Wyk, C. A. Myburgh and G. C. Theron. By 1949 the old house was fairly dilapidated and in danger of being altered out of recognition but it was purchased and restored by Sir Alfred Beit on the advice of Dr. Mary Cook. Type of site: House Previous use: Residential. Current use: House.
9/2/094/0013-001	Erf 68, Church Street, Tulbagh		Tulbagh	Tulbagh	Provincial Heritage Site	33°17′10″S 19°08′19″E	Upload Photo
9/2/094/0013-002	Erf 72, Church Street, Tulbagh		Tulbagh	Tulbagh	Provincial Heritage Site	33°17′10″S 19°08′19″E	Upload Photo
9/2/094/0013-003	Erf 92, Church Street, Tulbagh		Tulbagh	Tulbagh	Provincial Heritage Site	33°17′10″S 19°08′19″E	Upload Photo
9/2/094/0013-004	Erf 63, Church Street, Tulbagh		Tulbagh	Tulbagh	Provincial Heritage Site	33°17′10″S 19°08′19″E	Upload Photo
9/2/094/0013-005	Erf 96, Church Street, Tulbagh	On 29 September 1969 a severe earthquake seriously damaged a number of buildings, including the historic houses in Onderstraat (Church Street), Tulbagh. They were restored through financial support of various bodies by the Tulbagh Restoration Committee.	Tulbagh	Tulbagh	Provincial Heritage Site	33°17′10″S 19°08′19″E	On 29 September 1969 a severe earthquake seriously damaged a number of buildings, including the historic houses in Onderstraat (Church Street), Tulbagh. They were restored through financial support of various bodies by the Tulbagh Restoration Committee.
9/2/094/0013-006	Erf 100, Church Street, Tulbagh	On 29 September 1969 a severe earthquake seriously damaged a number of buildings, including the historic houses in Onderstraat (Church Street), Tulbagh. They were restored through financial support of various bodies by the Tulbagh Restoration Committee.	Tulbagh	Tulbagh	Provincial Heritage Site	33°17′10″S 19°08′19″E	Upload Photo
9/2/094/0014	23 Church Street, Tulbagh	Type of site: House; Previous use: Residential. Current use: Restaurant. On 29 September 1969 a severe earthquake seriously damaged a number of buildings, including the historic houses in Onderstraat (Church Street), Tulbagh. They were restored through financial support of various bodies by the Tulbagh Restoration Committee.	Tulbagh	Tulbagh	Provincial Heritage Site	33°17′10″S 19°08′19″E	Type of site: House Previous use: Residential. Current use: Restaurant. On 29 September 1969 a severe earthquake seriously damaged a number of buildings, including the historic houses in Onderstraat (Church Street), Tulbagh. They were restored through financial support of various bodies by the Tulbagh Restoration Committee.
9/2/094/0014-001	Erf 108, Church Street, Tulbagh		Tulbagh	Tulbagh	Provincial Heritage Site	33°17′10″S 19°08′19″E	Upload Photo
9/2/094/0015	27 Church Street, Tulbagh	Type of site: House Previous use: Residential. Current use: House. On 29 September 1969 a severe earthquake seriously damaged a number of buildings, including the historic houses in Onderstraat (Church Street), Tulbagh. They were restored through financial support of various bodies by the Tulbagh Restoration Committee.	Tulbagh	Tulbagh	Provincial Heritage Site	33°17′10″S 19°08′19″E	Type of site: House Previous use: Residential. Current use: House. On 29 September 1969 a severe earthquake seriously damaged a number of buildings, including the historic houses in Onderstraat (Church Street), Tulbagh. They were restored through financial support of various bodies by the Tulbagh Restoration Committee. Media related to 27 Church Street, Tulbagh at Wikimedia Commons
9/2/094/0015-001	Erf 81, Church Street, Tulbagh	On 29 September 1969 a severe earthquake seriously damaged a number of buildings, including the historic houses in Onderstraat (Church Street), Tulbagh. They were restored through financial support of various bodies by the Tulbagh Restoration Committee.	Tulbagh	Tulbagh	Provincial Heritage Site	33°17′10″S 19°08′19″E	Upload Photo
9/2/094/0015-002	Erf 87, Church Street, Tulbagh		Tulbagh	Tulbagh	Provincial Heritage Site	33°17′10″S 19°08′19″E	Upload Photo
9/2/094/0016	Ballotina, 43 Church Street, Tulbagh	This house was probably designed by the well-known Thibault and built in 1815 for the widow of the Reverend H. W. Ballot. The strange geometric gable is exceptional. Elizabeth Wilhelmina Cruywagen, widow of Ds H. W. Ballot, after her husband's death in 1814, applied for a piece of land to build a house – she had to vacate the parsonage – all land E of Church St had already been sold, subdivided and built upon. Therefore, land was allotted on the W side of the street, opposite the pastorie, and surveyed by the younger Schutte – the boundary runs through a corner of the house. The actual grant is dated 1818. The house is U-shaped, but differs in many ways from others of its time. It has its long back-wings close together, with space only for a 2,8 m wide passage, which was roofed over from the beginning, and is the continuation of the entrance passage – the house never had a wide voorhuis, but may have had screen-like double doors with glazed upper parts. The narrow front elevation consisted of a vertically divided front door with only one large sash window on either side (this elevation was later completely changed, but could be accurately reconstructed, also because the original sliding sashes were discovered by Dr Mary Cook, present owner of the house, on a farm nearby). The great height of the ceilings in the house is also unusual. Though the side gables are of the traditional holbol type and those at the back are straight, the front gable, which in spite of the many later alterations was never removed, is unlike anything else in Church St. It has a central projecting section, crowned with a wide, segmental pediment like that of Groot Constantia, but with concave-convex lower outlines. The string-course is sharply stepped up at the ends. Part of the gable face had grooves to suggest ashlared stonework. (The date 1815 used to be faintly legible under the red paint with which the whole facade was at one time covered.) All these features suggest that a designer more sophisticated than those responsible for the other Church St houses (except, of course, no 36) was involved in building Ballotina. Who was he? Louis-Michel Thibault, the architect of the Drostdy, must have been a frequent visitor to Tulbagh during the years 1805-1807. Later, in 1812, he did work there as a land-surveyor. His wife was both a first cousin and sister-in-law of Mrs Ballot, and he could have stayed nowhere but at the Parsonage whenever he was in Tulbagh. After Ballot's death he may have provided her with a stock plan, to be carried out by local builders (he died in the year the house was built), or else he may already have given it to Ballot himself, to be used for a house to retire in. (For the pediment, cp that of the Drostdy and for the plan, cp Saasveld.) From 1870 till 1905, Ballotina was used by the State School founded by the Divisional Council. The house was restored in 1972. Type of site: House Previous use: Residential. Current use: Residential.	Tulbagh	Tulbagh	Provincial Heritage Site	33°17′10″S 19°08′19″E	This house was probably designed by the well-known Thibault and built in 1815 for the widow of the Reverend H. W. Ballot. The strange geometric gable is exceptional. Elizabeth Wilhelmina Cruywagen, widow of Ds H. W. Ballot, after her husband's death in 1814, applied for a piece of land to build a house – she had to vacate the parsonage – all land E of Church St had already been sold, subdivided and built upon. Therefore, land was allotted on the W side of the street, opposite the pastorie, and surveyed by the younger Schutte – the boundary runs through a corner of the house. The actual grant is dated 1818. The house is U-shaped, but differs in many ways from others of its time. It has its long back-wings close together, with space only for a 2,8 m wide passage, which was roofed over from the beginning, and is the continuation of the entrance passage – the house never had a wide voorhuis, but may have had screen-like double doors with glazed upper parts. The narrow front elevation consisted of a vertically divided front door with only one large sash window on either side (this elevation was later completely changed, but could be accurately reconstructed, also because the original sliding sashes were discovered by Dr Mary Cook, present owner of the house, on a farm nearby). The great height of the ceilings in the house is also unusual. Though the side gables are of the traditional holbol type and those at the back are straight, the front gable, which in spite of the many later alterations was never removed, is unlike anything else in Church St. It has a central projecting section, crowned with a wide, segmental pediment like that of Groot Constantia, but with concave-convex lower outlines. The string-course is sharply stepped up at the ends. Part of the gable face had grooves to suggest ashlared stonework. (The date 1815 used to be faintly legible under the red paint with which the whole facade was at one time covered.) All these features suggest that a designer more sophisticated than those responsible for the other Church St houses (except, of course, no 36) was involved in building Ballotina. Who was he? Louis-Michel Thibault, the architect of the Drostdy, must have been a frequent visitor to Tulbagh during the years 1805-1807. Later, in 1812, he did work there as a land-surveyor. His wife was both a first cousin and sister-in-law of Mrs Ballot, and he could have stayed nowhere but at the Parsonage whenever he was in Tulbagh. After Ballot's death he may have provided her with a stock plan, to be carried out by local builders (he died in the year the house was built), or else he may already have given it to Ballot himself, to be used for a house to retire in. (For the pediment, cp that of the Drostdy and for the plan, cp Saasveld.) From 1870 till 1905, Ballotina was used by the State School founded by the Divisional Council. The house was restored in 1972. Type of site: House Previous use: Residential. Current use: Residential. Media related to 43 Church Street, Tulbagh at Wikimedia Commons
9/2/094/0016-001	Erf 204, Waveren Street, Tulbagh		Tulbagh	Tulbagh	Provincial Heritage Site	33°16′58″S 19°08′37″E	Upload Photo
9/2/094/0017	Mission Station, Saron, Tulbagh District		Tulbagh	Tulbagh	National Monument		Upload Photo
9/2/094/0018	Wolwefontein Homestead, Tulbagh District	Characteristic of this house is the H-shaped style with a narrow opening between the main wings and a narrow overhanging roof. Around the house there are also several half-hipped gables. The barn adjacent to the main building forms an architecturally integrated part of the homestead. Type of site: Farmstead. This homestead in the typical Cape-Dutch style was probably erected early in the Nineteenth Century.		Tulbagh	Provincial Heritage Site	33°16′57″S 19°08′44″E	Upload Photo
9/2/094/0019	Schalkenbosch, Tulbagh District	The main dwelling at Schalkenbosch is a T -shaped Cape Dutch house which dates from 1798. This house with its fine front gable and straight end gables is almost identical to the adjacent Schoonderzicht. The two historic outbuildings form an integral part of the architectural complex. Type of site: Farm Complex. The main dwelling at Schalkenbosch is a T-shaped Cape Dutch house which dates from 1798.		Tulbagh	Provincial Heritage Site	33°17′05″S 19°08′21″E	The main dwelling at Schalkenbosch is a T -shaped Cape Dutch house which dates from 1798. This house with its fine front gable and straight end gables is almost identical to the adjacent Schoonderzicht. The two historic outbuildings form an integral part of the architectural complex. Type of site: Farm Complex. The main dwelling at Schalkenbosch is a T-shaped Cape Dutch house which dates from 1798.
9/2/094/0020	Jackson's Cottage, Drostdy Village, Tulbagh District		Tulbagh	Tulbagh	National Monument		Upload Photo
9/2/094/0020-001	Jackson's Cottage, Drostdy Village, Tulbagh District	This house was erected early in the Nineteenth Century in the so-called Drostdy Village to accommodate officials of the nearby Tulbagh Drostdy. The Drostdy Village was laid out in 1816. Type of site: House.		Tulbagh	Provincial Heritage Site	33°16′41″S 19°07′56″E	Upload Photo
9/2/094/0021	Old Church Museum, Tulbagh	History: Just beyond the picturesque Tulbagh Kloof the road veers left and crosses the line at the railway station. Here one enters the Tulbagh basin, formerly called the Land of Waveren. It is an area rich with history—a history best exemplified by the old church, now a museum. Because the old passes were so difficult to negotiate, the pion cattle farmers in this area lived in great isolation, cut off especially from church and cultural activities; those that trekked down the Breede River were even more out of contact with the church or the government. Commissioner Gustav van Imhoff believed that the church was one of the most powerful cohesive forces in a community and recommended that more churches should be built in the interior of the country. In this way the Roodezand congregation came to be established in 1743. In the same year the Rev. Arnoldus Mauritius Meiring, the progenitor of the Meiring family in South Africa, . arrived at the Cape from the Netherlands. After an eventful voyage during which he lost his wife, he was appointed minister to the Roodezand congregation. Mr. Meiring’s first task was to give effect to Van Imhoff’s recommendation that a church should be built there. A simple little cruciform church was designed. Much of thç material, including the typical small so- called "Batavian" bricks, was imported from Holland, and the floor was paved with slate. The building was done, for the most part, by two members of the con gregation, Jacs. Theron and Francois du Toit; the brickwork and the solid woodwork hear witness to their skill. In 1796 the church was enlarged by extending the front by 3 metres and building a gallery. At the same time the fine baroque gable was built, as well as an attractive boundary wall round the church and graveyard. Mr. Meiring served the congregation until his death on 23 April 1757. The church and its original pulpit remained in use until 1878. After Mr. Meiring’s death he was succeeded by the Rev. R. Harders (1758-1774); the Rev. J. A. Kuys (1777-1787 and 1789-1794); the Rev. M. C. Vos (1794-1802); the Rev. H. W. Ballot (1803-1814); the Rev. J. J. Kicherer (1814-1825); Dr. George Thom (1825-1833); the Rev. Robert Shand (1834-1871) and the Rev. W. Rdbertson (1871-1883). When a new and bigger church was built in 1878, the "old" church served as school and as a hall for holding bazaars and other activities and in 1925 it became an historical museum." Visual Description: It had a plan in the shape of a Greek cross, as was traditional for the earliest Cape churches (except Drakenstein and the first one in Stellenbosch). This was an appropriate adaptation of the wing-construction of the Cape farmsteads to the centralized Protestant 'pulpit churches' of the Netherlands. In 1795 the church was enlarged (out of money raised by selling Church St.erven and by borrowing from the Moederkerk in the Cape) by the addition of about 3 m to the length of the E arm, which now became the front, the original entrance having been at the S, turned away from the street and towards the former course of the wagon road. The W wing was extended by a similar distance; this became the vestry. Galleries were built in the 3 other arms. At the same time the gable over the new entrance was built, an ornate holbol one of the type that, nearer Cape Town, would have belonged to the 1780s; it is unusual in being used as an end-gable here. The ends of the other 3 arms are half-hipped. The plaster pediment over the wide, vertically divided door, as well as the pilasters and swags flanking it and the heavy architrave, probably also date from this time, though stylistically they clash with the ornate baroque gable, as do the urn and swag on its face. But this, of course, can be expected in this transition period and far from the Cape. The windows have half-round heads. The interior of the church is of great simplicity and dignity of atmosphere. There is no ceiling, and the roof timbers are left exposed. The flagged slate floor is fairly recent and replaced a clay floor, such as nearly all Tulbagh houses originally had. Of great beauty is the pulpit, of stinkwood and beefwood, with its octagonal canopy and barley-sugar-turned posts. It may date from the earliest years of the existence of the church and, if so, is the oldest extant pulpit in the country. It was well restored by Lady Beck. In the churchyard, surrounded by a white wall – erected in 1795 – stands an early burial vault. The church fell into disuse as such in 1878, when a new one, by Hager, was taken into use (since demolished). After having been used as a school for a couple of years, it stood empty and fell into disrepair – not improved by the reputed use made of it during the Boer War, namely to house English troops. The old church was restored in 1914 and again in 1923 after it had, on the initiative of Lady Meiring Beck, been decided to turn it into a museum. After minor earthquake damage in 1969 it was once again restored, whereby some previous mistakes – eg the gate pillars – could be undone, and the date 1743 on the gable changed back to 1795. Type of site: Church, Museum Previous use: Church. Current use: Museum. This building is the oldest church building in the Cape still standing more or less in its original form.	Tulbagh	Tulbagh	Provincial Heritage Site	33°17′19″S 19°08′16″E	History: Just beyond the picturesque Tulbagh Kloof the road veers left and crosses the line at the railway station. Here one enters the Tulbagh basin, formerly called the Land of Waveren. It is an area rich with history—a history best exemplified by the old church, now a museum. Because the old passes were so difficult to negotiate, the pion cattle farmers in this area lived in great isolation, cut off especially from church and cultural activities; those that trekked down the Breede River were even more out of contact with the church or the government. Commissioner Gustav van Imhoff believed that the church was one of the most powerful cohesive forces in a community and recommended that more churches should be built in the interior of the country. In this way the Roodezand congregation came to be established in 1743. In the same year the Rev. Arnoldus Mauritius Meiring, the progenitor of the Meiring family in South Africa, . arrived at the Cape from the Netherlands. After an eventful voyage during which he lost his wife, he was appointed minister to the Roodezand congregation. Mr. Meiring’s first task was to give effect to Van Imhoff’s recommendation that a church should be built there. A simple little cruciform church was designed. Much of thç material, including the typical small so- called "Batavian" bricks, was imported from Holland, and the floor was paved with slate. The building was done, for the most part, by two members of the con gregation, Jacs. Theron and Francois du Toit; the brickwork and the solid woodwork hear witness to their skill. In 1796 the church was enlarged by extending the front by 3 metres and building a gallery. At the same time the fine baroque gable was built, as well as an attractive boundary wall round the church and graveyard. Mr. Meiring served the congregation until his death on 23 April 1757. The church and its original pulpit remained in use until 1878. After Mr. Meiring’s death he was succeeded by the Rev. R. Harders (1758-1774); the Rev. J. A. Kuys (1777-1787 and 1789-1794); the Rev. M. C. Vos (1794-1802); the Rev. H. W. Ballot (1803-1814); the Rev. J. J. Kicherer (1814-1825); Dr. George Thom (1825-1833); the Rev. Robert Shand (1834-1871) and the Rev. W. Rdbertson (1871-1883). When a new and bigger church was built in 1878, the "old" church served as school and as a hall for holding bazaars and other activities and in 1925 it became an historical museum." Visual Description: It had a plan in the shape of a Greek cross, as was traditional for the earliest Cape churches (except Drakenstein and the first one in Stellenbosch). This was an appropriate adaptation of the wing-construction of the Cape farmsteads to the centralized Protestant 'pulpit churches' of the Netherlands. In 1795 the church was enlarged (out of money raised by selling Church St.erven and by borrowing from the Moederkerk in the Cape) by the addition of about 3 m to the length of the E arm, which now became the front, the original entrance having been at the S, turned away from the street and towards the former course of the wagon road. The W wing was extended by a similar distance; this became the vestry. Galleries were built in the 3 other arms. At the same time the gable over the new entrance was built, an ornate holbol one of the type that, nearer Cape Town, would have belonged to the 1780s; it is unusual in being used as an end-gable here. The ends of the other 3 arms are half-hipped. The plaster pediment over the wide, vertically divided door, as well as the pilasters and swags flanking it and the heavy architrave, probably also date from this time, though stylistically they clash with the ornate baroque gable, as do the urn and swag on its face. But this, of course, can be expected in this transition period and far from the Cape. The windows have half-round heads. The interior of the church is of great simplicity and dignity of atmosphere. There is no ceiling, and the roof timbers are left exposed. The flagged slate floor is fairly recent and replaced a clay floor, such as nearly all Tulbagh houses originally had. Of great beauty is the pulpit, of stinkwood and beefwood, with its octagonal canopy and barley-sugar-turned posts. It may date from the earliest years of the existence of the church and, if so, is the oldest extant pulpit in the country. It was well restored by Lady Beck. In the churchyard, surrounded by a white wall – erected in 1795 – stands an early burial vault. The church fell into disuse as such in 1878, when a new one, by Hager, was taken into use (since demolished). After having been used as a school for a couple of years, it stood empty and fell into disrepair – not improved by the reputed use made of it during the Boer War, namely to house English troops. The old church was restored in 1914 and again in 1923 after it had, on the initiative of Lady Meiring Beck, been decided to turn it into a museum. After minor earthquake damage in 1969 it was once again restored, whereby some previous mistakes – eg the gate pillars – could be undone, and the date 1743 on the gable changed back to 1795. Type of site: Church, Museum Previous use: Church. Current use: Museum. This building is the oldest church building in the Cape still standing more or less in its original form. Media related to Old Church Museum, Tulbagh at Wikimedia Commons
9/2/094/0022	Schoonderzicht, Tulbagh District	The farm Schoonderzicht was originally granted to P. J. Theron in 1796 although the main gable of the homestead bears the date 1795. A striking feature of the homestead is its concavo-convex ("holbol") gable with fine decorations. The house was built in Type of site: Farm Complex. A striking feature of the homestead is its concavo-convex ("holbol") gable with fine decorations. The house was built in the shape of a T with three gables, and much of its original woodwork and other materials are still intact. Historically and architecturally, the adjacent barn is an integral part of the complex.		Tulbagh	Provincial Heritage Site	33°17′05″S 19°08′21″E	Upload Photo
9/2/094/0022/001	Brandy still, Schoonderzicht, Tulbagh District	Type of site: Brandy Still. This copper brandy still is one of the few remaining working stills of its kind in South Africa.		Tulbagh	Heritage Object		Upload Photo
9/2/094/0022/1	Brandy still, Schoonderzicht, Tulbagh District		Tulbagh	Tulbagh	National Monument		Upload Photo
9/2/094/0023	Klipfontein, Tulbagh District	It is T -shaped with an enormously long front wing because part of the outbuildings links up with the house. This property was granted to Jacob de Bruin in 1818 and the main building also dates from this period. It is T -shaped with an enormously long front wing because part of the outbuildings links up with the house. Type of site: Farm Complex.		Tulbagh	Provincial Heritage Site	33°17′09″S 19°08′28″E	Upload Photo
9/2/094/0024	Montpellier, Tulbagh	This fine example of a Cape-Dutch gabled house with its concavo-convex ("holbol") gable was probably built early in the Nineteenth Century on the farm which was originally granted in 1714 to Jean Joubert. Montpellier was granted to Jean Joubert, a Huguen. This fine example of a Cape-Dutch gabled house with its concavo-convex ("holbol") gable was probably built early in the Nineteenth Century on the farm which was originally granted in 1714 to Jean Joubert.	Tulbagh	Tulbagh	Provincial Heritage Site	33°16′11″S 19°08′29″E	This fine example of a Cape-Dutch gabled house with its concavo-convex ("holbol") gable was probably built early in the Nineteenth Century on the farm which was originally granted in 1714 to Jean Joubert. Montpellier was granted to Jean Joubert, a Huguen. This fine example of a Cape-Dutch gabled house with its concavo-convex ("holbol") gable was probably built early in the Nineteenth Century on the farm which was originally granted in 1714 to Jean Joubert.
9/2/094/0025	Meiring House, Van der Stel Street, Tulbagh	A Victorianization of a mid-19th century 2-rooms-deep house with high thatch roof and pointed gable. Type of site: House Previous use: Residential. Current use: House.	Tulbagh	Tulbagh	Provincial Heritage Site	33°17′06″S 19°08′21″E	Upload Photo
9/2/094/0026	22 Church Street, Tulbagh	This property was sold in 1796 by the local Church Council to J. de Bruyn when money was needed for the enlargement of the church building. The house was erected shortly afterwards and is characterised by its concavo convex gable and its T-shaped style. J Type of site: House Previous use: Residential. Current use: Museum Annex.	Tulbagh	Tulbagh	Provincial Heritage Site	33°17′10″S 19°08′19″E	This property was sold in 1796 by the local Church Council to J. de Bruyn when money was needed for the enlargement of the church building. The house was erected shortly afterwards and is characterised by its concavo convex gable and its T-shaped style. J Type of site: House Previous use: Residential. Current use: Museum Annex. Media related to 22 Church Street, Tulbagh at Wikimedia Commons
9/2/094/0027	24 Church Street, Tulbagh	This house was built in about 1820 by a Mr De Lange and is the only H-shaped gabled house in the restored Church Street in Tulbagh. Type of site: House Previous use: Residential. Current use: House.	Tulbagh	Tulbagh	Provincial Heritage Site	33°17′10″S 19°08′19″E	This house was built in about 1820 by a Mr De Lange and is the only H-shaped gabled house in the restored Church Street in Tulbagh. Type of site: House Previous use: Residential. Current use: House. Media related to 24 Church Street, Tulbagh at Wikimedia Commons
9/2/094/0028	18 Church Street, Tulbagh	This Victorian house is situated on a piece of land which was sold in 1853 to E. French and forms an important element in the street scene of Church Street, Tulbagh. Type of site: House Previous use: Residential. Current use: House.	Tulbagh	Tulbagh	Provincial Heritage Site	33°17′10″S 19°08′19″E	This Victorian house is situated on a piece of land which was sold in 1853 to E. French and forms an important element in the street scene of Church Street, Tulbagh. Type of site: House Previous use: Residential. Current use: House.
9/2/094/0029	40 Church Street, Tulbagh	The house is T-shaped with straight end gables and a concavo-convex front gable. This property was sold to Magteld Combrink in 1801, and she probably had the Cape-Dutch house erected shortly afterwards. Type of site: House Previous use: Residential. Current use: House.	Tulbagh	Tulbagh	Provincial Heritage Site	33°17′10″S 19°08′19″E	The house is T-shaped with straight end gables and a concavo-convex front gable. This property was sold to Magteld Combrink in 1801, and she probably had the Cape-Dutch house erected shortly afterwards. Type of site: House Previous use: Residential. Current use: House.
9/2/094/0030	10 Church Street, Tulbagh	This property was sold in 1880 by the local Church Council to D. H. Malherbe. The house was erected shortly afterwards and is in the Victorian style. Type of site: House Previous use: Residential. Current use: House.	Tulbagh	Tulbagh	Provincial Heritage Site	33°17′10″S 19°08′19″E	This property was sold in 1880 by the local Church Council to D. H. Malherbe. The house was erected shortly afterwards and is in the Victorian style. Type of site: House Previous use: Residential. Current use: House.
9/2/094/0031	De La Rey House, 36 Van der Stel Street, Tulbagh	Church Street and Van der Stel Street are two parallel thoroughfares in Tulbagh. In these old streets a number of buildings have survived that give a true reflection of the character of the village in the eighteenth century. One of them is now the public library. Like De Wet House, it stands on a portion of a plot in Church Street that was sold by the Church Council in 1796 to defray the cost of the new, larger church. The plot was trans ferred to Jacob de Bruijn, who sold the northern portion of it to Christiaan Willem Broodryk in 1805. It was Broodryk who built the T-shaped house with a concavo convex front gable. The "brandsolder" with reed ceiling in the front room is especially worthy of mention. Type of site: House Previous use: Residential. Current use: House. Because of its architectural merits and situation, this historic house forms an important element in the street scene of the restored part of Tulbagh.	Tulbagh	Tulbagh	Provincial Heritage Site	33°17′13″S 19°08′22″E	Church Street and Van der Stel Street are two parallel thoroughfares in Tulbagh. In these old streets a number of buildings have survived that give a true reflection of the character of the village in the eighteenth century. One of them is now the public library. Like De Wet House, it stands on a portion of a plot in Church Street that was sold by the Church Council in 1796 to defray the cost of the new, larger church. The plot was trans ferred to Jacob de Bruijn, who sold the northern portion of it to Christiaan Willem Broodryk in 1805. It was Broodryk who built the T-shaped house with a concavo convex front gable. The "brandsolder" with reed ceiling in the front room is especially worthy of mention. Type of site: House Previous use: Residential. Current use: House. Because of its architectural merits and situation, this historic house forms an important element in the street scene of the restored part of Tulbagh.
9/2/094/0032	34 Church Street, Tulbagh	The U-shaped Cape-Dutch house on this property was erected in about 1800 and has a concavo-convex gable in front. The erven form an important part of the street scene of the historic Church Street in Tulbagh. Type of site: House. Previous use: Residential. Current use: Residential.	Tulbagh	Tulbagh	Provincial Heritage Site	33°17′10″S 19°08′19″E	The U-shaped Cape-Dutch house on this property was erected in about 1800 and has a concavo-convex gable in front. The erven form an important part of the street scene of the historic Church Street in Tulbagh. Type of site: House. Previous use: Residential. Current use: Residential.
9/2/094/0032-001	Erf 74, Church Street, Tulbagh		Tulbagh	Tulbagh	Provincial Heritage Site	33°17′10″S 19°08′19″E	Upload Photo
9/2/094/0032-002	Erf 93, Church Street, Tulbagh	The U-shaped Cape-Dutch house on this property was erected in about 1800 and has a concavo-convex gable in front. The erven form an important part of the street scene of the historic Church Street in Tulbagh.	Tulbagh	Tulbagh	Provincial Heritage Site	33°17′10″S 19°08′19″E	Upload Photo
9/2/094/0033	16 Church Street, Tulbagh	This oblong, thatched house without a front gable is situated on land which was sold by the local church to a widow, Mrs S. W. van der Merwe, and her son in 1853. The house probably dates from an earlier period. Type of site: House Previous use: Residential. Current use: House.	Tulbagh	Tulbagh	Provincial Heritage Site	33°17′10″S 19°08′19″E	This oblong, thatched house without a front gable is situated on land which was sold by the local church to a widow, Mrs S. W. van der Merwe, and her son in 1853. The house probably dates from an earlier period. Type of site: House Previous use: Residential. Current use: House.
9/2/094/0034	20 Church Street, Tulbagh	This plot was originally granted in 1818 to J. Marais. The original historic wagon-house still exists. Type of site: Public open space Current use: Public Open Space; Public conveniences. This plot was originally granted in 1818 to J. Marais. The original historic wagon-house still exists. This property forms an important element in the street scene of Tulbagh.	Tulbagh	Tulbagh	Provincial Heritage Site	33°17′10″S 19°08′19″E	Upload Photo
9/2/094/0035	30 Van der Stel Street, Tulbagh		Tulbagh	Tulbagh	Provincial Heritage Site	33°17′11″S 19°08′21″E	
9/2/094/0036	32 Church Street, Tulbagh	Type of site: House Previous use: Residential. Current use: House.	Tulbagh	Tulbagh	Provincial Heritage Site	33°17′10″S 19°08′19″E	Type of site: House Previous use: Residential. Current use: House.
9/2/094/0037	SARON, TULBAGH DISTRICT, GENERAL		Tulbagh	Tulbagh	National Monument		Upload Photo
9/2/094/0038	4 Church Street, Tulbagh	Type of site: House Previous use: Residential. Current use: Museum.	Tulbagh	Tulbagh	Provincial Heritage Site	33°17′21″S 19°08′20″E	Type of site: House Previous use: Residential. Current use: Museum.
9/2/094/0038-001	Erf 119, Church Street, Tulbagh		Tulbagh	Tulbagh	Provincial Heritage Site	33°17′10″S 19°08′19″E	Upload Photo
9/2/094/0039	12 Church Street, Tulbagh	History: Built between 1754 and 1756 by the surgeon Nicolaas Fuchs, the house is the oldest in Tulbagh. After Fuch’s death two years later the Kerkraad bought the property and the house he had built on it, in order to accommodate the newly arrived "voorleser" H. A. Bruggeman. A buitekamer was used as school room and in 1818 a separate room was built for this purpose behind the house and connected with it by means of a flat roofed section. The house remained church property until 1875, when it was bought by W. Theron, father of SA War hero Danie Theron. Visual Description: Due to the slightly oblique placing of the house in relation to Church Street, it is clear that the house predates the laying of this street. Its fenestration is irregular and the pointed gable which is peculiar to Tulbagh is probably 19th century. The house was extensively Victorianised, but has been returned to its appearance circa 1861. Type of site: House Previous use: Residential. Current use: House.	Tulbagh	Tulbagh	Provincial Heritage Site	33°17′10″S 19°08′19″E	History: Built between 1754 and 1756 by the surgeon Nicolaas Fuchs, the house is the oldest in Tulbagh. After Fuch’s death two years later the Kerkraad bought the property and the house he had built on it, in order to accommodate the newly arrived "voorleser" H. A. Bruggeman. A buitekamer was used as school room and in 1818 a separate room was built for this purpose behind the house and connected with it by means of a flat roofed section. The house remained church property until 1875, when it was bought by W. Theron, father of SA War hero Danie Theron. Visual Description: Due to the slightly oblique placing of the house in relation to Church Street, it is clear that the house predates the laying of this street. Its fenestration is irregular and the pointed gable which is peculiar to Tulbagh is probably 19th century. The house was extensively Victorianised, but has been returned to its appearance circa 1861. Type of site: House Previous use: Residential. Current use: House.
9/2/094/0040	14 Church Street, Tulbagh	Previous use: Residential.	Tulbagh	Tulbagh	Provincial Heritage Site	33°17′10″S 19°08′19″E	Previous use: Residential.
9/2/094/0041	Erf 109, 17 Church Street, Tulbagh	Type of site: House. Previous use: Residential. Current use: House.	Tulbagh	Tulbagh	Provincial Heritage Site	33°17′10″S 19°08′19″E	Type of site: House. Previous use: Residential. Current use: House.
9/2/094/0041-001	Erf 110, Adj 17 Church Street, Tulbagh	On 29 September 1969 a severe earthquake seriously damaged a number of buildings, including the historic houses in Onderstraat (Church Street), Tulbagh. They were restored through financial support of various bodies by the Tulbagh Restoration Committee.	Tulbagh	Tulbagh	Provincial Heritage Site	33°17′10″S 19°08′19″E	On 29 September 1969 a severe earthquake seriously damaged a number of buildings, including the historic houses in Onderstraat (Church Street), Tulbagh. They were restored through financial support of various bodies by the Tulbagh Restoration Committee.
9/2/094/0042	25 Church Street, Tulbagh	Type of site: House Previous use: Residential. Current use: House.	Tulbagh	Tulbagh	Provincial Heritage Site	33°17′10″S 19°08′19″E	Type of site: House Previous use: Residential. Current use: House.
9/2/094/0043	30 Church Street, Tulbagh	Type of site: House Previous use: Residential. Current use: House. On 29 September 1969 a severe earthquake seriously damaged a number of buildings, including the historic houses in Onderstraat (Church Street), Tulbagh. They were restored through financial support of various bodies by the Tulbagh Restoration Committee.	Tulbagh	Tulbagh	Provincial Heritage Site	33°17′10″S 19°08′19″E	Type of site: House Previous use: Residential. Current use: House. On 29 September 1969 a severe earthquake seriously damaged a number of buildings, including the historic houses in Onderstraat (Church Street), Tulbagh. They were restored through financial support of various bodies by the Tulbagh Restoration Committee.
9/2/094/0043-001	Erf 77, Church Street, Tulbagh	On 29 September 1969 a severe earthquake seriously damaged a number of buildings, including the historic houses in Onderstraat (Church Street), Tulbagh. They were restored through financial support of various bodies by the Tulbagh Restoration Committee.	Tulbagh	Tulbagh	Provincial Heritage Site	33°17′10″S 19°08′19″E	Upload Photo
9/2/094/0043-002	Erf 97, Church Street, Tulbagh		Tulbagh	Tulbagh	Provincial Heritage Site	33°17′10″S 19°08′19″E	Upload Photo
9/2/094/0044	38 Church Street, Tulbagh	This house and no 40 stand on land transferred by the Church to the Onderchirurgyn, F. J. de Lamour Manille – a character as colourful as his name. He probably never really owned the place but sold it immediately to H. J. Wydeman, who must have built the house on it, for this is mentioned in the next transfer, in 1804. The simple, rectangular house without front gable was the only one in Church Street not to survive the 1969 disaster. It has been rebuilt in its original form. Type of site: House Previous use: Residential. Current use: Commercial.	Tulbagh	Tulbagh	Provincial Heritage Site	33°17′10″S 19°08′19″E	This house and no 40 stand on land transferred by the Church to the Onderchirurgyn, F. J. de Lamour Manille – a character as colourful as his name. He probably never really owned the place but sold it immediately to H. J. Wydeman, who must have built the house on it, for this is mentioned in the next transfer, in 1804. The simple, rectangular house without front gable was the only one in Church Street not to survive the 1969 disaster. It has been rebuilt in its original form. Type of site: House Previous use: Residential. Current use: Commercial.
9/2/094/0044-001	Erf 61, Church Street, Tulbagh		Tulbagh	Tulbagh	Provincial Heritage Site	33°17′10″S 19°08′19″E	Upload Photo
9/2/094/0044-002	Erf 67, Church Street, Tulbagh		Tulbagh	Tulbagh	Provincial Heritage Site	33°17′10″S 19°08′19″E	Upload Photo
9/2/094/0044-003	Erf 55, Church Street, Tulbagh		Tulbagh	Tulbagh	Provincial Heritage Site	33°17′10″S 19°08′19″E	Upload Photo
9/2/094/0044-004	Erf 52, Church Street, Tulbagh		Tulbagh	Tulbagh	Provincial Heritage Site	33°17′10″S 19°08′19″E	
9/2/094/0044-005	Erf 58, Church Street, Tulbagh		Tulbagh	Tulbagh	Provincial Heritage Site	33°17′10″S 19°08′19″E	Upload Photo
9/2/094/0044-006	Erf 51, Church Street, Tulbagh		Tulbagh	Tulbagh	Provincial Heritage Site	33°17′10″S 19°08′19″E	Upload Photo
9/2/094/0044-007	Erf 57, Church Street, Tulbagh		Tulbagh	Tulbagh	Provincial Heritage Site	33°17′10″S 19°08′19″E	Upload Photo
9/2/094/0044-008	Erf 50, Church Street, Tulbagh		Tulbagh	Tulbagh	Provincial Heritage Site	33°17′10″S 19°08′19″E	Upload Photo
9/2/094/0045	42 Church Street, Tulbagh	History: This erf, the most N of those sold by the Kerkraad in 1796, was bought by Hendrik Vos, brother of the predikant at the time (who lived in the parsonage, across the road, and was therefore his neighbour). When the predikant left a few years later, however, Hendrik sold the property, with a house on it. It changed hands. frequently until it was acquired by the break-away Kruisvallei congregation in 1870, to serve as their parsonage. For a while, therefore, the ministers of the 2 rival factions had to pass each other every Sunday on their way to their respective churches. The house later also served as hostel for school children; it was then given an upper floor and other additions. These were all undone during the 1971-1972 restoration, as well as Victorian details. The house features prominently in a drawing by Burchell done in 1811, and its N aspect could be reconstructed accordingly. The front gable, however, is not clearly visible in the 1861 photograph; it was rebuilt very similarly to those of nos 24 and 26. The house was bought by Rembrandt and is used for public gatherings.	Tulbagh	Tulbagh	Provincial Heritage Site	33°17′10″S 19°08′19″E	History: This erf, the most N of those sold by the Kerkraad in 1796, was bought by Hendrik Vos, brother of the predikant at the time (who lived in the parsonage, across the road, and was therefore his neighbour). When the predikant left a few years later, however, Hendrik sold the property, with a house on it. It changed hands. frequently until it was acquired by the break-away Kruisvallei congregation in 1870, to serve as their parsonage. For a while, therefore, the ministers of the 2 rival factions had to pass each other every Sunday on their way to their respective churches. The house later also served as hostel for school children; it was then given an upper floor and other additions. These were all undone during the 1971-1972 restoration, as well as Victorian details. The house features prominently in a drawing by Burchell done in 1811, and its N aspect could be reconstructed accordingly. The front gable, however, is not clearly visible in the 1861 photograph; it was rebuilt very similarly to those of nos 24 and 26. The house was bought by Rembrandt and is used for public gatherings. Media related to 42 Church Street, Tulbagh at Wikimedia Commons
9/2/094/0045-001	Erf 202, Church Street, Tulbagh		Tulbagh	Tulbagh	Provincial Heritage Site	33°17′10″S 19°08′19″E	Upload Photo
9/2/094/0045-002	Erf 205, Church Street, Tulbagh		Tulbagh	Tulbagh	Provincial Heritage Site	33°17′10″S 19°08′19″E	Upload Photo
9/2/094/0045-003	Erf 206, Church Street, Tulbagh	On 29 September 1969 a severe earthquake seriously damaged a number of buildings, including the historic houses in Onderstraat (Church Street), Tulbagh. They were restored through financial support of various bodies by the Tulbagh Restoration Committee.	Tulbagh	Tulbagh	Provincial Heritage Site	33°17′10″S 19°08′19″E	Upload Photo
9/2/094/0046	51a Van der Stel Street, Tulbagh	Single Storey gabled cape house with holbol end gables. Double casement (3x4) windows in front gable which is dated 1813, and which has an unusual squat feel, but after Thibault in character. It has single casements (3x5) on either side of the door, and double casements beyond. Type of site: House Previous use: Residential. Current use: House. High intrinsic value and contributes significantly to the town. Excellent example of formal Cape gabled house with interesting squat, pedimented gable.	Tulbagh	Tulbagh	Provincial Heritage Site	33°17′21″S 19°08′21″E	Upload Photo
9/2/094/0047	21 Church Street, Tulbagh	Type of site: House Previous use: Residential. Current use: House.	Tulbagh	Tulbagh	Provincial Heritage Site	33°17′10″S 19°08′19″E	Type of site: House Previous use: Residential. Current use: House.
9/2/094/0048	TULBAGH MAGISTERIAL DISTRICT, GENERAL		Tulbagh	Tulbagh	National Monument		Upload Photo
9/2/094/0049	WOLSELEY LOCAL AREA, GENERAL		Wolseley	Tulbagh			Upload Photo
9/2/094/0050	GOUDA LOCAL AREA, GENERAL		Gouda	Tulbagh			Upload Photo
9/2/094/0051	Old Rhenish Church-and-School, Steinthal, Tulbagh District	Type of site: School, Church Current use: School.		Tulbagh	Provincial Heritage Site		Upload Photo
9/2/094/0052	33 Church Street, Erf 106, Tulbagh		Tulbagh	Tulbagh	National Monument	33°17′04″S 19°08′18″E	Upload Photo
9/2/094/0060	Anglo-Boer War blockhouse, Tulbagh Road, Tulbagh District	Type of site: Blockhouse Previous use: Fortification.		Tulbagh	Deproclaimed	33°24′55″S 19°10′15″E	Type of site: Blockhouse Previous use: Fortification. Media related to Wolseley Blockhouse at Wikimedia Commons
