= Boland, Western Cape =

Region of the Western Cape, South Africa

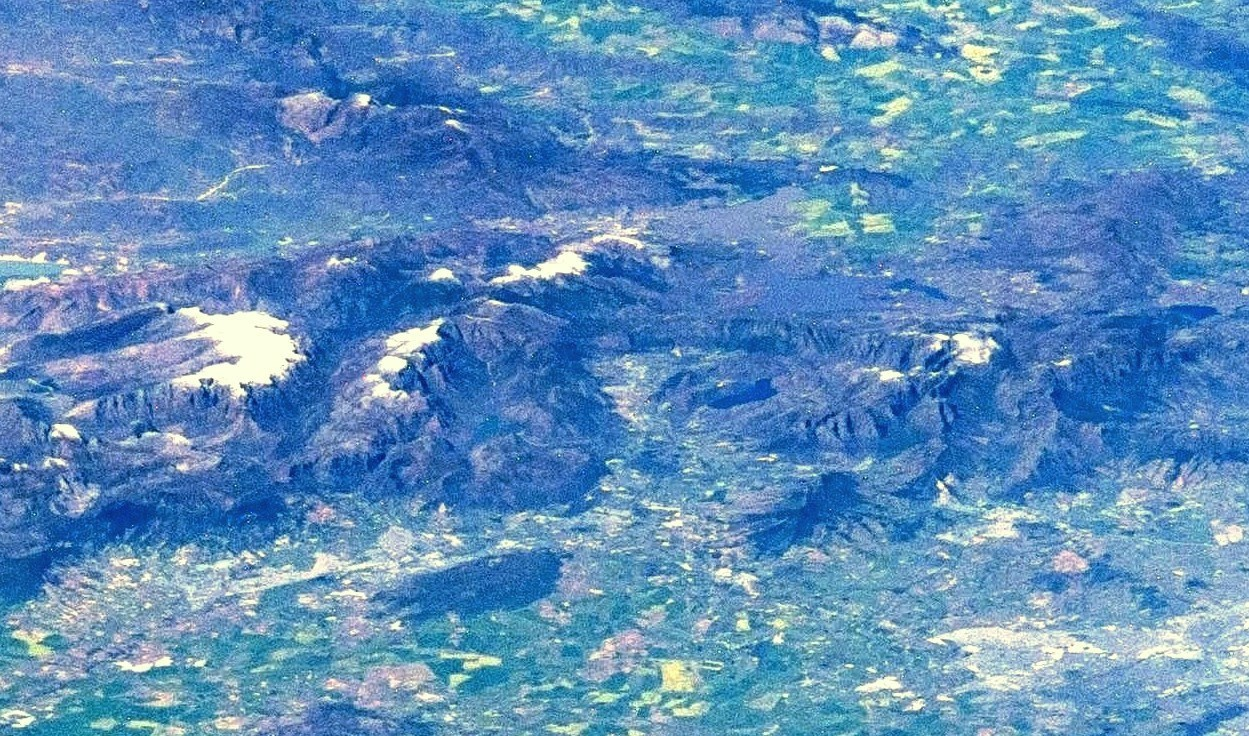
View of the Boland region from space

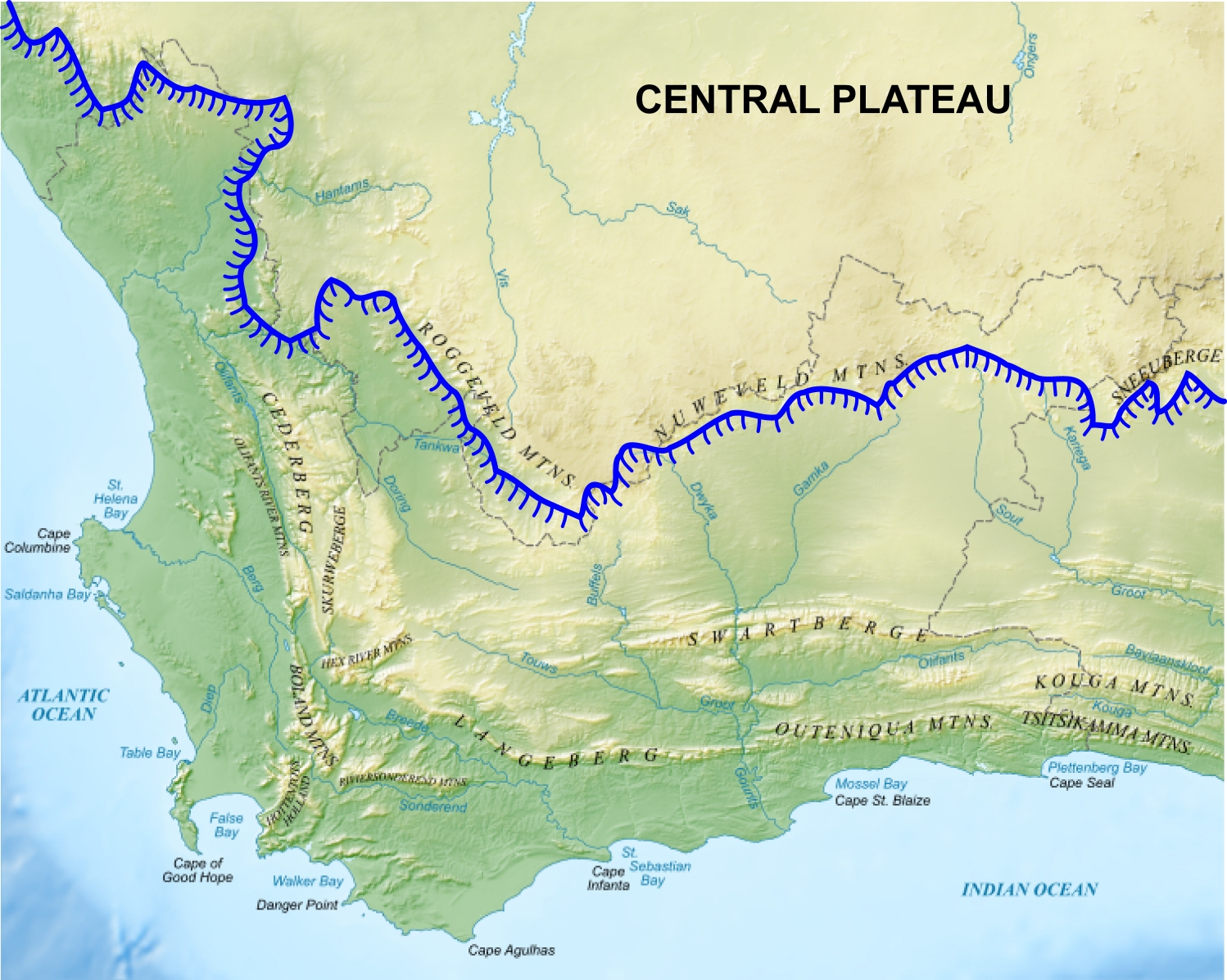
Western Cape topology showing the Boland Mountains.

The Boland (Afrikaans pronunciation: [ˈbuəlant], meaning "highland") is a region of the Western Cape province of South Africa, situated to the northeast of Cape Town in the middle and upper courses of the Berg and Breede Rivers, around the Boland Mountains of the central Cape Fold Belt. It is sometimes also referred to as the Cape Winelands because it is the primary region for the making of Western Cape wine.

== Geography ==
Although the Boland does not have defined boundaries, its core lies around the Boland Mountains and the towns of Stellenbosch, Paarl and Worcester. It may be understood to extend as far as Malmesbury, Tulbagh, Swellendam, Somerset West, Brackenfell, Kuilsrivier and Durbanville. This is approximately the area included in the Cape Winelands District Municipality, which was formerly called the Boland District Municipality. To the southwest lies the Cape Town metropolitan area, to the northwest the Swartland and West Coast, to the northeast the Great Karoo, to the east the Little Karoo, and to the south the Overberg.

The catchment area of the Boland Mountains feeds the Berg, Breede and Riviersonderend rivers, and provides almost the entire water source for Cape Town.

== Popular culture ==
The "Boland" name is given to a number of sports teams from the region, including the Boland cricket team and the Boland Cavaliers rugby union team.
