= Beefwood =

Beefwood is the name given to a number of Australian trees which have timber with a red colouration resembling raw beef as follows:

- Barringtonia calyptrata, also known as Cornbeefwood.
- Barringtonia racemosa, also known as Cornbeefwood.
- Bischofia javanica
- Floydia praealta (Syn.: Macadamia praealta)
- Grevillea glauca, also known as Beefwood tree.
- Grevillea parallela, also known as Narrow-leaved Beefwood.
- Grevillea striata, also known as Western Beefwood.
- Orites excelsa, also known as White Beefwood.
- Stenocarpus salignus also known as Killarney Beefwood or Scrub Beefwood.
- Stenocarpus sinuatus also known as White Beefwood.

Some Casuarinaceae species are also referred to as Beefwoods, Casuarina equisetifolia, Casuarina cunninghamiana, Allocasuarina verticillata, Allocasuarina distyla (Syn.: Casuarina stricta) etc.

Furthers:

- also Manilkara bidentata and Manilkara spp. from South and Central America and the Caribbean
- and Swartzia panacoco (Syn.: Robinia panacoco), Swartzia tomentosa, Rhizophora mangle

In German also the term „Pferdefleischholz“; Horseflesh wood or „Bulletrie-, Bolletrieholz“ is given to these woods

Others are:

- Ardisia escallonioides
- Guapira fragrans, Guapira obtusata, Guapira discolor
- Myrsine coriacea (Syn.: Ardisia coriacea)
- Roupala montana, from Middle America to North South America
- Schoepfia spp, Schoepfia obovata White Beefwood, Schoepfia schreberi Island Beefwood
- Zygia latifolia, Clausena anisata, as Horsewood

== See also ==
- Sabicu wood or Hieronyma alchorneoides, Caesalpinia spp., Horseflesh Mahogany
