= Voëlvlei Dam =

Dam in the Western Cape, South Africa

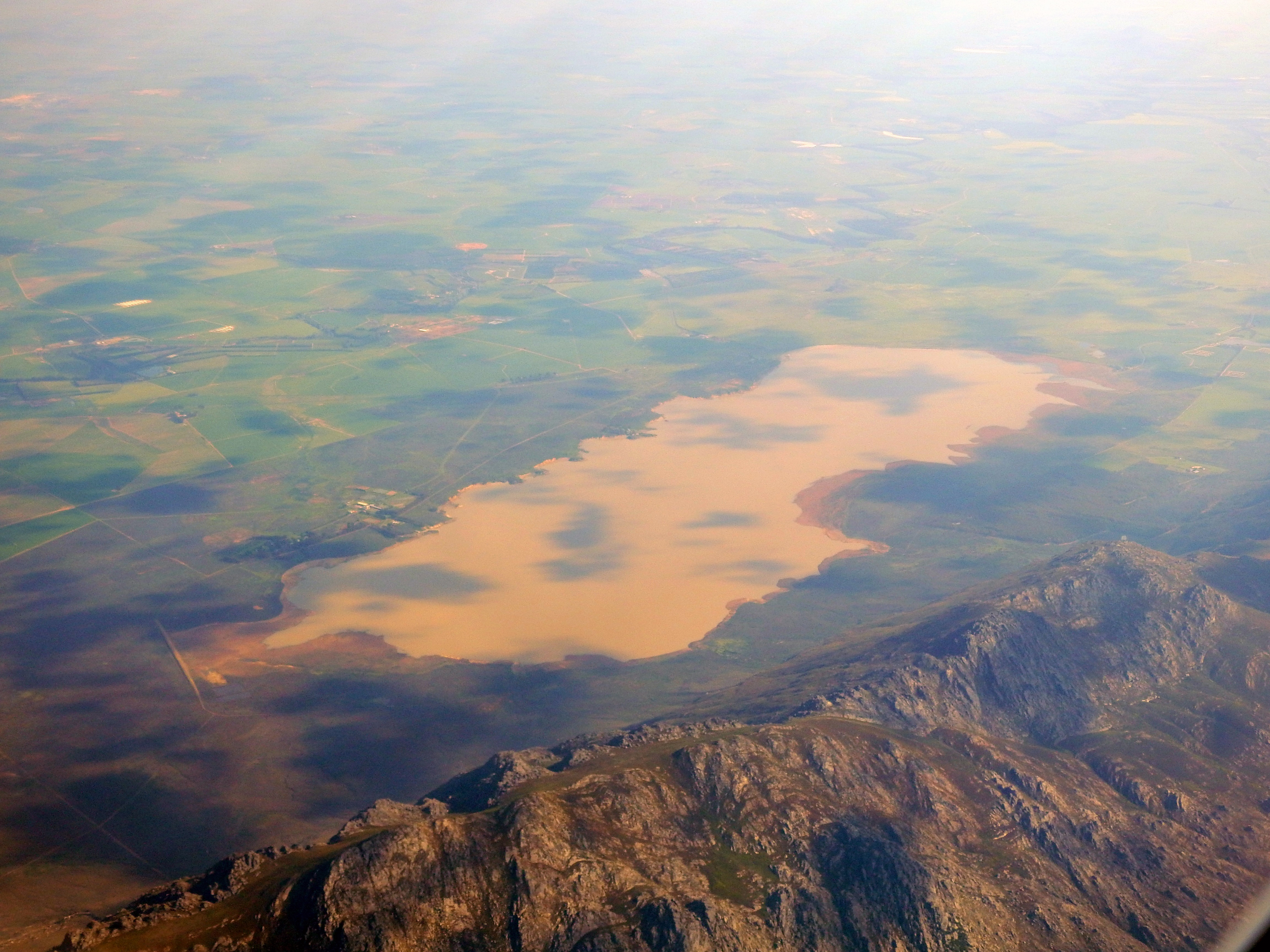
- An aerial view of Voëlvlei Dam with the Limietberg mountains in the foreground.
- Interactive map of Voëlvlei Dam
- Country: South Africa
- Location: Gouda, Western Cape
- Coordinates: 33°20′15″S 19°2′1″E
- Purpose: Water supply
- Status: Operational
- Opening date: 1952
- Owner: Department of Water and Sanitation

Dam and spillways
- Height: 10 metres (33 ft)
- Length: 2,910 metres (9,550 ft)

Reservoir
- Total capacity: 168,000 megalitres (5,900×10^{6} cu ft)
- Surface area: 1,524 hectares (3,770 acres)

Voëlvlei Dam is a dam located in the Western Cape, South Africa near the town of Gouda. The earth-fill wall is 2,910 metres (9,550 ft) long and 10 metres (33 ft) high. The reservoir covers an area of 1,524 hectares (3,770 acres) and has a capacity of 168,000 megalitres (5,900×10^{6} cu ft), making it the second-largest reservoir in the Western Cape Water Supply System. Water from the reservoir is supplied to water treatment works of the City of Cape Town and the West Coast District Municipality, and can also be released into the Berg River for agricultural purposes or to fill the Misverstand Dam.

The Voëlvlei Dam was constructed in 1952 to expand the capacity of the Voëlvlei lake, which formed in a natural depression. Because the lake had a limited catchment area, a canal was also constructed to supply water to the reservoir from a weir in the Nuwekloof Pass on the Klein Berg River. To meet increased demand for water from Cape Town, the dam wall was raised in 1969, and a second canal was constructed in 1971 to supply water from the Leeu River and Vier-en-Twintig River, which drain the Groot Winterhoek.

Map of Voëlvlei dam and the canals and rivers to which it is connected

Since 1734 the farm on which Voëlvlei Dam is situated belonged to the Walters family, who were of German descent. In 1948 the government expropriated the land and the farm for the Berg River Irrigation Scheme. The state paid compensation to the Walters family in the amount of £44,000 and the Vogelvlei Quarries (Pty) Ltd which bought the remainder of Voëlvlei in 1946 for £48,000. The Walters family did not agree to the expropriation and maintained a long-standing dispute with the then Nationalist government. After South Africa became a democratic country in 1994 the son of the former owner of Voëlvlei instituted a land claim under the Land Restitution Act.
