= Nuwekloof Pass (Western Cape) =

Mountain pass in South Africa

Coordinates: 33°19′S 19°05′E

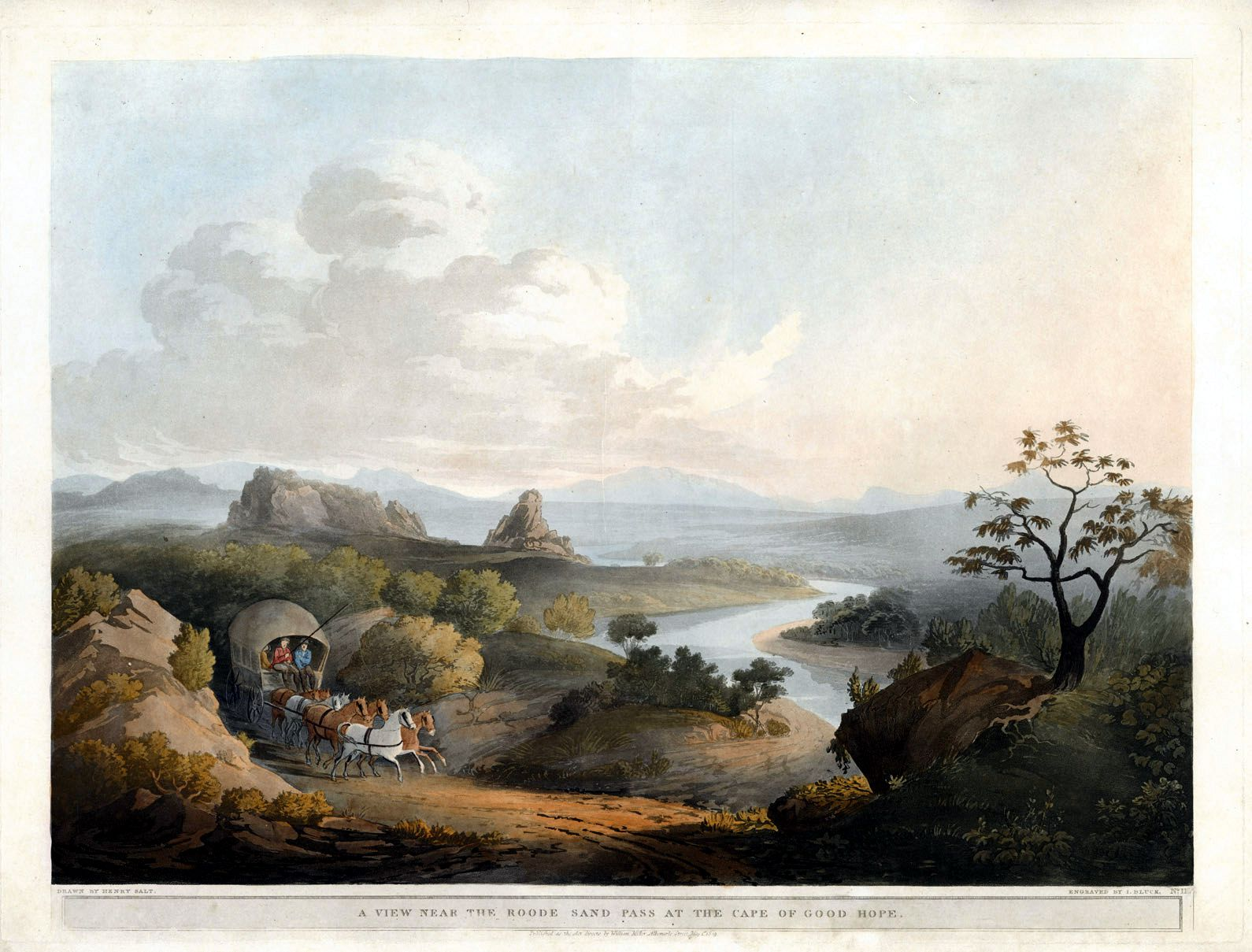
Approach to the Roodezand Pass c1809 with the Klein Berg River in the background Henry Salt

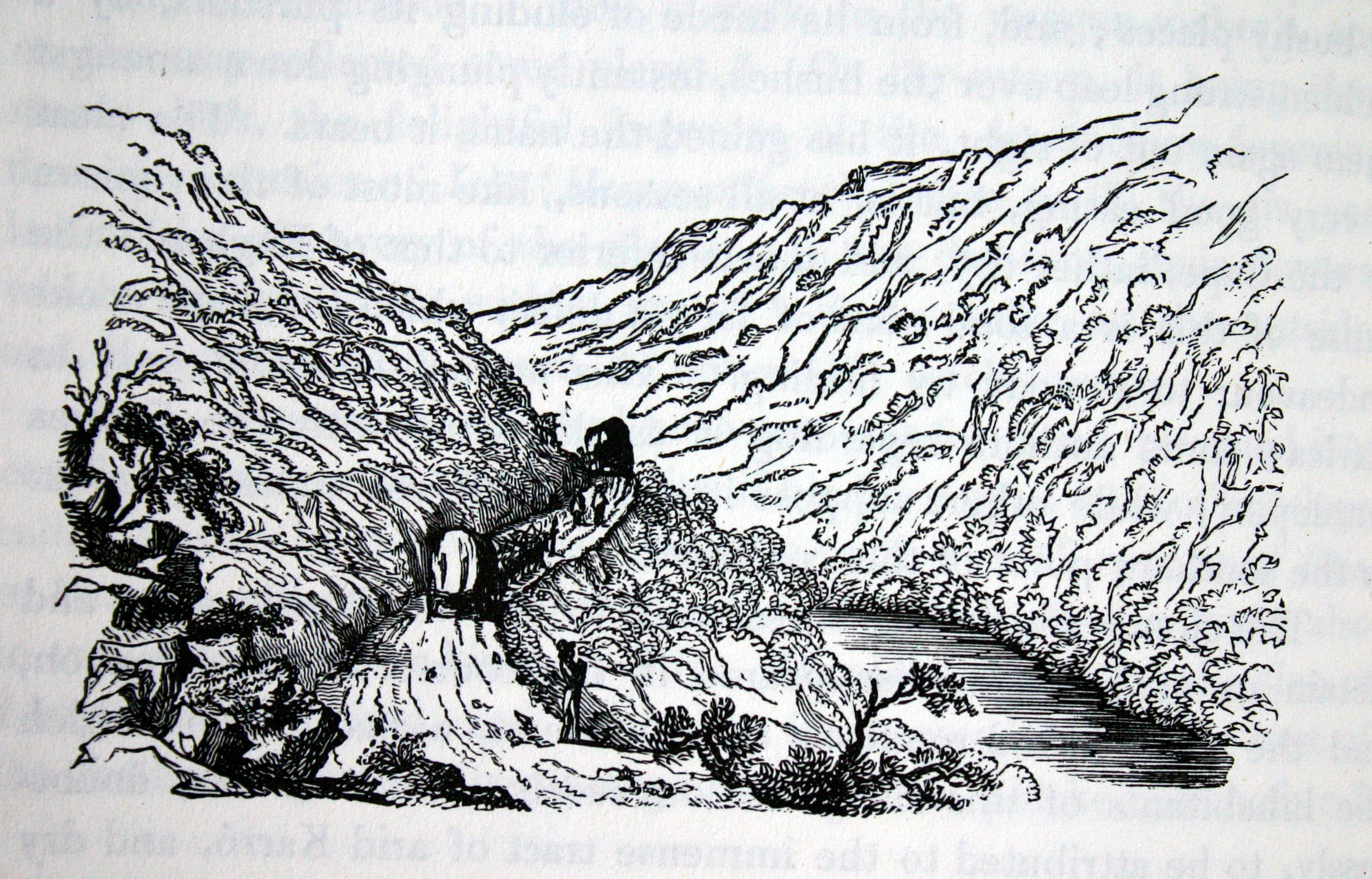
Sketch of Roodezand Pass 1811 William John Burchell

Nuwekloof Pass, also known as Roodezand Pass or Tulbagh Kloof, is a mountain pass in the Western Cape, South Africa, which crosses the Obiqua Mountains in a kloof created by the Klein Berg River. It allows eastward access from Cape Town and the Swartland into the Tulbagh basin and onwards to the Breede River Valley.

In the early days of European settlement at the Cape, only three routes permitted the passage of ox-wagons through the chain of unbroken mountains running north to south and isolating Cape Town from the interior - Gantouw Kloof in the south, Piekenierskloof Pass some 170 km north and the Roodezand Pass about midway between them.

Pieter Potter was a surveyor who had been sent in 1658 by Jan van Riebeeck to barter cattle from the Khoi herders who were known to be in that area. His party camped at the southern end of Voëlvlei from where Potter climbed to the summit of the ridge nearby, but saw no cattle or herders. Returning to the foot of the mountain, he moved north to where the Klein Berg River issued from a precipitous gorge. Potter tried to negotiate the gorge, but the sheer cliffs eventually halted his progress. Retracing his steps, he ventured further north on the west flank of the range until he found a route where he could hike to the top without much effort. From the summit he found that he had a sweeping view of the country beyond, and which had been named Roodezand Valley for the red hue of the sand and rocks at its north-western end. This way over the mountain, about 4 km north of Gouda, became known as Roodezand Pass.

For the next forty years nothing was done to improve the Pass. In 1699 Willem Adriaan van der Stel, the newly appointed Governor, decided to open the valley for farming and found it necessary to upgrade the Pass. It was particularly steep on the eastern slopes of the mountain, forcing wagons to be unloaded and dismantled, then carried piecemeal over the slopes on the backs of cattle and drivers. By the 1750s negotiating the Pass had become extremely wearying, and a concerted effort was made to find a route through the kloof which had defeated Pieter Potter almost a hundred years earlier.

Under the leadership of a certain Jacobus du Toit, the farmers of the area pushed through a route on the right bank or the eastern side of the Klein Berg River. Following the course of the river, the route had no steep gradients and soon became the preferred way to the Roodezand settlement, so that by the 1760s it too was known as the Roodezand Pass. To avoid confusion the original pass came to be called the Oude Roodezand Kloof, and the new one alongside the River duly became the Nieuwe Roodezand Kloof, names soon shortened to Oudekloof and Nieuwekloof. The easier access led to the valley's being used not only for stock farming, but also for the cultivation of vineyards, fruit and vegetables.

The Swedish botanist, Carl Thunberg, travelled through the kloof in 1772 on his way from Saldanha Bay, and noted that it was "one of the few chasms left by the long range of mountains through which it is possible for a wagon to pass" and that in some places it was too narrow for two wagons to pass each other. The intrepid naturalist, William Burchell, went through in 1811 and recorded it as

"a narrow winding defile of about three miles in length, just enough to allow a passage for the Little Berg River on each side of which the mountains rise up abrupt and lofty. Their rocky sides are thickly clothed with bushes and trees from their very summits down to the water, presenting a beautiful romantic picture adorned with their variety of foliage. Along the steep and winding sides a road has been cut, which follows the course of the river at a height above it generally between 50 and 100 feet, in one part rising much higher and in another descending to the bottom and leading through the river, which at this time (April) was not more than three feet deep, although often so swollen by the rains as to be for a day or two quite impassable. At this place, a furious stream of wind continued pouring, as it were, through this opening in the mountains, during the whole time of our stay; and it has been remarked by the boors, that this spot is always subject to strong winds. The difficulty of keeping a fire burning, or a candle alight in the waggons, obliged us to remain in the darkness till morning"

In 1805 the growing village of Roodezand was renamed 'Tulbagh' and a landdrost was stationed there. Travellers and residents took to referring to Nieuwekloof as 'Tulbagh Kloof', and the name persisted. A tollgate was installed on the road in 1807 and Theal the historian noted the tariffs as "a chaise 4 shillings, a loaded wagon 4 shillings, unloaded wagon 2 shillings, cart 2 shillings, saddle horse 1 shilling, 20 oxen or cows 4 shillings, 100 sheep 4 shillings".

At about this time Charles Michell began looking into ways by which the road through the kloof could be upgraded. The redoubtable pass builder, Thomas Bain, reconnoitred the kloof in 1855 and suggested a new route along the western side or left bank of the Klein Berg River, a recommendation which was followed in 1859 and 1860, and was to carry traffic for the next hundred years. A railway line was added to the left bank between the years 1873 and 1874. When an increase in traffic volume demanded a new route, construction returned to the right bank and a modern road was opened in 1968.

== Links ==
- Schedule of Pioneering and Construction Dates of Cape Passes
