= Klein Berg River =

River in the Western Cape, South Africa

- Location of the Klein Berg confluence with the Berg
- Native name: Klein-Bergrivier (Afrikaans)

Location
- Country: South Africa
- Province: Western Cape

Physical characteristics
- Source: Groot Winterhoek
- Mouth: Berg River
  - coordinates: 33°12.9′S 18°57′E

Basin features
- Progression: Berg→ Atlantic

The Klein Berg River (or Little Berg River; in Afrikaans Klein-Bergrivier) is a major right-hand tributary of the Berg River in the Western Cape province of South Africa. The Klein Berg drains the Tulbagh basin through the Nuwekloof into the Swartland, where it joins the Berg.

The Tulbagh basin (also known as the Land van Waveren) is bounded on the west by the Obiqua and Waterval mountains, on the north by the Groot Winterhoek range, and on the east by the Witzenberg. To the south it is divided from the Breede River Valley by a shallow watershed that passes through the town of Wolseley. The Klein Berg rises on the slopes of the Groot Winterhoek and drains the northern part of the basin, while its major tributary the Boontjies River rises from the Witzenberg and drains the southern part of the basin. These two streams converge at the eastern opening of the Nuwekloof, a narrow gorge through the Obiqua mountains. In the Nuwekloof the river is obstructed by a weir which diverts water to Voëlvlei Dam. Exiting the kloof, the Klein Berg passes by the town of Gouda before entering the Berg River near Saron.

The weir in the Nuwekloof Pass diverts up to 1.7 million cubic metres (60×10^{6} cu ft) of water per day, which in summer can amount to the entire flow of the river. The health of the river is also affected by urban wastewater discharge from Tulbagh and by agricultural runoff.

The Nuwekloof water gap created by the Klein Berg River is the only low-lying route through the mountains to the east of Cape Town, and has long been used for transport. A wagon road was built through the kloof as early as the 1750s; today it forms part of the R46 regional route. The main railway line from Cape Town to the interior was constructed through the kloof in 1875.

== See also ==
- Klein River
- Berg River
