= Disa minor =

Scientific classification
- Kingdom: Plantae
- Clade: Tracheophytes
- Clade: Angiosperms
- Clade: Monocots
- Order: Asparagales
- Family: Orchidaceae
- Subfamily: Orchidoideae
- Genus: Disa
- Species: D. minor

Binomial name
- Disa minor (Sond.) Rchb.f.

Synonyms
- Orthopenthea minor (Sond.) Rolfe; Penthea minor Sond.

Species of flowering plant

Disa minor is a perennial plant and geophyte belonging to the genus Disa and is part of the fynbos. The plant is endemic to the Western Cape and occurs at Worcester, Ceres and Tulbagh between 1000 and 2000 m above sea level, on swampy slopes. There are five subpopulations, none of which consists of more than 20 plants. The plant has no threats and is considered rare. The species was not seen for several decades until its rediscovery in 1990.
