= Berg River =

River in the Western Cape, South Africa

Berg River Bergrivier
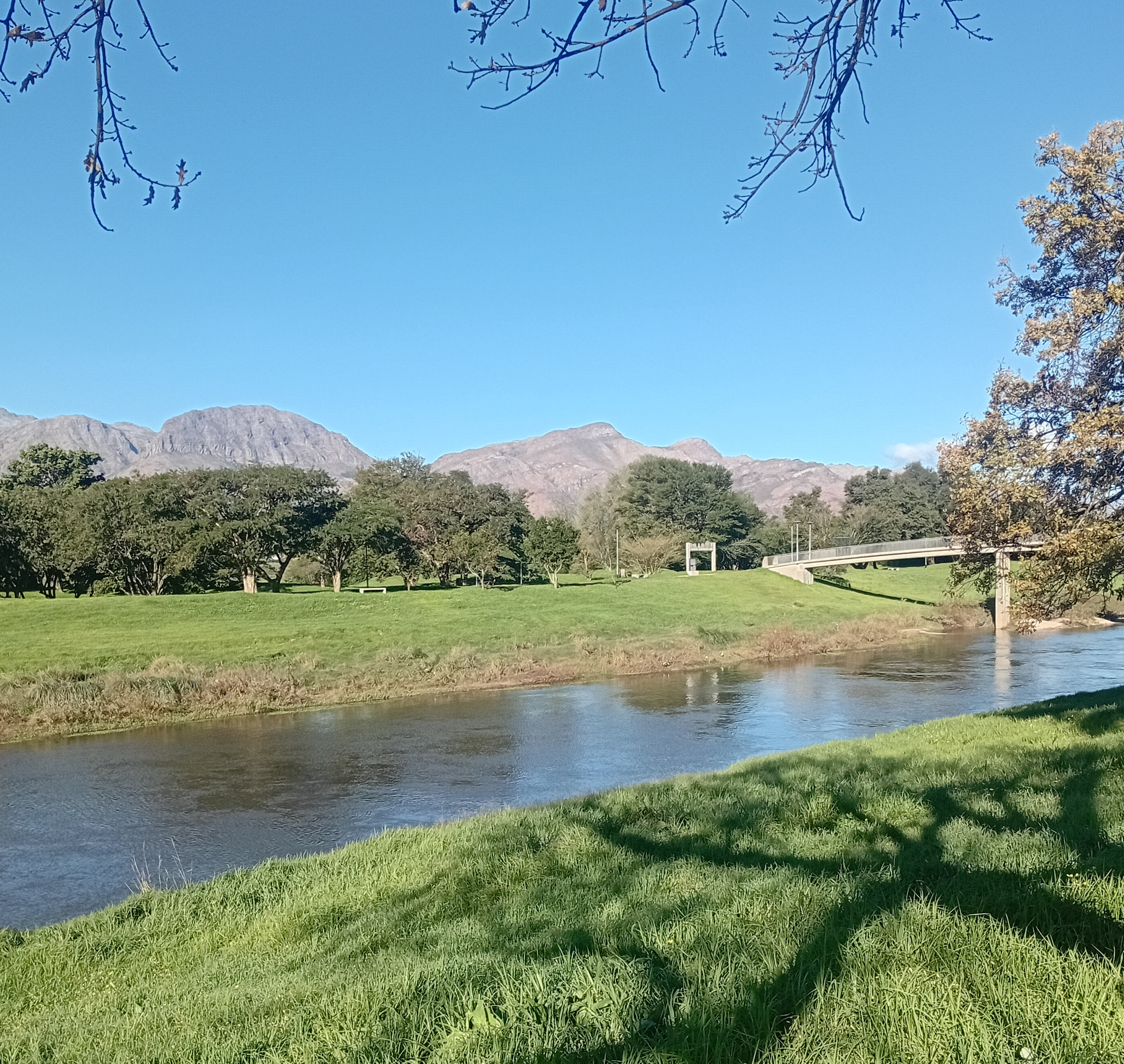
- The Berg River, as viewed from the Berg River Boulevard in Paarl, Western Cape

- Location of the Berg River mouth

Location
- Country: South Africa
- Province: Western Cape Province

Physical characteristics
- Source: South of Franschhoek
  - location: Drakenstein
  - elevation: 1,000 m (3,300 ft)
- Mouth: Atlantic Ocean
  - location: North of Saldanha Bay
  - coordinates: 32°46′S 18°09′E
  - elevation: 0 m (0 ft)
- Length: 294 km (183 mi)
- Basin size: 7,715 km^{2} (2,979 sq mi)

Basin features

Ramsar Wetland
- Designated: 7 July 1998
- Reference no.: 2466

The Berg River (also called Great Berg River or in Afrikaans: Bergrivier) is a river located just north of Cape Town in the Western Cape Province of South Africa. It is approximately 294 km (183 mi) long with a catchment area of 7,715 km^{2} (2,979 sq mi) and empties into the Atlantic Ocean. About 65% of the Berg River area is under agriculture. The major towns in the Berg River area are Velddrif and Laaiplek near the coast, and Piketberg, Hopefield, Moorreesburg and Darling further inland.

== Course ==
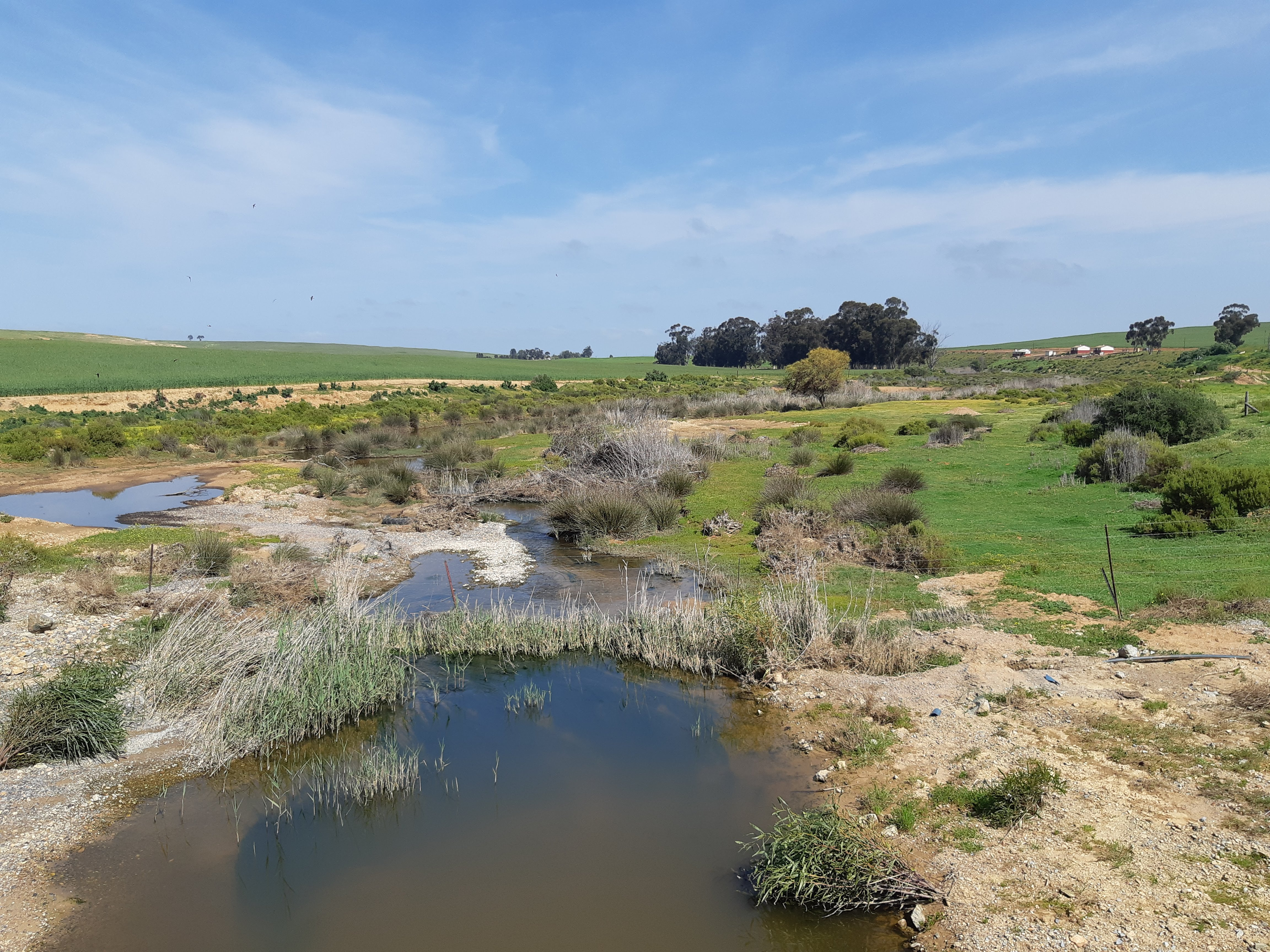
The Krom River is a sub-tributary river, via the Matjiesriver tributary, into the Berg River

The Berg River can be subdivided into the following segments:

- Upper Berg River and tributaries

It rises south of Franschhoek in the Drakenstein and Franschhoek Mountains, and flows northwestwards, being joined by the Franschhoek and Wemmershoek Rivers both from the right (NE). This section of the river contributes about a third of the flow of the Berg.

- Upper Middle Berg River and tributaries

This section begins near the settlement of Pniel, where the river turns northward just south of the N1, is joined by the Dwars River from the left (West), flows past the town of Paarl, and is joined by the Hugos River from the right (East). After the Paarl Mountains (Paardeberg) on the left, it continues north entering a broader valley with increased agricultural use, flows past the town of Wellington, and is joined by the Krom River from the right. The Hugos and Krom are normally perennial streams and drain down from the Limietberg mountains to the east. Downstream from Wellington, the Sand River and Doring River enter from the left and the last tributary in this section is the Kompagnes (Kompanjes) from the right. The Sand, Doring and Kompagnes are intermittent streams, with flow ceasing in the summer. The Sand and Doring drain down from the Kasteelberg (Kasteel Mountains) and Riebfor Forest Reserve to the west.

- Lower Middle Berg River and tributaries

The Klein Berg River which drains the Tulbagh basin, and the Vier-en-Twintig River which drains much of the Groot Winterhoek range, both enter the Berg River from the east near the town of Saron, although much of their water is now abstracted to fill Voëlvlei Dam.

- Lower Berg River and tributaries

It flows into the Atlantic Oceans near Velddrif on the south side of St Helena Bay.

== History ==
The first known European record of the Berg River was made by bailiff Abraham Gabbema in 1657 when Dutch Governor Jan van Riebeeck sent him to trade with the Khoikhoi for meat for the settlement at the Cape. Gabbema named the river the ‘Groot Berg Rivier’. In years to follow many of van Riebeeck's men relied on the river waters and followed its winding course as they ventured northwards. Despite Gabbema's visit, the Berg Catchment was not developed until Governor Simon van der Stel’s time (1679–1699), before which settlement was limited to the Peninsula. Governor van der Stel visited the area with the first free burghers, and prompted by the Berg River’s fertility and beauty, he established the first European settlements at Paarl and in the Drakenstein valley in 1687. Wellington, Franschhoek, and Tulbagh were established shortly after this as the farmlands expanded.

== Ecology ==
The 2004 government report on the river said: "Historically, the Berg River was one of many habitats in the Cape inhabited by hippos but, in the late 1600s, hunters began overexploiting the hippos for their meat and hides, resulting in a decline in their numbers. By the mid-1700s, they had declined to such an extent that governor Tulbagh introduced a fine of 1000 guilders for anyone caught killing a hippo. Despite this protection, their numbers continued to dwindle as human settlement altered and destroyed their habitat. By the early 1800s, perhaps only a dozen remained, sheltering in the region of Kersefontein and the estuary. In 1829, only six hippos remained. The last known hippo was shot in 1869 by Martin Melck when it attacked and killed one of his employees." See Skead for more details.

The Berg River's native fishes contain some species which are endemic to the region such as the Cape galaxias (Galaxias zebratus) and Berg River redfin (Pseudobarbus burgi). They have been adversely affected by unsustainable human use of the water, but mainly by expanding stocks of exotic fishes, which were originally introduced to establish a European-type fishery. Most problematic among these is the predatory Smallmouth Bass (Micropterus dolomieu). The Cape whitefish (Pseudobarbus capensis) – listed Endangered in the IUCN Red List – seems to have disappeared from the Berg River proper in recent times; this large species it survives elsewhere and may be suitable for fishery or aquaculture. The Berg River redfin (Pseudobarbus burgi) has one of its last major populations in the Berg River; its decline there seems to have stopped or at least slowed, but it too is already listed as Endangered by the IUCN. Trout are also a problem in the upper Berg river.

=== Berg Estuary Ramsar Site ===
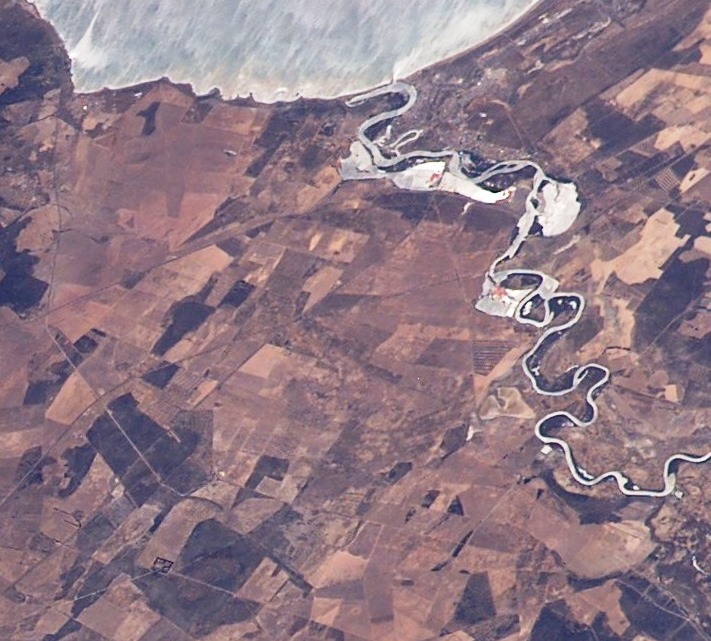
The lower Berg River seen from space. It meanders past Velddrif and Laaiplek before reaching St Helena Bay.

In 2022, the 1162.8 ha Berg Estuary Ramsar Site was designated around the Berg River. Around 127 species of waterbird have been recorded in the surrounding wetland habitat, including the threatened Cape cormorant. Threatened fish found within its waters include white steenbras and white stumpnose.

== See also ==
- Berg River Dam (not far from Franschhoek), in 33.90240°S 19.057000°E
- Berg River Canoe Marathon
- Wemmershoek Dam in the upper Berg River (north of Franschhoek)
- Nantes Dam, (west of Paarl)
- Bethel Dam, (west of Paarl), in the Upper Middle Berg River
- Voëlvlei Dam in the Lower Middle Berg River (south of Gouda)
- Misverstand Dam in the Lower Berg River.
