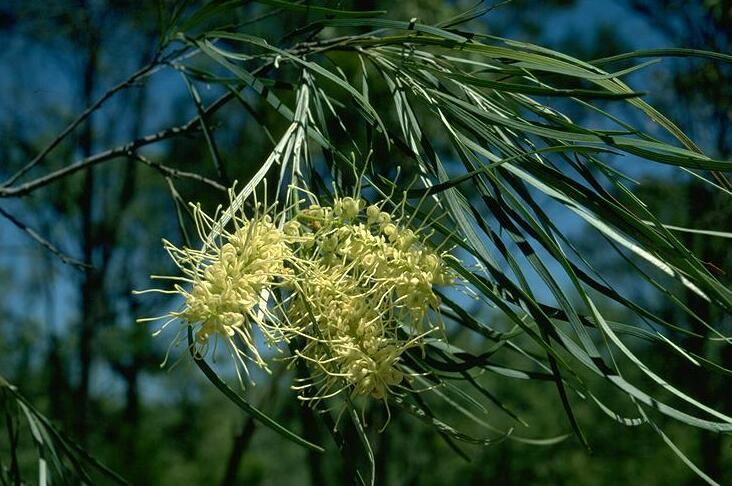

Scientific classification
- Kingdom: Plantae
- Clade: Tracheophytes
- Clade: Angiosperms
- Clade: Eudicots
- Order: Proteales
- Family: Proteaceae
- Genus: Grevillea
- Species: G. parallela

Binomial name
- Grevillea parallela Knight

Synonyms
- Grevillea angustata R.Br.; Grevillea ceratophylla R.Br.; Grevillea heteroneura W.Fitzg.; Grevillea muelleriana H.Buek; Grevillea polybotrya F.Muell. nom. illeg.; Grevillea polystachya R.Br.; Grevillea polystachya var. hebestachya Benth.; Grevillea polystachya R.Br. var. polystachya; Grevillea refracta var. ceratophylla (R.Br.) Benth.; Grevillia parallela Knight orth. var.

= Grevillea parallela =

Species of shrub endemic to northern Australia

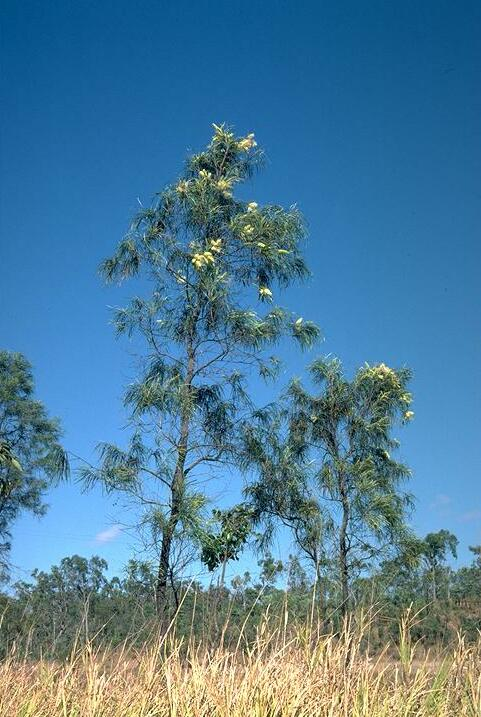
Habit near Mareeba

Grevillea parallela, also known as silver oak, beefwood or white grevillea, is a species of flowering plant in the family Proteaceae and is endemic to northern Australia. It is a single-stemmed shrub or small tree with pinnatisect or pinnatipartite leaves, the lobes linear to strap-like, and cylindrical clusters of white to cream-coloured or pale yellowish-green flowers.

== Description ==
Grevillea parallela is a single-stemmed shrub or tree that typically grows to a height of 2.5–15 m (8 ft 2 in – 49 ft 3 in) and has dark, hard, furrowed bark and pendulous foliage. Its leaves are pinnatisect or pinnatipartite, 100–400 mm (3.9–15.7 in) long, with 3 to 10 erect, linear to strap-like lobes 20–200 mm (0.79–7.87 in) long, 0.9–10 mm (0.035–0.394 in) wide and pale green-silvery grey. The flowers are usually arranged on the ends of branches in cylindrical clusters 60–100 mm (2.4–3.9 in) long, and are white to cream-coloured or pale yellowish-green, the pistil 13–26 mm (0.51–1.02 in) long. Flowering mainly occurs from June to October, and the fruit is an elliptic to lens-shaped follicle 14–29 mm (0.55–1.14 in) long.

== Taxonomy ==
Grevillea parallela was first formally described in 1809 by Joseph Knight in On the cultivation of the plants belonging to the natural order of Proteeae, from specimens collected by Sir Joseph Banks near the Endeavour River. The specific epithet (parallela) means "parallel" and refers to the leaf veins.

== Distribution and habitat ==
Silver oak is found in northern Australia, in the Kimberley region of Western Australia, the top end of the Northern Territory and northern and central areas of Queensland. It grows in a variety of soils types derived from laterite, sandstone or granite. It is usually part of an open forest or woodland ecosystem with a grassy understorey. Associated species include bloodwoods (Corymbia polycarpa, C. tessellaris and C. nesophila), other eucalypts including (Eucalyptus tetrodonta, E. miniata and E. platyphylla) and Melaleuca viridiflora and Planchonia careya.

== See also ==
- List of Grevillea species
