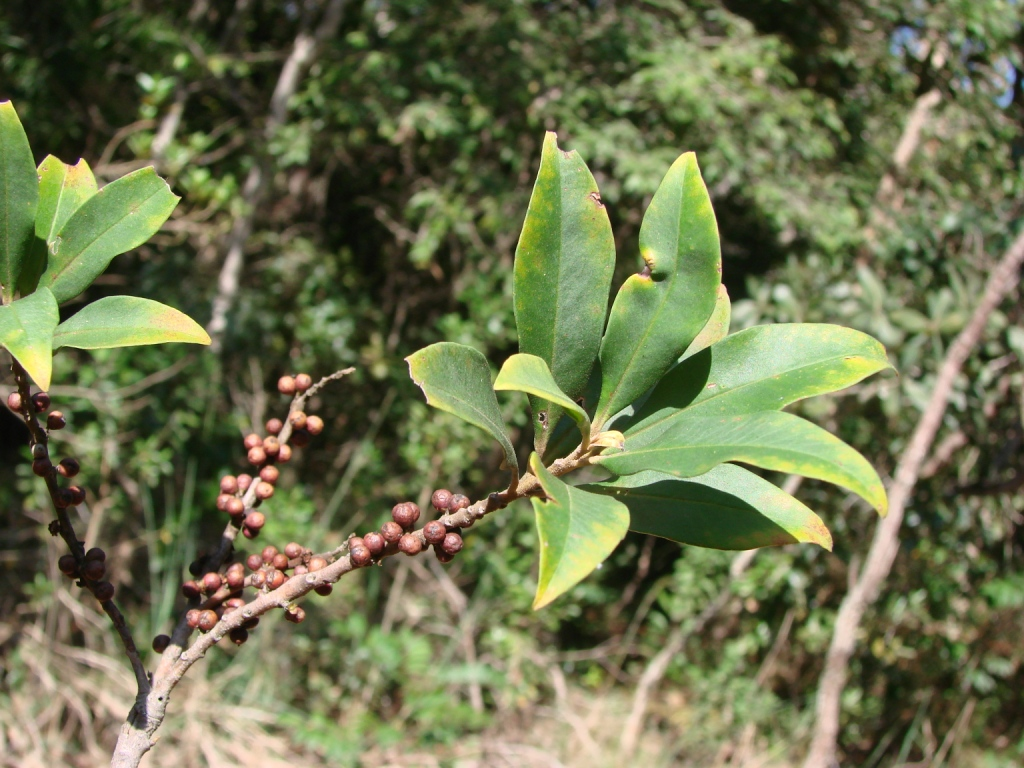

Conservation status
- Least Concern (IUCN 3.1)

Scientific classification
- Kingdom: Plantae
- Clade: Tracheophytes
- Clade: Angiosperms
- Clade: Eudicots
- Clade: Asterids
- Order: Ericales
- Family: Primulaceae
- Genus: Myrsine
- Species: M. coriacea

Binomial name
- Myrsine coriacea (Sw.) R.Br. ex Roem. & Schult.

Subspecies
- Myrsine coriacea subsp. coriacea; Myrsine coriacea subsp. nigrescens (Lundell) Ricketson & Pipoly; Myrsine coriacea subsp. reticulata (Steyerm.) Pipoly

Synonyms
- Anguillaria coriacea (Sw.) Poir.; Ardisia coriacea Sw.; Rapanea coriacea (Sw.) Mez; Samara coriacea (Sw.) Sw.; Tinus coriacea (Sw.) Kuntze

= Myrsine coriacea =

Species of flowering plant

Myrsine coriacea is a species of flowering plant in the family Primulaceae. It is a tree native to the tropical Americas, ranging from Mexico through the Caribbean, Central America, and tropical South America to northern Argentina. In Colombia it is native to the Andes, Caribbean, Pacific, and Magdalena Valley regions from 820 to 3360 meters elevation. It is used as a medicine and for food.

Three subspecies are accepted.

- Myrsine coriacea subsp. coriacea
- Myrsine coriacea subsp. nigrescens (Lundell) Ricketson & Pipoly
- Myrsine coriacea subsp. reticulata (Steyerm.) Pipoly
