= Misverstand Dam =

- Interactive map of Misverstand Dam
- Official name: Misverstand Dam
- Location: Western Cape, South Africa
- Coordinates: 33°01′44″S 18°47′36″E
- Opening date: 1977
- Operators: Department of Water Affairs and Forestry

Dam and spillways
- Type of dam: gravity & arch
- Impounds: Berg River
- Height: 23 metres (75 ft)
- Length: 26 metres (85 ft)

Reservoir
- Creates: Misverstand Dam Reservoir
- Total capacity: 7,737,000 cubic metres (273,200,000 cu ft)
- Surface area: 255 hectares (630 acres)

Misverstand Dam is a combined gravity & arch type dam located on the Berg River, near Porterville, Western Cape, South Africa. It was established in 1977 and serves mainly for municipal and industrial use. The hazard potential of the dam has been ranked significant (2).

== See also ==
- List of reservoirs and dams in South Africa
- List of rivers of South Africa
