= Swartland =

Region in Western Cape, South Africa

Coordinates: 33°22′S 18°47′E

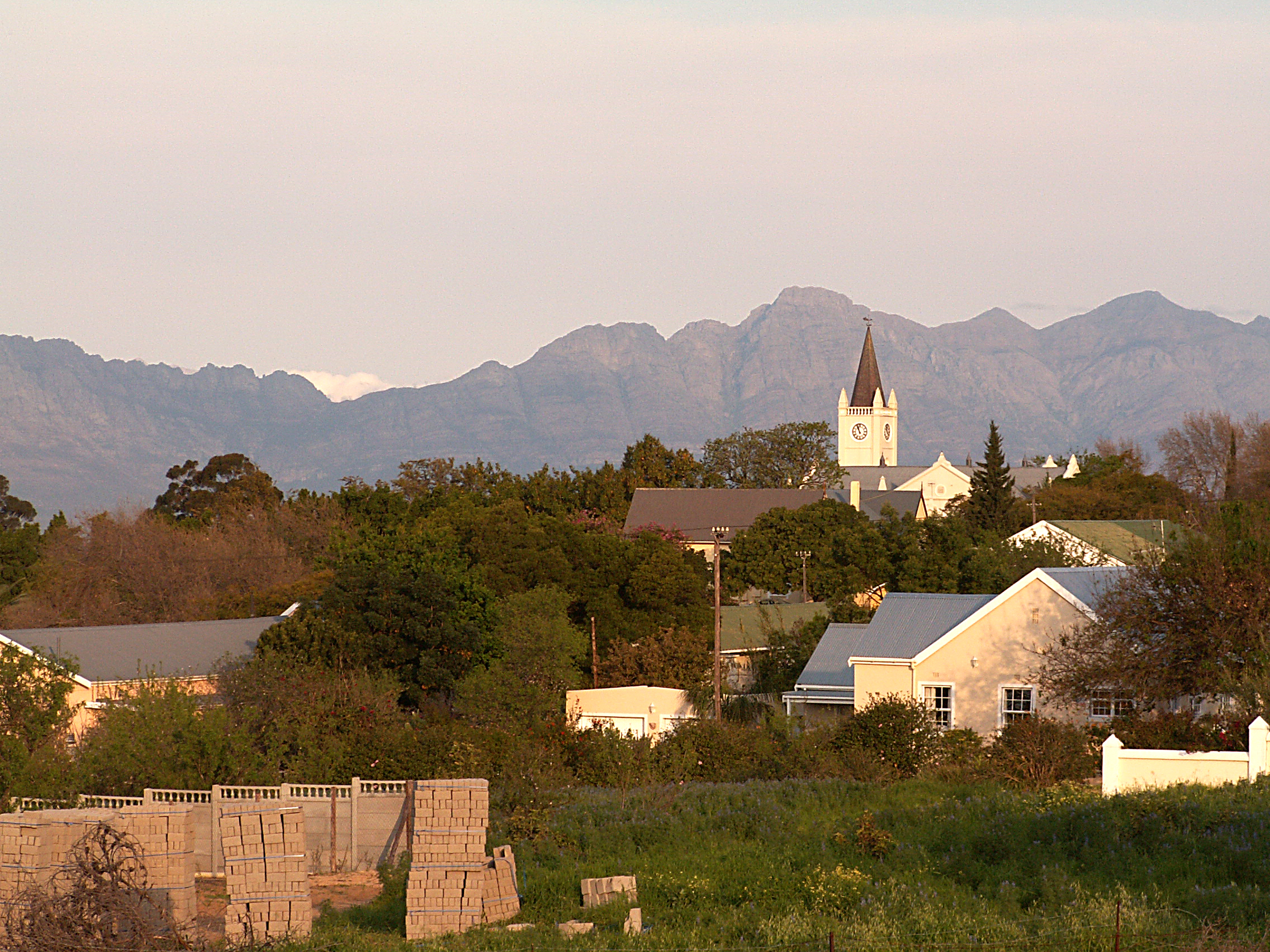
Riebeek Kasteel

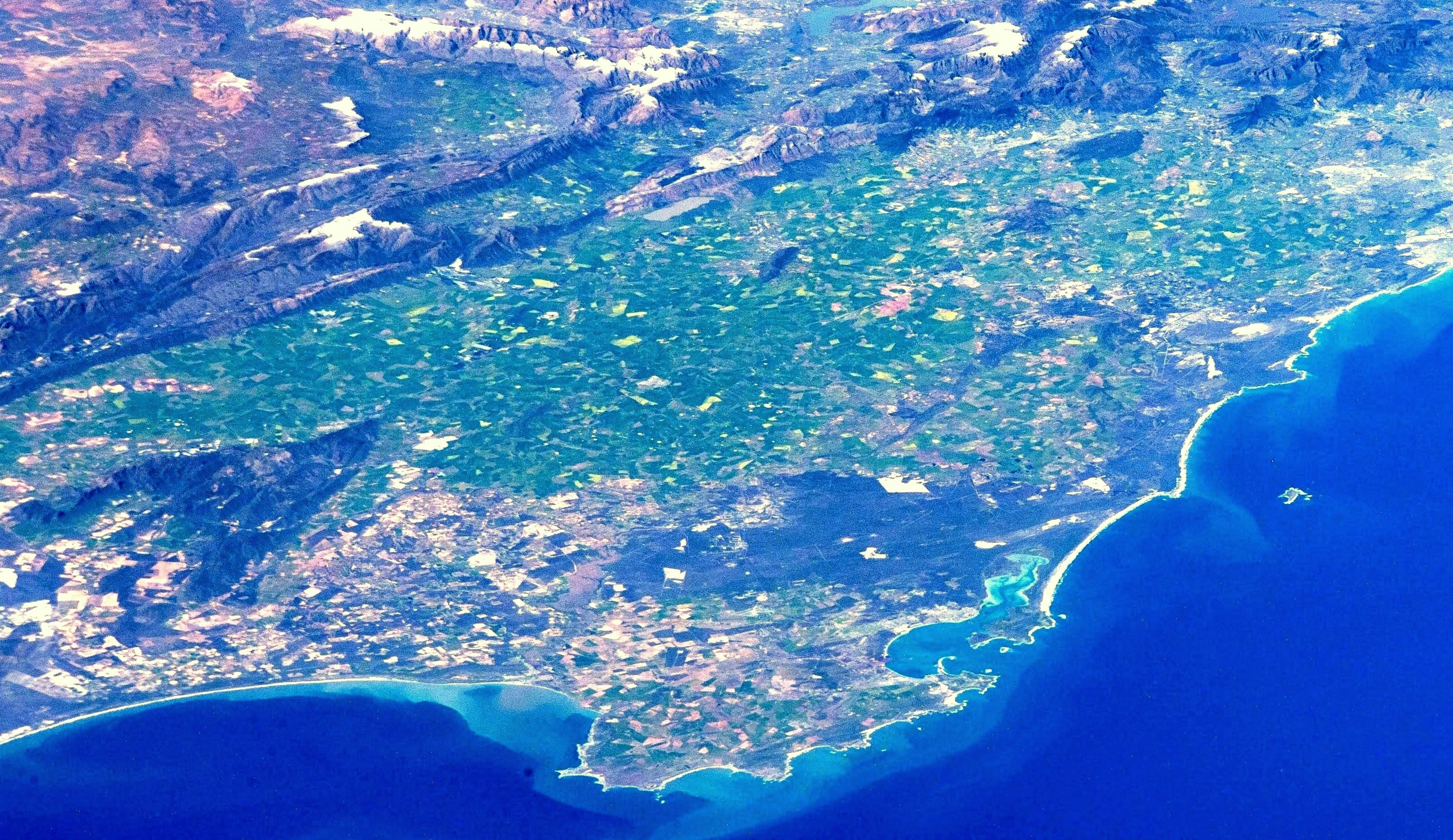
A winter view of the Swartland from space

The Swartland is a region of Western Cape Province that begins some 50 kilometres (31 mi) north of Cape Town and consists of the area between the towns of Malmesbury in the south, Darling in the west, Piketberg in the north, Moorreesburg in the middle and the Riebeek West and Riebeek Kasteel in the east. Jan van Riebeeck called this softly undulating country between the mountain ranges "Het Zwarte Land" (the Black Land) because of the endemic Renosterbos (Elytropappus rhinocerotis). After the rains, mainly in winter, the Renosterbos takes on a dark appearance when viewed from the distance in large numbers. This is due to the fine leaf-hairs adhering to the leaves when wet. The wide fertile plain is the bread basket of Cape Town with its wheat fields reaching up to the foot of the mountains, interrupted by wine, fruit, and vegetable farms. In Moorreesburg can be found only one of two museums in the world that shows the history of wheat farming.

Viticulture in the Swartland is still comparatively young but a growing number of focused producers have moved here, resulting in the region rising in popularity in the last decade to become one of the most fashionable wine areas in South Africa. Viticulture is commonly practised under dryland conditions, with minimal irrigation, which is also made possible by the large number of hectares of old vines that grow here and require less maintenance. On the Swartland Wine Route, wine farms may be visited and their products sampled, and there are regular events through the year to promote the region and its wineries.

The Swartland is home to the oldest colonial hotel of South Africa, the Royal Hotel in Riebeek Kasteel.
