= Tulbagh =

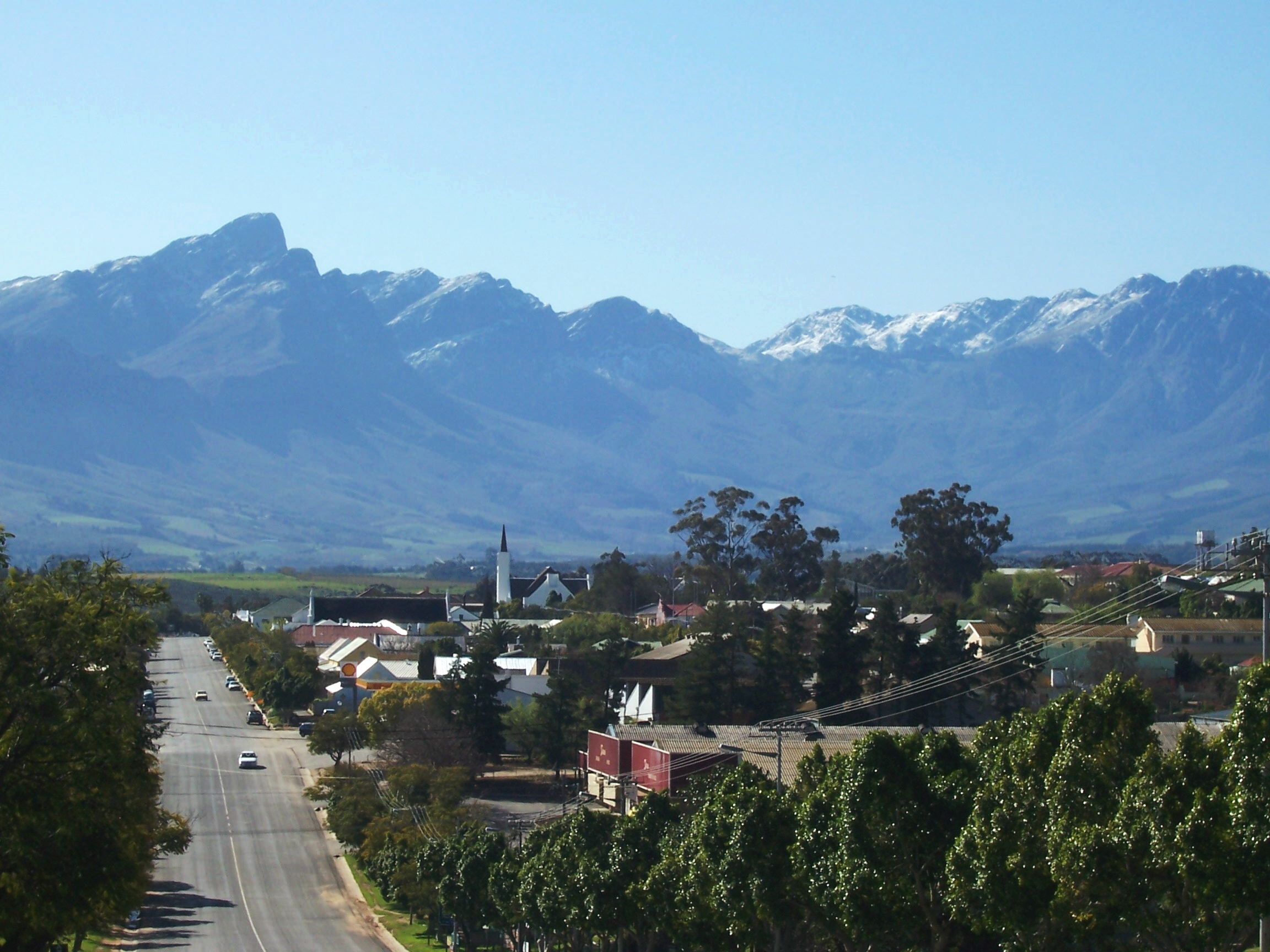
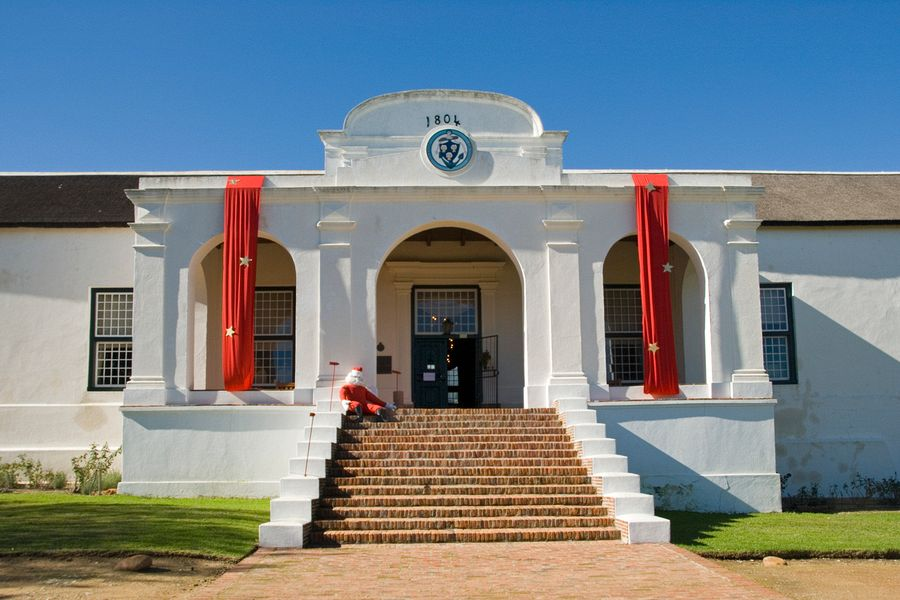
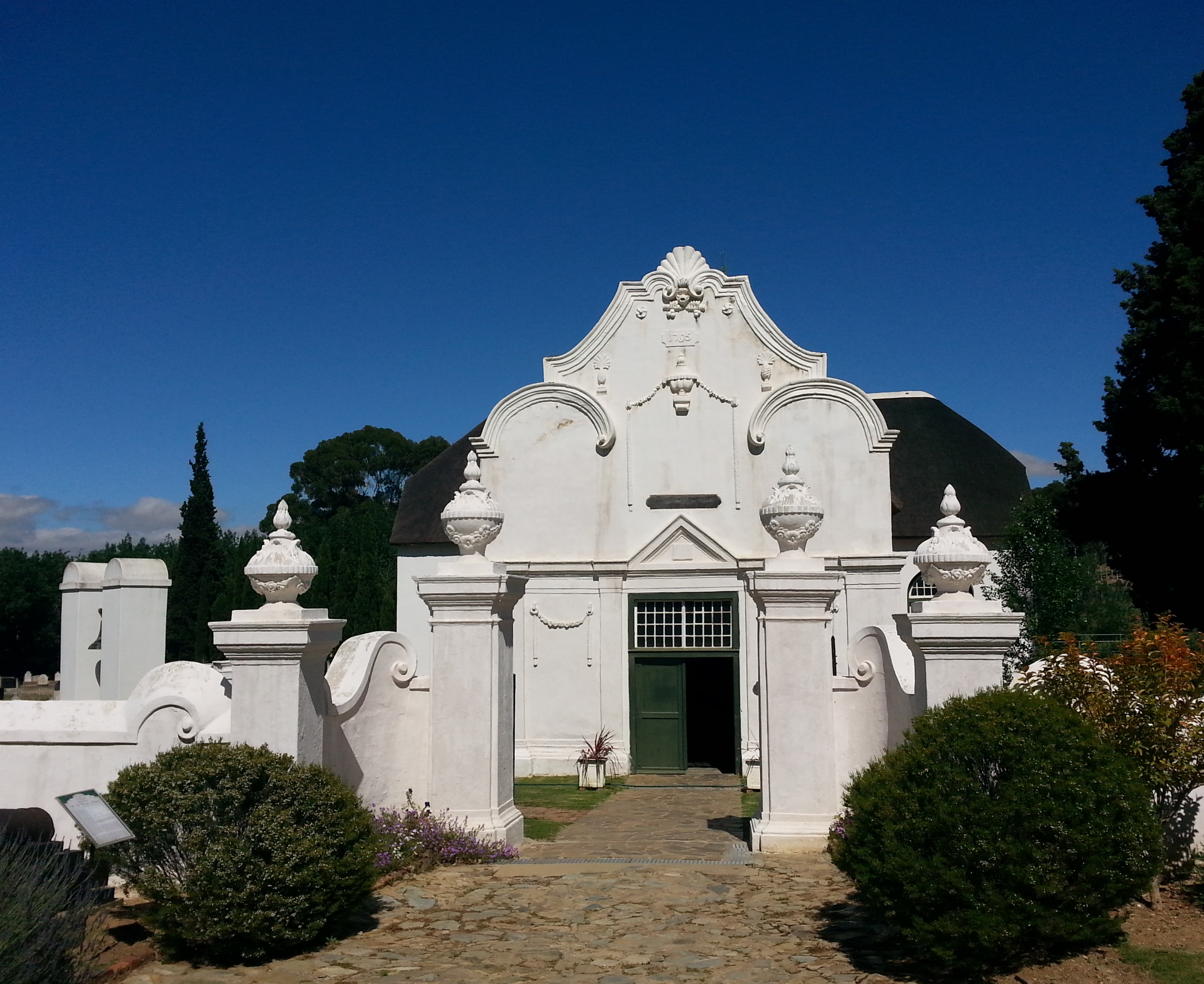
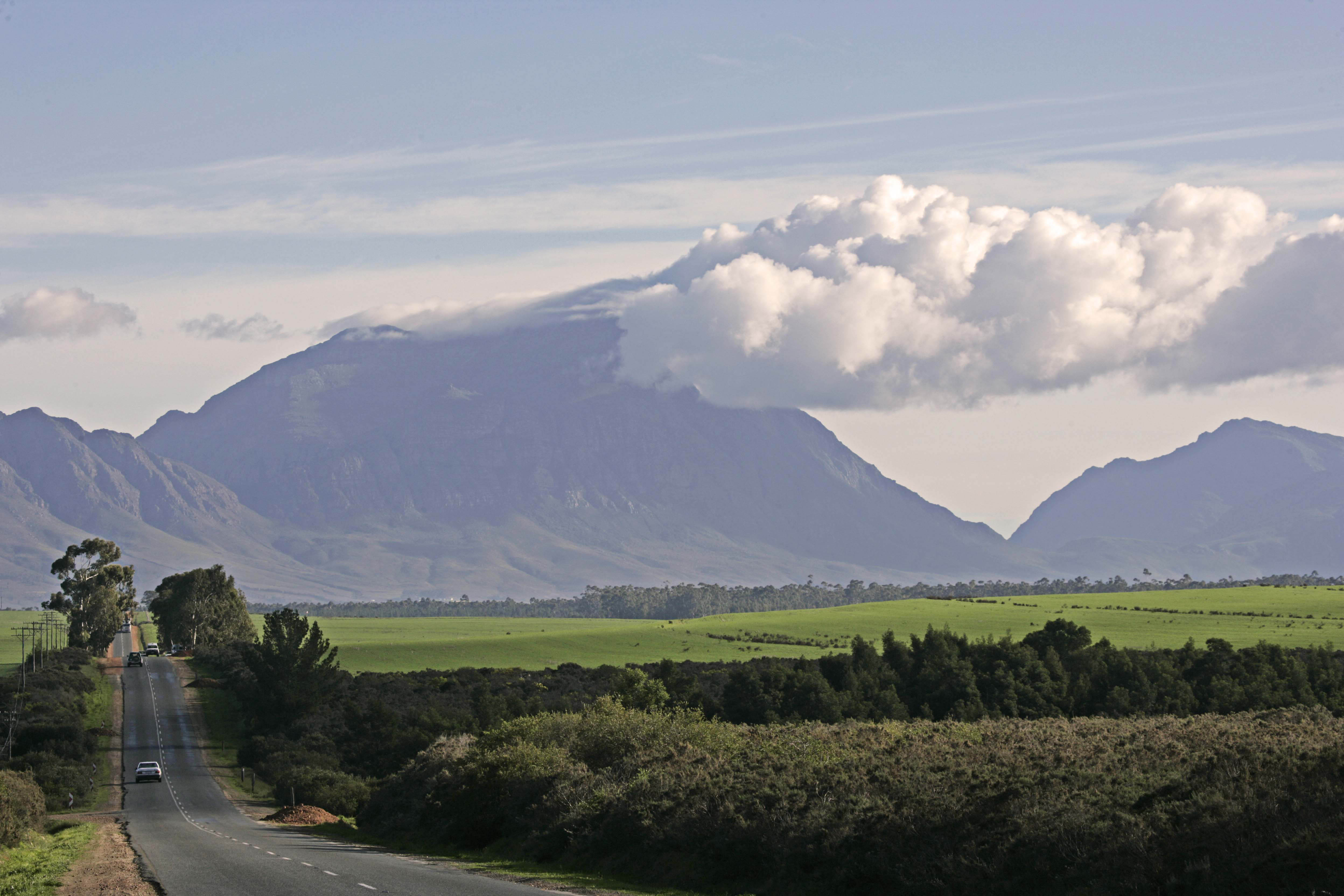
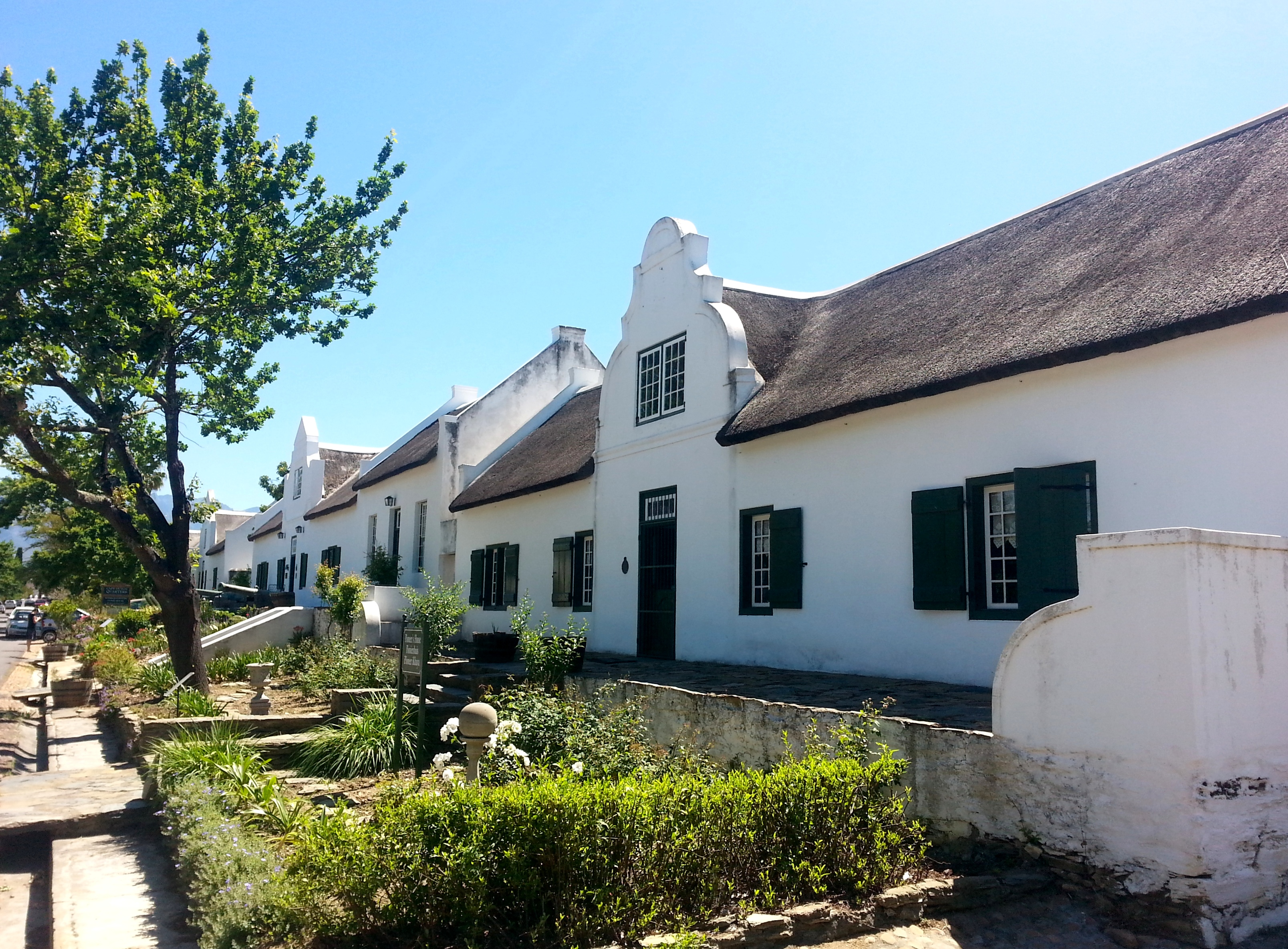
- Clockwise from Top: View over Tulbagh, Oude Kerk, Church Street, the mountains of Tulbagh, The Drostdy.

- Location within Western Cape Location within South Africa
- Coordinates: 33°17′6″S 19°8′16″E
- Country: South Africa
- Province: Western Cape
- District: Cape Winelands
- Municipality: Witzenberg
- Established: 1795
- Named for: Ryk Tulbagh

Area
  - Total: 3.81 km^{2} (1.47 sq mi)
- Elevation: 180 m (590 ft)

Population (2011)
  - Total: 8,969
  - Density: 2,350/km^{2} (6,100/sq mi)

Racial makeup (2011)
  - Black African: 22.7%
  - Coloured: 69.3%
  - Indian/Asian: 0.2%
  - White: 6.9%
  - Other: 0.8%

First languages (2011)
  - Afrikaans: 74.4%
  - Xhosa: 18.3%
  - English: 3.6%
  - Sotho: 2.0%
  - Other: 1.7%
- Time zone: UTC+2 (SAST)
- Postal code (street): 6820
- PO box: 6820
- Area code: 023

Tulbagh (Afrikaans: [ˈtœlbaχ]), previously named Roodezand, then Land van Waveren later in 1804 named after Cape of Good Hope Governor Ryk Tulbagh, is a town located in the "Land van Waveren" mountain basin (also known as the Tulbagh basin), in the Winelands of the Western Cape, South Africa. The basin is fringed on three sides by mountains, and is drained by the Klein Berg River and its tributaries. The nearest towns are Ons Rust and Gouda beyond the Nuwekloof Pass, Wolseley some 15 kilometres (9.3 mi) to the south inside the basin, and Ceres and Prince Alfred Hamlet beyond Michell's Pass in the Warm Bokkeveld.

== History ==
The basin has been inhabited for thousands of years by indigenous Khoikhoi peoples. The region was named "Land van Waveren" in 1699 by Willem Adriaan van der Stel in honour of the Oetgens van Waveren family, from which his mother was descended. Before this date, but also subsequent to it, the region had also been known as Roodezand ("red sand"). The region corresponds to the present Tulbagh district, named after Governor Ryk Tulbagh. The town developed slowly and over time and in the period many notable examples of Cape Dutch architecture, Victorian and Edwardian houses and other buildings such as the Oude Kerk (1743) and the Oude Drosdy (the original colonial Magistrate's complex) were built.

=== 1969 earthquake ===
In September 1969 the Boland area was hit by an earthquake that caused considerable damage to the town of Tulbagh. Many of the Church Street buildings were destroyed. The extent of the damage was aptly described by the Journal Bulletin of the Simon van der Stel Foundation in 1973: "A street that somehow captured the essential spirit of a unique culture looked as if it was in the throes of a nightmare: many fine gables had either tumbled or were totally destroyed, whole sections of many houses had collapsed, most of the soft brick walls had burst open in wide cracks, plaster had been torn by off in large sheets, rafters and roofs had caved in. Everything appeared to be in total and irreparable ruin."

After the disaster in Church Street, extensive projects of restoration began with the National Committee for the Restoration of Historic Buildings in Tulbagh and its Environment. Because of this work Tulbagh now contains possibly the largest number of Cape-Dutch, Edwardian and Victorian provincial heritage sites in one street in South Africa, and remains a major tourist attraction of the town to the present day. The work started by the committee has been continued to the present day by various residents of Tulbagh, but also significantly by the Tulbagh Valley Heritage Foundation, which aims to restore and maintain "all structures older than 60 years, the cultural landscape and undeveloped properties connected to the historical structures above".

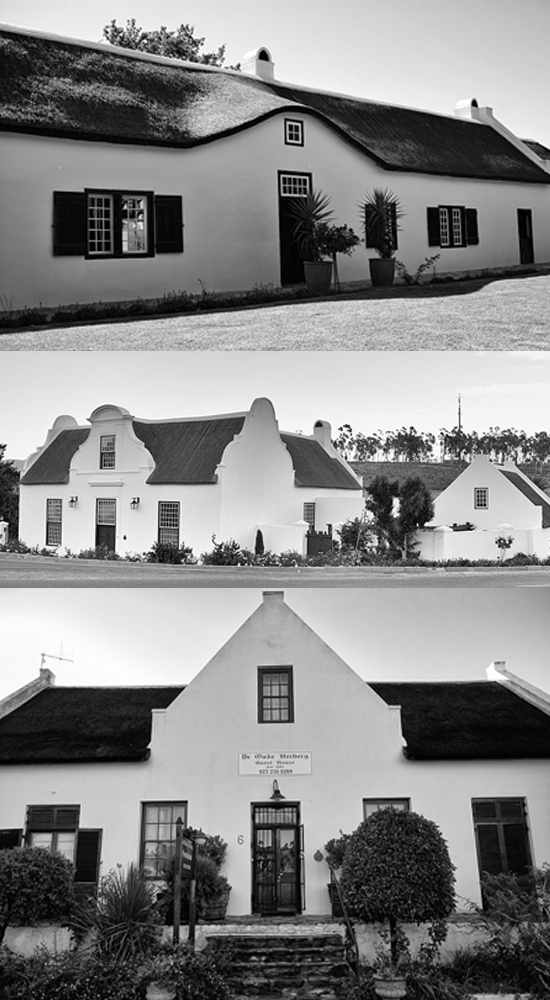
Church Street, Tulbagh, restored houses

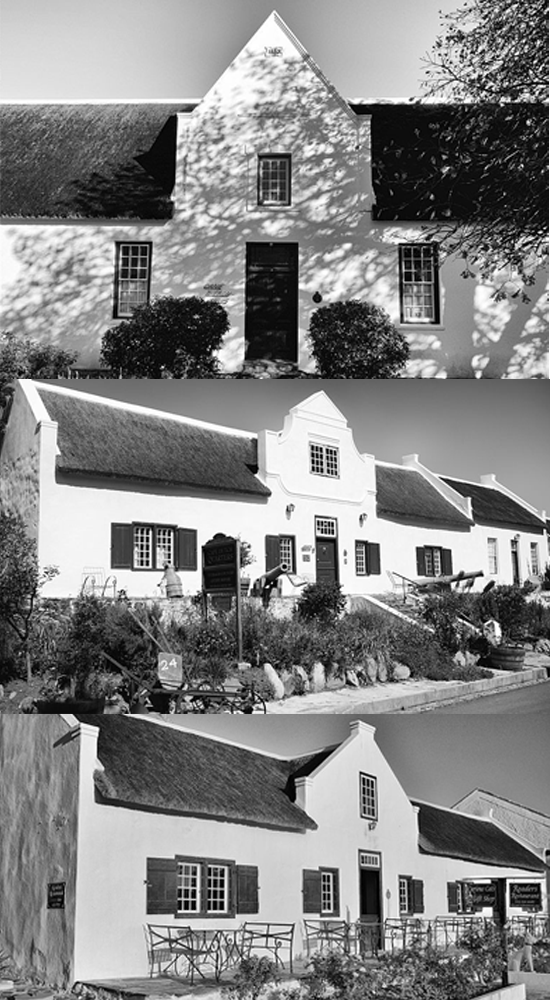
Church Street, Tulbagh, some more restored houses

== Geography ==
The bowl is surrounded by the Obiqua Mountains to the west, Groot Winterhoek Mountain to the north and the Witzenberg Mountains to the east, with peaks that rise to over 1,500 metres (4,900 ft). The basin experiences a type of Mediterranean climate. The southern side is open to cooling south-east winds during the hot summer months. Accordingly, Tulbagh enjoys some of the most diverse and attractive conditions for viticulture in the Cape, and the differences in terroir available to wine makers allow for a wide diversity of distinctive wines.

The Groot Winterhoek Mountains are part of the Cape Fold Belt. They rise to a maximum height of 2,077 metres (6,814 ft) just north of the town of Tulbagh as Groot Winterhoek peak. The Groot Winterhoek Wilderness Area, operated by CapeNature, comprises a conservation area of 30,608 ha.

=== Flora and Fauna ===
Many animals, such as baboons, bat-eared foxes, lynxes, and smaller species of antelope, live in parts of the valley, and it is known that leopards still occur in the mountains. Baboons are a common sight on the pass. The Witzenberg Valley is home to a wide variety of birds, including the Cape sugarbird and Verreaux's eagle.

The most conspicuous components of the flora are evergreen sclerophyllous plants, many with ericoid leaves and gracile habit, as opposed to timber forest. Several plant families are conspicuous in fynbos; the Proteaceae are prominent, with genera such as Protea, Leucospermum (the "pincushions"), and Leucadendron (the silver tree and "cone bushes"). Proteas are represented by many species and are prominent in the landscape, generally with large striking flowers, many of which are pollinated by birds, and others by small mammals.

== Tulbagh today ==
=== Events ===
Tulbagh hosts various events every year. In June, the village Christmas in Winter; in September the Tulbagh Spring Arts Festival showcases a variety of visual and performing arts; and the annual Tulbagh Horse & Wildflower Show. Tulbagh has also previously hosted the Absa Cape Epic mountain bike stage race.

=== Wine production ===
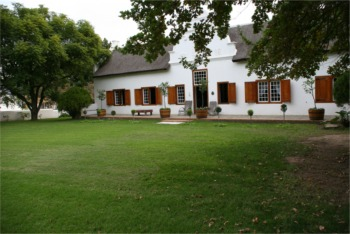
The historic vineyard Montpellier near Tulbagh

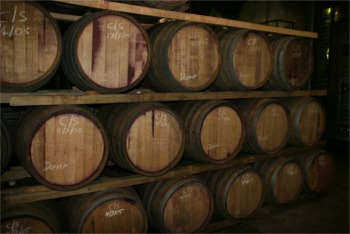
Red wine maturing in oak barrels

Wine has been produced for many years in the basin on a commercial scale, but only recently have large advances been made. There are now numerous wine estates in and around the town. The importance of this industry for the vicinity is substantial, so much so that many of the producers are now part of the Tulbagh Wine Route and this is attracting increasing numbers of tourists to Tulbagh who are eager to sample the wines produced by the members. Many new vineyards have been planted and more private cellars are either being planned or built to cope with the expected production volumes of quality wines.

Tulbagh also has 3 nearby schools: one named Laerskool Waveren (Waveren Primary School), another named Tulbagh Hoër (Tulbagh High), and Rijk Tulbagh Privaat Skool (Rijk Tulbagh Private School).

== See also ==
- List of heritage sites in Tulbagh
- Louis Michel Thibault

== Further information ==
- "Home". Tulbagh: Valley of abundance.
- "Home". Tulbagh Museum.
