= R304 (South Africa) =

Regional route in South Africa

Regional route R304
- R304 route map

Route information
- Length: 65 km (40 mi)

Major junctions
- North end: R307 near Atlantis
- N7 near Philadelphia; R302 at Klipheuwel; R312 near Klipheuwel; N1 exit 39 near Kraaifontein; R101 near Kraaifontein
- South end: R44 / R310 in Stellenbosch

Location
- Country: South Africa
- Towns: Atlantis, Klipheuwel, Stellenbosch

Highway system
- Numbered routes of South Africa
← R303	→ R305

The R304 is a Regional Route in South Africa connecting Stellenbosch with Atlantis.

== Route ==
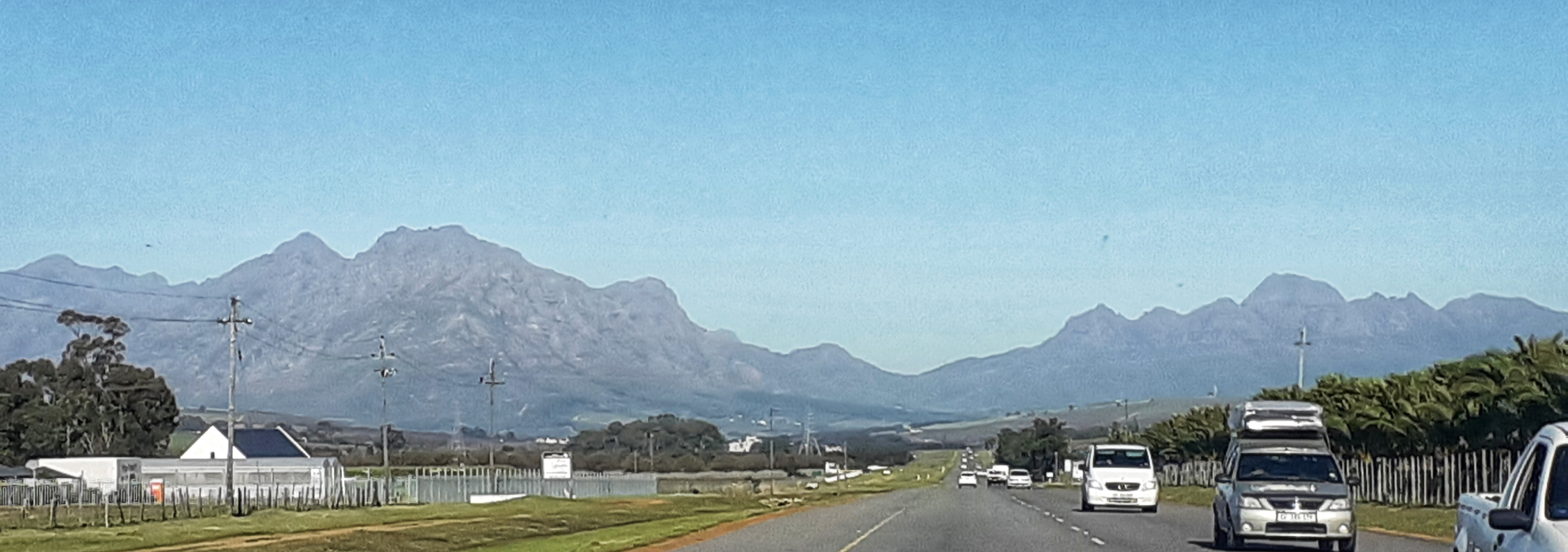
The R304 between the village of Koelenhof and the N1 en-route to Stellenbosch

Its north-western origin is a junction with the R307 (Dassenberg Drive) adjacent to Mamre Nature Garden north of Atlantis (south of Mamre). It heads south-south-east as Charel Uys Drive to enter the centre of Atlantis, where it becomes Reygersdal Avenue towards the east-southeast before bending south. After 10 kilometres, the R304 reaches a T-junction, where the road southwards becomes Old Mamre Road, and the R304 turns to the east via a left turn to cross the N7 highway and enter the village of Philadelphia.

From Philadelphia, the R304 continues east to reach Klipheuwel and meet the R302 (Klipheuwel Road), with which it is co-signed for one kilometre, heading north. After leaving the R302, the route heads southeast, crossing the R312 east of the Cape Winelands Airport before crossing the N1 highway. It then meets the R101 at a staggered junction east of Kraaifontein. The route proceeds south-south-east as Koelenhof Road, then Bird Street, to pass in-between Kayamandi and Cloetesville before reaching its end at a junction with the R44 and the R310 in the Stellenbosch town centre.

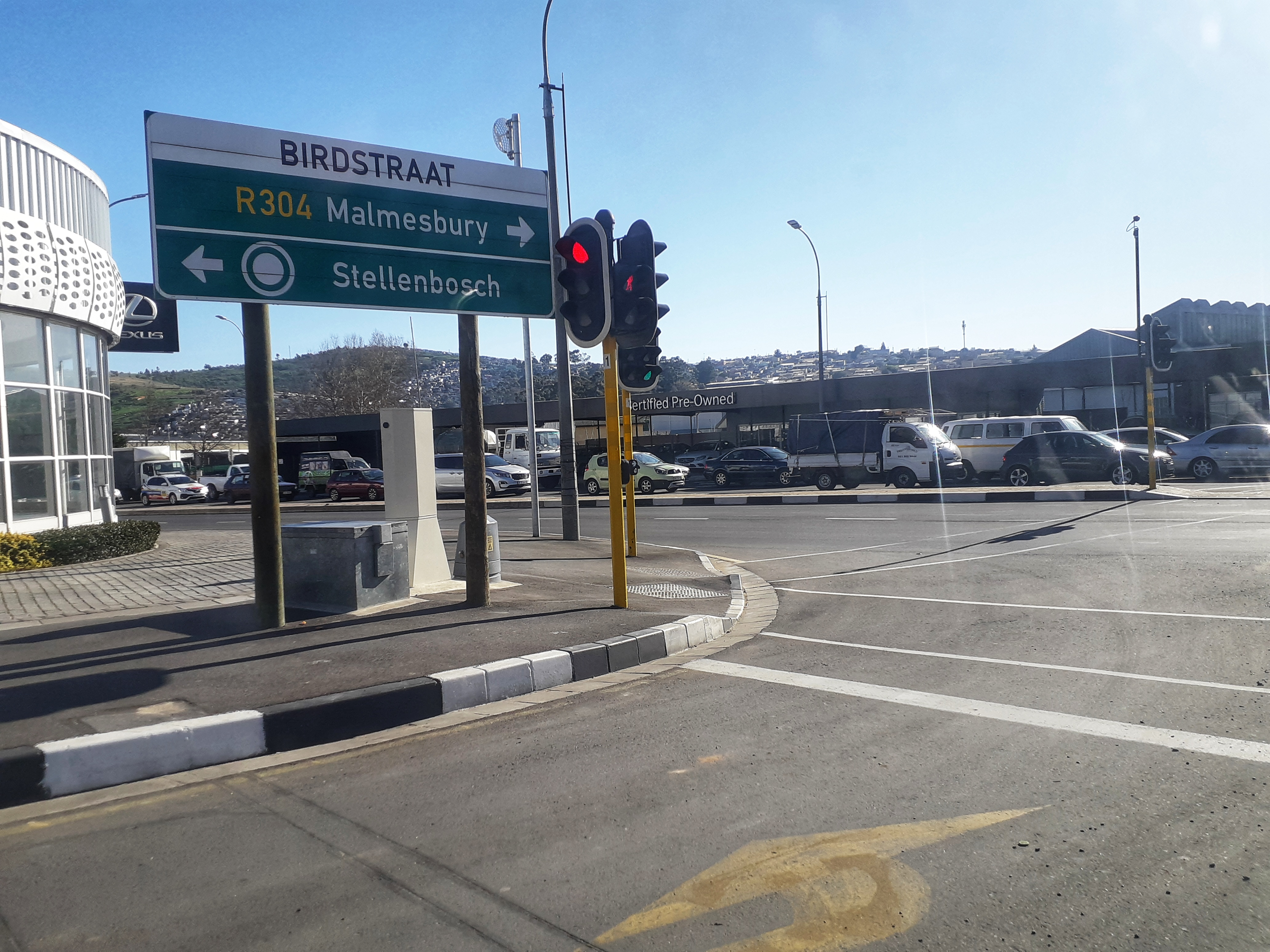
Road sign at Bird Street, Stellenbosch Central
