= Ryk van Schoor =

South African rugby union player

- Born: Ryk Arnoldus Mauritius van Schoor; 3 December 1921 Philadelphia, South Africa
- Died: 22 March 2009 (aged 87) Parow, South Africa
- Height: 1.75 m (5 ft 9 in)
- Weight: 77 kg (12 st 2 lb)
- School: Paarl Boys' High School
- Occupation: Tobacco farmer

Rugby union career
- Position: Centre
–	Inyazura RFC		
Provincial / State sides
Years	Team	Apps	(Points)
1942–1948	Western Province		
1949–1952	Rhodesia		
1953	Western Province		
International career
Years	Team	Apps	(Points)
1949–1953	South Africa	12	(6)

Ryk Arnoldus Mauritius van Schoor (3 December 1921 – 22 March 2009) was a South African rugby union centre, a crash ball specialist he was known for his hard tackling. Van Schoor played club rugby for Inyazura RFC and provincial rugby for both Western Province and Rhodesia. He was capped for South Africa twelve times between 1949 and 1953 first representing the team against the 1949 touring New Zealand side. He was later selected for the 1951–52 South Africa rugby tour of Great Britain, Ireland and France. The touring team is seen as one of the greatest South African teams, winning 30 of the 31 matches, including all five internationals.

== Personal history ==
Van Schoor was born in Philadelphia, Western Cape in 1921 to Dirk and Catharina van Schoor. He was educated at the primary school in Klipheuwel then at Paarl Boys' High where he played hockey for Boland. After leaving school he took a post as a clerk in Cape Town, but left his employment in 1948 when he moved to Rhodesia to seek his fortune as a tobacco farmer. He married Leonie Krüger, who was the daughter of former international South Africa hooker Theuns Krüger. They had three children, but Leonie died before van Schoor and he was a widower for many years. He died at a nursing home in Parow in 2009 following an illness.

== Rugby career ==
Van Schoor first played rugby at the age of seven, but when he entered Paarl Boys' School he was considered too small to play. As an adult he was 5-foot 9 inches in height, but was broad of shoulder and developed into one of the most feared tacklers in South Africa. Van Schoor was also a crash ball specialist, a factor that is believed to have brought him to the notice of the South Africa selectors and won him his first cap. he was first selected to play rugby at provincial level in 1942 for Westen Province, during which time he was playing club rugby for Gardens. After moving to Rhodesia in 1948 he switched clubs to Inyazura, and was dropped by Western Province, turning out instead for Rhodesia.

=== 1949 New Zealand tour of South Africa ===
In 1949, the New Zealand 'All Blacks' toured South Africa, the first team to do so since the Second World War. Trials to face the tourist were held, but van Schoor wasn't amongst the 120 players who turned out. The first Test was played on 16 July at Cape Town, South Africa won 15–11. The All Blacks then travelled north to Rhodesia to play the Rhodesian team in two matches. Two South African selectors, Danie Craven and Bert Kipling, watched the games which ended in a 10–-8 win for Rhodesia in the first game and a 3–3 draw in the second. Van Schoor's tackling so impressed the selectors that he, and fellow Rhodesia team-mate Salty du Rand, was chosen for the second Test at Johannesburg. The game ended in a 12–6 win for South Africa. This was the first of twelve consecutive international matches the van Schoor played in. He faced New Zealand twice more in the tour, both wins, 9–3 at Durban and 11–8 at Port Elizabeth.

...Ryk, who was played purely for his amazing defensive qualities and who, in association with Hennie Muller, tore our midfield attack to shreds. If you saw a cloud of dust rising from midfield like an atom-bomb cloud, you knew Van Schoor was at work. He was big and strong and nerveless. He was not really fast but he got such a kick out of making the perfect tackle that he used to clap on all speed just before going into his dive – and boy, was it a powerful dive.

— New Zealand rugby player Bob Scott describing van Schoor in his 1956 autobiography The Bob Scott Story

=== 1951 tour of Britain ===
In 1951 South Africa undertook their fourth tour of Great Britain, also taking in games in Ireland and France. Van Schoor was one of four centres selected for the tour which took in 31 matches, including five internationals. Van Schoor played in 16 matches scoring seven tries. He was chosen for the first game of the tour, against South-Eastern Counties at Bournemouth on 19 October. South Africa won the game 31–6, van Schoor scored one of the seven Springbok tries. He was then rested for two games before playing in the win over Cardiff in Wales. After missing the game against Llanelli, van Schoor played in two back-to-back games, a win over North-Western Counties on 27 October and then an encounter with a combined Glasgow and Edinburgh team in Scotland. South Africa won the game 43–11, with van Schoor scoring another try, but he also suffered a broken rib which saw him withdraw from the squad for the next four matches. He returned for the win over Oxford University and kept his place for the match against a joint Neath/Aberavon side. On 24 November, South Africa faced their first international opponents of the tour, Scotland. Van Schoor was selected for the match, his fourth international cap, and scored his first international points with a try in a 44–0 win over Scotland. Rested against North of Scotland, van Schoor was back on the scoresheet in a win over Ulster. He was then chosen to face Ireland. After just six minutes van Schoor was carried from the pitch unconscious, coming around some time later in the dressing room. The three doctors present advised him not to return to the game, but van Schoor ignored them return to the pitch in the seventh minute of the second half. At that point South Africa were 7–5 up, and were weak in the line-out. With van Schoor's return, the team improved and won the match 17–5, van Schoor scoring a fine individualist try of which he hardly remembered.

Van Schoor was left out of the squad for the two matches before being selected for the third international, against Wales. South Africa won 6–3. He was then rested for another two games, before being brought into the squad on 5 January 1952 to face England. It was van Schoor's seventh consecutive international and his seventh consecutive win after the Springboks beat England 8–3. Van Schoor played in three of the five final matches in Britain, all wins, against Newport, Midland Counties and the Barbarians, scoring a try in the Newport game. The tour then moved to France, van Schoor playing in two of the final games of the tour. He scored a try in the win over a France 'B' team, and then was part of the Springboks squad that beat France 25–3 in the final match of the tour.

=== 1953 Australia tour of South Africa ===
Van Schoor played in all four Tests against the touring Australia team of 1953. The first game, played at Johannesburg saw South Africa win 25–3. The next Test, played on 5 September, saw van Schoor part of a losing international side for the first, and only, time. South Africa were beaten at Cape Town by a narrow 14–18 scoreline. The loss was blamed on the Springboks desire to please the crowd by switching away from their normal kicking game, to one based on running with the ball. Van Schoor survived a cull by the selectors to retain his place for the third Test, this time played at Durban. South Africa won 18–8, needing a draw to take the series in the last game at Port Elizabeth. This was van Schoor's final international, and he finished with a victory, leaving him with a career record of 11 wins out of 12 international matches.

== Bibliography ==
- Billot, John (1974). Springboks in Wales. Ferndale: Ron Jones Publications.
- Griffiths, John (1987). The Phoenix Book of International Rugby Records. London: Phoenix House. ISBN 0-460-07003-7.
- Parker, A.C. (1970). The Springboks, 1891–1970. London: Cassell & Company Ltd. ISBN 0-304-93591-3.
- Stent, R.K. (1952). The Fourth Springboks 1951–1952. London: Longmans, Green and Co.
