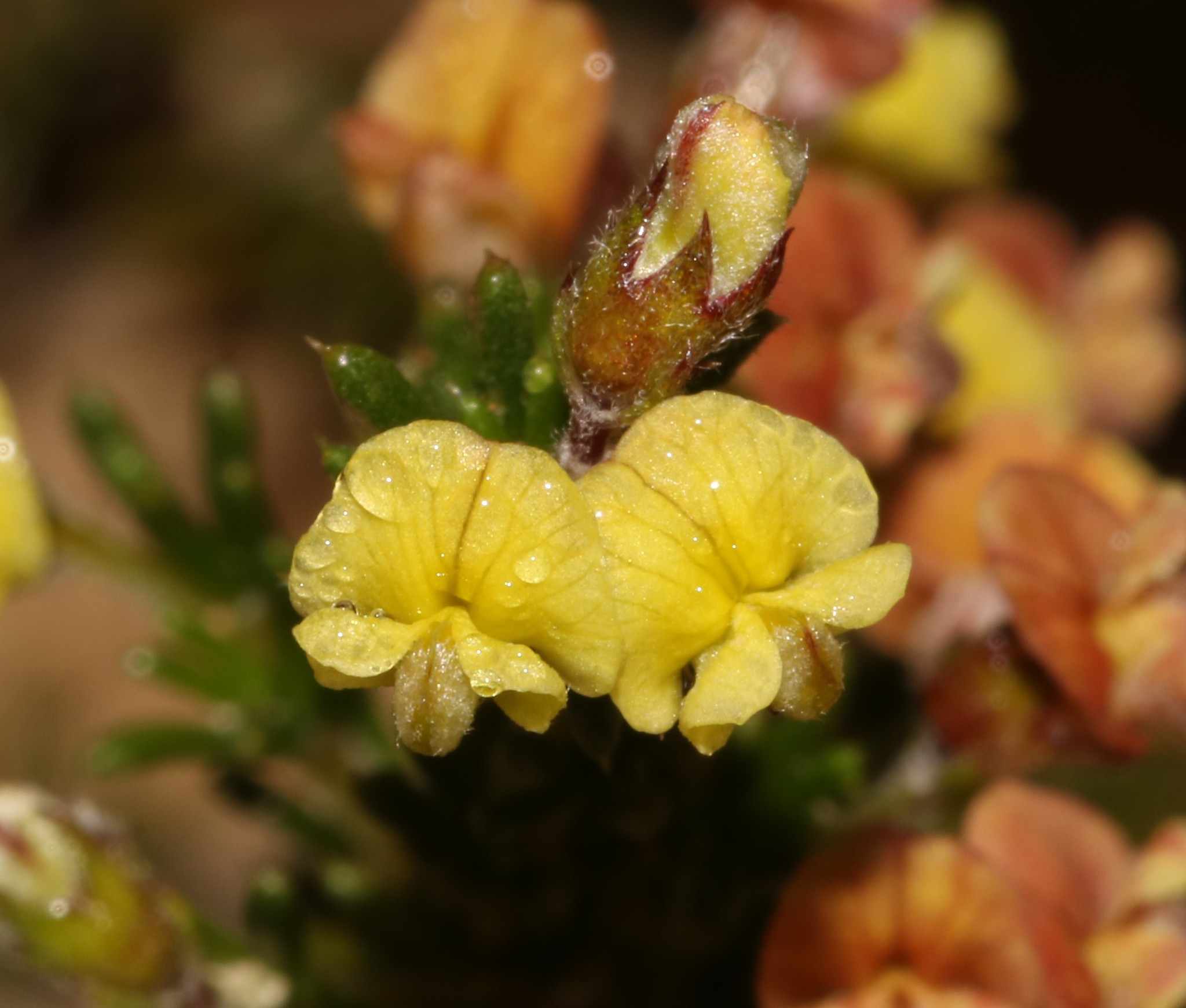

Scientific classification
- Kingdom: Plantae
- Clade: Tracheophytes
- Clade: Angiosperms
- Clade: Eudicots
- Clade: Rosids
- Order: Fabales
- Family: Fabaceae
- Subfamily: Faboideae
- Genus: Aspalathus
- Species: A. albens

Binomial name
- Aspalathus albens L.

Synonyms
- Achyronia agardhiana (DC.) Kuntze; Achyronia albens (L.) Kuntze; Achyronia armata (Thunb.) Kuntze; Achyronia exilis (Harv.) Kuntze; Aspalathus agardhiana DC.; Aspalathus albens var. virens E.Mey.; Aspalathus armata Thunb.; Aspalathus exilis Harv.; Buchenroedera teretifolia Eckl. & Zeyh.

= Aspalathus albens =

Species of plant

Aspalathus albens, the whitewashed Capegorse, is a small to medium-sized shrub belonging to the family Fabaceae. The species is endemic to the Northern Cape and the Western Cape and forms part of the fynbos. It occurs from southern Namaqualand to the Cape Peninsula. It has a range of 26 921 km^{2} and there are twenty subpopulations remaining. The plant has lost habitat and is locally extinct on the Cape Flats. Urban development is a threat at Mamre and Atlantis while crop cultivation is a threat between Hopefield and Darling. Invasive plants are also a threat between Hopefield and Melkbosstrand. Wildfire prevention is also a threat to the plant, as it requires fire to reproduce.
