= R307 (South Africa) =

Regional route in South Africa

Regional route R307
- R307 route map

Route information
- Length: 57 km (35 mi)

Major junctions
- North end: R45 near Moorreesburg
- R315 in Darling, Western Cape; R304 near Atlantis, Western Cape and Mamre
- South end: R27 near Melkbosstrand

Location
- Country: South Africa
- Towns: Melkbosstrand; Mamre; Darling; Moorreesburg

Highway system
- Numbered routes of South Africa
← R306	→ R308

The R307 is a Regional Route in South Africa that connects the R27 north of Melkbosstrand with the R45 south-west of Moorreesburg.

== Route ==
From its southern origin at the R27, it heads north-east to Atlantis. Here it meets a north-north-west / south-south-east road at a t-junction. The south-south-east section is signed as the R304, but the north-north-westerly route continues as the R307. This road passes through Mamre and then receives the R315 from the east. The two roads are co-signed and continue to Darling. Leaving the R315 again diverges, heading west, whereas the R307 now heads north-east. It ends at the R45.
