= Gydo Pass =

Coordinates: 33°14′02.1″S 19°19′50.8″E

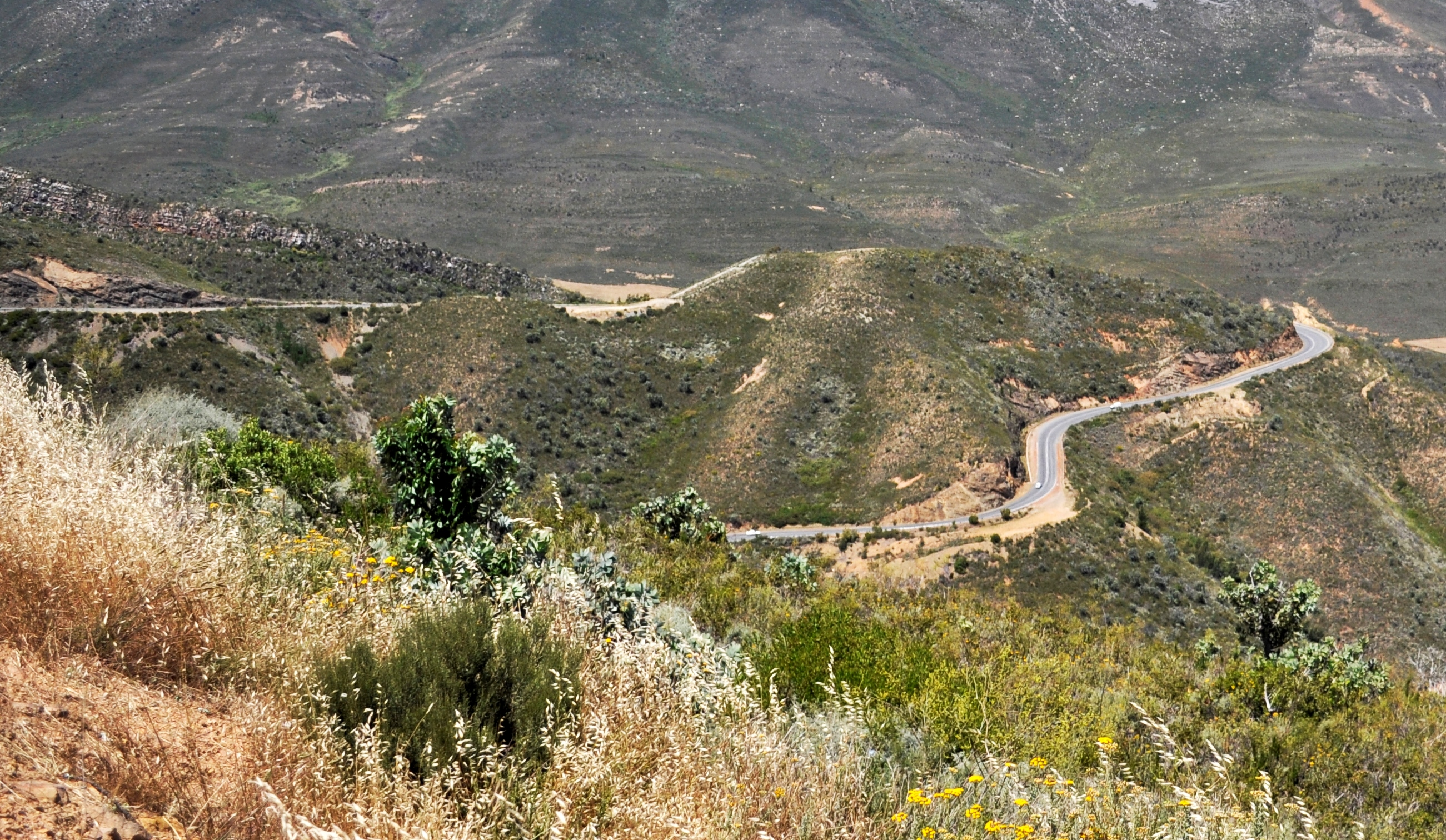
The pass with the slopes of Gydoberg in the background

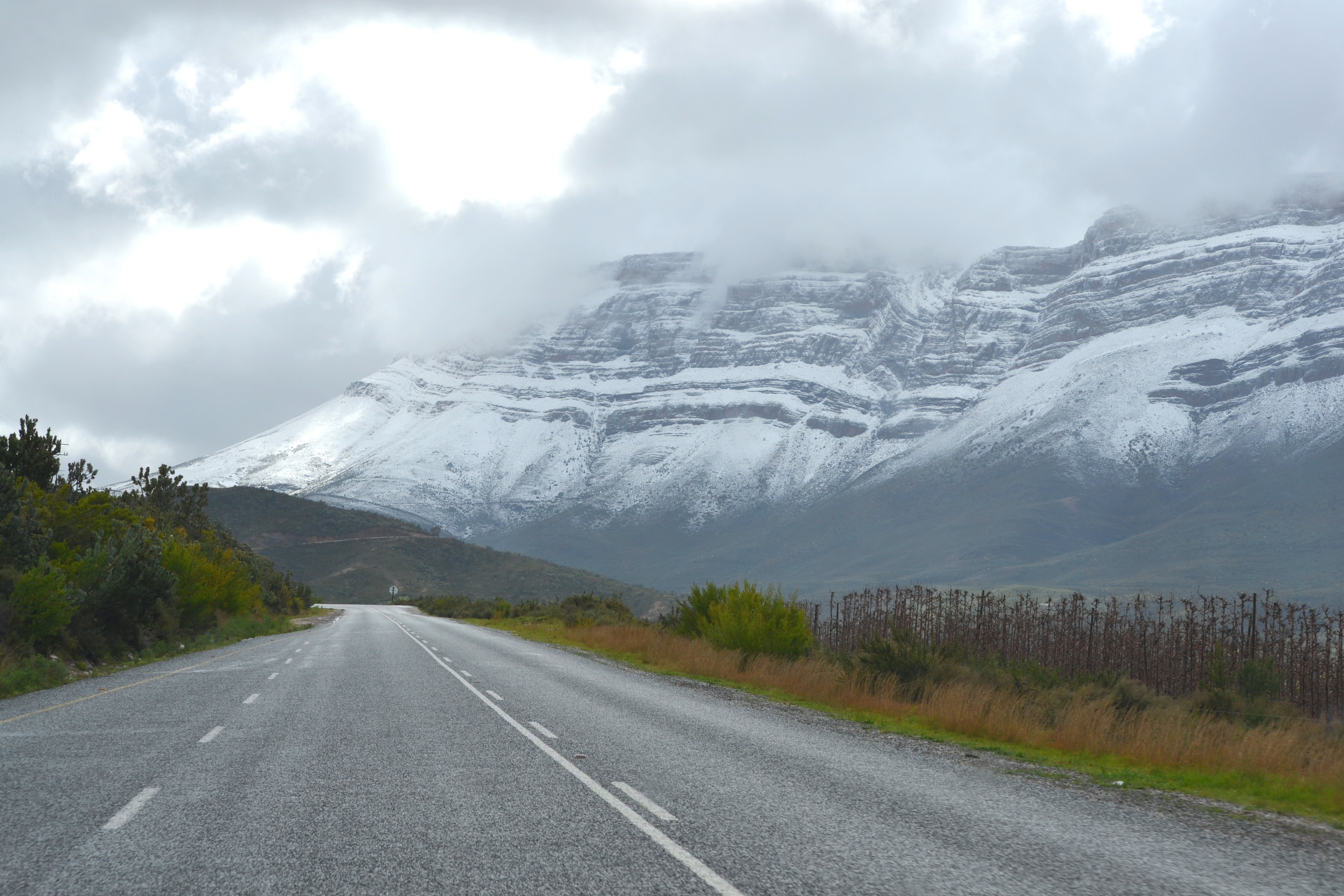
The pass between Ceres and Citrusdal in winter

Gydo Pass is situated in the Western Cape, province of South Africa on the Regional road R303, just north of Prince Alfred Hamlet between Ceres and Citrusdal.

The pass was built by convict labour under Andrew Geddes Bain in 1848.

== Be Aware ==
- Driving Skill level: last stretch towards Citrusdal requires advanced driving skills
- Road Condition: Tarred surface, except for first 20/30 kilometres from the Citrusdal end which is not tarred, sweeping turns, no safety barrier
- Remarks: Some tourist traffic. Fossil finds in roadside debris.
