= R303 (South Africa) =

Regional route in South Africa

Regional route R303
- R303 route map

Route information
- Length: 114 km (71 mi)

Major junctions
- South end: R46 at Ceres
- North end: N7 at Citrusdal

Location
- Country: South Africa
- Towns: Ceres, Prince Alfred Hamlet, Citrusdal

Highway system
- Numbered routes of South Africa
← R302	→ R304

The R303 is a regional route in South Africa that connects Citrusdal with Ceres via the Koue Bokkeveld.

== Route ==
Its northern terminus is a junction witt the N7 outside Citrusdal. It initially runs east and passes through Citrusdal before climbing over the Middelberg Pass and the Buffelshoek Pass. From there, it runs southward through the Koue Bokkeveld to the Gydo Pass, where it descends to Prince Alfred Hamlet and Ceres, where it ends at an intersection with the R46.
