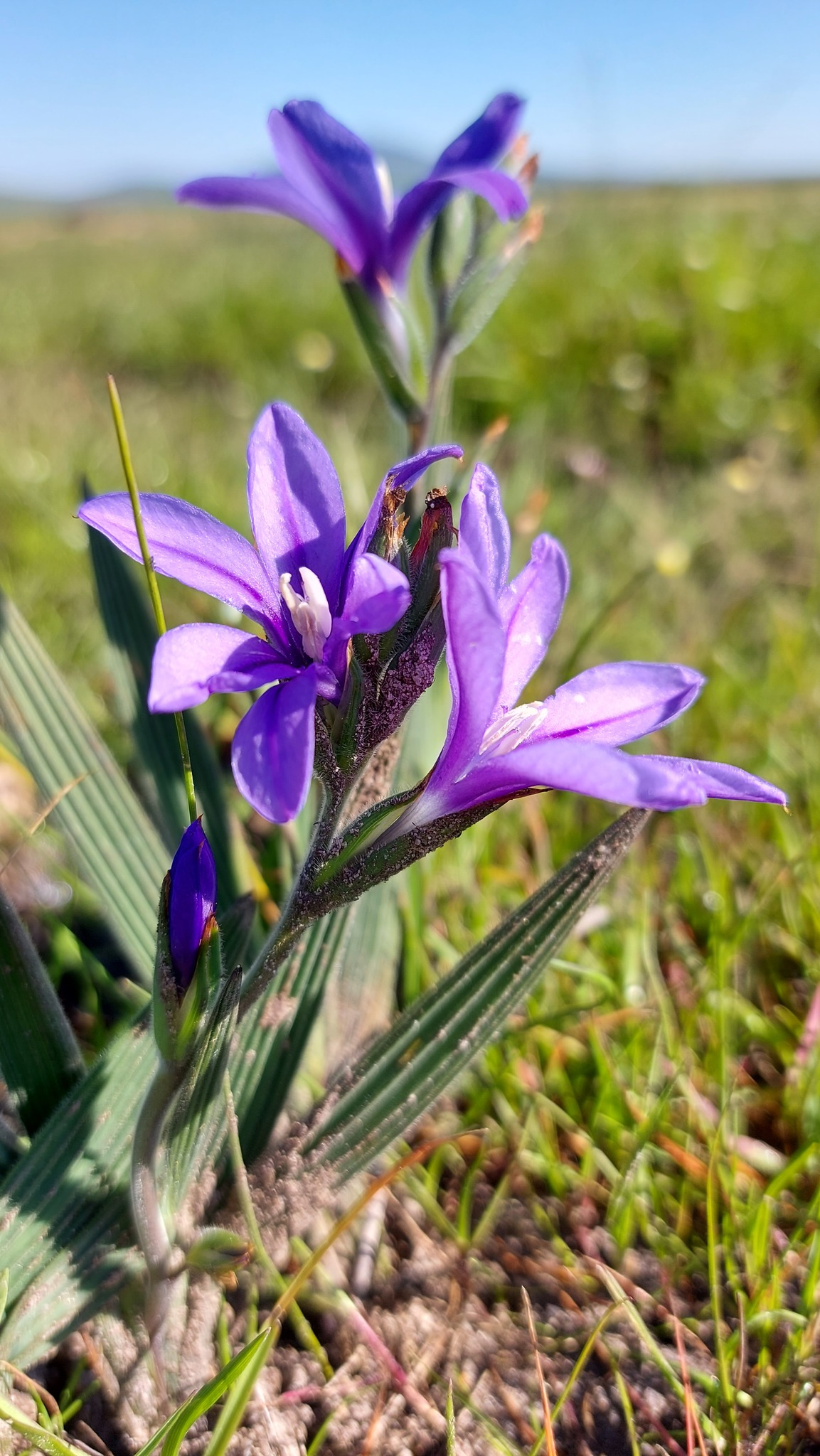

Scientific classification
- Kingdom: Plantae
- Clade: Tracheophytes
- Clade: Angiosperms
- Clade: Monocots
- Order: Asparagales
- Family: Iridaceae
- Genus: Babiana
- Species: B. leipoldtii

Binomial name
- Babiana leipoldtii G.J.Lewis

= Babiana leipoldtii =

Species of flowering plant

Babiana leipoldtii is a perennial flowering plant and geophyte belonging to the genus Babiana. The species is endemic to the Western Cape and is part of the renosterveld and fynbos. It occurs from Hopefield to Klipheuwel and Agter-Paarl. It has a range of 645 km² and the species has already lost 80% of its habitat to development and crop cultivation. The remaining subpopulations are threatened by invasive plants, further development and a lack of a fire program.
