= R313 road =

R313 road may refer to:

- R313 road (Ireland)
- R313 road (South Africa)
