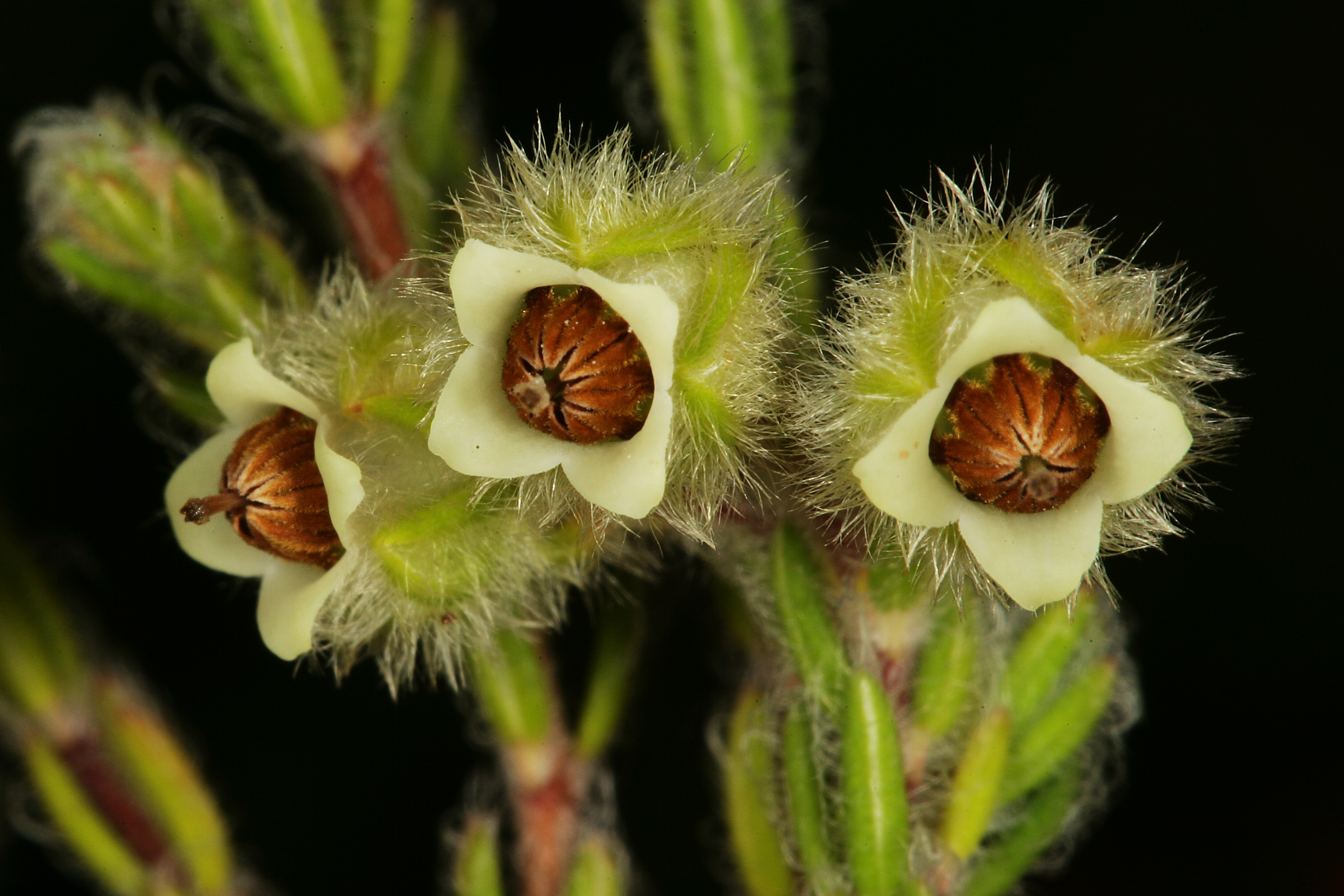

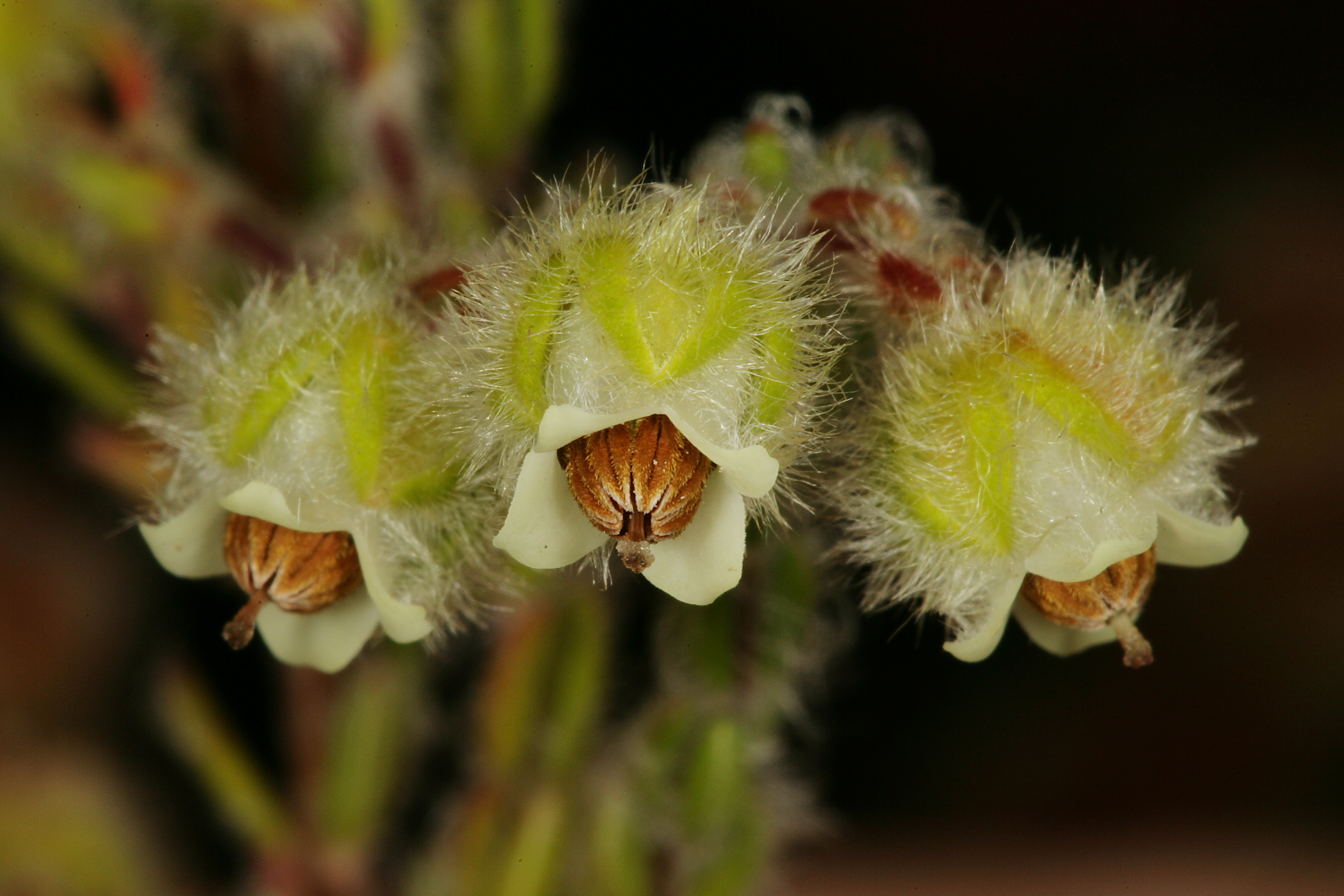

Scientific classification
- Kingdom: Plantae
- Clade: Tracheophytes
- Clade: Angiosperms
- Clade: Eudicots
- Clade: Asterids
- Order: Ericales
- Family: Ericaceae
- Genus: Erica
- Species: E. capitata

Binomial name
- Erica capitata L.

Synonyms
- Erica byssina Salisb.; Ericoides capitatum (L.) Kuntze; Eriodesmia capitata D.Don

= Erica capitata =

Species of flowering plant

Erica capitata is a plant belonging to the genus Erica and is part of the fynbos. The species is endemic to the Western Cape and occurs in the Cape Peninsula and from Groot Hagelkraal to Mamre. The plant has lost 50% of its habitat over the years due to development, agricultural activities and invasive plants but is still abundant in the Peninsula. Here 90% of the population is currently still protected but the habitat is further threatened.
