= Atlantis Special Economic Zone =

Special economic zone in Cape Town, South Africa

- Special economic zone
- Interactive map of Atlantis Special Economic Zone
- Location within Western Cape
- Coordinates: 33°35′39.6″S 18°28′21.0″E
- Country: South Africa
- Province: Western Cape
- Metropolitan municipality: City of Cape Town
- City: Cape Town
- Designated: 2018; 8 years ago

Area
  - Total: 1.186 km^{2} (0.458 sq mi)
- Time zone: UTC+2 (SAST)
- Website: atlantissez.com

The Atlantis Special Economic Zone (Atlantis SEZ) is a special economic zone in Cape Town, South Africa. Established in 2018, it focuses on green tech. It is administered by the Atlantis Special Economic Zone Company (ASEZCo).

The SEZ is a partnership between the City of Cape Town, Western Cape Government, Invest Cape Town, Wesgro, GreenCape, and the DTIC.

== History ==
The origins of the Atlantis Special Economic Zone date to 2011, when the City of Cape Town established a green technology manufacturing hub in Atlantis in response to the national government's new Renewable Energy Independent Power Producer Procurement Programme (REIPPPP). The initiative sought to attract renewable energy and other green technology manufacturers to Atlantis, and was supported by the City, the Western Cape Government, and GreenCape.

In 2013, the Western Cape Government and the Department of Trade and Industry signed a memorandum of understanding relating to the development of the SEZ. The provincial government subsequently submitted an application in 2015 for portions of the Atlantis Industrial area to be designated as a special economic zone.

Public consultations on the proposed SEZ were held in October 2017. The proposal received support from the community and other stakeholders, and the Special Economic Zones Advisory Board subsequently recommended its designation.

On 7 June 2018, the South African Cabinet approved the designation of the Atlantis Special Economic Zone. The zone was formally designated by the Minister of Trade and Industry under the Special Economic Zones Act, 2014 in October 2018.

The Atlantis SEZ was officially launched by President Cyril Ramaphosa on 6 December 2018. The zone was designated to promote manufacturing in green technologies and related industries, including renewable energy technologies and alternative building materials.

The Atlantis Special Economic Zone Company SOC Ltd (ASEZCo) was incorporated on 3 December 2019, and confirmed as a state-owned company in March 2020. It was subsequently listed as a Schedule 3D public entity under the Public Finance Management Act, 1999, in December 2021.

In 2020, the City of Cape Town transferred general industrial properties valued at R56.5 million to ASEZCo as part of the arrangements to establish the SEZ, and enable the company to manage and contract on the land. The transfer was intended to provide the SEZ with land on which to attract and accommodate new investment.

By 2021, the SEZ had attracted approximately R680 million in investment, with companies involved in sectors including geotextiles, wind tower manufacturing, and energy-efficient windows. The City subsequently continued to transfer and register municipal properties for the development of the SEZ.

In March 2025, the transfer of City-owned properties to the Atlantis SEZ was formally registered, marking a major milestone in the development of the zone's land holdings.

In April 2025, ASEZCo launched the development of Zone 1, a 22-hectare area that included the construction of Quantum V3, an acetylene gas manufacturing facility. By the 2024/25 financial year, ASEZCo reported that bulk supply infrastructure in Zone 1 had been completed. At the time, total investment attracted to the SEZ had reached R2.77 billion and 457 jobs had been created.

In its 2026 annual report, ASEZCo noted that since 2025, the SEZ had welcomed visitors from countries including Italy, China, Brazil, Japan, the Netherlands, Denmark, Ireland, Belgium, and Uzbekistan.

== Location ==
The Atlantis SEZ is located within Atlantis Industrial, a suburb of the City of Cape Town in the city's far north. It forms part of the town of Atlantis.

The SEZ is situated approximately 50km from Cape Town CBD and the Port of Cape Town, 15km from the coast at Koeberg Nature Reserve, and 70km from Cape Town International Airport, and 60km from the town of Malmesbury to its northeast.

=== Transit ===
The nearest major roadway to the Atlantis SEZ is the national N7 freeway, which connects to the N1 further into Cape Town, in Milnerton.

The rural R27 road runs along the coast to the left of the SEZ. The R304 and R307 serve as feeder roads in and out of the SEZ.

== Features ==
The SEZ consists of Zones 1, 2, and 3, a Green Manufacturing Hub, and an Eco-Green Link (EGL) Building.

=== Tenants ===
Among the companies based in the Atlantis SEZ are:

Company	Manufacturing industry sector	Established	Ref
Ahlesa Textile Manufacturers	Textiles	1996; 30 years ago	
Everflo	Industrial refrigeration equipment	2002; 24 years ago	
Gestamp Renewable Industries	Wind turbine towers	2008; 18 years ago	
Iconic Gases	Industrial and specialty gases	2017; 9 years ago	
Kaytech Engineered Fabrics	Geosynthetics	1971; 55 years ago	
Mint & Honey	Food and beverages	2018; 8 years ago	
Modulêr Electrical Assemblies	Electrical equipment	2022; 4 years ago	
Swartland	Building materials	1951; 75 years ago	

=== Sustainable development ===
The entirety of the SEZ was planned to be developed on the principles of sustainable construction, integrating green tech throughout. These principles include net zero carbon, net zero water, resource efficiency, and social inclusion.

The site features stormwater swales and retention ponds, a rainwater harvesting system, and permeable paving incorporated into its design, as part of its net zero water architecture.

In keeping with its net zero carbon design, Atlantis SEZ has solar paving sidewalks, bicycle lanes, roof-mounted solar panels for its Quantum V3 factory, specialized landscaping to absorb carbon, as well as certain structures built using hempcrete, which is a carbon-negative building material. The landscaping is focused on establishing indigenous vegetation on site.

== Corporate social investment ==
Under its 2023 CSI Policy, the Atlantis Special Economic Zone Company undertakes annual funding of eligible nonprofits and community-based organizations in Atlantis.

== See also ==
- Economy of the Western Cape
