= Siyathemba Local Municipality elections =

The Siyathemba Local Municipality council in the Pixley ka Seme District Municipality district of the Northern Cape province of South Africa consists of eleven members elected by mixed-member proportional representation. Six councillors are elected by first-past-the-post voting in six wards, while the remaining five are chosen from party lists so that the total number of party representatives is proportional to the number of votes received. In the election of 1 November 2021 the African National Congress (ANC) lost its majority, but remains the largest party, with five seats.

== Results ==
The following table shows the composition of the council after past elections.

Event	ANC	DA	Other	Total
2000 election	5	3	—	8
2006 election	5	3	0	8
2011 election	5	1	2	8
2016 election	6	3	0	9
2021 election	5	2	4	11

== December 2000 election ==
The following table shows the results of the 2000 election.

Party	Ward			List			Total seats
Party	Votes	%	Seats	Votes	%	Seats	Total seats
African National Congress	3,237	57.17	2	3,223	57.14	3	5
Democratic Alliance	2,425	42.83	2	2,418	42.86	1	3
Total	5,662	100.00	4	5,641	100.00	4	8
Valid votes	5,662	98.09		5,641	97.70		
Invalid/blank votes	110	1.91		133	2.30		
Total votes	5,772	100.00		5,774	100.00		
Registered voters/turnout	9,089	63.51		9,089	63.53		

== March 2006 election ==
The following table shows the results of the 2006 election.

Party	Ward			List			Total seats
Party	Votes	%	Seats	Votes	%	Seats	Total seats
African National Congress	3,165	63.29	4	3,170	63.41	1	5
Democratic Alliance	1,717	34.33	0	1,709	34.19	3	3
African Christian Democratic Party	119	2.38	0	120	2.40	0	0
Total	5,001	100.00	4	4,999	100.00	4	8
Valid votes	5,001	97.13		4,999	97.20		
Invalid/blank votes	148	2.87		144	2.80		
Total votes	5,149	100.00		5,143	100.00		
Registered voters/turnout	10,145	50.75		10,145	50.69		

== May 2011 election ==
The following table shows the results of the 2011 election.

Party	Ward			List			Total seats
Party	Votes	%	Seats	Votes	%	Seats	Total seats
African National Congress	4,414	56.01	4	4,508	57.03	1	5
Congress of the People	2,100	26.65	0	2,018	25.53	2	2
Democratic Alliance	1,367	17.35	0	1,379	17.44	1	1
Total	7,881	100.00	4	7,905	100.00	4	8
Valid votes	7,881	98.08		7,905	98.44		
Invalid/blank votes	154	1.92		125	1.56		
Total votes	8,035	100.00		8,030	100.00		
Registered voters/turnout	11,306	71.07		11,306	71.02		

== August 2016 election ==
The following table shows the results of the 2016 election.

Party	Ward			List			Total seats
Party	Votes	%	Seats	Votes	%	Seats	Total seats
African National Congress	4,555	58.88	5	4,661	60.23	1	6
Democratic Alliance	2,343	30.29	0	2,437	31.49	3	3
Independent candidates	424	5.48	0				0
Economic Freedom Fighters	143	1.85	0	267	3.45	0	0
Congress of the People	164	2.12	0	237	3.06	0	0
Freedom Front Plus	107	1.38	0	108	1.40	0	0
Khoisan Revolution	0	0.00	0	29	0.37	0	0
Total	7,736	100.00	5	7,739	100.00	4	9
Valid votes	7,736	98.06		7,739	98.10		
Invalid/blank votes	153	1.94		150	1.90		
Total votes	7,889	100.00		7,889	100.00		
Registered voters/turnout	12,107	65.16		12,107	65.16		

== November 2021 election ==
The following table shows the results of the 2021 election.

Party	Ward			List			Total seats
Party	Votes	%	Seats	Votes	%	Seats	Total seats
African National Congress	3,289	44.30	5	3,310	44.51	0	5
Siyathemba Community Movement	2,959	39.85	1	2,937	39.49	3	4
Democratic Alliance	950	12.79	0	942	12.67	2	2
Freedom Front Plus	200	2.69	0	221	2.97	0	0
Economic Freedom Fighters	27	0.36	0	27	0.36	0	0
Total	7,425	100.00	6	7,437	100.00	5	11
Valid votes	7,425	98.79		7,437	98.75		
Invalid/blank votes	91	1.21		94	1.25		
Total votes	7,516	100.00		7,531	100.00		
Registered voters/turnout	12,434	60.45		12,434	60.57		

=== By-elections from November 2021 ===
The following by-elections were held to fill vacant ward seats in the period from November 2021.

Date	Ward	Party of the previous councillor	Party of the newly elected councillor
14 May 2026	2	Siyathemba Community Movement	African National Congress

Following the 2021 elections, the African National Congress (ANC) lost its majority and governed with the Siyathemba Community Movement (SGB). The SGB held the mayoral chain, and the ANC the speaker position. The SGB councillor for ward two, Ronald Februarie, resigned to form a new party, d'Bokke, and a by-election was held in May 2026. The ANC candidate narrowly defeated Februarie, with the SGB trailing in distant third place.
