= R313 =

R313 may refer to:

- R313 road (Ireland)
- R313 (South Africa), a road
- Rogožarski R-313, aircraft of the Yugoslav air force in WWII
