= Tyger Valley =

Suburb and commercial area in the City of Cape Town, Western Cape

Tyger Valley Tygervallei
- Suburb and commercial district
- The Tyger Waterfront, with residential buildings in one of the old quarry areas
- Country: South Africa
- Province: Western Cape
- Municipality: City of Cape Town
- Area: Bellville

Government
  - Councilor: Ronel Viljoen (Democratic Alliance)
- Time zone: UTC+2 (SAST)
- Street postal code: 7530
- Telephone area code: 021

Tyger Valley, also spelled Tygervalley, and Tygervallei in Afrikaans, is a suburb and major commercial district in the City of Cape Town, and part of the town of Bellville, in the Western Cape province of South Africa.

The area consists of a variety of low-rise commercial office buildings, condominiums, multiple shopping centers, a sports complex, and the Tyger Waterfront retail and commercial district.

== Geography ==
Tyger Valley is both a sub-place within the town of Bellville, Western Cape, and a suburb in terms of the planning districts of the City of Cape Town metro. It is located approximately 24km from Cape Town CBD, and around 6km from the suburb of Durbanville.

The suburb is bordered by the suburbs of Hume and Kenever to the north, the N1 freeway to the south, Ridgeworth and Bo Oakdale to the east, and Welgemoed to the west.

== History ==
Until the early 1980s, much of the area now known as Tyger Valley was occupied by clay and stone quarries, which is still evident in the landscape today. Quarrying operations ceased in 1973, and the land was subsequently acquired by Bellville City Council in 1980 (before the area's amalgamation into the City of Cape Town metro), enabling its redevelopment for commercial and recreational purposes.

The opening of the large Tyger Valley Centre shopping mall in August 1985 marked the beginning of the area's transformation into a major commercial district. The shopping center was expanded in 1991, while surrounding land was progressively developed for offices, retail, and recreational facilities.

During the 1990s, Tyger Valley developed into an important commercial and recreational center, attracting corporate office developments and new sporting facilities, including the Bellville Velodrome, completed in 1997. In 1998, the City of Tygerberg adopted the Elsieskraal River Valley Development Framework to coordinate future development, improve public spaces, and guide continued commercial growth.

In 2016, the City of Cape Town approved the establishment of the Tygervalley Improvement District, following approximately two and a half years of planning. The special improvement district was created to provide additional public safety, cleaning, and urban management services across a substantial part of the commercial area, excluding Tyger Valley Centre and Willowbridge Shopping Centre.

== Transit ==
The area is situated beside the N1 freeway, a major national road that runs southwest towards Cape Town CBD and northeast towards the town of Paarl. Running alongside Tyger Valley is the R302 (Willie Van Schoor Avenue), connecting the Bellville CBD area to the central part of Durbanville.

Tyger Valley is situated almost equidistant from Cape Town's two main airports - around 15km from Cape Town International and around 18km from the in-development Cape Winelands Airport.

== Demographics ==
Tyger Valley does not have a separately published demographic profile in the City of Cape Town's 2011 census suburb statistics. The Bellville Park census suburb overlaps with parts of Tyger Valley, but does not encompass the wider Tyger Valley commercial district.

Bellville Park spans a total area of 2.16 sqkm. In 2011, it recorded a population of 1,538 residents across 837 households, for an average household size of 1.84. In that same census, it was recorded that in Bellville Park, 40.54% of residents spoke Afrikaans as their first language, followed by English at 37.44%.

== Commerce ==
The area consists of many commercial offices, including satellite offices for large South African corporates. These include the head offices of Santam and PSG Financial Services, as well as offices for PepsiCo South Africa, Pioneer Foods, Momentum Group, Pepkor, Afrimat, Curro Holdings, Fairtree, Investec, and FirstRand.

In terms of retail, the area includes the Tyger Valley Centre shopping mall, Willowbridge Shopping Centre, and Willowbridge Village.

== Education ==
Stellenbosch Business School, the business school of the University of Stellenbosch, is located on Carl Cronje Drive in Tyger Valley. It includes the university's School of Public Leadership.

== Governance ==
Tyger Valley forms part of the City of Cape Town's Ward 70, and as of 2026, is represented by Councilor Ronel Viljoen of the Democratic Alliance.
