= R312 (South Africa) =

Regional route in South Africa

Regional route R312
- R312 route map

Route information
- Length: 21 km (13 mi)

Major junctions
- West end: R302 at Fisantekraal
- R304 near Cape Winelands Airport
- East end: R44 near Wellington

Location
- Country: South Africa

Highway system
- Numbered routes of South Africa
← R311	→ R313

The R312 is a Regional Route in Western Cape, South Africa.

== Route ==
Its western origin is a junction with the R302 at Fisantekraal (approximately 8 kilometres north-east of Durbanville) and it heads east as Lichtenburg Road, passing by the Cape Winelands Airport and crossing the R304 to end at a junction with the R44 approximately 12 kilometres south-west of Wellington.
