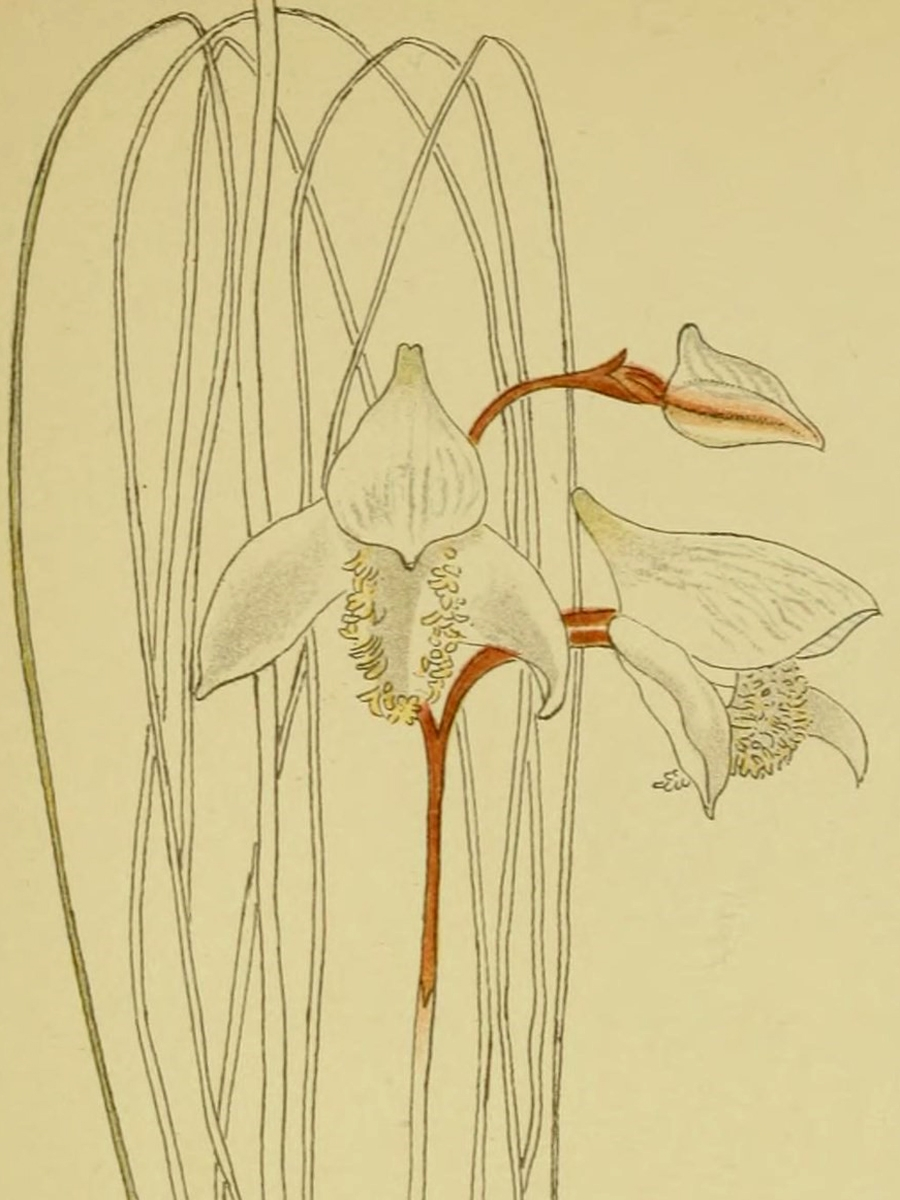

Scientific classification
- Kingdom: Plantae
- Clade: Tracheophytes
- Clade: Angiosperms
- Clade: Monocots
- Order: Asparagales
- Family: Orchidaceae
- Subfamily: Orchidoideae
- Genus: Disa
- Species: D. barbata

Binomial name
- Disa barbata (L.f.) Sw.

Synonyms
- Herschelia barbata (L.f.) Bolus; Herschelianthe barbata (L.f.) Rauschert; Orchis barbata L.f.; Satyrium barbatum (L.f.) Thunb.

= Disa barbata =

Species of flowering plant

Disa barbata is a perennial plant and geophyte that belongs to the genus Disa and is part of the fynbos. The species is endemic to the Western Cape and now only occurs at Malmesbury. The plant used to occur on the Cape Flats and Cape Peninsula but has given up 90% of its habitat to suburban development. There is currently only one population at Malmesbury. An annual survey from 2001 to 2006 showed that there are only 110 individual plants left. The remaining plants are threatened by invasive plants such as the Acacia species as well as pollinators that decrease as a result of uncontrolled fires.
