= R302 (South Africa) =

Regional route in South Africa

Regional route R302
- R302 route map

Route information
- Length: 54 km (34 mi)

Major junctions
- South end: R102 in Bellville
- N1 exit 23; R312 at Fisantekraal; R304 at Klipheuwel; R315 in Malmesbury
- North end: R45 in Malmesbury

Location
- Country: South Africa

Highway system
- Numbered routes of South Africa
← R301	→ R303

The R302 is a Regional Route in the Western Cape province of South Africa that connects Bellville with Malmesbury. It covers a distance of 54 kilometres (34 mi) in a north-south direction.

== Route ==
The route begins at an intersection with the R102 (Voortrekker Road) in Bellville, City of Cape Town. It runs along Durban Road, which soon splits into two one-way roads, the northbound road becoming Willie van Schoor Avenue while the southbound remains Durban Road. It crosses the N1 freeway at exit 23. The two directions rejoin at Tyger Valley and continue to Durbanville as Durbanville Avenue and then Main Road. In Durbanville Central the route turns right and runs along Wellington Road before leaving the built-up area. At Fisantekraal it passes the western end of the R312 (Lichtenburg Road), and at Klipheuwel it crosses and briefly overlaps the R304. It enters Malmesbury along Voortrekker Road, passing the eastern end of the R315 (Bokomo Road) before ending at the R45 (Piet Retief Street).
