= R306 (South Africa) =

Regional route in South Africa

Regional route R306
- R306 route map

Route information
- Length: 110 km (68 mi)

Major junctions
- Northwest end: R61 near Beaufort West
- Southeast end: N9 near Willowmore

Location
- Country: South Africa
- Towns: Rietbron

Highway system
- Numbered routes of South Africa
← R305	→ R307

The R306 is a Regional Route in South Africa that connects the N9 between Willowmore and Aberdeen with the R61 between Beaufort West and Aberdeen.

== Route ==
The R306 begins at a junction with the N9 route approximately 18 kilometres north of Willowmore in the Eastern Cape. It heads in a north-westerly direction for 110 kilometres, through Rietbron, crossing into the Western Cape, to reach its end at a junction with the R61 route approximately 18 kilometres east of Beaufort West.
