= Martin Wragge =

- Born: John Martin Wragge; South Africa
- Occupations: Property developer, film producer, screenwriter
- Known for: Century City, Canal Walk, Tyger Valley Centre, Monex Group

John Martin Wragge is a South African property developer and film producer. He founded the Monex Development Group and oversaw the commercial development of the Century City precinct, Canal Walk shopping center, and the Tyger Valley Shopping Centre.

== Property development ==
=== Monex and Tyger Valley ===
Wragge founded Monex Development Group in 1980, serving as chairman and chief executive officer. Monex developed commercial and retail real estate projects in the Western Cape. In the mid-1980s, the company developed the Tyger Valley Shopping Centre in Bellville, creating an 87,000 square meter retail center. Monex listed on the Johannesburg Stock Exchange (JSE) in 1995.

=== Century City and Canal Walk ===
In 1996, Monex acquired Ilco Homes, obtaining control of a 250-hectare site adjacent to the N1 highway near Cape Town. Monex planned the Century City mixed-use development, securing municipal approvals for over 680,000 square meters of commercial, residential, and retail density.

The project included two key assets:

- **Ratanga Junction:** A theme park opened in 1998.
- **Canal Walk Shopping Centre:** A 135,000 square meter regional retail mall that opened in October 2000.

Following financial pressure related to development debt, Wragge resigned from Monex in September 2001. Rabie Property Group subsequently acquired the remaining development rights for Century City in 2004.

=== China developments ===
Between 2002 and 2011, Wragge worked as CEO of China Development Company Limited. The firm built retail projects in Northwest China, including the 141,000 square meter Kisswater Centre and the 56-hectare Forest Park in Ningxia Province. He received a Gold Medal Award from Premier Wen Jiabao in 2007 for foreign contributions to regional economic development.

=== Other directorships ===
Wragge served as a non-executive director of Tradehold Limited. As Chairman of Gritprop Investments, he worked on residential developments, including the Altona Residential Village in Worcester, Western Cape.

== Film production ==
Wragge produced and wrote feature films in the 1970s and 1980s:

- Death of a Snowman (1976):
  - Crime thriller directed by Christopher Rowley and written by Bima Stagg.
- Survivor (1987):
  - Feature film (producer).
- The Last Warrior (1989):
  - World War II action film starring Gary Graham (director, writer, and producer).
