= GreenCape =

South African green economy nonprofit

- Formation: 2010; 16 years ago
- Founder: City of Cape Town; Western Cape Government
- Type: Nonprofit development organization
- Registration no.: 2012/039750/08
- Legal status: Active
- Purpose: Promoting a green economy in Africa
- Headquarters: Cape Town, South Africa
- Region served: Africa
- Services: Green economy development Market intelligence Investment facilitation Policy support
- Fields: Green economy
- Members: 3,050 (2024)
- Key people: Mike Mulcahy (CEO)
- Funding: South African government agencies and the private sector
- Staff: 42 (2026)
- Website: greencape.co.za

GreenCape is a South African nonprofit development organization. Founded in 2010 and headquartered in Cape Town, its stated goal is to promote the green economy both in South Africa, and throughout the African continent.

As a market development and facilitation organization, GreenCape works to remove barriers to growth for businesses and investors in the sector, and interfaces with all levels of government to build a green economy.

== History ==
GreenCape was established in 2010 by the Western Cape Government and City of Cape Town, as a special-purpose vehicle to unlock green economy opportunities.

For the years 2013 through 2019, GreenCape was appointed the project management unit of the Atlantis Special Economic Zone (SEZ). The project is the only green tech SEZ in Africa, and has attracted over R3 billion in investment and created over 800 jobs, as of August 2026.

In 2020, after 10 years of operations, GreenCape reported that through leveraging its funding partnerships and industry networks, it had facilitated around R41 billion in investment into the South African green economy, which supported the creation of approximately 19,000 direct green jobs.

== Operations ==
GreenCape advocates for and helps facilitate the growth of the green economy across sectors including sustainable agriculture, water, energy, and green finance. It works with businesses, investors, academia, and government to generate investment and employment potential within the African green economy.

As of 2026, GreenCape aims to catalyze a further R45 billion in green economy infrastructure investment, and create 15,000 related jobs across Sub-Saharan Africa.

The organization publishes market intelligence reports pertaining to the Western Cape and South Africa. Report sectors include logistics, transport, renewable energy, water, and agriculture.

GreenCape's industry partners include the Western Cape Government, the City of Cape Town, the South African Treasury, WesGro, Invest Cape Town, Climate Finance Accelerator (CFA), the French Development Agency (AFD), the United Nations Industrial Development Organization (UNIDO), the UK Government, the New Zealand High Commission, the GIZ, the Friedrich Naumann Foundation, the BMZ, and Business France.

== Funding ==
GreenCape receives funding from the Western Cape Department of Economic Development and Tourism, the City of Cape Town's Department of Enterprise Development and Investment, numerous national government departments, development finance institutions, international funders, foundations, and the private sector.

== Recognition ==
In 2023, GreenCape won Organisation of the Year at the Charge Awards, which is focused on the world's best sustainable energy brands. GreenCape won for its positive impact on its community over the preceding year.

== See also ==
- Economy of South Africa
