= Philadelphia, South Africa =

Philadelphia
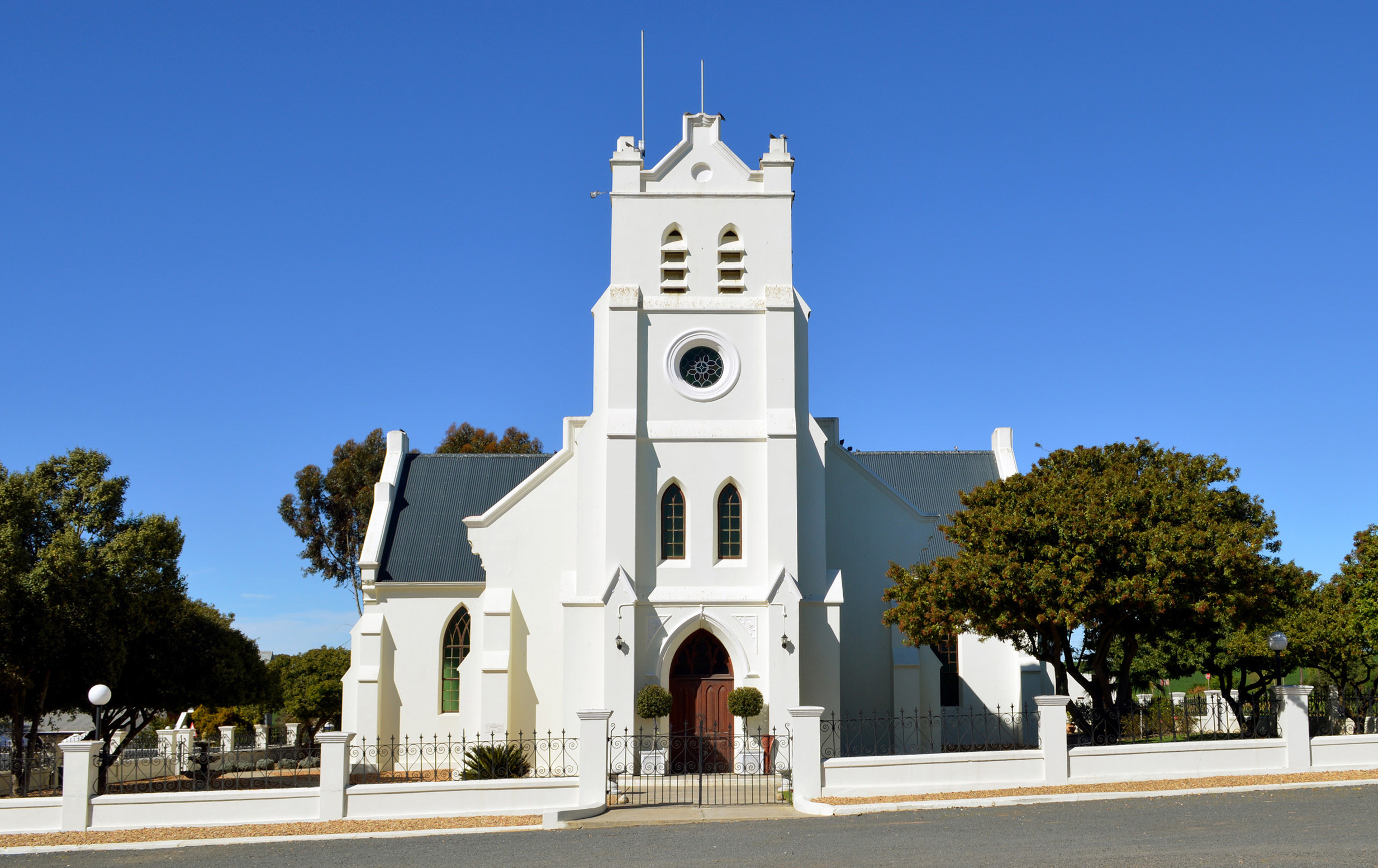
- Dutch Reformed Church in Philadelphia

- Location within Western Cape Location within South Africa
- Coordinates: 33.666°S 18.582°E
- Country: South Africa
- Province: Western Cape
- Municipality: City of Cape Town

Government
  - Councillor: Francois Berry (DA)

Area
  - Total: 0.43 km^{2} (0.17 sq mi)

Population (2011)
  - Total: 570
  - Density: 1,300/km^{2} (3,400/sq mi)

Racial makeup (2011)
  - Black African: 7.2%
  - Coloured: 59.1%
  - White: 33.7%

First languages (2011)
  - Afrikaans: 86.7%
  - English: 10.4%
  - Xhosa: 1.1%
  - Tswana: 1.1%
  - Other: 0.9%
- Time zone: UTC+2 (SAST)
- PO box: 7304
- Area code: 021

Philadelphia (Afrikaans pronunciation: [fələˈdælfia]) is a village in the Western Cape province of South Africa.

This village is 33 km south-west of Malmesbury and 23 km north-east of Durbanville. It was developed from a parish of the Dutch Reformed Church established in 1863. The name is of biblical origin (Rev. 3:7-13) and means 'brotherly love.'

== Transport ==
Philadelphia lies on the R304 regional route which passes through the village as "Philadelphia Road" which runs eastwards to connect the village to the N7 highway (to Cape Town and Malmesbury) and Atlantis in the north-east and westwards to connect the village to Stellenbosch in the south-east. About 7 km east of Philadelphia, the M58 (Adderley Road) runs from the R304 to Durbanville in the south, one of the nearest large towns to the village.
