= Tyger Valley Centre =

Shopping mall in Cape Town

Tyger Valley Shopping Centre
- Location: Bellville, City of Cape Town, South Africa
- Coordinates: 33.8737°S 18.6340°E
- Address: Corner of Bill Bezuidenhout Ave and Willie Van Schoor Dr, Bellville, 7536
- Opened: 1985; 41 years ago
- Renovated: 2012; 14 years ago
- Developer: Martin Wragge
- Manager: Mowana Properties
- Owner: Pareto (57.5%)
- Num. of stores: 230+ (2026)
- Num. of anchor tenants: 3
- Floor area: 90,382m²
- Floors: 4
- Parking: 6,000 bays
- Website: tygervalley.co.za

One of the entrances to Tyger Valley Centre

Vehicle entrance on the southern side of the mall

Tyger Valley Centre is a large shopping mall located in Tyger Valley, a suburb of the City of Cape Town. It is majority owned by South African property investment company Pareto.

Having opened in 1985, Tyger Valley has undergone multiple refurbishments and expansions, with the most recent being done in 2012.

The mall has a retail area of 90,382m², with over 230 stores across four floors, and a total of 6,000 parking bays. Its anchor tenants are Pick n Pay, Woolworths, and Game. The mall serves as a popular shopping destination for those in Cape Town's Northern Suburbs region.

== See also ==
- Retailing in South Africa
