= R305 (South Africa) =

Regional route in South Africa

Regional route R305
- R305 route map

Route information
- Length: 26 km (16 mi)

Major junctions
- North end: N2 near Riversdale
- South end: Stilbaai

Location
- Country: South Africa
- Towns: Stilbaai

Highway system
- Numbered routes of South Africa
← R304	→ R306

The R305 is a Regional Route in South Africa that runs from coastal Stilbaai in the south north to the N2, approximately 10 km from Riversdale and 25 km from Albertinia.
