= R315 (South Africa) =

Regional route in South Africa

Regional route R315
- R315 route map

Major junctions
- West end: Yzerfontein on the West coast
- R27 near Yzerfontein; R307 at Darling; N7 at Malmesbury
- East end: R302 in Malmesbury

Location
- Country: South Africa
- Towns: Darling; Malmesbury; Yzerfontein

Highway system
- Numbered routes of South Africa
← R313	→ R316

The R315 is a Regional Route in South Africa that connects Yzerfontein on the West coast with Malmesbury to the east via Darling.

== Route ==
From Yzerfontein, it heads east. It crosses the R27 to reach Darling. At Darling, it meets the R307 and becomes co-signed with it heading south. Just south of the town, it diverges, again heading east. It reaches Malmesbury, where it crosses the N7 and proceeds to end at a junction with the R302.
