= Klipheuwel =

- Location within Western Cape Location within South Africa
- Coordinates: 33.724°S 18.707°E
- Country: South Africa
- Province: Western Cape
- Municipality: City of Cape Town

Area
  - Total: 2.19 km^{2} (0.85 sq mi)

Population (2011)
  - Total: 2,294
  - Density: 1,050/km^{2} (2,710/sq mi)

Racial makeup (2011)
  - Black African: 54.1%
  - Coloured: 38.6%
  - Indian/Asian: 0.1%
  - White: 6.8%
  - Other: 0.4%

First languages (2011)
  - Afrikaans: 43.2%
  - Xhosa: 34.0%
  - Sotho: 14.2%
  - English: 6.5%
  - Other: 2.1%
- Time zone: UTC+2 (SAST)
- PO box: 7550

Klipheuwel is a village of about 2,300 people situated 15 kilometres (9.3 mi) north of Durbanville, in the Western Cape province of South Africa. In the 1920s it was the site of a shortwave transmitter constructed by the Marconi Company as part of the Imperial Wireless Chain. It remains today the site of the transmitter for the Cape Talk AM radio station.

== Roads ==
Klipheuwel is located between the R302 and R304 regional routes. The R302 (Malmesbury Road) connects to Durbanville in the south-west and Malmesbury in the north, whilst the R304 (Philadelphia Road) connects to Philadelphia and Atlantis in the north-west and Stellenbosch in the south-east. The R304 also provides Klipheuwel access to the N1 freeway (to the south) and N7 freeway (to the west).
