= Dutch Reformed Church, Swartland =

Church in Malmesbury, South Africa

Coordinates: 33°27′47.06″S 18°43′51.75″E

Dutch Reformed Church
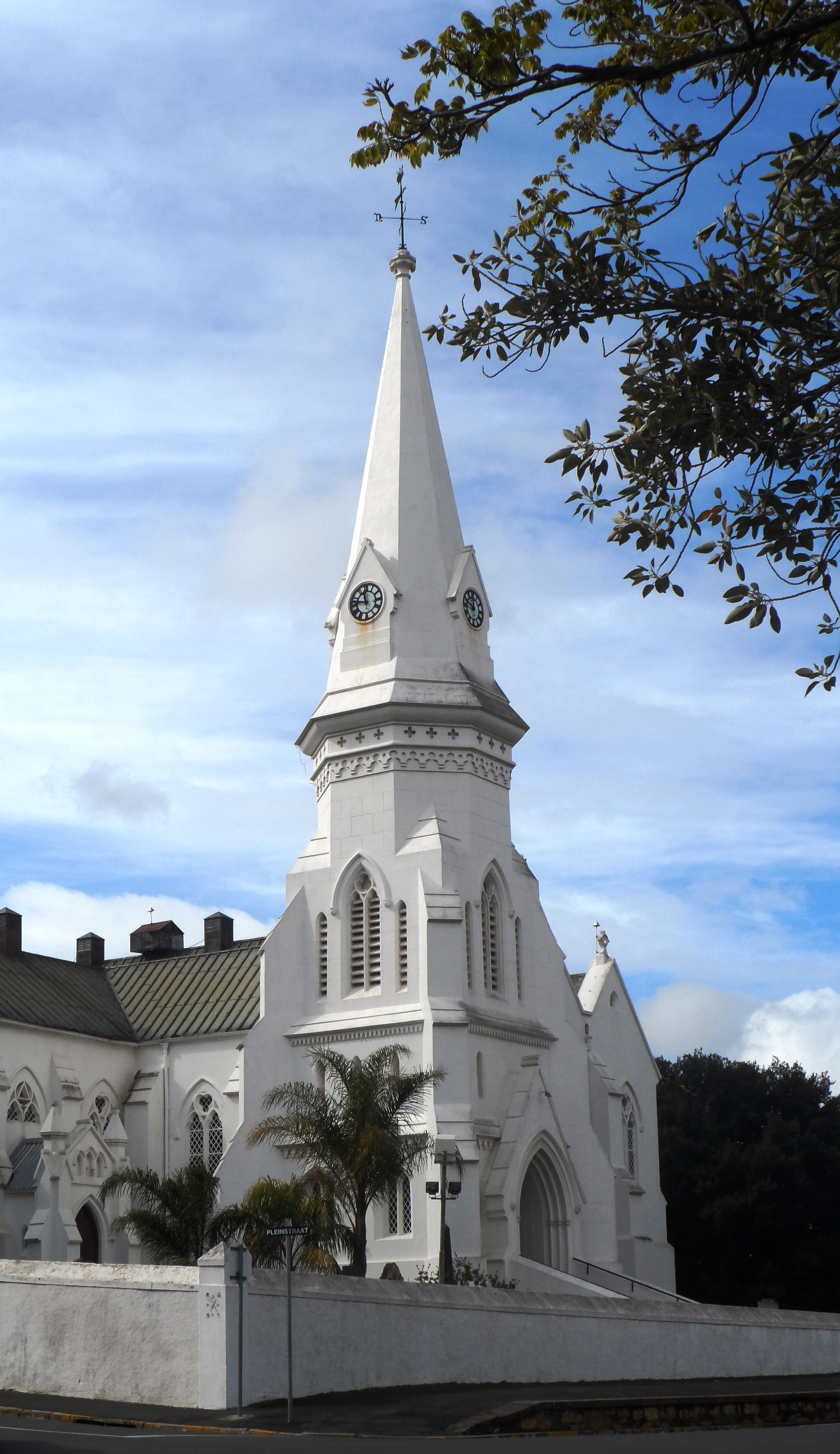
- Dutch Reformed Church
- Location: Malmesbury
- Country: South Africa
- Denomination: Nederduits Gereformeerde Kerk

History
- Founded: 1745

Architecture
- Functional status: Church

The Dutch Reformed Church in Swartland, with its center in the Swartland town of Malmesbury, is the fifth oldest congregation of the Dutch Reformed Church.

== Foundation ==
In 1655 the first whites, namely Jan Wintervogel and six soldiers, entered the Swartland. In 1743, when many farms had already been given out in these parts, Baron Van Imhoff, on an inspection tour of the outer districts, was deeply shocked by the state of religion and civilization. He complained that the inhabitants of Zwartland “looked upon religion little or not at all”. On the recommendation of Baron Van Imhoff, the Swartland congregation was founded as the fifth congregation of the Dutch Reformed Church on 27 June 1745. Then Rev. Franciscus le Seuer (pastor of the Groote Kerk in Cape Town from 1729 to 1746) confirmed the first pastor, Rev. R.A. Weerman, here as a consultant. The congregation had 55 members.

Rev. Weerman began the construction of a church. In 1750 Rev. C.B. Voltelen was confirmed as the second minister and during his five-year stay the rectory and church building were completed. In 1755 Rev. Voltelen and Rev. Croeser of Cape Town exchanged places. After 15 years Rev. Croeser died and was buried in the church under the chair of the reader. Now follows. D. Goldbagh (1774-'83), P.J. van der Spuy (1786–1806), M.C. Vos (1810-'11)

== Ministers ==
- Johan Gregorius Bezuidenhoud, 1962–1965
- Jacobus Adriaan Maass, 28 February 2021 – present
