= Atlantic Aerodrome =

Airport in the Western Cape, South Africa

- IATA: none; ICAO: FAAA

Summary
- Airport type: Private
- Serves: City of Cape Town
- Location: Cape Farm 27-4, City of Cape Town, Western Cape, South Africa
- Opened: September 26, 2026; 15 days' time
- Time zone: South Africa Standard Time (UTC+02:00)
- Elevation AMSL: 73 m (240 ft)
- Coordinates: 33°35′17.5″S 18°37′05.4″E
- Website: atlanticaerodrome.co.za
- Interactive map of Atlantic Aerodrome

Runways
Direction	Length		Surface
Direction	m	ft	Surface
02/20	884	2,900	Grooved asphalt

The Atlantic Aerodrome is a premium private airport just outside of Cape Town, in the Western Cape province of South Africa. Scheduled to open 1 January 2027, the airport was built to facilitate private and charter flights for small to medium aircraft, such as turboprops and light jets.

As of July 2026, the airport is awaiting a license from the Civil Aviation Authority (CAA).

== History ==
In May 2026, the airport's proposal received support from the National Airspace Committee (NASCOM).

In June 2026, it was reported that Lulenco Plant Hire, Exeo Khokela Civil Engineering Construction, and NK Development Solutions had been appointed to the project. The Aerodrome set a Phase 1 opening date of September 2026, which would include core facilities. Phase 2 would then bring about a runway extension, additional hangar capacity, expanded FBO services, and more guest accommodation. The development cost was estimated to be between R400 and 500 million.

In July 2026, it was reported that Phase 2 of the airport's development had been merged into Phase 1. The first phase included an 884-meter runway with taxiways, however this is intended to be upgraded to a 1,250-meter runway in the next phase.

In July 2026, it was reported that the flight school located at Cape Winelands Airport would move to the Atlantic Aerodrome, as the former was preparing to undergo redevelopment into a new international airport.

== Location ==
The Aerodrome is situated on Rondeberg Road, in the Cape Farm region of the City of Cape Town metro. The facility sits just off the N7 freeway, within a farming region, close to Kalbaskraal.

It is located approximately 22 km from Malmesbury, 25 km from the coast at Koeberg Nature Reserve, and 50 km from Cape Town CBD.

The nearest airports to the Aerodrome are Cape Winelands Airport, around 40 km away, and Cape Town International, around 60 km away.

== Features ==
The facility provides hangar leasing, serviced FBO hangarage, a clubhouse, and guest accommodation. It is also the site of two flight schools, with purpose-built hangars, classrooms, and offices. The Aerodrome has set the goal of being rated ACR/PCR (23/F/B/X/T). Facilities include:

- 15 to 60 meter, 450m² to 1,800m² hangar configurations
- Recreational spaces, including a clubhouse with restaurants
- A 852 meter runway, with taxiways
- FA-D200B flying training area
- Business facilities
- 24-hour access
