= Rietbron =

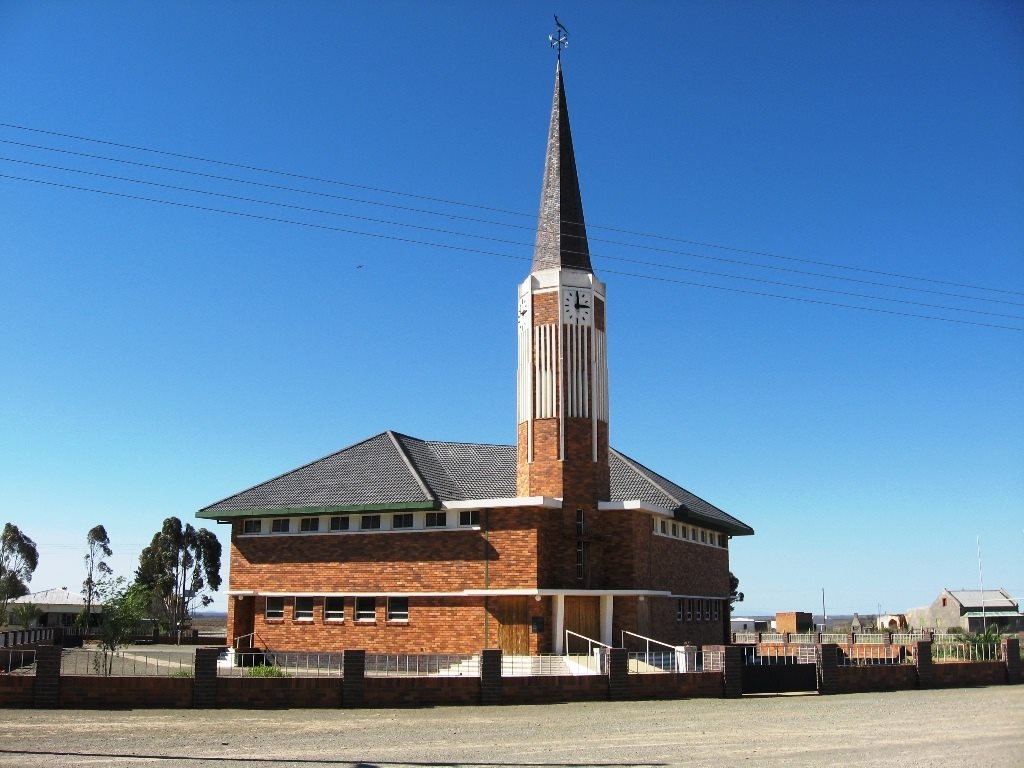
- Dutch Reformed Church Rietbron

- Location within Eastern Cape Location within South Africa
- Coordinates: 32.899°S 23.149°E
- Country: South Africa
- Province: Eastern Cape
- District: Sarah Baartman
- Municipality: Dr Beyers Naudé

Area
  - Total: 18.29 km^{2} (7.06 sq mi)

Population (2011)
  - Total: 1,184
  - Density: 64.73/km^{2} (167.7/sq mi)

Racial makeup (2011)
  - Black African: 7.8%
  - Coloured: 87.6%
  - Indian/Asian: 0.4%
  - White: 3.4%
  - Other: 0.8%

First languages (2011)
  - Afrikaans: 96.3%
  - English: 1.6%
  - Other: 2.1%
- Time zone: UTC+2 (SAST)
- PO box: 6450
- Area code: 044

Rietbron is a town in Sarah Baartman District Municipality in the Eastern Cape province of South Africa. It is on the R306 road.

Village 85 km south-east of Beaufort West and 64 km north-west of Willowmore. The name is Afrikaans and means ‘reed source’, ‘reed fountain’.
