= Malmesbury, South Africa =

Malmesbury
- Town
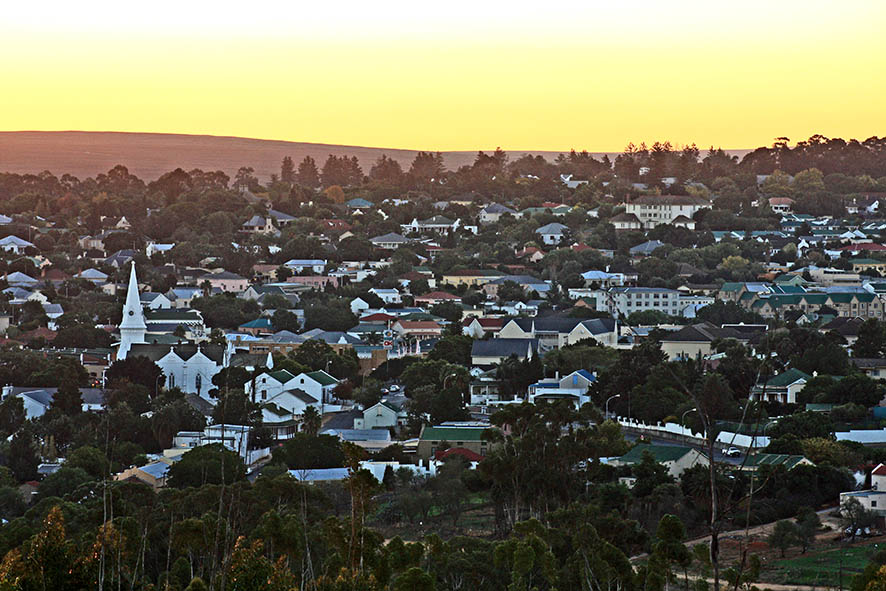
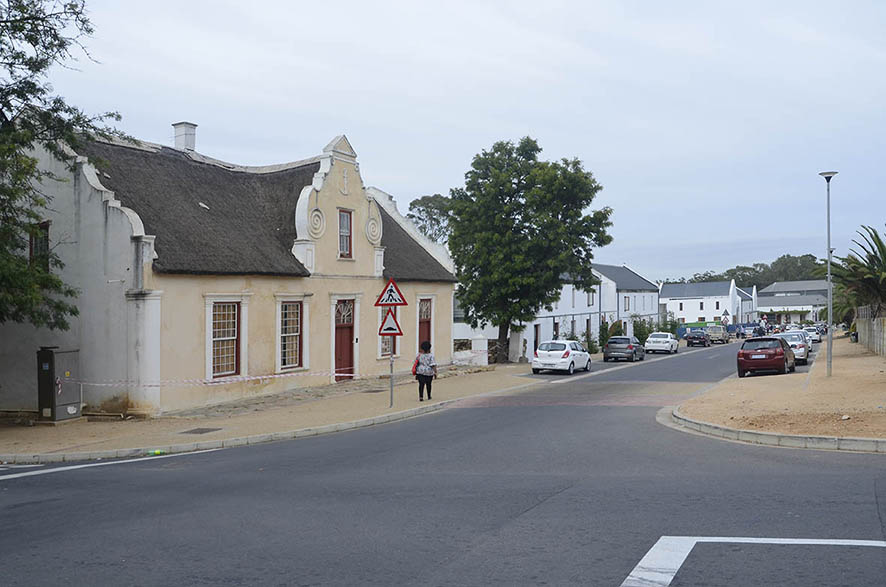
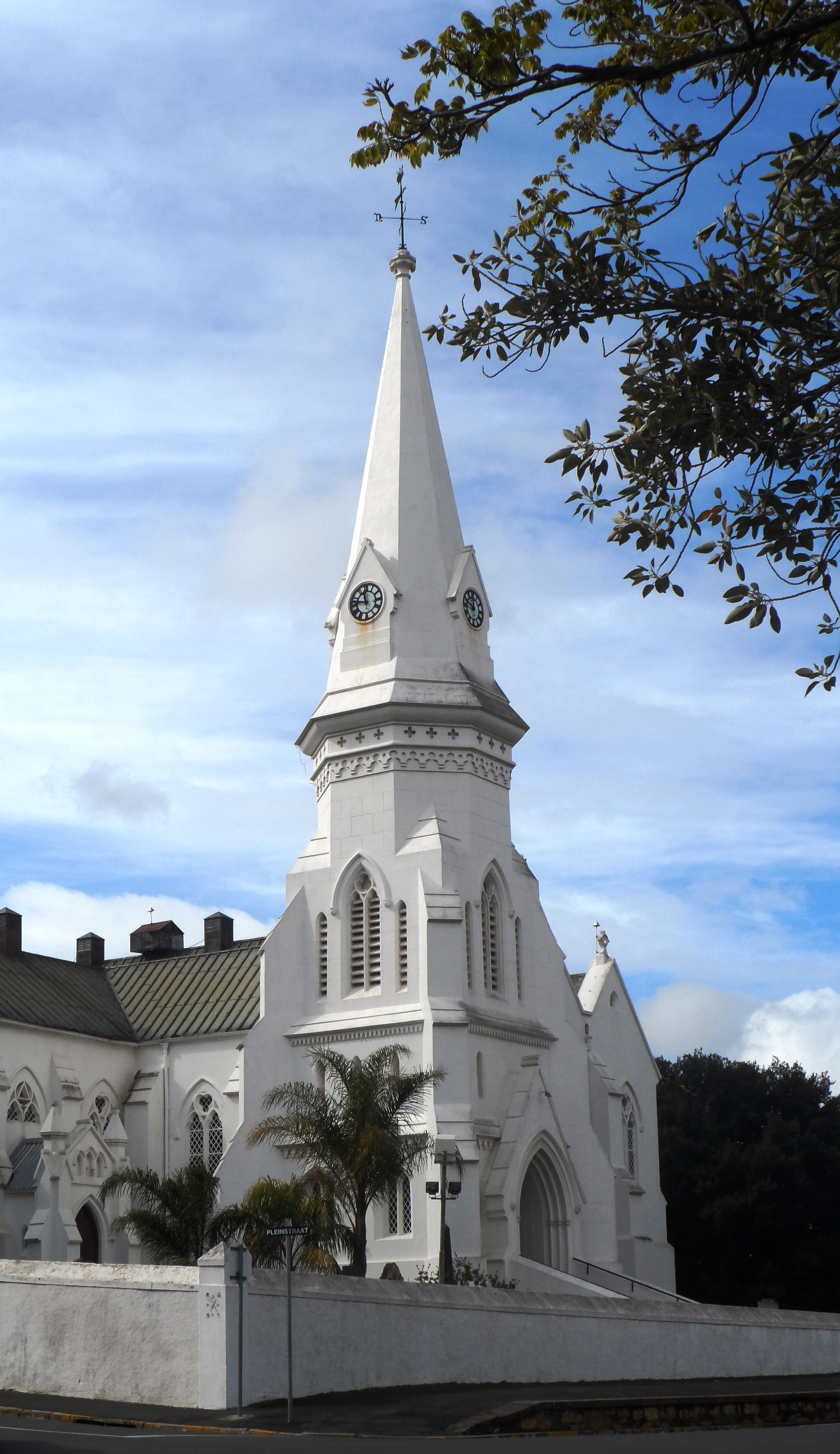
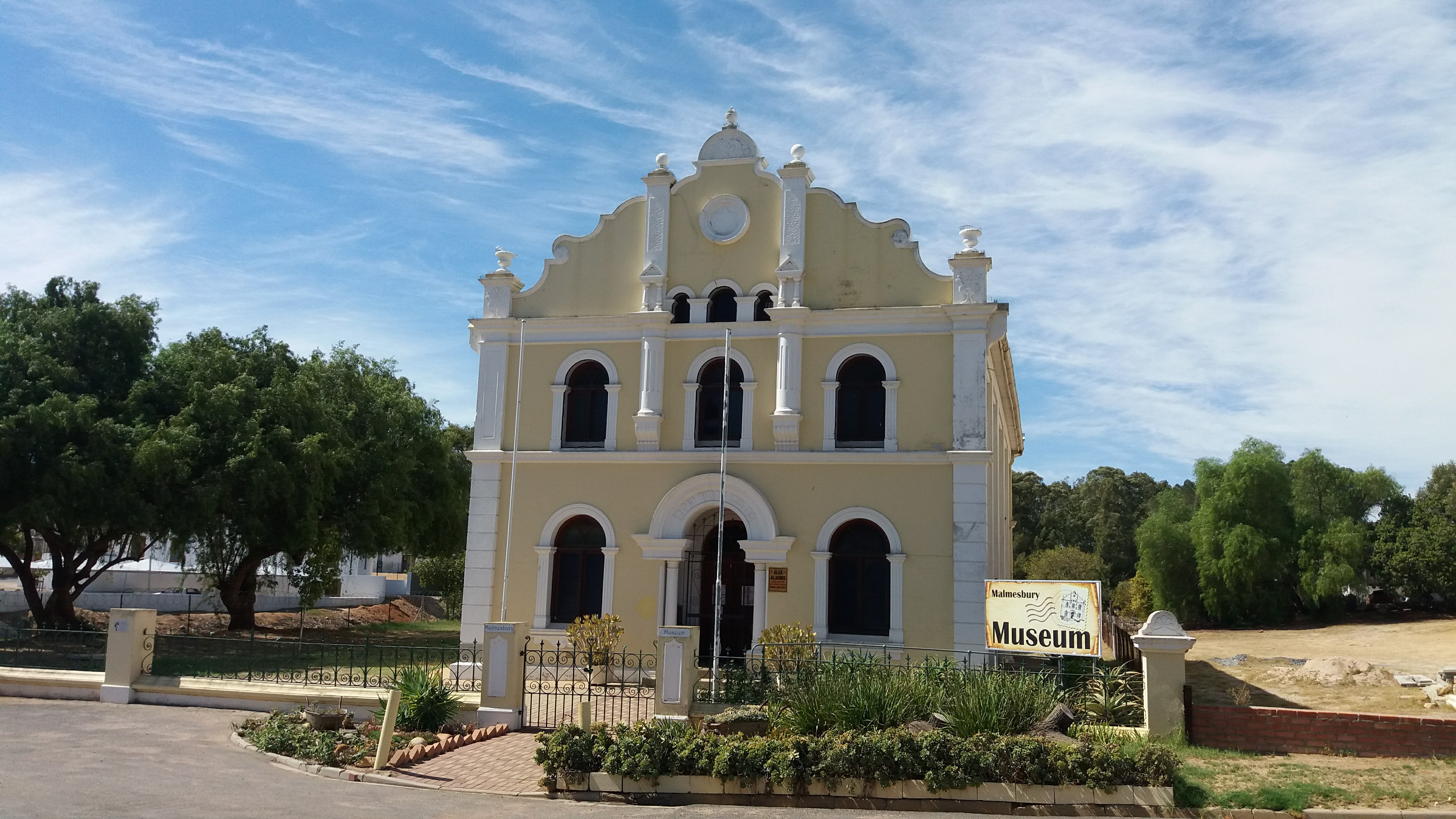
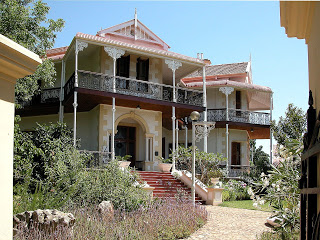
- Top, The Malmesbury skyline at dusk. Middle left, a view down Loedolff Street. Middle right, the Dutch Reformed Church in Malmesbury. Lower left, the Malmesbury Museum. Lower right, the Baron Von Elgg Victorian era home built in 1890, the town has a number of similar surviving Victorian era homes.

- Location within Western Cape Location within South Africa Location within Africa
- Coordinates: 33°27′S 18°44′E
- Country: South Africa
- Province: Western Cape
- District: West Coast
- Municipality: Swartland
- Established: 1745

Area
  - Total: 18.8 km^{2} (7.3 sq mi)

Population (2026)
  - Total: 80,000
  - Density: 4,300/km^{2} (11,000/sq mi)

Racial makeup (2026)
  - Black African: 24.9%
  - Coloured: 55.3%
  - Indian/Asian: 0.5%
  - White: 18.4%
  - Other: 0.9%

First languages (2026)
  - Afrikaans: 73.9%
  - Xhosa: 16.3%
  - English: 3.8%
  - Sotho: 3.1%
  - Other: 2.8%
- Time zone: UTC+2 (SAST)
- Postal code (street): 7300
- PO box: 7299
- Area code: 022

Malmesbury is a town of approximately 80,000 inhabitants in the Western Cape province of South Africa, about 65 km north of Cape Town.

The town is the largest in the Swartland (‘black land’) which took its name from the renosterbos ('rhino bush'), an indigenous plant that turns black in the warm, dry summers. The area is especially known for its grain and wine cultivation as well as sheep and poultry farming.

Malmesbury was named after Sir Lowry Cole's father-in-law, the Earl of Malmesbury. Settlers were encouraged to make their homes here because of a tepid sulphur chloride mineral spring that was renowned for curing rheumatism. The first farms were allocated in 1703. When the fifth Dutch Reformed congregation in the Cape was established here, it became known as Zwartlands-kerk (Swartland Church) but was renamed Malmesbury in 1829. The town acquired municipal status in 1860.

The town no longer attracts the ailing because this aspect was never developed by the local authority, and today a shopping centre is located on top of the site with only a decorative fountain marking the location of the original spring.

== Notable people from Malmesbury ==
- Charné Bosman
- McNeil Hendricks
- Maggie Laubser
- Pieter-Steph du Toit
- Johan du Toit
- Dean Smith
- Marius van Heerden
- Hennie Smit

== Demographics ==
In 1911 the Encyclopædia Britannica recorded the population of the town at 3,811; however, this may refer to a white population, as a census of 1849 recorded a total of 8,520 residents. The 1939 edition of the official statistical Year Book of South Africa records a total population of 4,856, with roughly half the population recorded as white (2,574) and half recorded as coloured (2,221).

The following statistics describing Malmesbury are from the 2011 census.

- Area: 18.8 square kilometres (7.3 sq mi)
- Population: 35,897: 1,909.3 inhabitants per square kilometre (4,945/sq mi)
- Households: 9,473: 503.9 per square kilometre (1,305/sq mi)

Gender	Population	%
Male	18,016	50.2
Female	17,880	49.8

Race	Population	%
Coloured	19,868	55.3
Black African	8,929	24.9
White	6,588	18.4
Indian or Asian	192	0.5
Other	319	0.9

First language	Population	%
Afrikaans	24,564	73.9
isiXhosa	5,433	16.3
English	1,251	3.8
Sesotho	1,044	3.1
Setswana	148	0.4
Sign language	77	0.2
isiZulu	64	0.2
isiNdebele	57	0.2
Xitsonga	26	0.1
Sepedi	22	0.1
Tshivenda	21	0.1
siSwati	18	0.1
Other	511	1.5
Not applicable	2,658	

== Transport ==
=== Rail ===
Malmesbury lies on the main railway line between Kraaifontein and Bitterfontein, and its railway station marks the northern end of Metrorail Western Cape's commuter rail network. Metrorail currently operates services to Cape Town via Kalbaskraal, Klipheuwel, Fisantekraal and Kraaifontein where the Malmesbury line joins the main Northern Line to Cape Town.

=== Road ===
Malmesbury lies along the N7 highway "Cape Namibia Route" which bypasses the town centre to the west and leads north towards Moorreesburg, Piketberg, Springbok and Namibia and south towards Cape Town. The N7 intersects the R315 Bokomo Street, west of the town centre and the R45 interchange, north-west of the town centre.

Malmesbury is also has at the centre of three regional routes including the R45 which passes through the town as "Voortrekker Road", "Loedolf Street" and "Piet Retief Street" from Paarl (south-east) to Vredenburg (north-west), the R302 which passes through the town as "Voortrekker Road" from Durbanville (south), and the R315 which passes through the town as "Bokomo Street" from Darling (north-west). Voortrekker Road, designated as the R45 and R302 serves as Malmesbury's main street through the town.

== Coats of arms ==
Municipality — Malmesbury was a municipality in its own right from 1860 to 2000. By 1931, the council had adopted an emblem depicting a plough in front of a sheaf of wheat, surrounded by a buckled strap inscribed Deo frumentoque vires. This device was depicted on a cigarette card issued in 1931.

In 1963, the council assumed a coat of arms, designed by Cornelis Pama. It registered the arms with the Cape Provincial Administration in December 1963, had them formally granted by the provincial administrator on 8 July 1966 and registered them at the Bureau of Heraldry in September 1969.

The arms were : Per chevron Sable and Gules, a chevron ermine between in chief two garbs and in base a sea-lion Or. In layman's terms : the shield was divided by an ermine chevron, the upper half displaying two golden sheaves of wheat on a black background and the lower half a golden heraldic sea-lion on a red background. The sea-lion was evidently derived from the arms of Gustaaf Willem van Imhoff, who established the church from which the town developed.

The crest was an upright spade between two rhenosterbos branches, and the motto, once again, was Deo frumentoque vires.

Divisional council — The Malmesbury divisional council, which administered the rural areas of the district outside the town, assumed a coat of arms, designed by Ivan Mitford-Barberton, on 24 June 1958.

The arms were : Per fess Sable and Azure, a fess wavy Gules fimbriated Argent between in chief an eagle displayed between two ears of wheat palewise Or and in base a sea-lion naiant per pale Or and Argent. In layman's terms : the shield was divided horizontally into black and blue and displayed, from top to bottom, a golden eagle between two sheaves of wheat, a red wavy stripe edged in silver, and a gold and silver heraldic sea-lion.

== Sport ==
Mother City SkyDiving operates out of a private airfield 12 km to the north of Malmesbury and provides a service for experienced sport skydivers, and offers Tandem Introductory Skydiving.

Malmesbury has a variety of Sports Facilities including a Golf, Rugby & Bowling Club. The international organisation Parkrun hosts a regular 5 km run for anyone to join for free.

== Climate ==
Climate data for Malmesbury, elevation 102 m (335 ft), (1991–2020 normals, extremes 1998–2023)
Month	Jan	Feb	Mar	Apr	May	Jun	Jul	Aug	Sep	Oct	Nov	Dec	Year
Record high °C (°F)	44.1 (111.4)	43.8 (110.8)	42.7 (108.9)	40.8 (105.4)	34.6 (94.3)	31.0 (87.8)	31.0 (87.8)	30.4 (86.7)	38.2 (100.8)	41.8 (107.2)	41.7 (107.1)	44.8 (112.6)	44.8 (112.6)
Mean daily maximum °C (°F)	32.9 (91.2)	33.6 (92.5)	31.3 (88.3)	28.3 (82.9)	24.1 (75.4)	20.6 (69.1)	20.2 (68.4)	20.4 (68.7)	22.4 (72.3)	27.0 (80.6)	28.8 (83.8)	31.2 (88.2)	26.7 (80.1)
Daily mean °C (°F)	24.1 (75.4)	24.5 (76.1)	22.5 (72.5)	19.7 (67.5)	16.7 (62.1)	13.6 (56.5)	13.0 (55.4)	13.3 (55.9)	14.9 (58.8)	18.4 (65.1)	20.2 (68.4)	22.5 (72.5)	18.6 (65.5)
Mean daily minimum °C (°F)	15.3 (59.5)	15.4 (59.7)	13.7 (56.7)	11.0 (51.8)	9.2 (48.6)	6.7 (44.1)	5.8 (42.4)	6.2 (43.2)	7.4 (45.3)	9.8 (49.6)	11.8 (53.2)	13.9 (57.0)	10.5 (50.9)
Record low °C (°F)	7.1 (44.8)	5.0 (41.0)	6.3 (43.3)	1.3 (34.3)	0.2 (32.4)	0.0 (32.0)	−2.4 (27.7)	−0.3 (31.5)	0.4 (32.7)	1.7 (35.1)	3.3 (37.9)	7.8 (46.0)	−2.4 (27.7)
Average precipitation mm (inches)	10.0 (0.39)	10.6 (0.42)	15.2 (0.60)	37.0 (1.46)	65.8 (2.59)	77.9 (3.07)	71.8 (2.83)	64.1 (2.52)	44.8 (1.76)	29.0 (1.14)	17.5 (0.69)	12.9 (0.51)	456.6 (17.98)
Average precipitation days (≥ 0.25 mm)	1.8	1.8	2.4	5.0	7.7	8.7	8.8	8.2	6.4	4.6	2.9	2.4	60.7
Source: Starlings Roost Weather
