= R313 (South Africa) =

Regional route in South Africa

Regional route R313
- R313 route map

Route information
- Length: 110 km (68 mi)

Major junctions
- North end: N8 near Griekwastad
- South end: R357 in Prieska

Location
- Country: South Africa

Highway system
- Numbered routes of South Africa
← R312	→ R315

The R313 is a Regional Route in South Africa that connects Prieska with the N8 between Griekwastad and Groblershoop via Niekerkshoop.

== Route ==
The R313 begins at a junction with the N8 national route approximately 16 kilometres west of Griekwastad. It heads south for 110 kilometres, through Niekerkshoop, to cross the Orange River and reach its end at a junction with the R357 route in Prieska.
