= Siyathemba Local Municipality =

Siyathemba
- Local municipality
- Seal

- Location in the Northern Cape
- Coordinates: 29°40′S 22°40′E
- Country: South Africa
- Province: Northern Cape
- District: Pixley ka Seme
- Seat: Prieska
- Wards: 6

Government
  - Type: Municipal council
  - Mayor: Andrew Phillips

Area
  - Total: 14,725 km^{2} (5,685 sq mi)

Population (2022)
  - Total: 27,102
  - Density: 1.8405/km^{2} (4.7670/sq mi)

Racial makeup (2022)
  - Black African: 19.7%
  - Coloured: 69.2%
  - Indian/Asian: 1.1%
  - White: 9.9%

First languages (2011)
  - Afrikaans: 93.7%
  - Xhosa: 3.1%
  - Other: 3.2%
- Time zone: UTC+2 (SAST)
- Municipal code: NC077

Siyathemba Municipality (Afrikaans: Siyathemba Munisipaliteit) is a local municipality within the Pixley ka Seme District Municipality, in the Northern Cape province of South Africa.

== Main places ==
The 2001 census divided the municipality into the following main places:

Place	Code	Area (km^{2})	Population	Most spoken language
E'Thembeni	31301	2.14	3,073	Afrikaans
Marydale	31302	75.11	2,080	Afrikaans
Niekerkshoop	31303	31.01	2,001	Afrikaans
Prieska	31304	194.25	8,447	Afrikaans
Westerberg	31306	10.41	0	-
Remainder of the municipality	31305	7,938.90	1,920	Afrikaans

== Politics ==
The municipal council consists of eleven members elected by mixed-member proportional representation. Six councillors are elected by first-past-the-post voting in five wards, while the remaining five are chosen from party lists so that the total number of party representatives is proportional to the number of votes received. In the election of 1 November 2021 no party obtained a majority of seats on the council. The following table shows the results of the election.

Siyathemba local election, 1 November 2021
Party	Votes				Seats		
Party	Ward	List	Total	%	Ward	List	Total
African National Congress	3,289	3,310	6,599	44.4%	5	0	5
Siyathemba Community Movement	2,959	2,937	5,896	39.7%	1	3	4
Democratic Alliance	950	942	1,892	12.7%	0	2	2
Freedom Front Plus	200	221	421	2.8%	0	0	0
Economic Freedom Fighters	27	27	54	0.4%	0	0	0
Total	7,425	7,437	14,862		6	5	11
Valid votes	7,425	7,437	14,862	98.8%			
Spoilt votes	91	94	185	1.2%			
Total votes cast	7,516	7,531	15,047				
Voter turnout	7,539						
Registered voters	12,434						
Turnout percentage	60.6%						
