= Niekerkshoop =

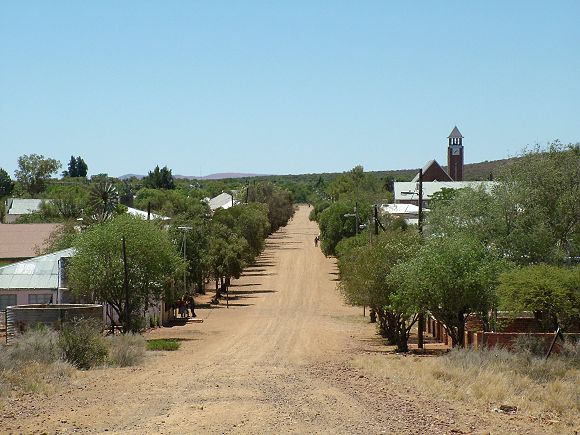
- Niekerkshoop

- Location within Northern Cape Location within South Africa
- Coordinates: 29°19′36″S 22°50′13″E
- Country: South Africa
- Province: Northern Cape
- District: Pixley ka Seme
- Municipality: Siyathemba

Area
  - Total: 31.01 km^{2} (11.97 sq mi)

Population (2011)
  - Total: 1,830
  - Density: 59.0/km^{2} (153/sq mi)

Racial makeup (2011)
  - Black African: 6.6%
  - Coloured: 91.9%
  - Indian/Asian: 0.3%
  - White: 0.8%
  - Other: 0.4%

First languages (2011)
  - Afrikaans: 95.8%
  - Tswana: 1.4%
  - Other: 2.8%
- Time zone: UTC+2 (SAST)
- Postal code (street): 8930
- PO box: 8930
- Area code: 053

Niekerkshoop is a town in Pixley ka Seme District Municipality in the Northern Cape province of South Africa.

Village and asbestos mining centre 80 kilometres (50 mi) south of Griquatown and 40 kilometres (25 mi) north of Prieska. It was laid out on the farm Modderfontein in 1902 and has been administered by a village management board since 1904. Named after the owners of the farm, brothers named Van Niekerk.
