= Prince Alfred Hamlet =

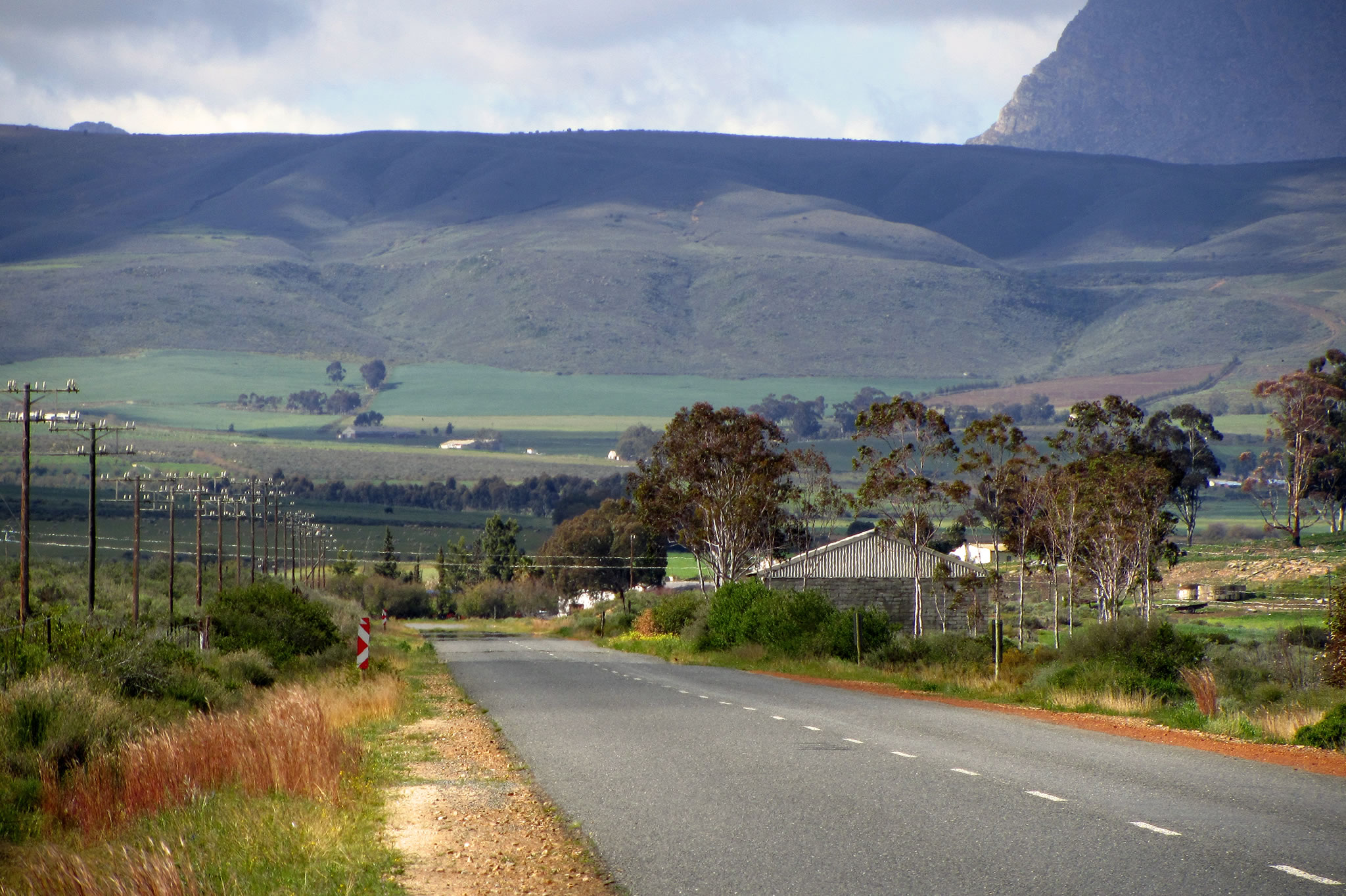
- Prince Alfred Hamlet

- Location within Western Cape Location within South Africa
- Coordinates: 33°17′24″S 19°19′38″E
- Country: South Africa
- Province: Western Cape
- District: Cape Winelands
- Municipality: Witzenberg
- Named for: Prince Alfred

Government
  - Councillor: Ronald Visagie (DA)

Area
  - Total: 8.73 km^{2} (3.37 sq mi)
- Elevation: 520 m (1,710 ft)

Population (2011)
  - Total: 6,810
  - Density: 780/km^{2} (2,020/sq mi)

Racial makeup (2011)
  - Black African: 13.5%
  - Coloured: 72.4%
  - Indian/Asian: 0.1%
  - White: 13.0%
  - Other: 1.0%

First languages (2011)
  - Afrikaans: 86.8%
  - Xhosa: 6.6%
  - Sotho: 3.8%
  - English: 1.7%
  - Other: 1.1%
- Time zone: UTC+2 (SAST)
- Postal code (street): 6835
- PO box: 6840
- Area code: 023

Prince Alfred Hamlet is a small town in the Western Cape province of South Africa.

It was founded by Johannes Cornelis Goosen, who was born in the Klein Drakenstein and came to the Warm Bokkeveld as a young farmer.

In March 1851 Goosen bought the farm Wagenbooms Rivier from George Sebastiaan Wolfaardt at the “fantastic” price of £6 000. Ten years later he measured out first 80 and then another 10 plots and sold them for £6 000 each. These plots had water rights and each owner also received one morgen or 0.856 hectares (2.12 acres) of land to cultivate in the Bakoven River to grow feed for their animals.

While Goosen was busy measuring out his plots, Queen Victoria's son Prince Alfred visited the Cape Colony. Goosen decided to name the new town after the Prince and so the name Prince Alfred Hamlet was born.

In 1861 the first school was established with 42 pupils under the tutorship of Master Strobos. The building, a temporary construction, was known as the “House on Sticks”. In 1871 the “House on Sticks” was demolished when a permanent building became available. It was also used as the church.

In 1906 the Prince Alfred Hamlet members of the Ceres Dutch Reformed Church decided to build their own church. D.G. Roux laid the cornerstone on 5 May 1906. Each member had to help by donating a delivery of the stones and each family bought its own pew. In 1926 a parsonage was built so that a full-time minister could be appointed to serve this congregation. On 5 November 1954 they broke away from Ceres “Mother” Church and Rev. I.B. Fourie took up the position of minister of the independent parish. On 25 April 1964 Fourie laid the cornerstone of the new church. The new building was opened on 14 and 15 November and the old building was converted into a hall.

A Dutch Reformed Mission Church, i.e. a separate church for Coloured people, was established in 1965 and a church was built. The first minister was J. Marais. This church, as well as many other old houses, did not survive the earthquake of 1969.

On 10 April 1929 Prince Alfred Hamlet got its own train station. The Minister of Railways, W.C. Malan, applied the last bolt to the line before the train, filled with school children, left Ceres for the ceremony at Hamlet.

A Town Council was inaugurated on 8 December 1874 and on 28 December 1910 the town was given the status of Municipality under the Municipality Law of 1882. In 1926 a Town Hall was built and in 1979 the offices next to it were added. The Hamlet Country Hotel is the oldest business still in operation. Part of the building was constructed in the 19th century and since 1940 the Kahn family has run it.
