= Fisantekraal =

Suburb of Cape Town, South Africa

- Location within Western Cape Location within South Africa
- Coordinates: 33.785°S 18.715°E
- Country: South Africa
- Province: Western Cape
- Municipality: City of Cape Town

Government
  - Councilor: Justin Adriaan Basson (Democratic Alliance)

Area
  - Total: 0.65 km^{2} (0.25 sq mi)

Population (2011)
  - Total: 12,369
  - Density: 19,000/km^{2} (49,000/sq mi)

Racial makeup (2011)
  - Black African: 51.5%
  - Coloured: 46.9%
  - Indian/Asian: 0.3%
  - White: 0.5%
  - Other: 0.8%

First languages (2011)
  - Afrikaans: 50.1%
  - Xhosa: 39.6%
  - Sotho: 4.8%
  - English: 2.8%
  - Other: 2.8%
- Time zone: UTC+2 (SAST)
- Postal code (street): 7550
- PO box: 7552

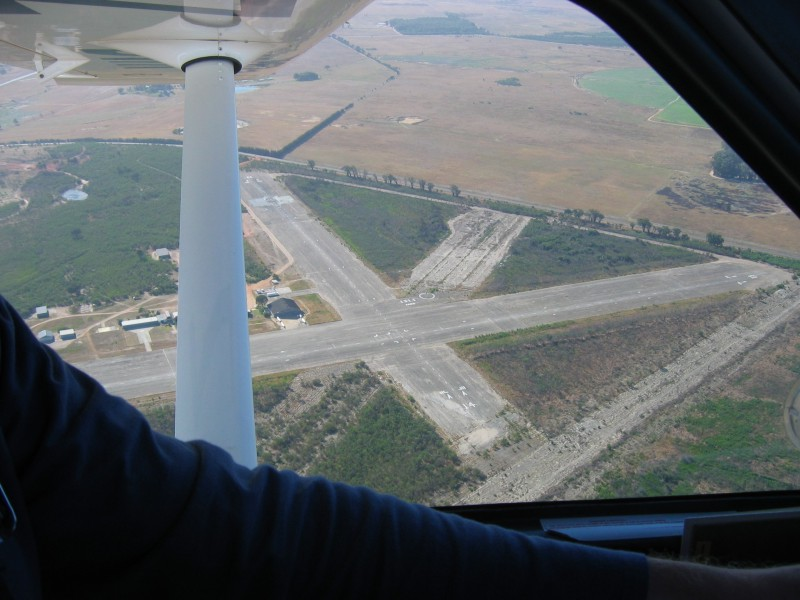
Aerial view of Cape Winelands Airport, is located near Fisantekraal

Fisantekraal is a suburb of the city of Cape Town, South Africa. It is located 10 kilometres (6 mi) northeast of Durbanville and about 40 kilometres (20 mi) northeast of Cape Town CBD.

== Demographics ==
According to the 2011 census it has a population of 12,369 people.

== Facilities ==
Groot Phesantekraal View, a major shopping center, opened nearby in 2025.

The private Cape Winelands Airport (formerly Fisantekraal Airfield) is situated close to Fisantekraal, and is being developed into Cape Town's second international airport.
