= Mamre, South Africa =

Rural village in the Western Cape, South Africa

Mamre
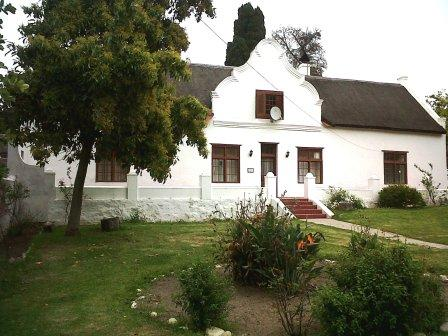
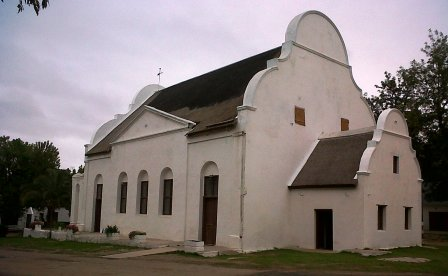
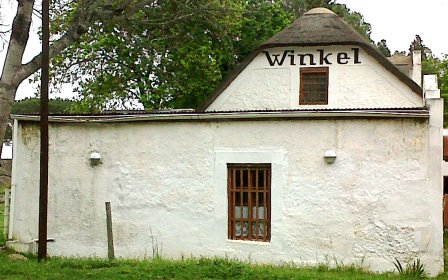
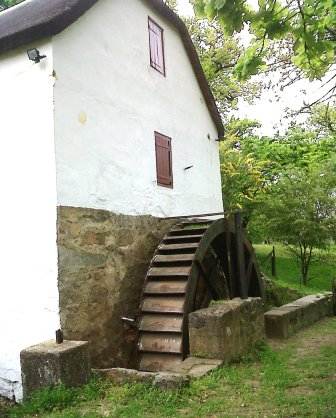
- Clockwise from Top: De Kleine Post in Mamre, Moravian Mission Church, Mamre Mill, Traditional shop in Mamre.

- Location within Western Cape Location within South Africa
- Coordinates: 33.517°S 18.467°E
- Country: South Africa
- Province: Western Cape
- Municipality: City of Cape Town

Area
  - Total: 1.87 km^{2} (0.72 sq mi)

Population (2011)
  - Total: 9,048
  - Density: 4,840/km^{2} (12,500/sq mi)

Racial makeup (2011)
  - Black African: 3.0%
  - Coloured: 94.6%
  - Indian/Asian: 0.3%
  - White: 0.3%
  - Other: 1.8%

First languages (2011)
  - Afrikaans: 92.3%
  - English: 6.0%
  - Other: 1.6%
- Time zone: UTC+2 (SAST)
- Postal code (street): 7349
- PO box: 7347

Mamre is a small rural town in the Western Cape province of South Africa. It is situated on the northernmost border of the City of Cape Town Metropolitan Municipality. It is situated approximately 55 kilometres (30 mi) north of Cape Town, and 5–6 km to the neighbouring industrial town of Atlantis.

== History ==
Mamre was established as a village and mission station in 1808 by Moravian missionaries. It was at first known as Groene Kloof (Green Gorge) after the Dutch East India Company post was established there in 1701 and abandoned in 1791. It was subsequently renamed after the biblical Mamre (Gen. 13:18), a name said to mean "fattiness".

In December 1962, Looksmart Ngudle and Denis Goldberg helped to organise an Umkhonto we Sizwe training camp at Mamre, later recognised as the first MK training centre inside South Africa; however, it had to be abandoned early due to Security Police interest.
