= Cape Winelands Airport =

Airport in the Western Cape, South Africa

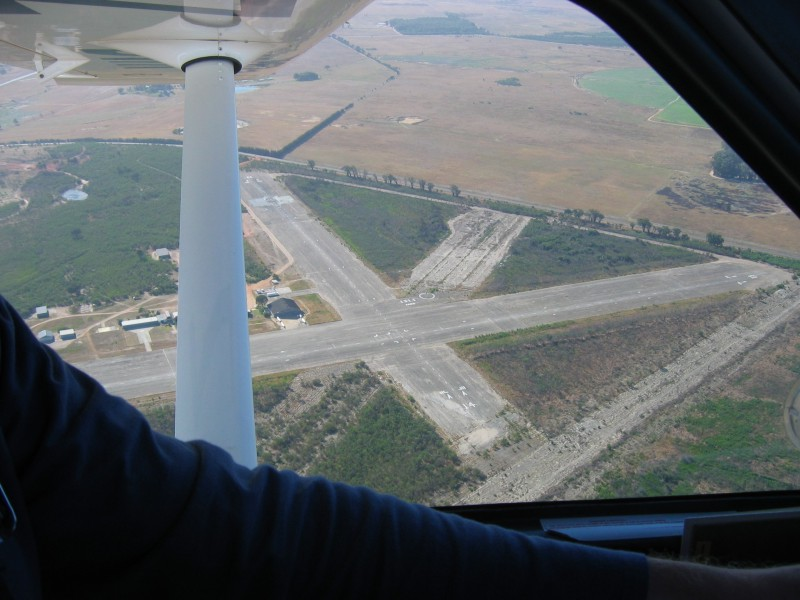
- Cape Winelands Airport as viewed from the north and 1600 ft AGL

- Artist's render of the proposed CWA redevelopment, which will serve as Cape Town's second commercial (and first private) airport
- IATA: none; ICAO: FAWN

Summary
- Airport type: Private
- Owner: Rob Hersov
- Operator: Cape Winelands Airport
- Serves: The City of Cape Town
- Location: Lichtenburg Road, 13 km (8.1 mi) NE of Durbanville, Western Cape
- Opened: 1943; 83 years ago Redeveloped airport opening scheduled for 2028; 2 years' time
- Time zone: (UTC+02:00)
- Elevation AMSL: 400 ft (120 m)
- Coordinates: 33°46′10″S 18°44′00″E
- Website: capewinelands.aero

Map
- Location within the Western Cape

Runways
Direction	Length		Surface
Direction	m	ft	Surface
05/23	900	2,952	Concrete
14/32	700	2,296	Concrete
- Lights are available on request from CTFTC. The Cape Talk Radio AM transmission mast is located 5 NM north of FAWN on frequency 567 kHz. Magic Radio 828 kHz is 8 NM NNE of the field. Both can be used for ADF training.

Cape Winelands Airport (CWA) is a privately-owned Category 1 airfield located in the City of Cape Town metro, in South Africa.

It is situated approximately 13 kilometres (8.1 mi) northeast of the town of Durbanville, in the Northern Suburbs, and currently serves as a general flying airfield, used for flight, circuit, and emergency training, as well as for private flights to and from the Cape Winelands region. As of 2025, only 2 of the original 4 runways are still in use - 05/23 and 14/32.

The airport is in the planning phases for redevelopment, and is set to serve as Cape Town's second international airport on completion, with a goal of accommodating over 5 million passengers annually by 2050. The project is being driven by RSA.aero, a consortium of aviation industry veterans.

As of Q2 2026, operating partners for the airport have been secured, and an Environmental Authorization (EA) has been obtained from the Western Cape Government. South African architects Boogertman + Partners have been appointed to design the new airport, and will work with German airport infrastructure development company amd.sigma.

== History ==
The airport was built in its original form in 1943, on a 150 ha site, for use by the South African Air Force. Originally called Fisantekraal Airport, it had 4 runways.

The airfield was transferred to the local municipality in the 1960s, and it was sold to a private owner in 1993.

=== Redevelopment ===
In 2021, South African billionaire Rob Hersov announced his intention to buy the airport and turn it into a secondary aviation hub for Cape Town, focusing on local flights.

In September 2025, the Managing Director of Cape Winelands Airport, Deon Cloete (former General Manager of Cape Town International Airport), stated that adding a second airport to an international city like Cape Town would increase global competitiveness. He further said that adding increased aviation capacity would provide for continued flights if one airport were to close temporarily.

In October 2025, South Africa's largest real estate investment trust (REIT), Growthpoint Properties, became an investment, development, and managing partner of Cape Winelands Airport. Growthpoint made an initial, undisclosed investment in the project, and holds the right to future investments.

Under the agreement, Growthpoint assumed long-term property and asset management responsibilities across the 450-ha aviation precinct’s logistics, commercial, and hospitality components (which excludes the terminal buildings), and has the right of first refusal to co-invest in future property developments. Furthermore, Growthpoint will oversee the development’s main contractor to ensure delivery of the project.

For its part, the Cape Winelands Airport team will lead aviation strategy and master planning of the international aviation hub.

In November 2025, it was reported that the airport had secured Environmental Authorization (EA) from the Western Cape Government.

In December 2025, it was announced that WBHO, South Africa's largest construction company, had been selected to build Cape Winelands Airport. The airport's MD, Deon Cloete, stated that with the construction contractor having been selected, the project had reached a significant milestone, and could move into the detailed technical development and planning phase. Thus, Cloete said the airport's team would begin developing the specific designs and engineering frameworks required to move the project toward construction readiness.

In May 2026, five appeal cases attempting to revoke the airport's Environmental Authorization were dismissed by the Western Cape Government. This followed a public participation process involving 1,500 registered interested parties. The beginning of construction of the airport is planned for late 2026 or early 2027.

In June 2026, it was reported that the CWA's redevelopment was on track. The City of Cape Town Municipal Planning Tribunal had approved the site's rezoning, comprising approximately 350,000 sqm of total bulk, subject to an appeal process. CWA had also already been awarded Strategic Integrated Project (SIP) 17 status by Infrastructure South Africa. The status means that government is obliged prioritize the airport's approvals, licenses, authorizations, and exemptions, as per the Infrastructure Development Act of 2014.

In July 2026, it was reported that the flight school at Cape Winelands Airport would move to the new Atlantic Aerodrome, located along the N7 freeway, near Kalbaskraal. The Aerodrome, scheduled to open in late September 2026, is a private airfield intended to serve as an aviation hub for small aircraft. It will offer chartered flights for small aircraft, up to and including light jets.

That same month, it was confirmed that development partner Growthpoint Properties had recently entered into a cooperation agreement with Stellenbosch University. The partnership was aimed at advancing innovation under the themes of "smart" and "green" development. Its stated mission was to align academic research, industry expertise, and infrastructure development, to address real-world problems. Furthermore, the agreement had a specific focus on engineering collaboration.

== Location ==
Cape Winelands Airport is located in the Northern Suburbs region of the City of Cape Town, northeast of Durbanville and west of Paarl. The airport is situated approximately 39 km from Cape Town International Airport, 43 km from Cape Town, 24 km from Stellenbosch and 30 km from Paarl.

The airport's entrance is on the R312 road (Lichtenburg Road), and the nearest major route towards Cape Town and Paarl is the N1 freeway. Its location is considerably more rural than Cape Town International, which is situated in urban Cape Town, closer to the CBD and most major tourist attractions.

== Aerodrome and airspace information ==
Cape Winelands Airport airspace is uncontrolled Class G and has its own radio frequency of 131.1 MHz. Broadcasts are addressed to Winelands Traffic. Joining altitude is restricted to 2000 ft AMSL by the Cape Town TMA sector A overhead. The Cape Town CTR is approximately 3.5 NM southwest of the field.

Circuits are all flown at 1200 ft AMSL for aeroplanes and helicopters, and 900 ft AMSL for microlights. All turns are made to the left. The circuit is restricted to a 2.5 nm radius from the centre of the airfield.

Avgas 100LL fuel and W100 oil are available.

The airport charges landing fees depending on aircraft mass, and provides paid in-hangar and outdoor aircraft parking.

== Other information ==
Magnetic variation is approx 23° W near Cape Winelands Airport. There are tall mountain ranges to the southeast of the field extending to 6600 ft AMSL. The prevailing wind is southeasterly in summer and northwesterly in winter. Summer temperatures can reach 40 °C, resulting in a maximum density altitude of about 3200 ft. The general flying areas nearby are FAD200 about 10 minutes to the northwest on 124.4 MHz, and FAD69 about five minutes to the north on 124.2 MHz.

As of August 2017, the largest aircraft to have landed at Cape Winelands Airport was a Lockheed C-130 Hercules 5X-UCF, making several landings. Advertisements and movies have also been filmed on location at Cape Winelands Airport.

== Operators ==
As of February 2026, the tenants at CWA are:

- Aerosport Training, Hire, & Maintenance
- Air Du Cap
- Cape Town Flight Training Center
- Diepkloof Aircraft Maintenance
- Helivate
- Sky Messaging
- Wagtail Aviation

== Trivia ==
- The Lockheed C-130 Hercules, Call sign 5X-UCF, was flown in as part of The Red Sea Diving Resort (2018) movie that was filmed on location.

== Planned developments ==
There are plans to convert the Cape Winelands Airport into an international airport, which will make it the second international airport in the City of Cape Town Metropolitan Municipality. The Airport aims to ease congestion at Cape Town International and provide insurers/airlines with a closer alternate for fuel planning, potentially cutting required reserve fuel on inbound flights. The airport improvement program is planned to be done in an 18 to 24 month period, starting within the last few months of 2025, with the commissioning planned for early 2028.

With a Phase 1 investment of around R8 billion, plans include the completion of a 3.5 km (2.2 mi) runway, the setting up of a warehousing facility and the building of a passenger terminal that can accommodate 5.2 million passengers yearly.

Phase 1 is part of a broader, multi-year precinct development, which is set to cost around R16 to R20 billion, and include industrial, retail, office, logistics, and hospitality properties. The project is positioned to create around 35,000 direct and indirect jobs during construction, increasing to over 100,000 over the first 20 years of operation.

The airport will also add 110,000 tons of air-cargo capacity to the region, which equates to 25% of all air cargo entering South Africa in 2025. The new airport aims to have around a quarter share of the 10 million additional passengers that Cape Town is projected to receive by 2050. By working in tandem with Cape Town International, the new airport will save the industry 22 million liters of fuel a year, removing about 60 million kilograms of annual carbon emissions.

In terms of sustainability, CWA has set the goal of becoming the greenest airport in the world, integrating renewable energy sources, off-grid water recycling, and a fynbos nature reserve into its design.
