= Atlantis, South Africa =

Suburb of Cape Town, in the Western Cape, South Africa

Atlantis
- Location within Western Cape Location within South Africa
- Coordinates: 33°34′S 18°29′E
- Country: South Africa
- Province: Western Cape
- Municipality: City of Cape Town

Area
  - Total: 28.84 km^{2} (11.14 sq mi)

Population (2011)
  - Total: 67,491
  - Density: 2,340/km^{2} (6,061/sq mi)

Racial makeup (2011)
  - Black African: 12.9%
  - Coloured: 85.0%
  - Indian/Asian: 0.4%
  - White: 0.1%
  - Other: 1.6%

First languages (2011)
  - Afrikaans: 79.5%
  - English: 9.4%
  - Xhosa: 7.7%
  - Other: 3.4%
- Time zone: UTC+2 (SAST)
- Postal code (street): 7349
- Area code: 021

Atlantis is a town in the Western Cape province of South Africa. It is 40 km (25 mi) north of Cape Town. As of 2024, it has approximately 90,207 residents. Major challenges in the area include unemployment, lack of housing, and crime.

== History ==
=== Establishment ===
The suburb of Atlantis was established by the South African apartheid government during the 1970s for the Coloured population of Cape Town under the Group Areas Act.

In order to attract industry and residents to Atlantis, the government introduced various incentives to attract manufacturing firms via relocation tax credits. In its heyday in the early to mid-1980s, there were approximately 50 industrialists in Atlantis employing people from nearly 8,000 households. These industries included large manufacturing companies such as Tedelex and Atlantis Diesel Engines.

=== Economic decline ===
From the mid-1980s onward, manufacturing activities in Atlantis declined with the termination of incentive programs and defense manufacturing contracts. The lack of incentives significantly reduced the attractiveness of the area. While Atlantis has since been through a series of mini economic booms and busts, the area's general economic trend has been of decline.

Currently, only about 3% of Atlantis' original companies still have business the area.

=== Revitalization efforts ===
Numerous new factories and businesses have started to operate in Atlantis. In the twenty-first century, over a billion rand has been invested into Atlantis by large multinationals. Currently, there are 94 factories and 77 services businesses in Atlantis.

Over 600 million rand has been invested by the green manufacturing industry to create wind towers, wind tower internals, and solar panels, among other goods. The investment is the result of cooperation between the City of Cape Town, the Western Cape Government, the South African Department of Trade and Industry, and GreenCape.

In 2013, the City of Cape Town, in cooperation with the Western Cape Provincial Government, declared Atlantis as a priority area for economic development, establishing a Greentech hub for manufacturing of components for the renewable energy and other green industries. Also in 2013, an application was submitted for the Atlantis Industrial Area to be declared a special economic zone (SEZ), with a focus on green technology. The SEZ status would provide investors a range of incentives such as co-location and access to established markets.

In the same year, Hisense opened a factory in the town in June, thus injecting 350 million rand into the first phase of the Atlantis plant, creating 300 production positions, and introducing a skills transfer program led by technicians and engineers from China.

There have been a range of other interventions to revitalize the local economy:

- Upgrading of infrastructure, such as the electricity supply, improved public transport system (MyCiti Bus System), installation of a fiber optic network to improve the broad band utilization, and load shedding curtailment agreements.
- A special package of investment incentives for Atlantis like fast-tracking of building plan approval and land use applications, the waiver of building plan scrutiny fees, reduced electricity tariffs for large electricity users, partial waiver of development contributions, as well as the establishment of an Investment Facilitation Office. Through these initiatives, business is less costly and more efficient to conduct in the area.

The biggest new investment was the GRI South Africa factory, which manufactures wind turbine towers. The investment was approximately 400 million rand and subsequently created 230 new jobs.

In 2018, the Department of Trade, Industry and Competition officially designated the Atlantis Industrial area a special economic zone (SEZ), under the Special Economic Zones Act, 2014. Thus, the Atlantis Special Economic Zone was established. The SEZ is managed by the Atlantis Special Economic Zone Company (ASEZCo), and is focused on green tech.

== See also ==
- Atlantis Special Economic Zone
- Atlantis Diesel Engines
