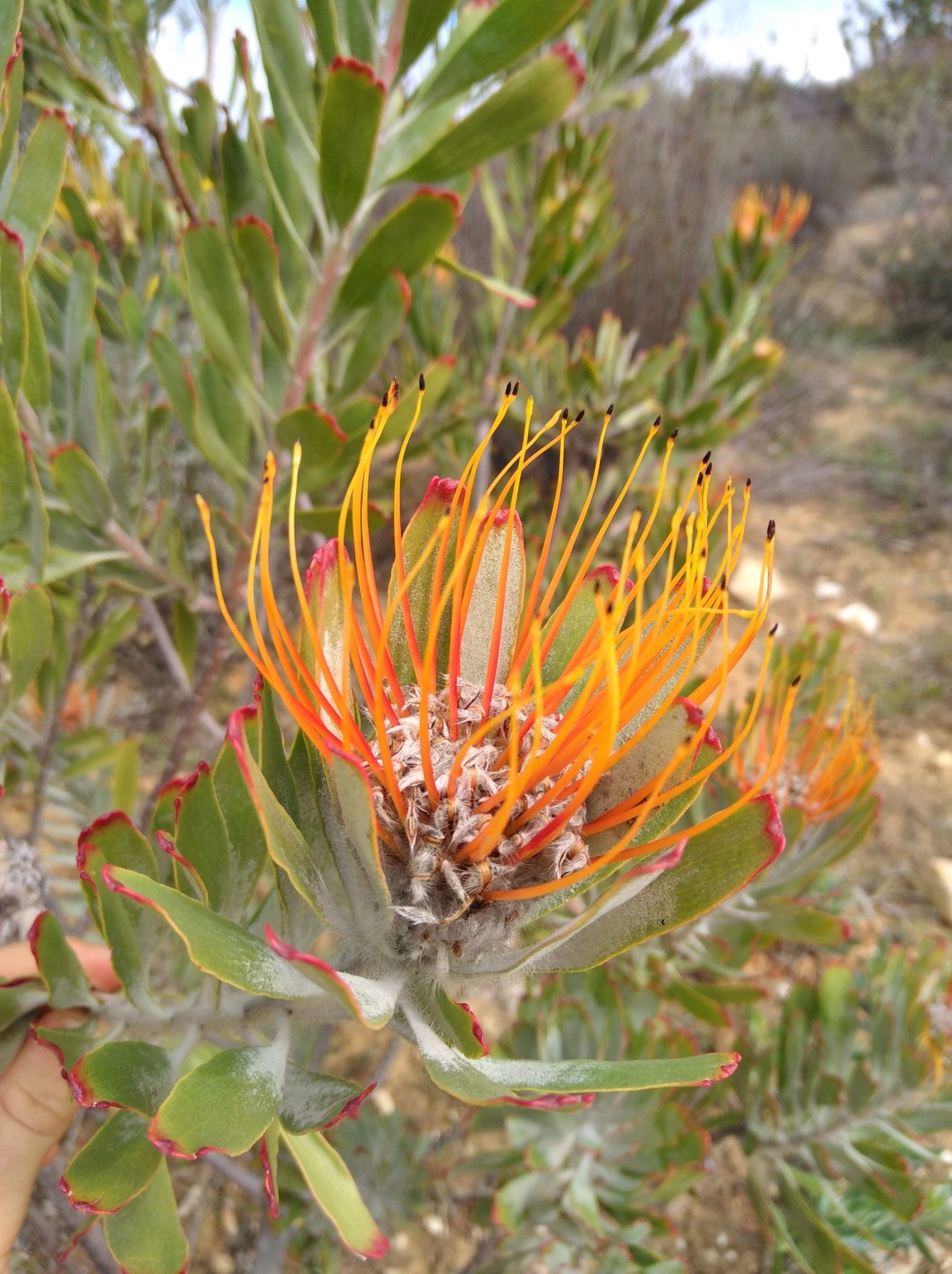

Conservation status
- Near Threatened (IUCN 3.1)

Scientific classification
- Kingdom: Plantae
- Clade: Embryophytes
- Clade: Tracheophytes
- Clade: Angiosperms
- Clade: Eudicots
- Order: Proteales
- Family: Proteaceae
- Genus: Leucospermum
- Species: L. praemorsum

Binomial name
- Leucospermum praemorsum E. Phillips

Synonyms
- L. attenuatum var. praemorsum, L. praemorsum Buek in Drège (nomen nudum)

= Leucospermum praemorsum =

Species of plant native to South Africa

Leucospermum praemorsum is an evergreen shrub or small tree of up to 5 m (16 ft) high. It has hairless oblong to inverted lance-shaped leaves of 7–8 cm (2¾−3¼ in) long and 1½–2 cm (0.6−0.8 in) wide, tapering at their base to a stalk of up to 2 cm long, and cut-off at the tip with three to five teeth, and pale carmine, inverted cone-shaped flower heads. From the center of the flowers emerge long initially orange, later deep crimson styles that jointly give the impression of a pincushion. It is called Nardouw fountain-pincushion or Nardouw pincushion in English and Nardouwluisiesbos in Afrikaans. Flower heads can be found off and on throughout the year, particularly in older plants, with a peak between July and December. It is an endemic species that can only be found in part of the Western Cape province of South Africa.

== Description ==
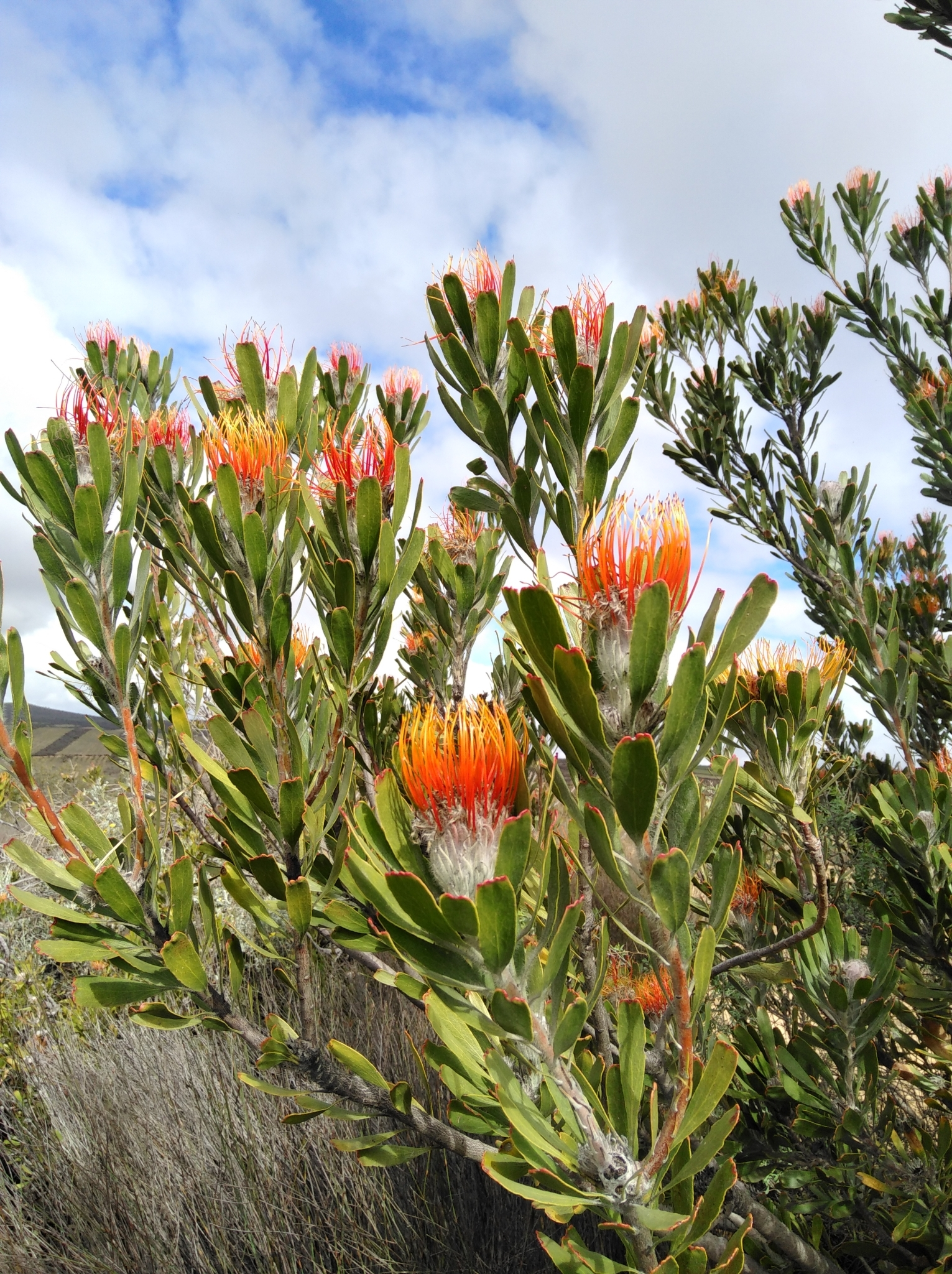
Habit

Leucospermum praemorsum is a large shrub or small tree of up to 5 m (16 ft) high and 7 m (23 ft) in diameter, that has a stout trunk at its base of up to 30 cm (1 ft) thick, that is covered in a smooth, grey bark, and branches from a height of 30 cm above the ground. Its flowering stems are stiff and upright, 5–7 mm thick, grey-felty at first, but soon losing the hairs. The hairless leaves are oblong to inverted lance-shaped, 7–8 cm (2¾−3¼ in) long, 1½–2 cm (0.6−0.8 in) wide, at its base tapering to a stalk of up to 2 cm long, that is spiderweb-like felty at its foot. The tip looks as if it is bitten-off, carries three to five teeth and is somewhat wavy.

The flower heads are initially broadly flattened inverted cone-shaped, about 7 cm (2¾ in) across, becoming narrowly inverted cone-shaped after pollination. It is set on a very short stalk of ¾−1 cm (0.3–0.4 in) long. The common base of the flowers in the same head is low cone-shaped with a pointy tip, about 2 cm (0.8 in) long and 1½ cm (0.6 in) wide. The pinkish-grey bracts that subtend each flower head are loosely arranged, narrowly lance- to line-shaped, up to 2 cm long, with a long, slightly incurved pointy tip, greyish due to long, spreading, silky hairs.

The bract that subtends each flower individually is inverted lance-shaped, suddenly narrowing into a pointed tip, densely set with woolly hairs in the lower half, the tip greyish due to a covering of long spreading silky hairs. The 4-merous, pale carmine perianth is 2½–3 cm long, uniformly covered in hairs villous and strongly incurved while in bud. The lowest, fully merged, part of the perianth, called tube, is about 8 mm (⅓ in) long, hairless and narrow at the base, powdery hairy higher up. The upper part (or limbs), which enclosed the pollen presenter in the bud, consists of four narrowly lance-shaped lobes with a pointy tip, covered in short felty hairs and some long silky hairs. From the perianth emerges a style of 5–6 cm (2.0–2.4 in) long, that is initially orange, later developing to deep crimson, with the highest portion of the style curved towards the center of the head when the flower opens. The greenish thickened part at the tip of the style called pollen presenter is egg- to cylinder-shaped, about 2½ mm long and ¾ mm thick, with a groove acting as the stigma across the very tip. The ovary is subtended by four pale yellow, awl-shaped scales of about 3 mm (0.12 in) long.

=== Differences with related species ===
The Nardouw fountain pincushion can be distinguished from its closest relatives by its loosely arranged, softly hairy, narrowly lance-shaped to line-shaped involucral bracts, the stalked inverted lance-shaped leaves, cut-off at the tip, and an egg-shaped to cylinder-shaped pollen-presenter.

== Taxonomy ==
As far as we know, Johann Franz Drège was the first to collect the Nardouw fountain pincushion for science in 1830 on the sand flats near Biedouw. Heinrich Wilhelm Buek created the name Leucospermum praemorsum in a book by Drège from 1844, but failed to provide a description. Carl Meissner provided in 1856 a description and called it L. attenuatum var. praemorsum. In 1912, Edwin Percy Phillips decided that the Nardouw fountain pincushion was a separate species, and made the new combination Leucospermum praemorsum, since Buek's name was not valid. L. praemorsum has been assigned to the section Cardinistyle.

The name praemorsum is Latin and means ¨bitten off¨.

== Distribution, habitat and ecology ==
The Nardouw fountain pincushion occurs from near the Lokenberg to the Gifberg in the Calvinia district, south to the plateau surrounding the Nardouwberg, near Wupperthal and the Biedouw Valley. Here the plants grow at 300–750 m (1000–2500 ft) altitude in dry circumstances in deep sandy soils that developed from Table Mountain Sandstone. Although the average annual precipitation across its distribution area is only 250–380 mm (10–15 in), mainly falling during the winter half year, it also benefits from the frequent mists that occur there. On the Nardouwberg plateau, the species occurs in large stands in a sparse vegetation that further consists of tufts of the large Restionid Willdenowia lucaeana and a few Leucadendron procerum shrubs, small annuals and geophytes. Due to the low biomass and the extensive areas of bare sand, wildfires are probably rare and superficial. Therefore, most Nardouw fountain pincushion specimens are old (50 to 80 years) and have grown into small trees, often over 5 m (15 ft) high, with a trunk of up to 30 cm (1 ft) across.

It was reported that about 90% of the specimens in one stand near Clanwilliam died as a consequence of tunneling in the bark by the ant Melissotarsus beccarii, and the sap extraction by their "husbandry", the scale insect Morganella conspicua (family Diaspididae). This animal completes its full life-cycle in these tunnels, and apparently adapted to this life-style by having lost its scales.

The species is pollinated by birds. When the ripe fruits fall to the ground about two months after flowering, the seeds are collected by native ants that carry them to their underground nests; here they remain protected against overhead fire and seed-eating rodents and birds, until they germinate after a fire has destroyed the mature overhead shrubs.

== Conservation ==
Leucospermum praemorsum is considered a vulnerable species because it has a generation time of twenty years and its habitat is estimated to have shrunk by at least 30% in the last sixty years due to agricultural expansion, groundwater extraction, overgrazing and occasional wildfires.
