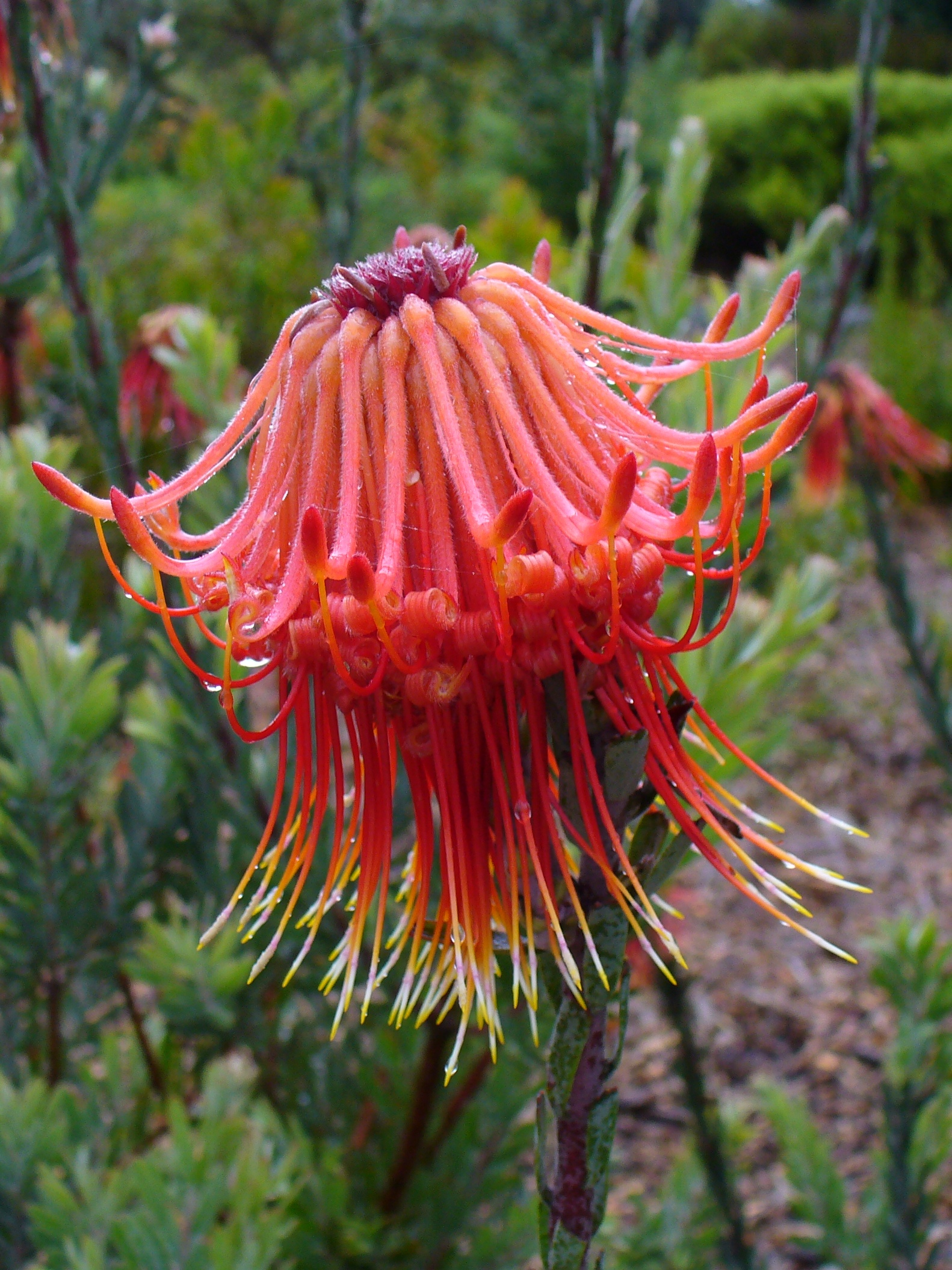

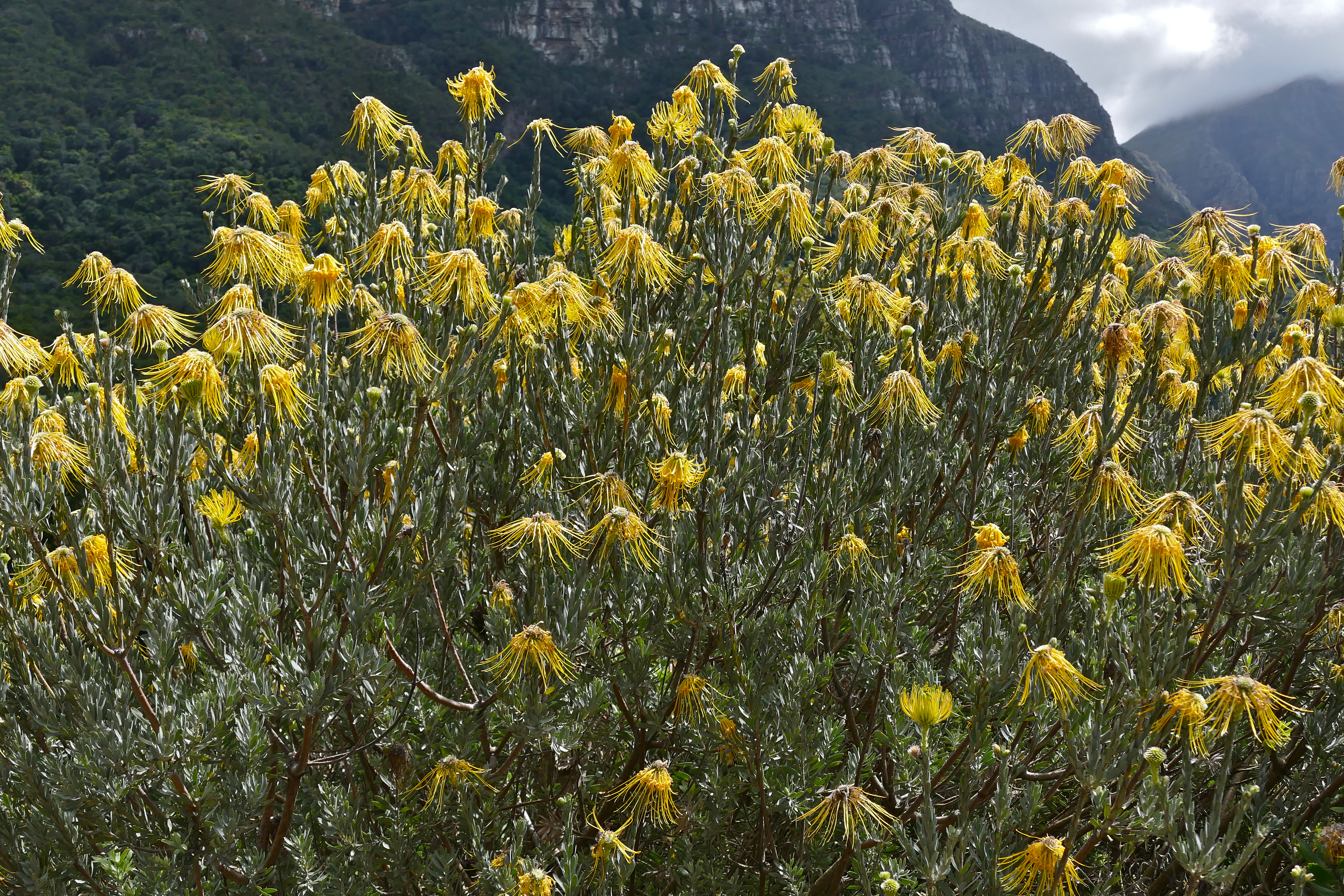

Conservation status
- Near Threatened (IUCN 3.1)

Scientific classification
- Kingdom: Plantae
- Clade: Embryophytes
- Clade: Tracheophytes
- Clade: Angiosperms
- Clade: Eudicots
- Order: Proteales
- Family: Proteaceae
- Genus: Leucospermum
- Species: L. reflexum

Binomial name
- Leucospermum reflexum H.Buek ex Meisn.

Synonyms
- Leucadendron reflexum

= Leucospermum reflexum =

Species of plant native to South Africa

Leucospermum reflexum is a large rounded shrub that is assigned to the family Proteaceae. It grows from a single trunk and its branches are covered in smooth grey bark. It has small elliptic to inverted lance-shaped greyish leaves of only 2–5½ cm (0.8–2.2 in) long. The heads consist of mostly dark orange (rarely pale yellow) 4-merous flowers, from which long, identically colored styles emerge, which are directed straight down during flowering. It is called rocket pincushion or skyrocket leucospermum in English and perdekop (horse head) in Afrikaans. It flowers from the end of August to December. It is an endemic species that can only be found in the southwest of South Africa.

== Description ==
The rocket pincushion is a large rounded shrub of up to 4 m (13 ft) in diameter, which grows from a single trunk at its base. The branches are covered in smooth grey bark. The flowering stems are stiffly upright and 3–6 mm (0.12–0.24 in) thick. These are grey due to a dense covering of fine twisted hairs pressed to the surface and some long straight erect hairs. The alternately set leaves are directed upwards at an angle with the branch, elliptic to inverted lance-shaped and only 2–5½ cm (0.8–2.2 in) long, ½–1¼ cm (0.2–0.5 in) wide, and also have a dense covering of fine twisted hairs pressed to the surface. The tip of the leaf mostly has two or three teeth, but is sometimes entire.

The flower heads are set individually near the end of the branches, globe to egg-shaped when young, 8–10 cm (3.1–3.9 in) in diameter on a stalk of 3–6 cm (1.2–2.4 in) long. The common base of the flowers in the same head is narrowly cylinder-shaped, 2–3½ cm (0.8–1.4 in) long and ½–¾ cm wide (0.2–0.3 in) thick. The bracts subtending the flowerhead are narrowly triangular with a pointy tip, 1–1¼ cm (0.4–0.5 in) long and 4 mm (0.16 in) wide at its foot, rubbery in consistency, with a poor tuft of long hairs at its tip and a row of hairs along its margin (like an eyelash). The bract subtending the individual flower tightly embrace the perianth at its foot, are about 1 cm (0.4 in) long and 6–8 mm wide at its base with a pointy tip that may curve out, with thick woolly hairs at the base and thinner set with long straight hairs near the top.

The perianth itself is 4–5 cm (1.6–2 in) long, mostly crimson to deep orange, very rarely pale yellow. The lowest part that remains fused after the flower opens called tube is about 1 cm (0.4 in) long, hairless and narrow at the foot and finely powdery and wider nearer to the top. The middle part that is split when the flower has opened, called claws, are uniformly covered in soft long hairs, strongly bending as soon as the flower opens and forcing the style downward. The wider, terminal parts of the perianth called limbs, that cover the pollen presenter in the bud, are very narrowly lance-shaped to linear, 5–6 mm (0.20–0.24 in) long and about 1½ mm (0.06 in) wide with pointy tips are also covered soft long hairs. Three of the claws remain attached over their full length forming a sheeth, the fourth free, but the limbs of all four attached and in-rolled. The anthers are directly attached to the perianth limbs, without filaments, awl-shaped, 4–5 mm (0.16–0.20 in) long. The style is 7–7½ cm (2.8–3.0 in) long; initially orange, later becoming deep crimson, yellow in the yellow form. The pollen presenter is as wide as the style, white, greenish yellow near the tip, cylindric to awl-shaped with a sharp tip, 5–6 mm (0.20–0.24 in) long, with an ever so slight knick at its base. The ovary, that is enclosed by the base of the perianth tube, is subtended by four awl-shaped, rubbery scales of about 3 mm (0.12 in) long.

The subtribe Proteinae, to which the genus Leucospermum has been assigned, consistently has a basic chromosome number of twelve (2n=24).

=== Movements of the style ===
Although the styles of all species belonging to the section Cardinistyle move during the development of the flowers, this unique phenomenon is at its extreme in L. reflexum. The movement is forced by the perianth tube. At first, in the young bud, the tube is straight, its base making a right angle to the cylindrical, upright common base of the flower head. When the style breaks through the sutures between the perianth claws and has arched down, the upward-facing side of the perianth tube quickly grows through elongation of the cells. This makes the whole perianth curve downwards, so that the upper half makes a 90° angle with the lower half of the perianth tube. The style, which is tightly enclosed in the perianth tube, is forced to also make a right angle about 6 mm (0.24 in) above the ovary. At this phase, all styles are directing downwards, parallel to the stalk of the flower head. At the end of the flowering, the perianth loses it turgor, dries out and becomes papery, and so the styles return to their original orientation during the fruiting stage, spreading out at right angles to the axis.

=== Differences with related species ===
The rocket pincushion has small elliptic to inverted lance-shaped leaves of only 2–5½ cm (0.8–2.2 in) long, that are grey due to a dense covering of fine twisted hairs pressed to the leaf surface, a cylinder-shaped common fase of the flowers, and perianths facing straight downwards when open.

== Taxonomy ==
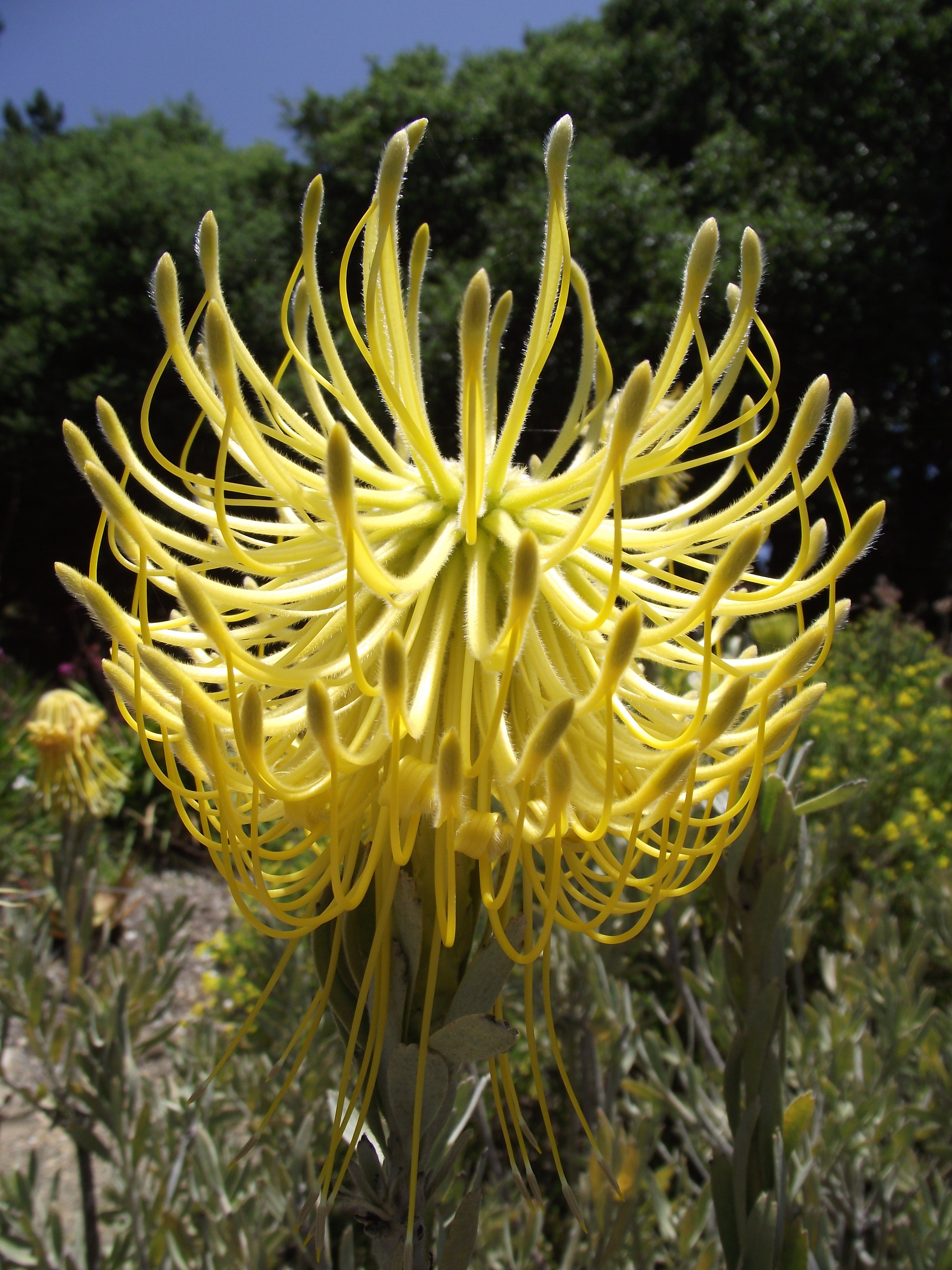
The rare yellow form, which is relatively often cultivated, here in the University of California Botanical Garden

The rocket pincushion was first collected in 1830 by Johann Franz Drège, who found it near the Heuning Vlei. Heinrich Wilhelm Buek created the name Leucospermum reflexum in a book by Johann Franz Drège from 1843, and Carl Meissner provided in 1856 a description for L. reflexum. Otto Kuntze moved the species in 1891 to Leucadendron. L. reflexum has been assigned to the section Cardinistyle. The species name reflexum originates from Latin and means "turned back".

== Distribution, habitat and ecology ==
L. reflexum is an endemic species that is only found in the east of the Cederberg mountains between Wupperthal in the south to the Pakhuis Pass in the north. It occurs between 900 and 1800 m (3000–6000 ft) altitude. The annual rainfall in its range is 250–380 mm (10–15 in), mainly during the winter. Due to the area's dry climate and its preference for relatively moist conditions, it grows mainly in locations such as in seepage areas or along streams, where it is often in the company of the reed-like restionid Cannomois virgata and common bracken Pteridium aquilinum.
