= List of heritage sites in Clanwilliam =

This is a list of the heritage sites in Clanwilliam, Western Cape as recognized by the South African Heritage Resources Agency.

SAHRA identifier	Site name	Description	Town	District	NHRA status	Coordinates	Image
9/2/022/0001	Boontjieskloof Farm Clanwilliam District		Clanwilliam	Clanwilliam			Upload Photo
9/2/022/0002	CLANWILLIAM MUNICIPAL AREA, GENERAL		Clanwilliam	Clanwilliam			
9/2/022/0003	Caleta Cove, Clanwilliam		Clanwilliam	Clanwilliam			Upload Photo
9/2/022/0004	British Graves, Lamberts Bay, Clanwilliam		Lamberts Bay	Clanwilliam			Upload Photo
9/2/022/0005	Clanwilliam Museum, Main Street, Clanwilliam	Symmetrical stone building with three-bayed central pavilion. Plaster decorations at windows and corners. Round headed openings. Left hand side has addition constructed c. 1890. Parapets with moulded cornices conceal low-pitched roof. This Georgian building, the core of which was probably erected as early as 1808, is a prominent architectural feature in the historic core of Clanwilliam. Type of site: Government; Previous use: Prison. Current use: Museum.	Clanwilliam	Clanwilliam	Provincial Heritage Site	32°10′33″S 18°53′34″E	Symmetrical stone building with three-bayed central pavilion. Plaster decorations at windows and corners. Round headed openings. Left hand side has addition constructed c. 1890. Parapets with moulded cornices conceal low-pitched roof. This Georgian building, the core of which was probably erected as early as 1808, is a prominent architectural feature in the historic core of Clanwilliam. Type of site: Government Previous use: Prison. Current use: Museum.
9/2/022/0006	Dovecote and Anglo-Boer War blockhouse, Graafwater Farm, Clanwilliam District	Type of site: Dovecote, Blockhouse		Clanwilliam	Provincial Heritage Site	32°09′05″S 18°35′35″E	Upload Photo
9/2/022/0006-001	Dovecote, Graafwater Farm, Clanwilliam District	Type of site: Dovecote		Clanwilliam	Provincial Heritage Site	32°08′44″S 18°36′50″E	Upload Photo
9/2/022/0006-002	Anglo-Boer War blockhouse, Graafwater Farm, Clanwilliam District	Type of site: Blockhouse		Clanwilliam	Provincial Heritage Site	32°08′44″S 18°36′50″E	Upload Photo
9/2/022/0007	Sandveld cottage, Thee Rivier, Clanwilliam District (Pending N M)		Clanwilliam	Clanwilliam			Upload Photo
9/2/022/0008	Cederberg Wilderness Area, Clanwilliam District		Clanwilliam	Clanwilliam			
9/2/022/0009	Steenbokfontein, Clanwilliam District		Clanwilliam	Clanwilliam		32°10′05″S 18°18′53″E	Upload Photo
9/2/022/0010	St John's Anglican Church, Main Street, Clanwilliam	Rectangular stone building with steep slate roof and a straight-sided gable at its front end. The choir behind, following the same form, is an 1876 addition. The building known as "St John the Evangelist" is probably the most unaltered example of the work of Sophia Gray, the wife of Bishop Robert Gray, first Anglican Bishop of Cape Town. Since the arrival of the Grays in the Cape in 1843, Sophia Grey was respo Type of site: Church; Current use: Church : Anglican. This neo-Gothic church building, designed by Sophia Gray, was erected in 1865 on the remains of an earlier Settler church. The building was inaugurated in 1866 by Bishop Gray. The parsonage, which presumably dates from the 1840s, is an exceedingly beautiful	Clanwilliam	Clanwilliam	Provincial Heritage Site	32°10′44″S 18°53′35″E	Rectangular stone building with steep slate roof and a straight-sided gable at its front end. The choir behind, following the same form, is an 1876 addition. The building known as "St John the Evangelist" is probably the most unaltered example of the work of Sophia Gray, the wife of Bishop Robert Gray, first Anglican Bishop of Cape Town. Since the arrival of the Grays in the Cape in 1843, Sophia Grey was respo Type of site: Church Current use: Church : Anglican. This neo-Gothic church building, designed by Sophia Gray, was erected in 1865 on the remains of an earlier Settler church. The building was inaugurated in 1866 by Bishop Gray. The parsonage, which presumably dates from the 1840s, is an exceedingly beautiful
9/2/022/0010/1	Graves, St John's Anglican Church, Main Street, Clanwilliam		Clanwilliam	Clanwilliam		32°10′33″S 18°53′34″E	Upload Photo
9/2/022/0011	Irish Settlers house, off Main Street, Clanwilliam	Simple rectangular vernacular plastered building with thatched half-hipped roof. Small square windows. Some alterations. This Settler cottage dates from the early nineteenth century and represents the vernacular building style used by the Irish Settlers of the eighteen-twenties. Type of site: House; Previous use: House. Current use: Hotel accommodation. This Settler cottage dates from the early nineteenth century and represents the vernacular building style used by the Irish Settlers of the eighteen-twenties.	Clanwilliam	Clanwilliam	Provincial Heritage Site	32°10′33″S 18°53′34″E	Upload Photo
9/2/022/0012	Anglican Rectory, 37 Main Street, Clanwilliam	Thatched roofed building with white plastered walls. Front and back facades with dormer gables and good Georgian doors and windows are almost identical. The parsonage probably dates from the 1840s and is similar to the rectory in Bredasdorp. It has a very unusual plan, being square with only a narrow opening giving access to the central courtyard. The front and back facades, with dormer gables and Georg; Type of site: Parsonage; Current use: Parsonage. The parsonage, which presumably dates from the 1840s, is an exceedingly beautiful Old Cape thatched cottage.	Clanwilliam	Clanwilliam	Provincial Heritage Site	32°10′47″S 18°53′38″E	Thatched roofed building with white plastered walls. Front and back facades with dormer gables and good Georgian doors and windows are almost identical. The parsonage probably dates from the 1840s and is similar to the rectory in Bredasdorp. It has a very unusual plan, being square with only a narrow opening giving access to the central courtyard. The front and back facades, with dormer gables and Georg Type of site: Parsonage Current use: Parsonage. The parsonage, which presumably dates from the 1840s, is an exceedingly beautiful Old Cape thatched cottage.
9/2/022/0013	Old Dutch Reformed Church, Main Street, Clanwilliam	Very fine Cape Gothic church, rectangular in plan with small Gothic tower to street elevation. Also fine Gothic entrance gate. Now painted white, previously colour-washed with details picked out. This church building was designed in the neo-Gothic style by Carl Otto Hager, the well-known architect. Hager also supervised its erection, which was completed about 1864. Type of site: Church; Previous use: Church. Current use: Flower displays. This church building was designed in the neo-Gothic style by Carl Otto Hager, the well-known architect. Hager also supervised its erection, which was completed about 1864.	Clanwilliam	Clanwilliam	Provincial Heritage Site	32°10′49″S 18°53′37″E	Very fine Cape Gothic church, rectangular in plan with small Gothic tower to street elevation. Also fine Gothic entrance gate. Now painted white, previously colour-washed with details picked out. This church building was designed in the neo-Gothic style by Carl Otto Hager, the well-known architect. Hager also supervised its erection, which was completed about 1864. Type of site: Church Previous use: Church. Current use: Flower displays. This church building was designed in the neo-Gothic style by Carl Otto Hager, the well-known architect. Hager also supervised its erection, which was completed about 1864.
9/2/022/0013/001	Old Dutch Reformed Memorial Hall, Main Street, Clanwilliam	Type of site: Church This memorial hall falls within a proposed conservation area and forms part of an historical core of the town together with the old gaol, the Dutch Reformed Church, the Anglican Parsonage and the declared Park Street properties. Having been restored to i	Clanwilliam	Clanwilliam	Register	32°10′49″S 18°53′37″E	Upload Photo
9/2/022/0014	Orange tree, Hexrivier, Clanwilliam District	Type of site: Tree		Clanwilliam	Provincial Heritage Site	32°26′25″S 18°58′23″E	Upload Photo
9/2/022/0015	2 Park Street, Clanwilliam	This building was erected in the eighteen-twenties as a dwelling for the Deputy Landdrost. It is in the Cape Dutch style and TT -shaped. The building is one of the oldest dwellings in Clanwilliam. Type of site: House. Current use: Residential.	Clanwilliam	Clanwilliam	Provincial Heritage Site	32°10′51″S 18°53′40″E	This building was erected in the eighteen-twenties as a dwelling for the Deputy Landdrost. It is in the Cape Dutch style and TT -shaped. The building is one of the oldest dwellings in Clanwilliam. Type of site: House. Current use: Residential.
9/2/022/0016	Die Erf, 5 Park Street, Clanwilliam	his house in the Cape Dutch style housed one of the Drostdy officials shortly after the establishment of a sub-drostdy at Clanwilliam in 1808. Type of site: House. Current use: House.	Clanwilliam	Clanwilliam	Provincial Heritage Site	32°10′53″S 18°53′42″E	his house in the Cape Dutch style housed one of the Drostdy officials shortly after the establishment of a sub-drostdy at Clanwilliam in 1808. Type of site: House. Current use: House.
9/2/022/0017	Anglo-Boer War blockhouse, Cederberg, Clanwilliam District (Pending N M)		Clanwilliam	Clanwilliam			Upload Photo
9/2/022/0018	Kromme Rivier, Clanwilliam District		Clanwilliam	Clanwilliam			Upload Photo
9/2/022/0019	WUPPERTHAL, CLANWILLIAM DISTRICT, GENERAL		Wupperthal	Clanwilliam			Upload Photo
9/2/022/0020	Longkloof, Clanwilliam District		Clanwilliam	Clanwilliam			Upload Photo
9/2/022/0021	Grave of Lt Clowes, Pakhuis Pass, Clanwilliam District		Clanwilliam	Clanwilliam			Upload Photo
9/2/022/0022	Doorspring, Clanwilliam District		Clanwilliam	Clanwilliam		32°00′18″S 18°18′21″E	Upload Photo
9/2/022/0023	C. Louis Leipoldt rock shelter, Pakhuis Pass, Clanwilliam District		Clanwilliam	Clanwilliam			Upload Photo
9/2/022/0024	CLANWILLIAM MAGISTERIAL DISTRICT GENERAL		Clanwilliam	Clanwilliam			
9/2/022/0024/01	Archaeological Site, Clanwilliam District.		Clanwilliam	Clanwilliam			Upload Photo
9/2/022/0025	Old Residency, 3 Park Street, Clanwilliam	Type of site: Residency Previous use: Residency. Current use: House.	Clanwilliam	Clanwilliam	Provincial Heritage Site	32°10′52″S 18°53′40″E	Upload Photo
9/2/022/0026	Mission Station, Wupperthal, Clanwilliam District (Conservation area)		Wupperthal	Clanwilliam		32°14′19″S 19°11′44″E	
9/2/022/0027	Matjiesrivier Farm, Clanwilliam District		Clanwilliam	Clanwilliam			Upload Photo
9/2/022/0028	Lorraine, Clanwilliam District		Clanwilliam	Clanwilliam			Upload Photo
9/2/022/0029	LAMBERTS BAY MUNICIPAL AREA, GENERAL		Lamberts Bay	Clanwilliam			Upload Photo
9/2/022/0031	Kriedouwkrans Rock Paintings, Clanwilliam District		Clanwilliam	Clanwilliam			Upload Photo
9/2/022/0032	Rock Art Sites in Oliphants River Valley, Clanwilliam Dist		Clanwilliam	Clanwilliam			
9/2/022/0033	Rock Shelters, Kleinfontein Farm, Clanwilliam Dist		Clanwilliam	Clanwilliam			Upload Photo
9/2/022/0034	Military Graves, Farm Bodam, Clanwilliam District (War graves)		Clanwilliam	Clanwilliam			Upload Photo
9/2/022/0035	SEDERVILLE LOCAL AREA, GENERAL, CLANWILLIAM DISTRICT		Clanwilliam	Clanwilliam			Upload Photo
9/2/022/0036	CITRUSDAL MUNICIPAL AREA GENERAL		Clanwilliam	Clanwilliam			Upload Photo
9/2/022/0037	Heerenlogement, Graafwater, Clanwilliam District		Clanwilliam	Clanwilliam	Provincial Heritage Site	31°57′42″S 18°32′59″E	Upload Photo
9/2/022/0038	The Baths, Farm no 496, Citrusdal, Clanwilliam District		Citrusdal	Clanwilliam		32°35′06″S 19°00′41″E	Upload Photo
9/2/022/0051	Nortier Reserve, Clanwilliam			Clanwilliam	Deproclaimed	32°10′44″S 18°53′20″E	Upload Photo
9/9/022/0030	De Hangen Rock Shelter, Nardouwsberg, Clanilliam District			Clanwilliam			Upload Photo
