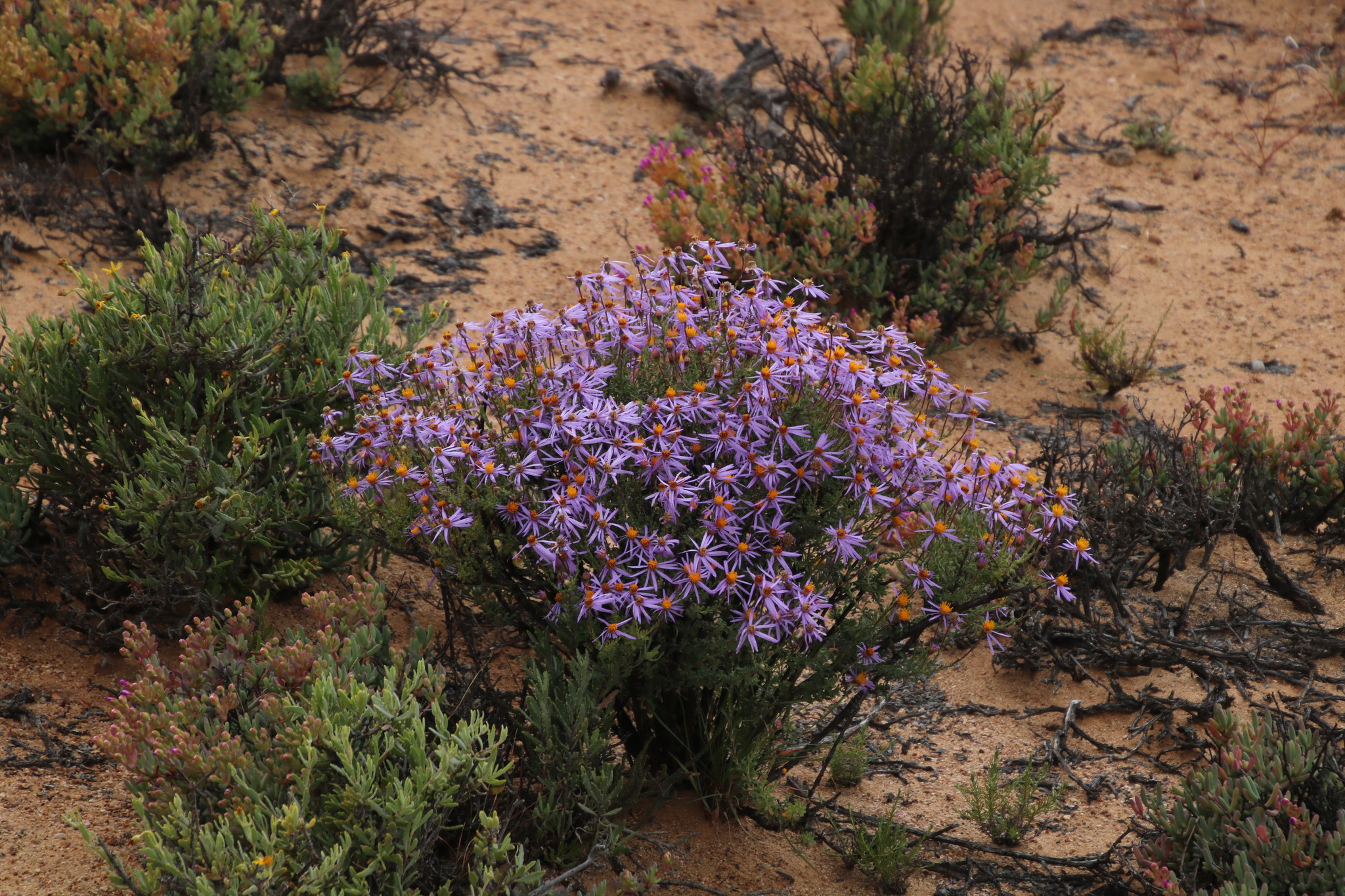

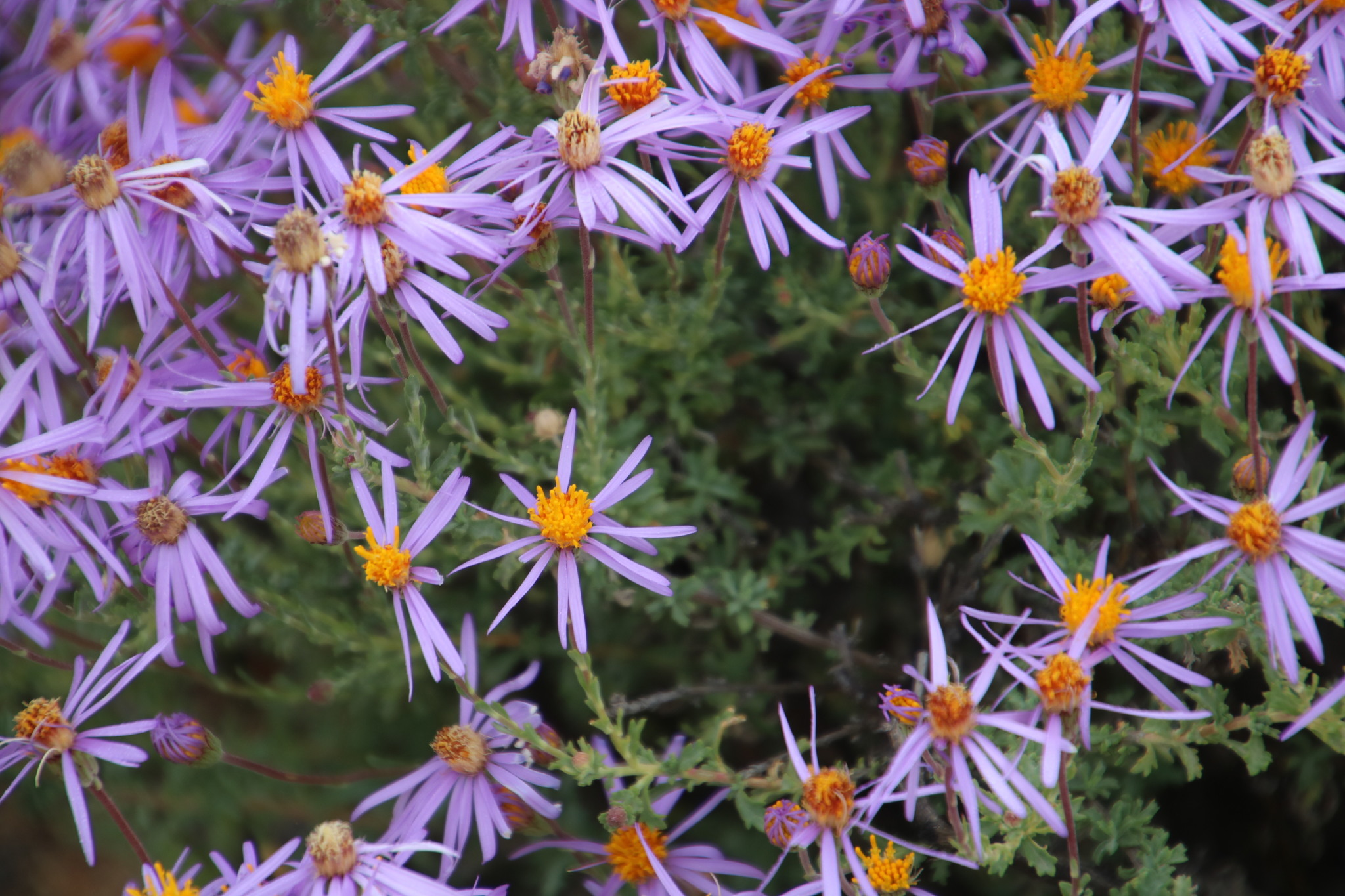

Scientific classification
- Kingdom: Plantae
- Clade: Tracheophytes
- Clade: Angiosperms
- Clade: Eudicots
- Clade: Asterids
- Order: Asterales
- Family: Asteraceae
- Genus: Felicia
- Section: Felicia sect. Lignofelicia
- Species: F. brevifolia

Binomial name
- Felicia brevifolia (DC.) Grau

Synonyms
- Agathaea brevifolia, Aster scabridus var. brevifolius; Aster dregei var. dentata, Felicia dregei var. dentata; Aster grossedentatus, Felicia grossedentata

= Felicia brevifolia =

Shrublet in the daisy family from southern Africa

Felicia brevifolia is an evergreen, richly branched shrub of up to 1 1/2 m (5 ft) high, that is assigned to the family Asteraceae. It has elliptic to wedge-shaped leaves, of between 1/2 and 1 1/2 cm long, green to gray-green, many with several teeth. The flower heads have about fifteen blue-violet ray florets, encircling many yellow disc florets. This species grows in southern Namibia and the west of South Africa.

== Description ==
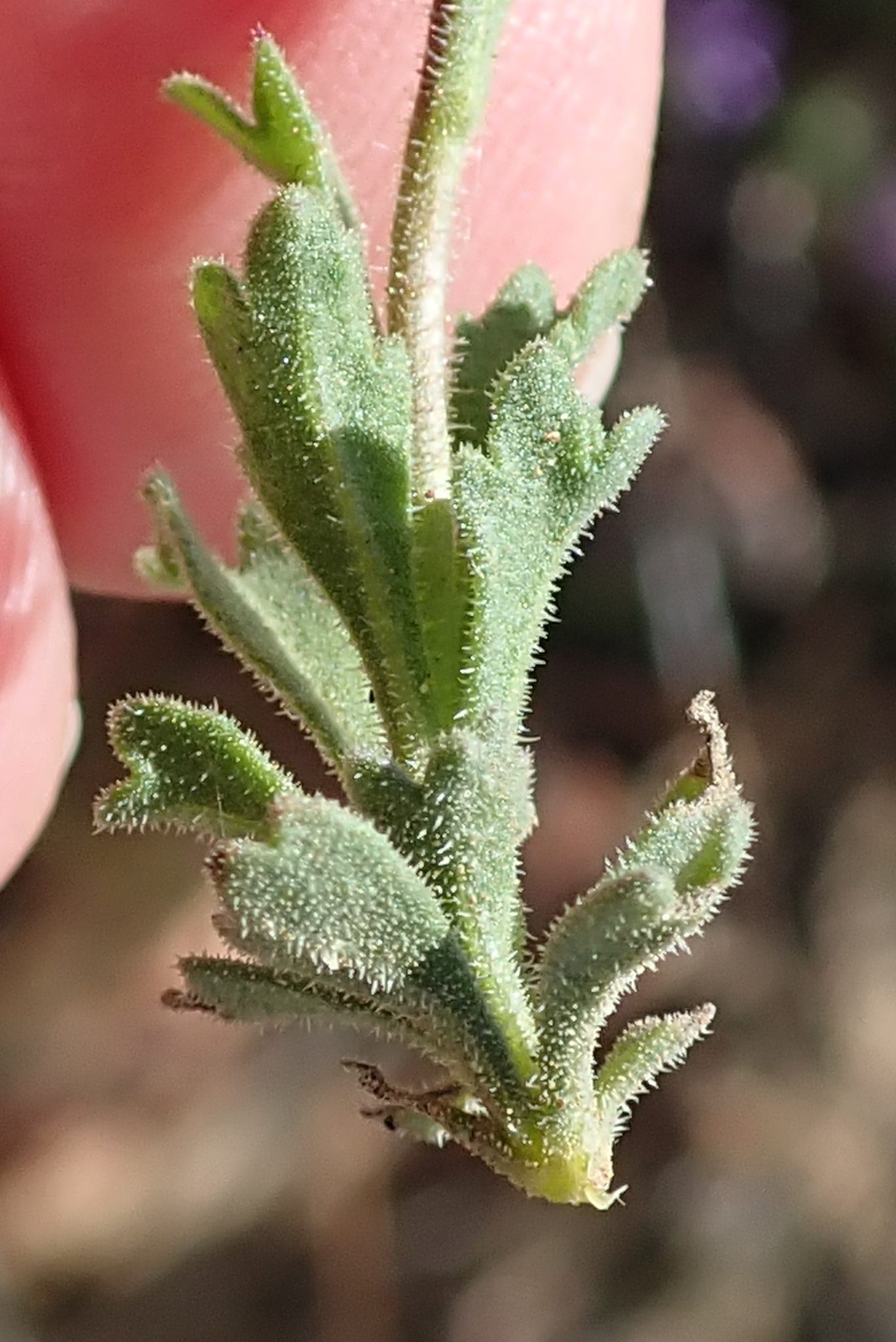
The gray-green leaves of a form with rough hair.

Felicia brevifolia is an evergreen, upright, up to 1 1/2 m (5 ft) high shrub, very woody and leafless at the base, covered in a fibrous, gray-brown bark. The older shoots support dense-leaved short shoots, and are topped by young long shoots. The leaves are alternately set, of very different size, between 5 mm (1/5 in) long and 2 mm (0.079 in) wide to 15 mm (3/5 in) long and 8 mm (1/3 in) wide, elliptic to wedge-shaped, without or with (sometimes up to ten) pointed-ovate teeth, with or nearly without a leaf stalk. The surface of the leaves may be carry short bristles, or bristles and glandular hairs, or is felty gray-green. The uppermost leaves are small, lance-shaped and entire.

The flower heads are set individually at the top of the long shoots, on up to 4 cm (1 1/2 in) long stalks. The involucre is up to 1 1/2 cm (0.6 in) in diameter and consists of three to four rows of bracts. These bracts overlap, are 1 mm (0.039 in) wide, are covered in glandular and bristly hairs, and have a papery fringe. The outer bracts are about 2 mm (0.079 in) and the inner about 4 mm (0.16 in) long. The fifteen or so female ray florets have blue-violet ligules of about 25 mm (1 in) long and 2 mm (0.079 in) wide. They encircle numerous bisexual disc florets, with a yellow corolla of about 8 mm (1/3 in) high, that is sometimes washed red at the five triangular free lobes. In the center of each corolla are five anthers merged into a tube, through which the style grows when the floret opens, hoovering up the pollen on its shaft. At the tip of both style branches is a narrowly triangular appendage. Around the base of the corolla are numerous yellowish white, toothed, persistent pappus bristles, which are all of the same length, up to about 8 mm (1/3 in). Very rarely with a few short (0.2 to 0.3 mm long) basal scales represent short pappus. The dry, one-seeded, indehiscent fruits called cypselae are elliptic, about 5 mm (1/5 in) long and 3 mm (0.12 in) wide, yellowish brown in colour, with a pale, densely hairy marginal ridge, the surface in the upper half with few silky hairs or hairless, without other adornment.

== Taxonomy ==
As far as known, this species of daisy was first collected by Johann Franz Drège in 1835 at Zilverfontein in Namaqualand. In 1836, the species was described by Augustin Pyramus de Candolle, who named it Agathaea brevifolia, but in the same publication also described Felicia dregei β dentata, bases on another specimen collected by Drège. In 1865, William Henry Harvey regarded De Candole's first name no more than a variety and made the combination Aster scabridus var. brevifolius, and reassigned De Candole's second name to Aster, creating Aster dregei var. dentata. in 1932, German botanist, and explorer in South West Africa, Kurt Dinter described Aster grossedentatus based on a specimen he found in 1929 in Great Namaland in the !Karas Region of Namibia. It was reassigned as Felicia grossedentata by mr. P. Range in 1936. Jürke Grau in 1973 considered all these name synonymous and this made it necessary to create the combination Felicia brevifolia. The species is considered part of the section Lignofelicia.

== Distribution ==
Felicia brevifolia can be found in two larger isolated populations, one between to the east of Lüderitz in Namibia, and in Namaqualand in South Africa. A small population is known from 45 km (28 mi) north of Calvinia and possibly from near Ceres.

== Conservation ==
The continued survival of Felicia brevifolia is considered to be of least concern because its population is stable.
