= Leipoldtia calandra =

Scientific classification
- Kingdom: Plantae
- Clade: Tracheophytes
- Clade: Angiosperms
- Clade: Eudicots
- Order: Caryophyllales
- Family: Aizoaceae
- Genus: Leipoldtia
- Species: L. calandra

Binomial name
- Leipoldtia calandra (L.Bolus) L.Bolus

Synonyms
- Mesembryanthemum calandrum L.Bolus

Species of succulent

Leipoldtia calandra is a succulent plant that is part of the Aizoaceae family. The plant is endemic to the Northern Cape.
