= Leipoldtia compacta =

Scientific classification
- Kingdom: Plantae
- Clade: Tracheophytes
- Clade: Angiosperms
- Clade: Eudicots
- Order: Caryophyllales
- Family: Aizoaceae
- Genus: Leipoldtia
- Species: L. compacta

Binomial name
- Leipoldtia compacta L.Bolus

Synonyms
- Ruschia gibbosa L.Bolus

Species of succulent

Leipoldtia compacta is a succulent plant that is part of the Aizoaceae family. The plant is endemic to the Northern Cape.
