= Jan F. E. Celliers =

South African poet

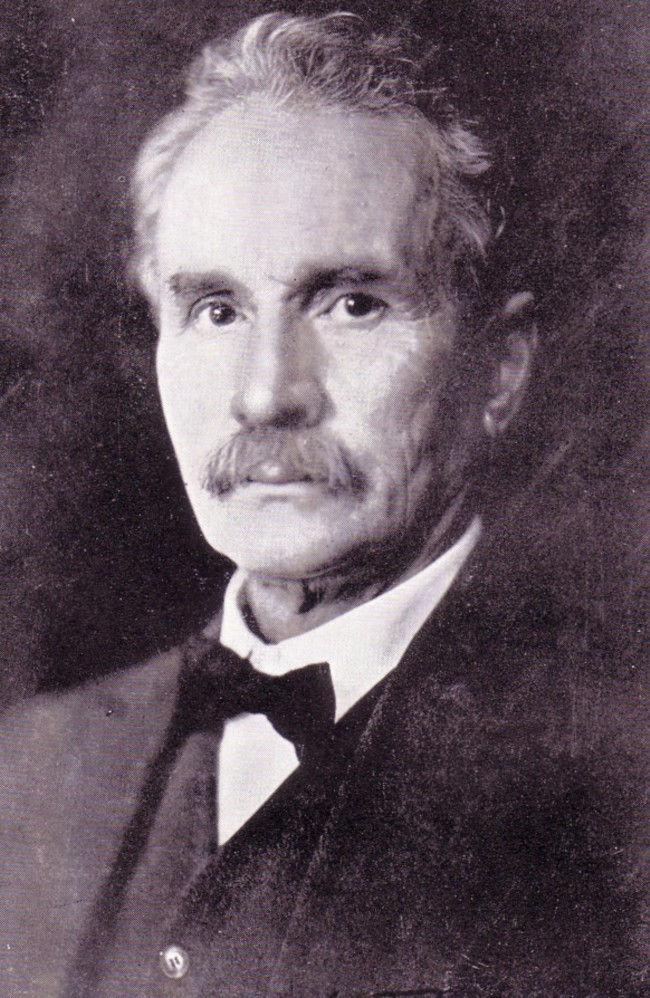
Jan F.E. Celliers

Jan Francois Elias Celliers, almost universally known as Jan F.E. Celliers, but occasionally as Jan F.E. Cilliers (12 January 1865 – 1 June 1940) was an Afrikaans-language poet, essayist, dramatist and reviewer.

Celliers was one of the three outstanding Afrikaans-language poets who wrote in the immediate wake of the Second Boer War; together with Totius and C. Louis Leipoldt, Celliers' youthful poetry writes of the devastation of the war in the youthful language of Afrikaans. His best poems appear in the 1908 collection Die Vlakte en ander gedigte ("The Plains and Other Poems).

Celliers was born near Wellington, Cape Colony. After a childhood near Cape Town, Celliers and his family moved to Pretoria, in the then-country of Transvaal in 1874. When the Second Boer War broke out, Celliers fought at Colesberg by Kimberley until the end of the war. Escaping through British lines wearing his wife's clothes, Celliers went to Europe until his 1907 return to South Africa. From 1919 to 1940 Celliers was a professor at Stellenbosch University. He died in Johannesburg, Transvaal—now Gauteng Province.

== Literature ==
- J. E. H. Grobler, The War Reporter: the Anglo-Boer war through the eyes of the burghers, Johannesburg: Jonathan Ball Publishers, 2004. ISBN 978-1-86842-186-2. Pages 42, 50, 52, 98, 124, 135, and 147.
