= Leipoldtia laxa =

Scientific classification
- Kingdom: Plantae
- Clade: Tracheophytes
- Clade: Angiosperms
- Clade: Eudicots
- Order: Caryophyllales
- Family: Aizoaceae
- Genus: Leipoldtia
- Species: L. laxa

Binomial name
- Leipoldtia laxa L.Bolus

Synonyms
- Leipoldtia framesii L.Bolus

Species of succulent

Leipoldtia laxa is a succulent plant that is part of the Aizoaceae family. The plant is endemic to the Northern Cape and the Western Cape.
