= Dingaanstat =

Dingaanstat mission
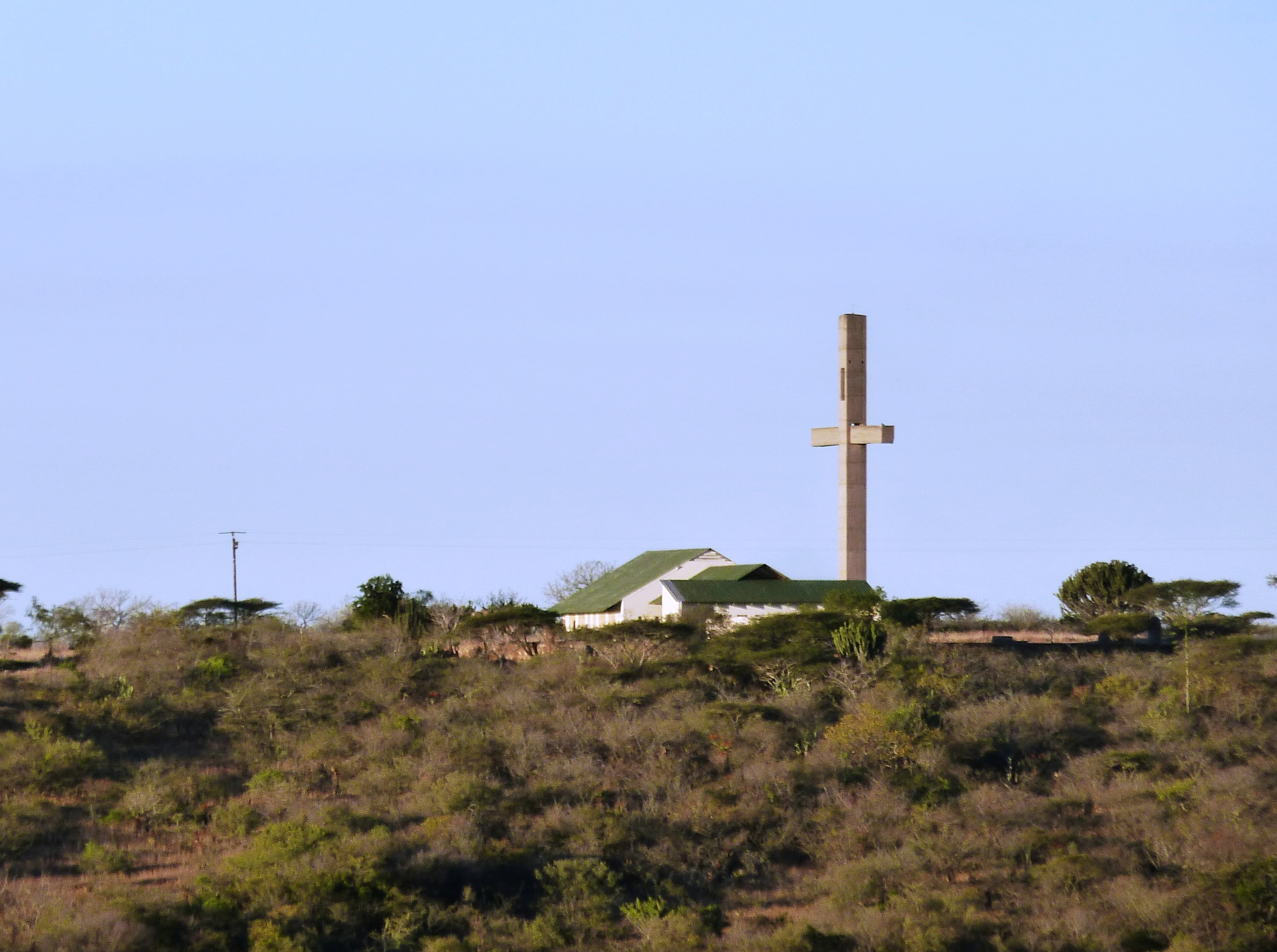
- Dingaanstat Mission Station

- Location within KwaZulu-Natal Location within South Africa
- Coordinates: 28.435°S 31.279°E
- Country: South Africa
- Province: KwaZulu-Natal
- District: Zululand
- Municipality: Ulundi
- Time zone: UTC+2 (SAST)

Dingaanstat is the 'stat' or village of Dingaan (Dingane, Udingane). The village is known to the Zulu as Umgungundlovu, and was under Zulu rule from 1795 until 1840. Now a mission station of the Dutch Reformed Church, it is situated between Melmoth and Babanango.
