= Leipoldtia alborosea =

Scientific classification
- Kingdom: Plantae
- Clade: Tracheophytes
- Clade: Angiosperms
- Clade: Eudicots
- Order: Caryophyllales
- Family: Aizoaceae
- Genus: Leipoldtia
- Species: L. alborosea

Binomial name
- Leipoldtia alborosea (L.Bolus) H.E.K.Hartmann & Stüber

Synonyms
- Eberlanzia vanheerdei L.Bolus; Mesembryanthemum alboroseum L.Bolus

Species of succulent

Leipoldtia alborosea is a succulent plant that is part of the Aizoaceae family. The plant is native to Namibia and South Africa, where it occurs in the Northern Cape.
