= Leipoldtia rosea =

Scientific classification
- Kingdom: Plantae
- Clade: Tracheophytes
- Clade: Angiosperms
- Clade: Eudicots
- Order: Caryophyllales
- Family: Aizoaceae
- Genus: Leipoldtia
- Species: L. rosea

Binomial name
- Leipoldtia rosea L.Bolus

Synonyms
- Cephalophyllum calvinianum L.Bolus; Cephalophyllum roseum (L.Bolus) L.Bolus

Species of succulent

Leipoldtia rosea is a succulent plant that is part of the Aizoaceae family. The plant is endemic to the Northern Cape and the Western Cape.
