= Leipoldtia uniflora =

Scientific classification
- Kingdom: Plantae
- Clade: Tracheophytes
- Clade: Angiosperms
- Clade: Eudicots
- Order: Caryophyllales
- Family: Aizoaceae
- Genus: Leipoldtia
- Species: L. uniflora

Binomial name
- Leipoldtia uniflora L.Bolus

Species of succulent

Leipoldtia uniflora is a succulent plant that is part of the Aizoaceae family. The plant is endemic to the Northern Cape.
