= Leipoldtia schultzei =

Scientific classification
- Kingdom: Plantae
- Clade: Tracheophytes
- Clade: Angiosperms
- Clade: Eudicots
- Order: Caryophyllales
- Family: Aizoaceae
- Genus: Leipoldtia
- Species: L. schultzei

Binomial name
- Leipoldtia schultzei (Schltr. & Diels) Friedrich

Synonyms
- Leipoldtia amplexicaulis (L.Bolus) L.Bolus; Leipoldtia aprica (A.Berger) L.Bolus; Leipoldtia brevifolia L.Bolus; Leipoldtia britteniae (L.Bolus) L.Bolus; Leipoldtia constricta (L.Bolus) L.Bolus; Leipoldtia herrei (Schwantes) Schwantes; Leipoldtia jacobseniana Schwantes; Leipoldtia nelii L.Bolus; Leipoldtia pauciflora L.Bolus; Mesembryanthemum amplexicaule L.Bolus; Mesembryanthemum apodanthum Schltr. & Diels; Mesembryanthemum apricum A.Berger; Mesembryanthemum britteniae L.Bolus; Mesembryanthemum constrictum L.Bolus; Mesembryanthemum schultzei Schltr. & Diels; Rhopalocyclus herrei Schwantes; Rhopalocyclus nelii Schwantes

Species of succulent

Leipoldtia schultzei is a shrub that is part of the Aizoaceae family. The plant is endemic to the Northern Cape, Eastern Cape and Western Cape.
