= Leipoldtia weigangiana =

Scientific classification
- Kingdom: Plantae
- Clade: Tracheophytes
- Clade: Angiosperms
- Clade: Eudicots
- Order: Caryophyllales
- Family: Aizoaceae
- Genus: Leipoldtia
- Species: L. weigangiana

Binomial name
- Leipoldtia weigangiana (Dinter) Dinter & Schwantes ex H.Jacobsen

Synonyms
- Cephalophyllum weigangianum (Dinter) Dinter & Schwantes; Mesembryanthemum weigangianum Dinter; Rhopalocyclus weigangianus (Dinter) Dinter & Schwantes

Species of succulents

Leipoldtia weigangiana is a succulent plant that is part of the Aizoaceae family. The plant is endemic to Namibia and the Northern Cape.

The plant has three subspecies:

- Leipoldtia weigangiana subsp. grandifolia (L.Bolus) H.E.K.Hartmann & S.Rust
- Leipoldtia weigangiana subsp. littlewoodii (L.Bolus) H.E.K.Hartmann & S.Rust
- Leipoldtia weigangiana subsp. weigangiana
