= Leipoldtia klaverensis =

Scientific classification
- Kingdom: Plantae
- Clade: Tracheophytes
- Clade: Angiosperms
- Clade: Eudicots
- Order: Caryophyllales
- Family: Aizoaceae
- Genus: Leipoldtia
- Species: L. klaverensis

Binomial name
- Leipoldtia klaverensis L.Bolus

Species of succulent

Leipoldtia klaverensis is a succulent plant that is part of the Aizoaceae family. The plant is endemic to the Western Cape and occurs at Klawer. The plant has a range of less than 280 km² and is threatened by the planting of vineyards.
