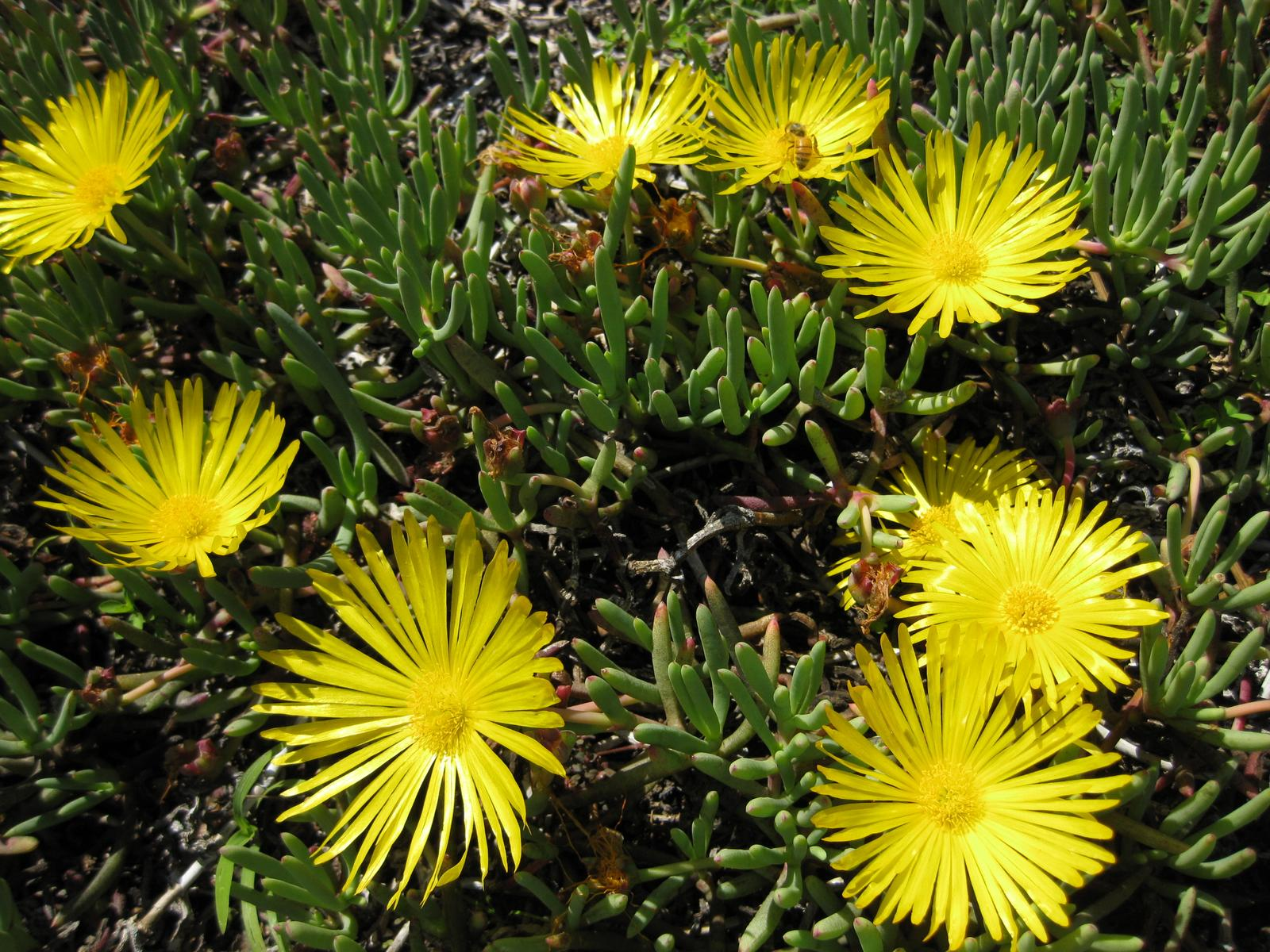

Scientific classification
- Kingdom: Plantae
- Clade: Tracheophytes
- Clade: Angiosperms
- Clade: Eudicots
- Order: Caryophyllales
- Family: Aizoaceae
- Genus: Leipoldtia
- Species: L. frutescens

Binomial name
- Leipoldtia frutescens (L.Bolus) H.E.K.Hartmann

Synonyms
- Cephalophyllum frutescens L.Bolus

= Leipoldtia frutescens =

Species of succulent

Leipoldtia frutescens is a succulent plant that is part of the Aizoaceae family. The plant is endemic to the Northern Cape. The plant has a range of 1700 km² and five subpopulations are known. The plant occurs on the coast in northern Namaqualand. The plant has lost habitat to mining activities and the threat remains.
