= Leipoldtia =

Scientific classification
- Kingdom: Plantae
- Clade: Tracheophytes
- Clade: Angiosperms
- Clade: Eudicots
- Order: Caryophyllales
- Family: Aizoaceae
- Subfamily: Ruschioideae
- Tribe: Ruschieae
- Genus: Leipoldtia; L.Bolus

Synonyms
- Rhopalocyclus Schwantes

Genus of plants

Leipoldtia is a genus of flowering plants belonging to the family Aizoaceae.

It is native to Namibia and the Cape Provinces (region of the South African Republic).

The genus name of Leipoldtia is in honour of C. Louis Leipoldt (1880–1947), a South African poet, dramatist, medical doctor, reporter and food expert. It was first described and published in Fl. Pl. South Africa Vol.7 on table 256 in 1927.

== Known species ==
According to Kew:

- Leipoldtia alborosea (L.Bolus) H.E.K.Hartmann & Stüber
- Leipoldtia calandra (L.Bolus) L.Bolus
- Leipoldtia compacta L.Bolus
- Leipoldtia frutescens (L.Bolus) H.E.K.Hartmann
- Leipoldtia gigantea Klak
- Leipoldtia klaverensis L.Bolus
- Leipoldtia laxa L.Bolus
- Leipoldtia lunata H.E.K.Hartmann & S.Rust
- Leipoldtia nevillei Klak
- Leipoldtia rosea L.Bolus
- Leipoldtia schultzei (Schltr. & Diels) Friedrich
- Leipoldtia uniflora L.Bolus
- Leipoldtia weigangiana (Dinter) Dinter & Schwantes ex H.Jacobsen
