= Biedouw Valley =

Coordinates: 32°07′40.8″S 19°20′05.2″E

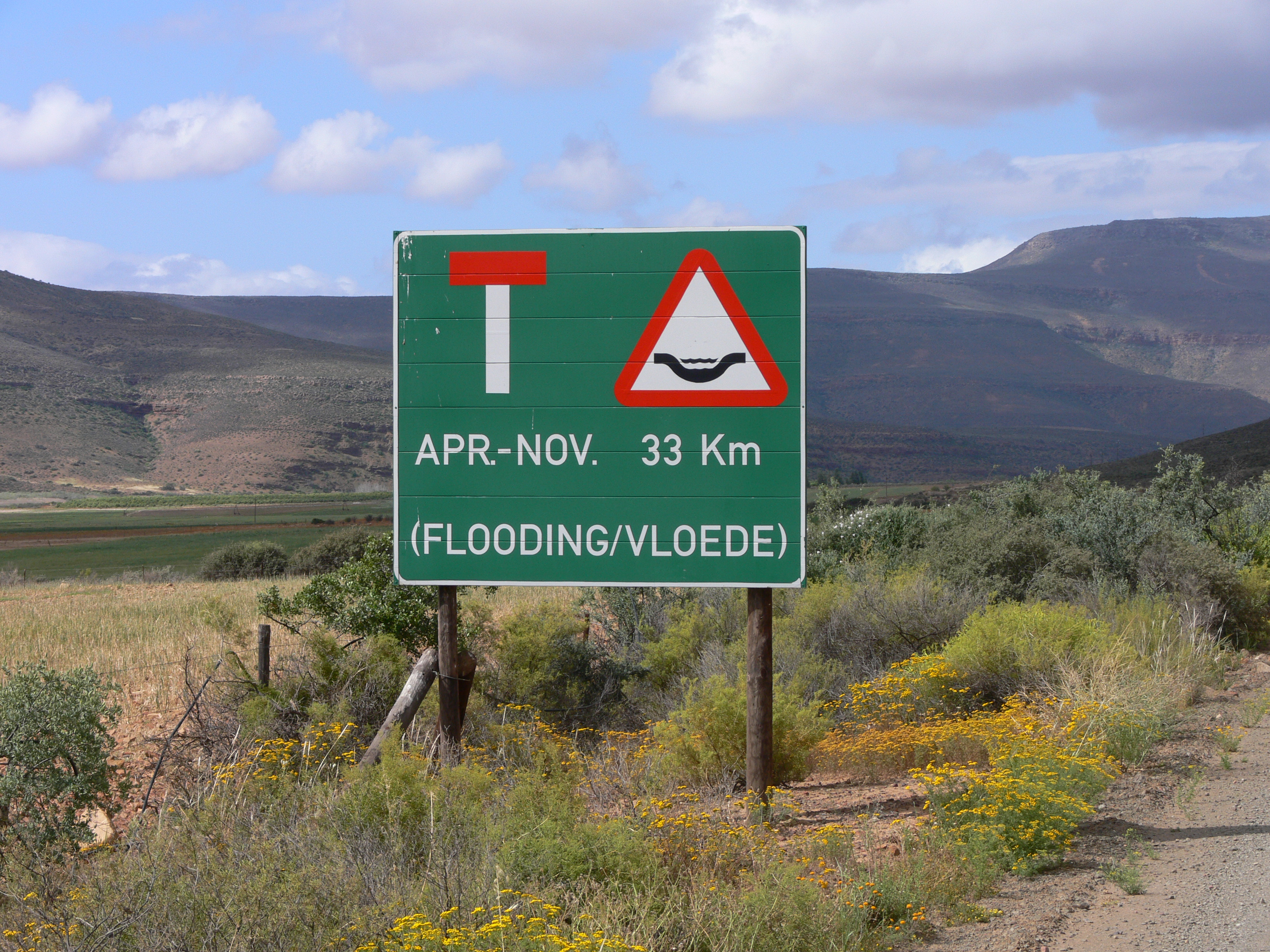
Road in Biedouw Valley

Biedouw Valley is a valley situated in the Western Cape province of South Africa at an elevation of 376 m. It is located near Pakhuis Pass, between Clanwilliam and Uitspankraal.

The name, Biedouw, originates from the Khoi name for the poisonous Milkbush, Euphorbia mauritanica, which is common in the valley
