= Dingaan =

Dingane ka Senzangakhona Zulu (c. 1795–29 January 1840), commonly referred to as Dingane or Dingaan, was a Zulu chief who became king of the Zulu Kingdom in 1828.

Dingaan is also a given name and may refer to:

- Dingaan Myolwa, South African politician
- Dingaan Thobela (born 1966), South African boxer

== See also ==
- Day of the Vow, originally called Dingane's Day or Dingaansdag
- Dingaanstat, mission station of the Dutch Reformed Church, formerly a village in South Africa
- Dingana dingana, a species of butterfly
