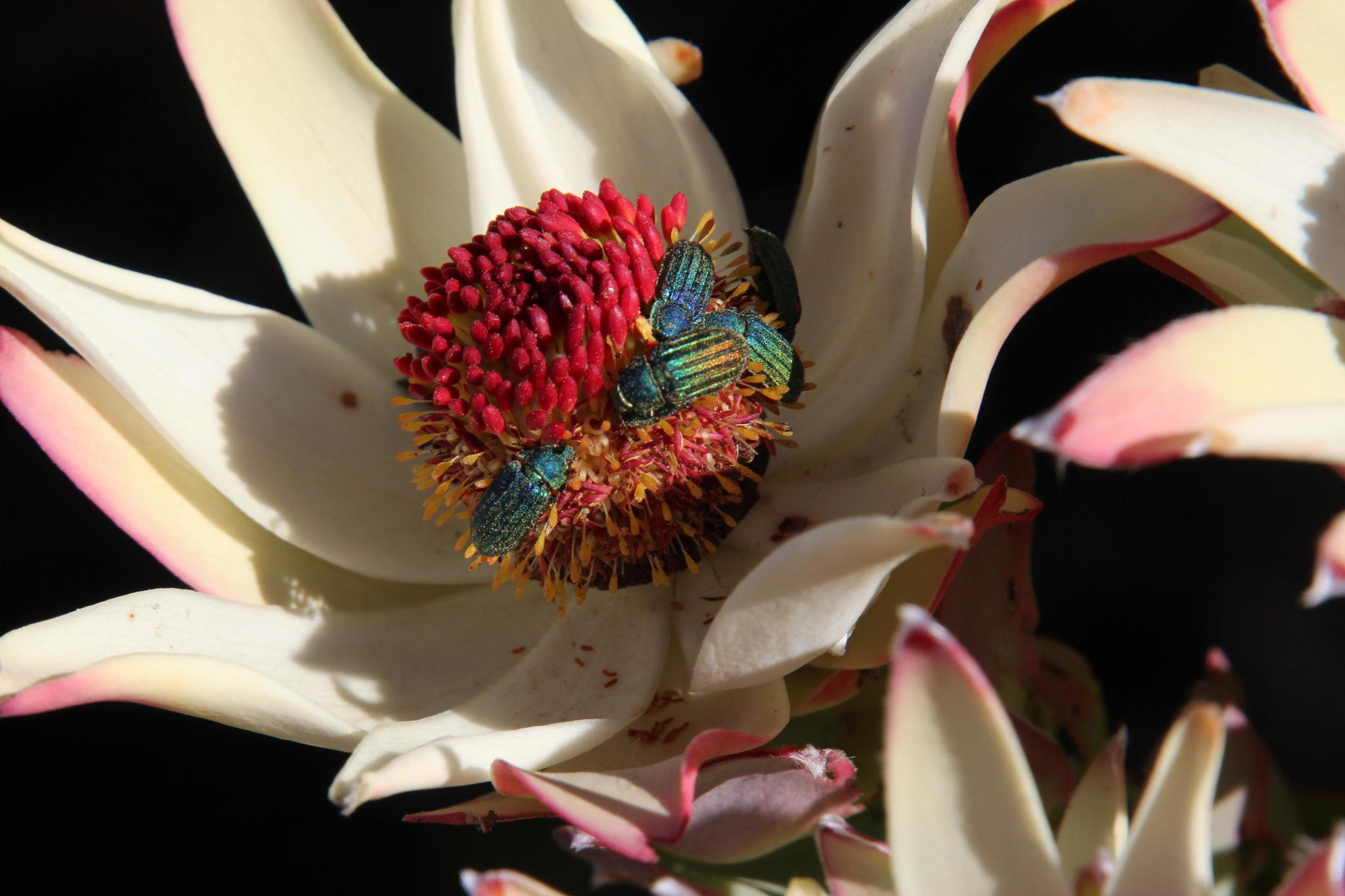

Conservation status
- Vulnerable (IUCN 3.1)

Scientific classification
- Kingdom: Plantae
- Clade: Tracheophytes
- Clade: Angiosperms
- Clade: Eudicots
- Order: Proteales
- Family: Proteaceae
- Genus: Leucadendron
- Species: L. procerum

Binomial name
- Leucadendron procerum (Salisb. ex Knight) I.Williams

= Leucadendron procerum =

Species of plant

Leucadendron procerum, the ivory conebush, is a flower-bearing shrub that belongs to the genus Leucadendron and forms part of the fynbos. The plant is native to the Western Cape, South Africa.

== Description ==
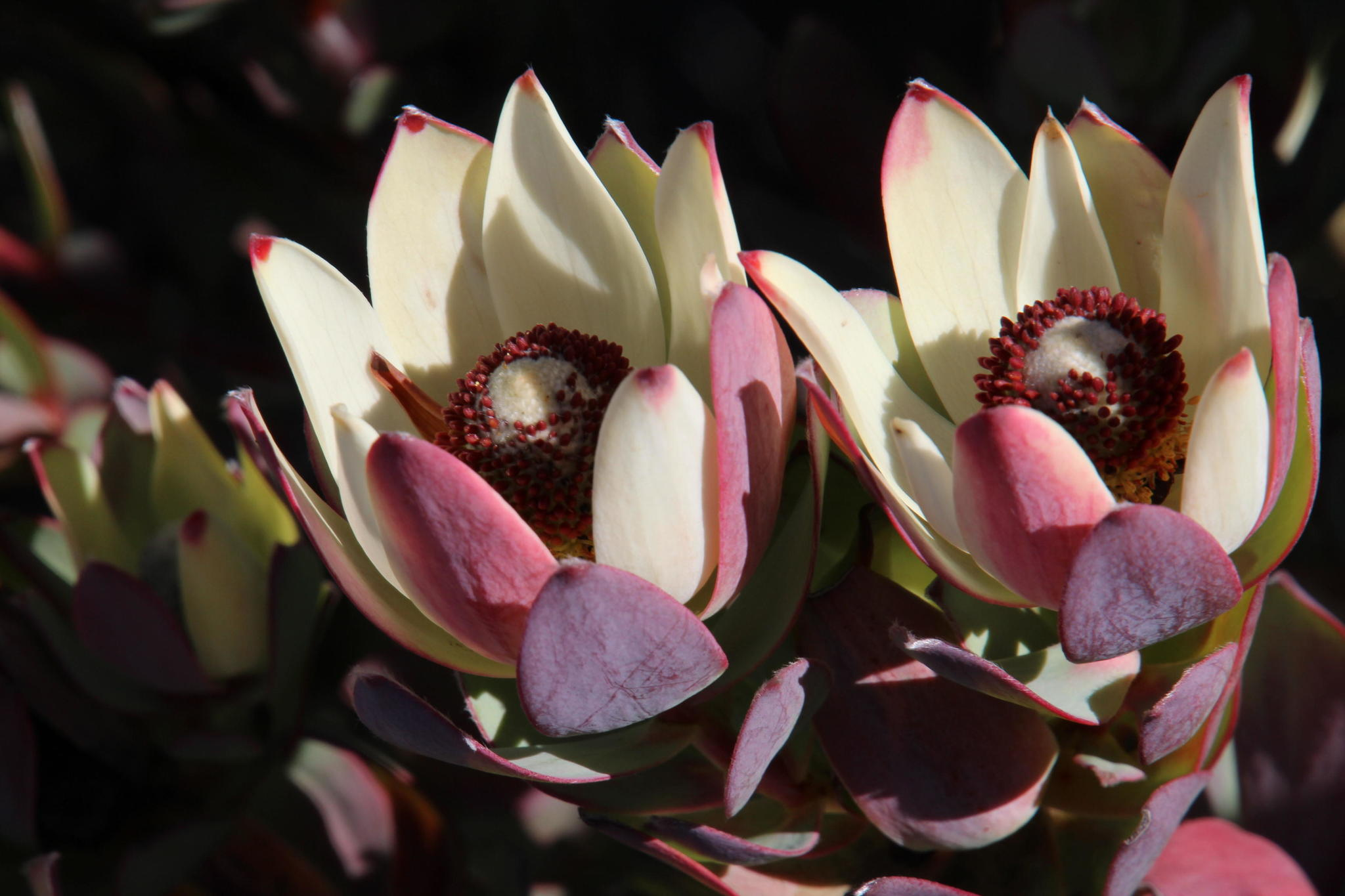

The shrub grows 3 m (9.8 ft) tall and flowers in August. The plant dies in a fire but the seeds survive. The seeds are stored in a toll on the female plant and fall to the ground after a fire and are spread by the wind, the seeds have wings. The plant is unisexual and there are separate plants with male and female flowers, which are pollinated by insects. The plant's national number is 81.2.

In Afrikaans, it is known as langbeentjie.

== Distribution and habitat ==
The plant occurs on the Bokkeveld Carp, Gifberg, Cederberg, to the Olifants River Mountains and the northern Sandveld. It grows mainly in sandstone sand at altitudes of 300–670 m (980–2,200 ft).

== Gallery ==
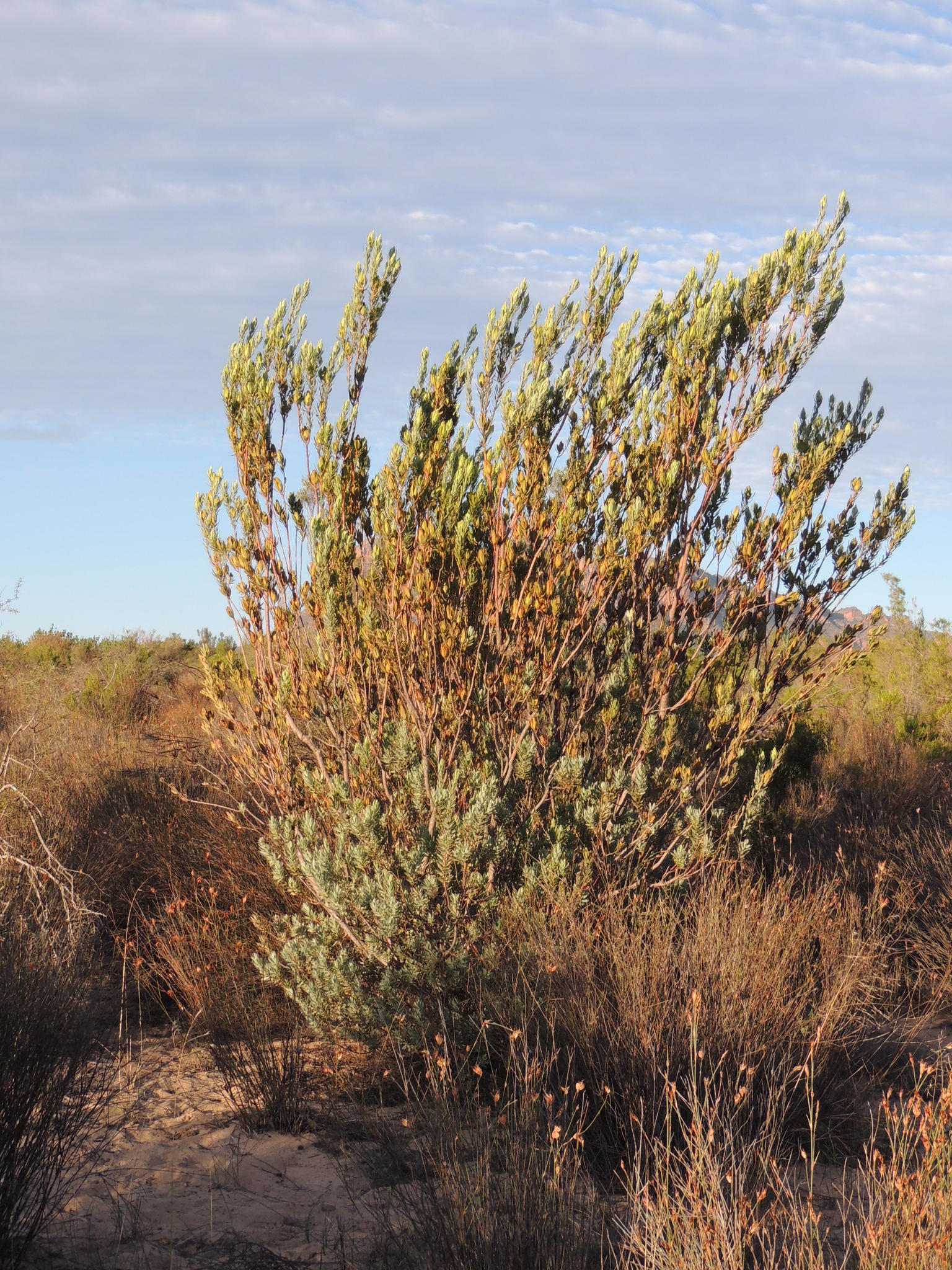

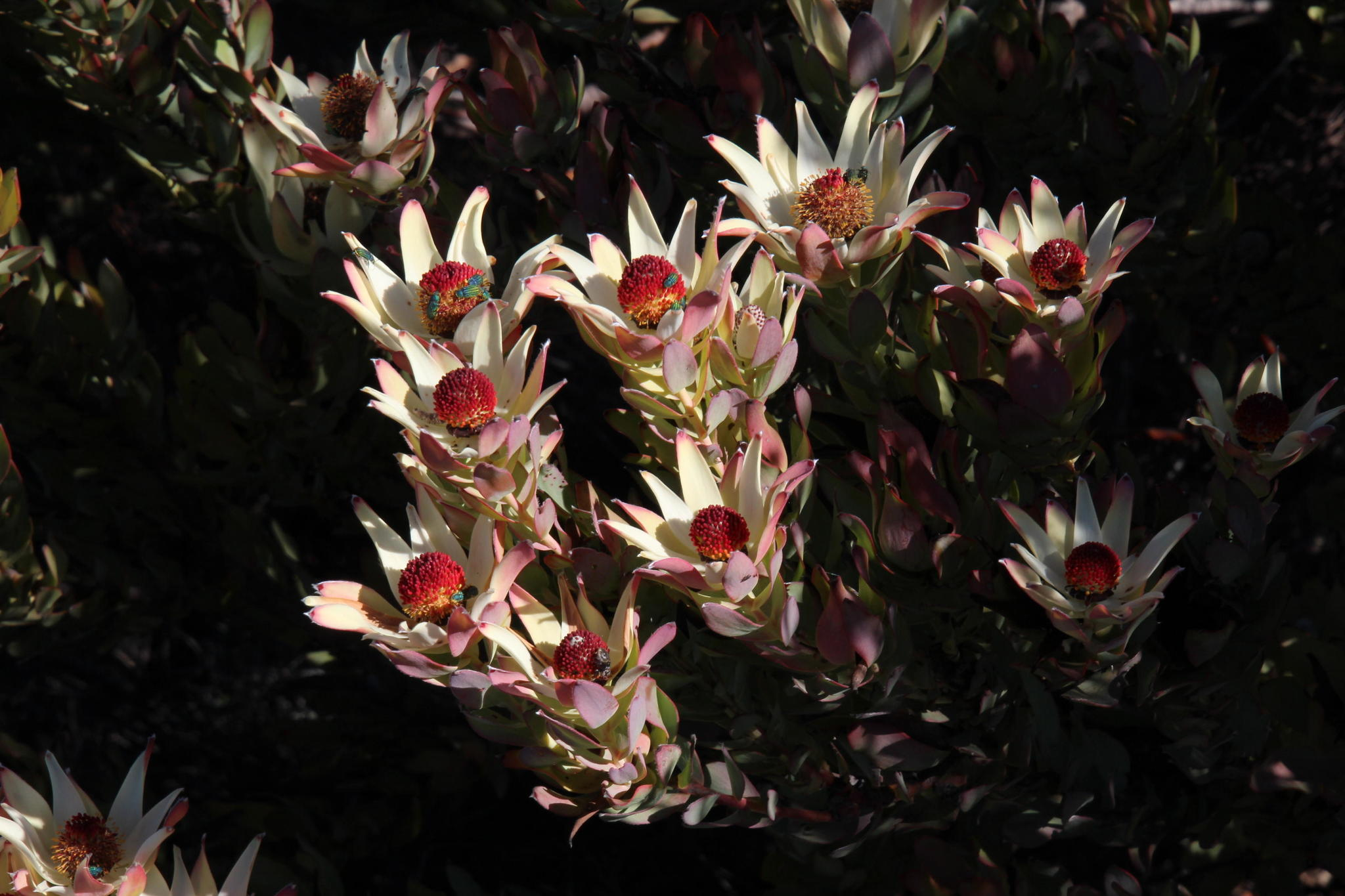

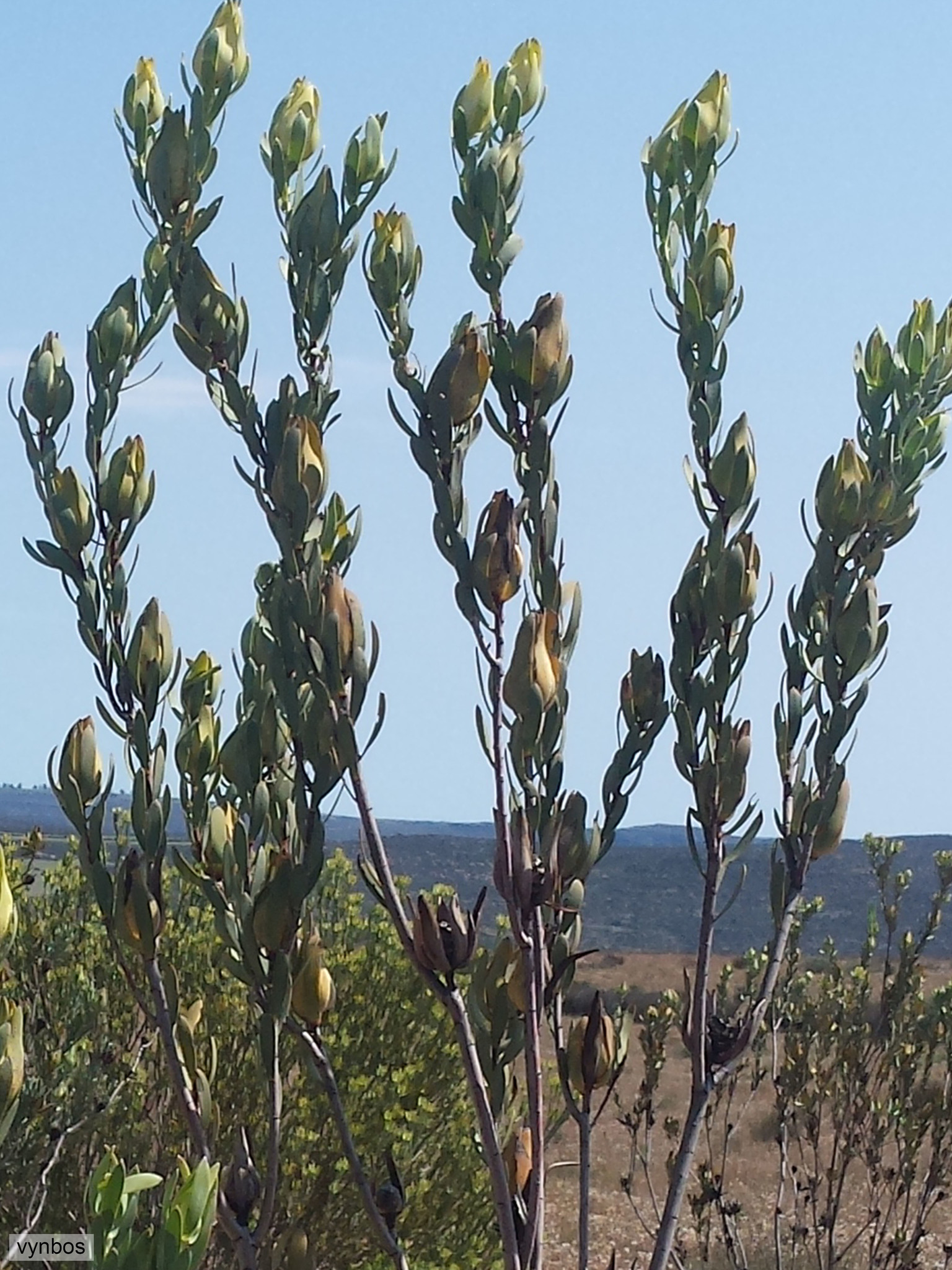

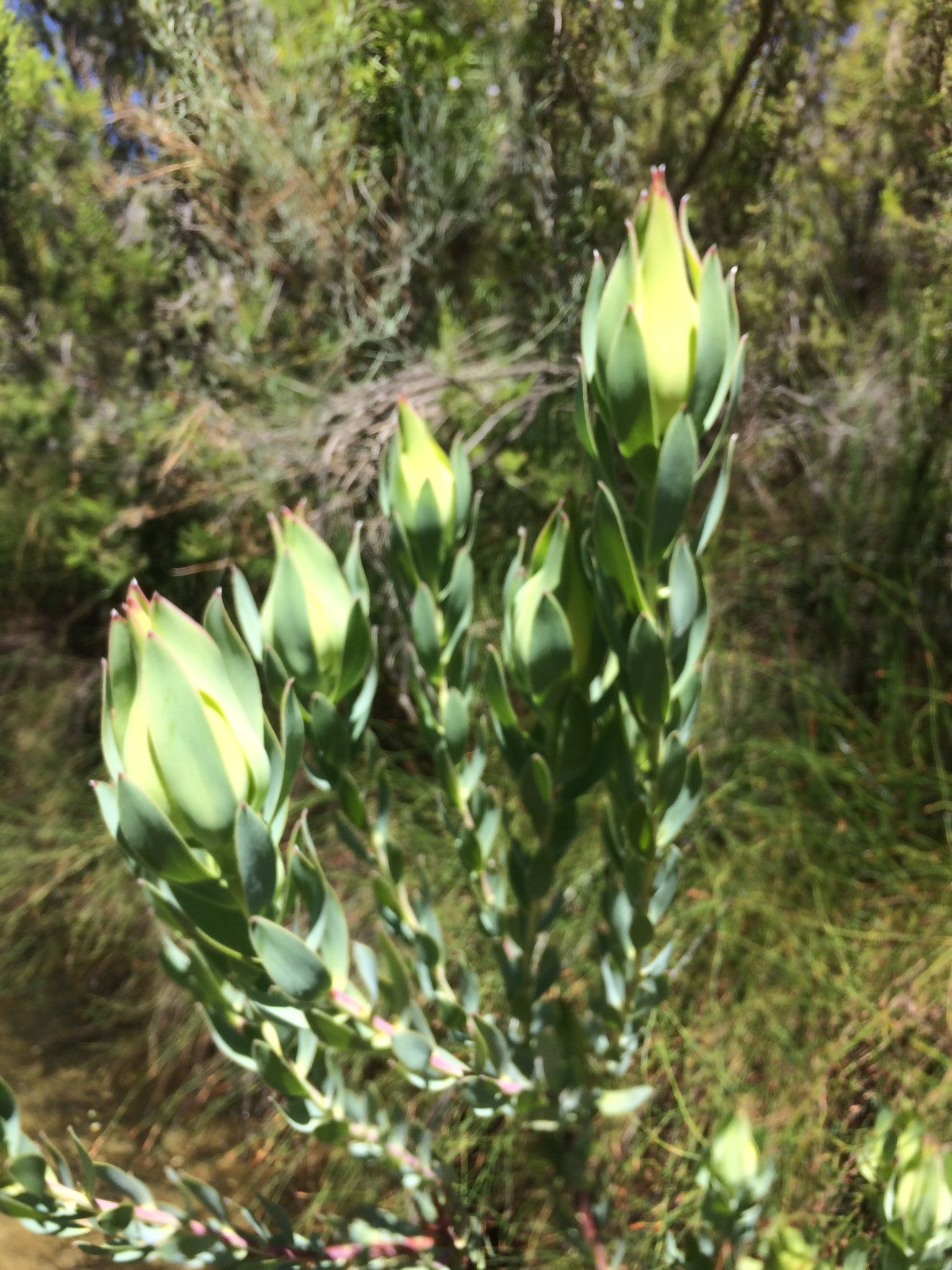

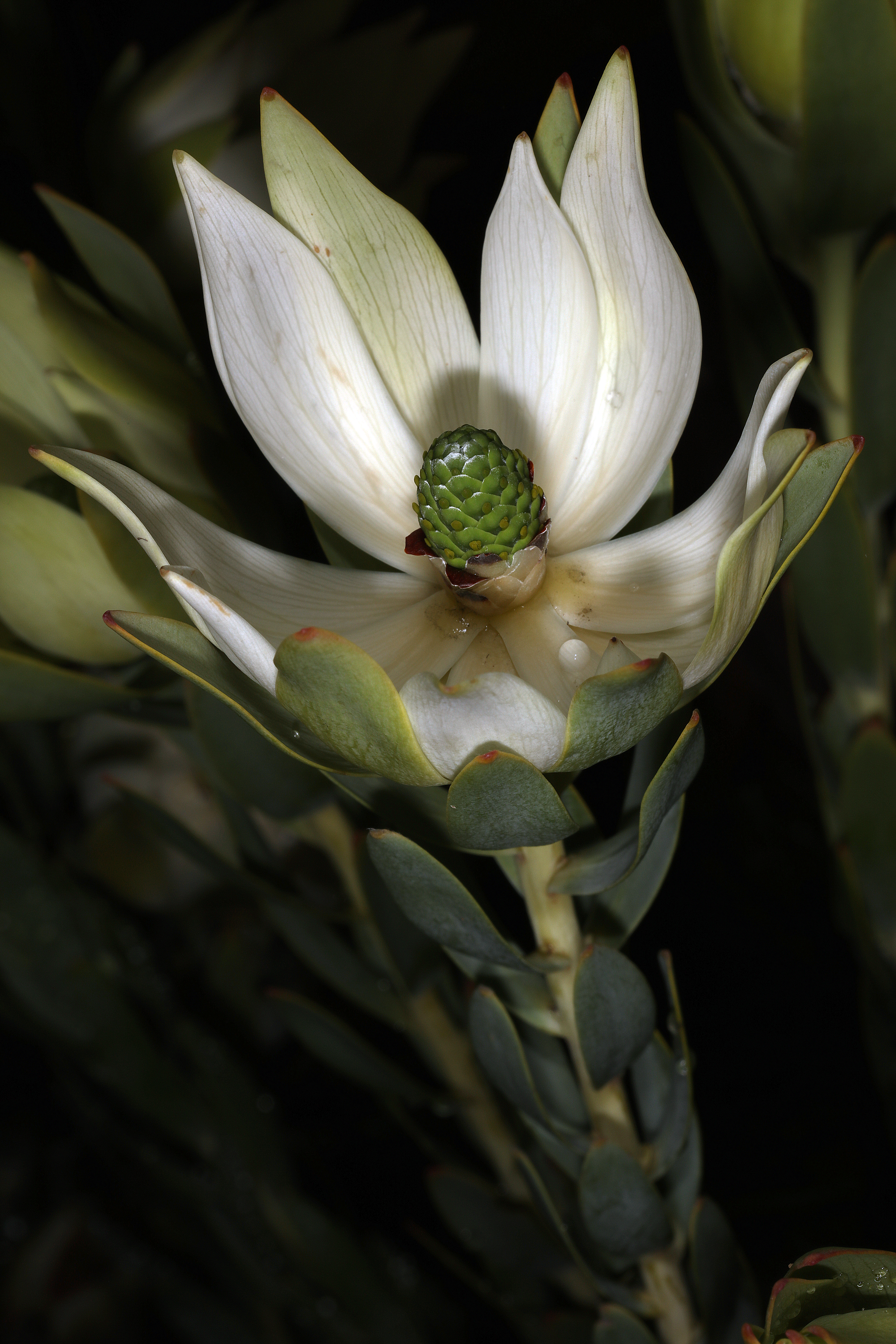
