= Johann Franz Drège =

German botanist (1794–1881)

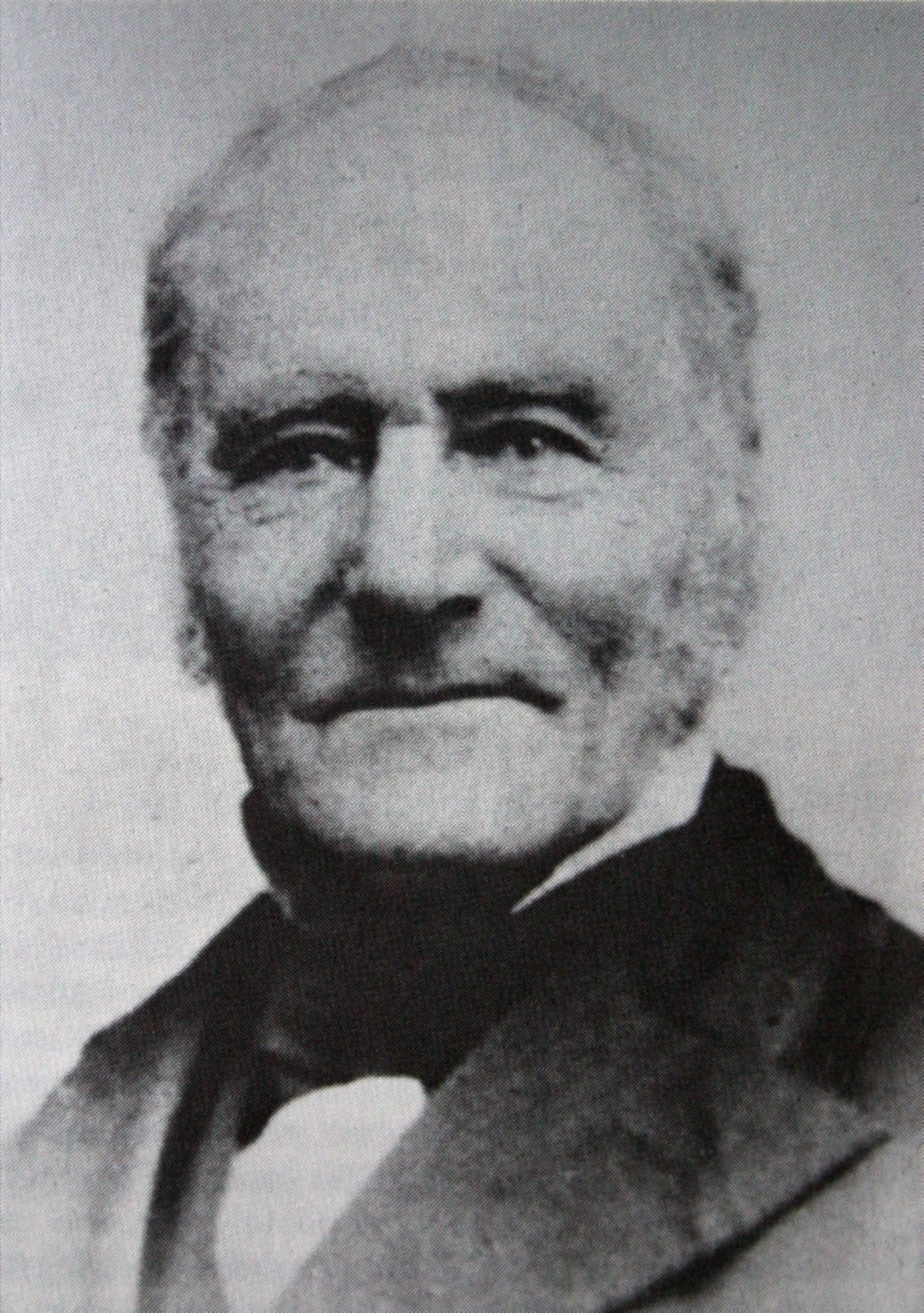

Johann Fran(t)z Drège (or Jean François Drège) (25 March 1794 Altona, Duchy of Holstein – 3 February 1881 Altona, Hamburg, Germany), commonly referred to by his standard botanical author abbreviation Drège, was a German horticulturalist, botanical collector and explorer of Huguenot descent.

Drège received his first training in horticulture at Göttingen and subsequently worked at botanical gardens in Munich, Berlin, St. Petersburg and Riga.

In 1826 he travelled with his younger brother, Eduard, to join his older brother, Carl, who had been working as an apothecary in the Cape since 1821. They established themselves as professional natural history collectors, with Carl concentrating on zoological and Franz on botanical specimens. Their contract with their European contacts expired in 1826, and they decided to launch their own business.

== August 1826 – May 1827 ==
After starting his collecting career in Cape Town and the surrounding areas, Franz set out on his first journey to the interior. His itinerary included the following places: Hex River Pass, Beaufort West, Nuweveld Mountains, Rhenosterkop, Uitvlugt, Murraysburg district, Winterveld, Richmond district, Groot Tafelberg, Nieuwejaarsfontein, Ezelsfontein and De Aar. He followed almost the same route on the return leg of his journey, and was back in Paarl on 16 May 1827. Carl sold his apothecary in Paarl in 1829 and Franz, who had been collecting in the vicinity, decided to go with him on the first of a number of shared trips.

== May 1829 – February 1830 ==
Their journey on this particular expedition took them along the following route: Hex River Mountains, Swartberg, Klaarstroom, Aasvogelberg near Willowmore, Swanepoelspoort, Swartruggens, Sundays River, Graaff-Reinet, Sneeuberg, Kompasberg, Renosterberg near Middelburg, Cradock, Suurberg, Uitenhage. Here they met up with Joachim Brehm and Ecklon; Ecklon accompanying them on a number of short excursions. The return trip was along the Langkloof and Outeniqua Mountains to Attaquaskloof and Swellendam.

== June 1830 – January 1831 ==
Having been granted permission to travel to the northern border of the Cape Colony, they set off with two ox-wagons on 16 June 1830. On this occasion they travelled via the following places: Swartland, Riebeek Kasteel, Piketberg, Stinkfontein, Clanwilliam, Olifants River, Heerenlogement, Swartdorings River, Garies, Buffels Rivier, Silverfontein, Koperberg near Springbok, west of the Namaqualand Mountains, Lekkersing, Natvoet, Gariep River, junction of the Fish and Orange Rivers, Arris, Grootdoorn (?Grootderm), Orange River mouth, Noagas, Kookfontein/Kokfontein which is the current Steinkopf, Koperberg, Silverfontein, Pedroskloof, Krakeelkraal, Leliefontein in the Kamiesberge, Onder Bokkeveld, Oorlogskloof, Clanwilliam and Wupperthal where they met up with Baron von Wurmb, joining him on a number of short trips, then on to Pikenierskloof, Piketberg, Tiger Valley, Vier-en-Twintig Riviere, Nieuwe Roode Sandkloof (Tulbagh) and back in Paarl on 19 January 1831. From 18 May till 18 June 1831, Carl revisited the Cederberg and Wupperthal on horseback.

== July 1831 – June 1832 ==
This trip took the brothers as far east as Port Natal. They followed a route through Caledon, Swellendam, a short diversion to Potberg, Mossel Bay, George, Knysna where they visited George Rex and Carolus Johannes Villet (1817–1877), back at Swellendam (5 November) meeting Ecklon and Zeyher. Across the Langeberg north of Heidelberg and north-east to Caledonkloof near Calitzdorp and Cangoberg, west to Blaauwberg in the Klein Swartberg, eastward on the north side of Swartberg, Klaarstroom, north to Kammanassieberg, along Langkloof to Galgebosch near Hankey on the Gamtoos River. Here they first heard of Andrew Smith's planned expedition to Natal. Meeting up with Smith in Port Elizabeth, they found he was readily agreeable to their joining the party. Smith did not disclose his political agenda for the trip, which was a meeting with Dingaan, and welcomed the scientific cloak given by the collectors' presence. The Drège brothers spent Christmas of 1831 in Grahamstown and called on the apothecary Leopold Schmidt on his farm Glenfillan on the Brak River 20 km NE of the town. They met up with the Smith party at Trumpeters Drift on 10 January. The party was made up of 8 Europeans, 13 Hottentots, 7 horses, 4 wagons and 52 oxen. Their route crossed the Keiskamma and Buffalo Rivers, then on to Komga, Kei River, Gaikau mission station near Butterworth, Bashee River, Morley, Umtata River, Bunting mission station, Umgaza River, Umzimvubu River, Lusikisiki, Umsikaba River to its mouth, Umtentu River mouth, Umtamvuna River, Umzimkulu River and finally Port Natal on 27 March. Smith left for his meeting with Dingaan, though the Drèges did not accompany him. The return leg of the expedition followed almost the same route back and they were back at Glenfillan by 25 June.

== July 1832 – October 1832 ==
Within two weeks the brothers set off from Grahamstown via Addo, Port Elizabeth, Uitenhage, Enon Mission, Zuurberg, following the Sundays River to Buffelsfontein near Jansenville, Swanepoelspoort, Aasvogelberg near Willowmore, Kammanassie Mountains, through the Langkloof, Essenbos, Gamtoos River, Port Elizabeth and Enon Mission.

== October 1832 – May 1833 ==
The brothers Drège immediately prepared for their next expedition and shortly left Enon, travelling through Grahamstown, Fort Beaufort, Katberg Pass, Moravian Mission Station Shiloh, where they met Zeyher on 28 November, across the Stormberg, along Stormbergspruit/Sternbergspruit, Kraanberg/Kraamberg, Buffel Vallei at Aliwal North, across the Kraai River, Riet Vallei at Witteberg, across Bamboesspruit and Sterkspruit, Kornet Spruit on the border of Basutoland, back to Riet Vallei, Bamboeshoek near Lady Grey, Melkspruit, recross Kraai River back to Buffel Vallei, across Stormbergspruit and Suurbergspruit, Colesberg, along Seekoei River, Sneeuwberg, Graaff-Reinet, along Sundays River, Blaauwkrantz and back at Enon on 12 March. Here they spent some time collecting in the Suurberg before returning to Cape Town via Gamtoos River, Langkloof to George, Swellendam, Genadendal, Paarl on 14 May 1833. Carl Drège left for Europe on 7 July 1833 aboard the "Porcupine" with a large collection of specimens, and returned to Cape Town in January 1836. During Carl's absence, Franz made another trip to Clanwilliam and the mountains of Vanrhynsdorp, before returning to Europe in 1834.

== Summary ==
Drège's specimens typically had details of the collection site, such as altitude and other geophysical information. The quality of his collecting is only matched by that of William Burchell. In his Zwei Pflanzengeographische Documente (Leipzig 1843), he lists the species he collected alphabetically with cross references to localities. In an introduction by the Prussian Ernst H. F. Meyer (1791–1858), who was at that time professor of botany at Königsberg, an attempt is made for the first time to divide the vegetation of the Cape Colony into phytogeographical zones. Rudolf Marloth referred to him as "the father of South African phytogeography". Harry Bolus and Peter MacOwan praised his meticulous collecting and his astounding zest in covering vast areas of the countryside. In total he collected over 200 000 specimens embracing some 8 000 species. He is commemorated in Dregea Eckl. & Zeyh., Neodregea from the family Colchicaceae and numerous species. The routes taken on his expeditions were considerably clarified by the discovery in about 1937 of Carl Drège's detailed diary.

On his return to Europe he settled near Hamburg from where he managed a successful nursery business. He married Johanna Alida Vlaar, also from his hometown of Altona, on 2 December 1837.
