= C. Louis Leipoldt =

South African poet (1880–1947)

C. Louis Leipoldt FRCS
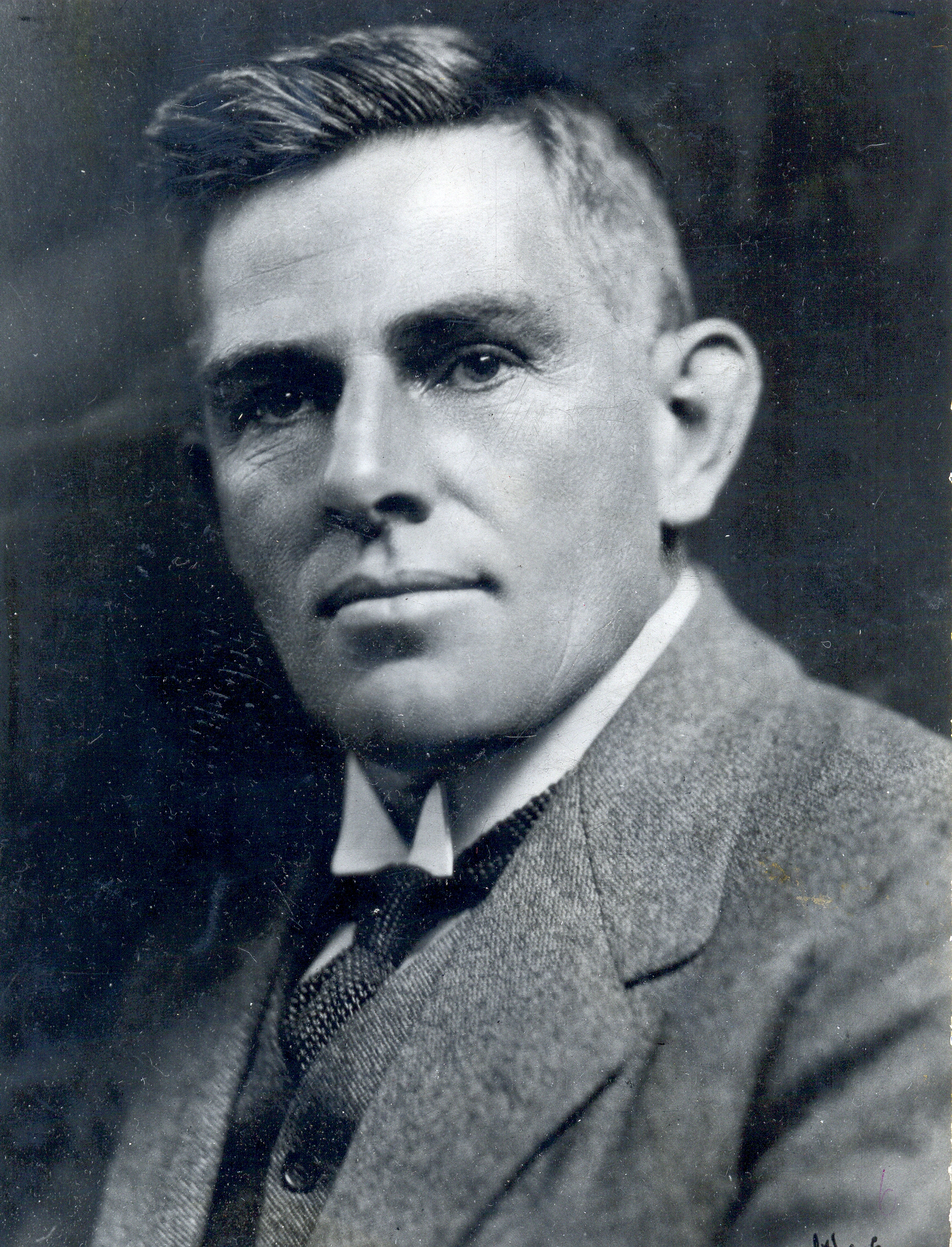
- Leipoldt c. 1915
- Born: Christian Frederik Louis Leipoldt; Worcester, Cape Colony
- Died: Cape Town
- Resting place: Pakhuis Pass, Clanwilliam; 32.13534508603454°S 18.990598513543244°E
- Education: London Conjoint (M.R.eS., L.R.C.P.), Fellowship of the Royal Colleges of Surgeons (FRCS)
- Alma mater: Guy's hospital
- Children: Jeffery Barnet Leipoldt (Adopted)
- Writing career
- Pen name: Pheidippides, Africanus, CLL, FWB, FW Bancombe, FW Baxter, FW Baxcombe, GMK and KAR Bonade
- Language: Afrikaans, English
- Notable awards: Hertzog Prize for Poetry 1934 SkoonheidsTroos; Hertzog Prize for Drama 1944 Die heks and Die laaste aand
- Movement: Second Afrikaans Movement

Christian Frederik Louis Leipoldt (/ˈlaɪpɒlt/ LY-polt; 28 December 1880 – 12 April 1947), usually referred to as C. Louis Leipoldt, was a South African poet, dramatist, medical doctor, reporter and food expert. Together with Jan F. E. Celliers and J. D. du Toit, he was one of the leading figures in the poetry of the Second Afrikaans Movement. Apart from poetry, Leipoldt wrote novels, plays, stories, children's books, cookbooks and a travel diary. He is numbered amongst the greatest of the Afrikaner poets and was described by D. J. Opperman, himself a noted South African poet, as "our most versatile artist".

== Biography ==
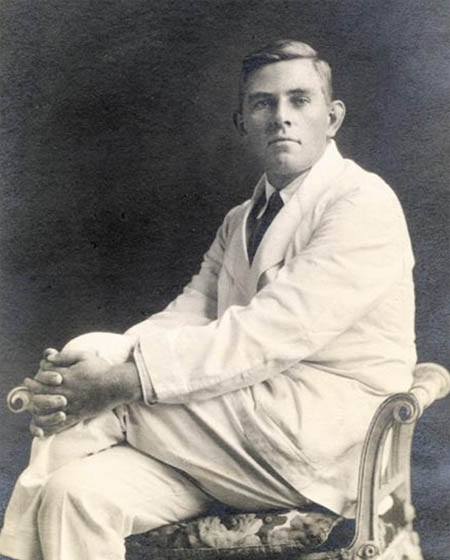
Leipoldt c. 1925

Leipoldt was born in Worcester in the Cape Colony, the son of a preacher, Christian Friedrich Leipoldt, of the NG Kerk in Clanwilliam and grandson of the Rhenish missionary, Johann Gottlieb Leipoldt, who founded Wupperthal in the Cederberg. His mother was Anna Meta Christiana Esselen, daughter of Louis Franz Esselen (1817–1893), another Rhenish missionary at Worcester. His early education was largely at home and for a while, during the Second Boer War, he was a reporter. Between 1902 and 1907, with funding from the botanist Harry Bolus, he read medicine at Guy's Hospital in London and travelled in Europe, America and the East Indies. At times his health was poor. For a period of some six months during 1908, he was the personal physician of the American newspaper magnate, Joseph Pulitzer, aboard Pulitzer's yacht.

Later Leipoldt's career was varied. For a period he was a school medical doctor in London before becoming the Medical Inspector of Schools in the Transvaal and then in the Cape Province. He returned to journalism for a while (1923) but finally settled down as a paediatrician in Cape Town in 1925. He never married. He died in Cape Town but, because of his deep love for the Hantam— a mountainous and wild district north of Cape Town— his ashes were laid to rest in the rugged Pakhuis Pass (Storehouse Pass), near Clanwilliam.

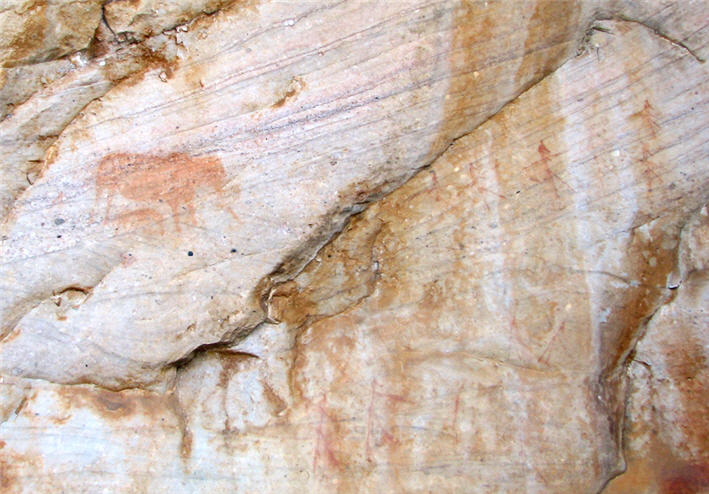
Faint rock art above the grave

His grave is situated at the base of a cave-like opening on the mountain face. Directly above his tombstone there are faint drawings on the sandstone that were made by Bushmen many years before his death. Leipoldt had an adopted son, Jeffery Barnet Leipoldt. Jeffery died on 21 November 1997. His ashes were scattered on his father's grave. Jeffery has three daughters, Nerina, Karen and Desre, who live in Johannesburg, South Africa.

== Poetry ==
The Worst Horror

This is the bitterest thing of all my day,

That which I have loved so well, that now is dead
And in a coffin laid away, of lead

And cedarwood, immortal somewhere stays,
Or as a ghost-cloud goes its lonely ways

By strange and boundless forces urged ahead,
Perhaps, like me, forlorn, uncomforted,

But out of reach, howe'er one pleads or prays,
Day after day with unending lament.

This is the bitterest thing, that I no hand

Can reach to help, or comfort to impart,

No aid can give, and no encouragement;

And that there wanders in that ghostly land

Forlorn, that which I loved with all my heart!

(translated by C. J. D Harvey)

Leipoldt wrote much about nature in general and in particular about the landscapes and legends of his beloved Hantam. His poetry also deals with the suffering caused by the Second Boer War and the culture and values of the Cape Malays. Most of his work does not translate well into English.

== Dietetics ==
Leipoldt authored the book Common-Sense Dietetics in 1911. In the book he argued against total abstainers from both alcohol and meat. Leipoldt heavily criticized vegetarianism. A review in the British Medical Journal commented that "We cannot help doubting whether all the author's opinions so dogmatically expressed are based upon an experience that can justify them, for many of his comments suggest that he is speaking rather from hearsay than from personal knowledge. Nevertheless, he has written a lively and entertaining book, which we have no doubt will find many admirers among those who wish to eat and drink well."

In 1936, Leipoldt updated his book under the title The Belly Book. A review of the book concluded that its chapter on diet and disease is "useless both to the doctor and to the layman, and abounds in statements for which there is no scientific justification."

== Legacy ==
The C. Louis Leipoldt Medical Centre in Cape Town is named after the poet, as is the Louis Leipoldt Primary School in Lyttelton (Centurion).

In 1927, botanist L.Bolus published a genus of flowering plants from Namibia and the Cape Provinces, belonging to the family Aizoaceae, as Leipoldtia in his honour.

== Selected publications ==
- Common-Sense Dietetics (1911)
- The Belly Book: Or Diner's Guide (1936)
- Bushveld Doctor (1937)
- 300 Years of Cape Wine (1974)
- Leipoldt's Cape Cookery (1976)
