= Pakhuis Pass =

South African mountain pass

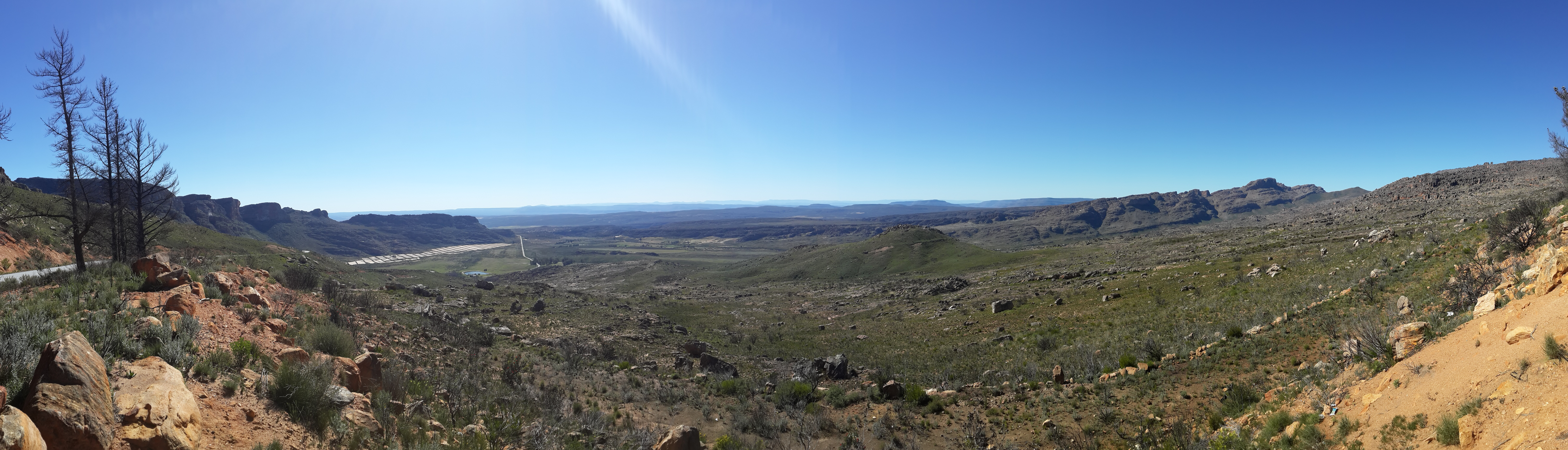
- View from Pakhuis Pass
- Interactive map of Pakhuis Pass
- Length: 25 km (16 mi)

Third Approach
- Location: Between Clanwilliam and Calvinia
- Range: Cederberg
- Coordinates: 32.13321°S 19.03361°E

Pakhuis Pass is a mountain pass on the R364 in the northern Cederberg in South Africa. The pass connects Clanwilliam to Calvinia. A turnoff from the pass heads southeast to the Biedouw Valley and Wupperthal. The pass is 25 km long, reaches an altitude of 905 m at a gradient of 1:9.

== History ==
The pass was built between 1875 and 1877 by Thomas Bain. The pass was improved for the first time in the 1960s and was tarred in 2009.

In December 1946, a Junkers Ju 86 aircraft (flight SAAF 647) of the South African Air Force crashed into the 1 077 Pakhuis Peak in misty weather, killing everyone on board. The plane was on route to Cape Town from Pretoria with a cargo of plywood.

== Features ==
During construction, Thomas Bain discovered many important San rock paintings in the area. The grave of the poet C. Louis Leipoldt is situated on the pass 15 km from Clanwilliam. There are also a number of hiking routes in the area.
