= Wupperthal =

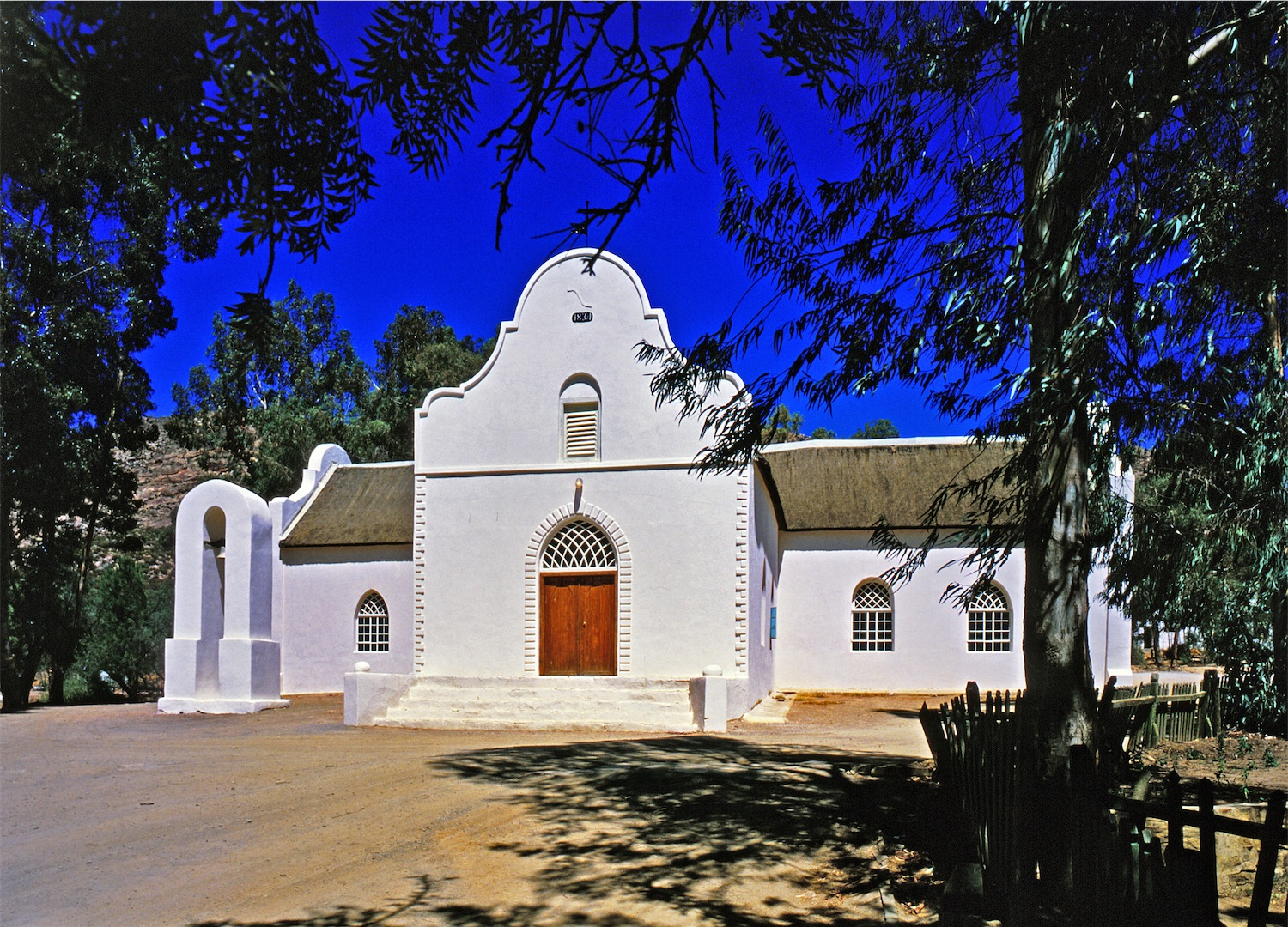
- Church in Wuppertal

- Location within Western Cape Location within South Africa
- Coordinates: 32°16′27″S 19°12′33″E
- Country: South Africa
- Province: Western Cape
- District: West Coast
- Municipality: Cederberg

Population
  - Total: 1,568

Racial Makeup (2011)
  - Coloured: 97.26%
  - Black African: 1.80%
  - Other: 0.94%

First languages (2011)
  - Afrikaans: 96.77%
  - English: 1.66%
  - Other: 1.57%
- Time zone: UTC+2 (SAST)
- Postal code (street): 8138
- PO box: 8138

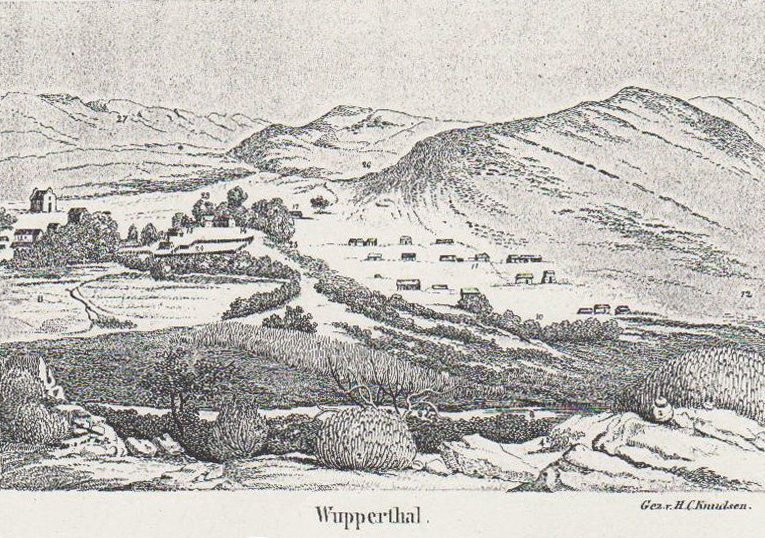
Sketch of Wupperthal by the Norwegian missionary, Hans Christian Knudsen

Wupperthal (sometimes also spelt Wuppertal) is a small town in the Cederberg mountains in the Western Cape province of South Africa. It was founded in 1830 by two German missionaries of the Rhenish Missionary Society (Rheinische Mission), Theobald von Wurmb and Johann Gottlieb Leipoldt, grandfather of C. Louis Leipoldt – some 100 years before the city of Wuppertal was formally established in Germany. In 1965, after the Rhenish Mission had gradually scaled down their activities in Southern Africa over a period of 40 years, a decision was taken that Wupperthal in the future should become part of the Moravian Church, which by that stage had already made the transition from a mission to an autonomous church in South Africa. The town remains a Moravian mission station to this day.

== Village life ==
The village remains isolated and is accessible by a gravel road from Clanwilliam over the Pakhuis Pass. Community facilities include the Moravian Church, a shop, a tea room, a post office, a school with two hostels, and a community hall.

Most families in the community are dependent on small-scale agriculture or livestock farming for their livelihood. The most important cash crop is rooibos tea. The mountainous areas surrounding the village provide grazing for goats.

In its heyday the shoe factory, founded by Johann Leipoldt himself, provided work for many skilled craftsmen. The Wupperthal handsewn veldskoen (traditional soft suede shoes) were for nearly a century famous across South Africa for their comfort and good craftsmanship. A tannery and a glove factory were also in operation for many years. The shoe factory still exists today but operates on a much smaller scale.

Tourism is a growing industry for Wupperthal, particularly during the Namaqualand flower season in August and September, when the seemingly barren mountain slopes become covered in flowers for a few weeks. A community tourism project offers self-catering chalets and a camping site. Activities include hiking, 4x4 trails, and donkey cart rides.

== 2018 Fire ==
On 31 December 2018, a wildfire swept through the village and surrounding area causing widespread devastation. The fire destroyed a majority of the buildings in the town, burning down 53 homes, a community hall, a clinic, a restaurant, and the historic Moravian Mission Station, leaving only the town's church and a few other buildings remaining. One woman was badly burnt in the fire and later succumbed to her injuries. Jackie Valentyn, aged 57, died at Tygerberg Hospital a month after the fire. Telecommunications infrastructure was also damaged in the fire, causing difficulty in communication. The fire left 200 residents homeless.
