= Pterartoria caldaria =

Montagu Pterartoria wolf spider

Scientific classification
- Kingdom: Animalia
- Phylum: Arthropoda
- Subphylum: Chelicerata
- Class: Arachnida
- Order: Araneae
- Infraorder: Araneomorphae
- Family: Lycosidae
- Genus: Pterartoria
- Species: P. caldaria

Binomial name
- Pterartoria caldaria Purcell, 1903

Synonyms
- Pterartoriola caldaria Roewer, 1955

Species of spider

Pterartoria caldaria is a species of spider in the family Lycosidae. It is endemic to South Africa and is commonly known as the Montagu Pterartoria wolf spider.

== Distribution ==
Pterartoria caldaria is found in South Africa, where has been sampled from the Eastern Cape and Western Cape provinces. The species occurs at altitudes ranging from 222 to 920 m. Localities include Grahamstown, Montagu from the Hot Baths, Matjiesfontein, Laingsburg, Cederberg Wilderness Area, Anysberg Nature Reserve, Seweweekspoort, and Bontebok National Park.

== Habitat and ecology ==
Pterartoria caldaria is a free-running ground dwelling spider sampled from the Fynbos biome.

== Conservation ==
Pterartoria caldaria is listed as Least Concern by the South African National Biodiversity Institute due to its wide geographic range. Threats to the species are unknown, but it is protected in Anysberg Nature Reserve, Bontebok National Park, and Cederberg Wilderness Area.

== Taxonomy ==
Pterartoria caldaria was described by Purcell in 1903 from Montagu Baths in the Western Cape. The species was transferred to Pterartoriola by Roewer in 1955 and back to Pterartoria by Russell-Smith and Roberts in 2017, who also described the male. It is known from both sexes.
