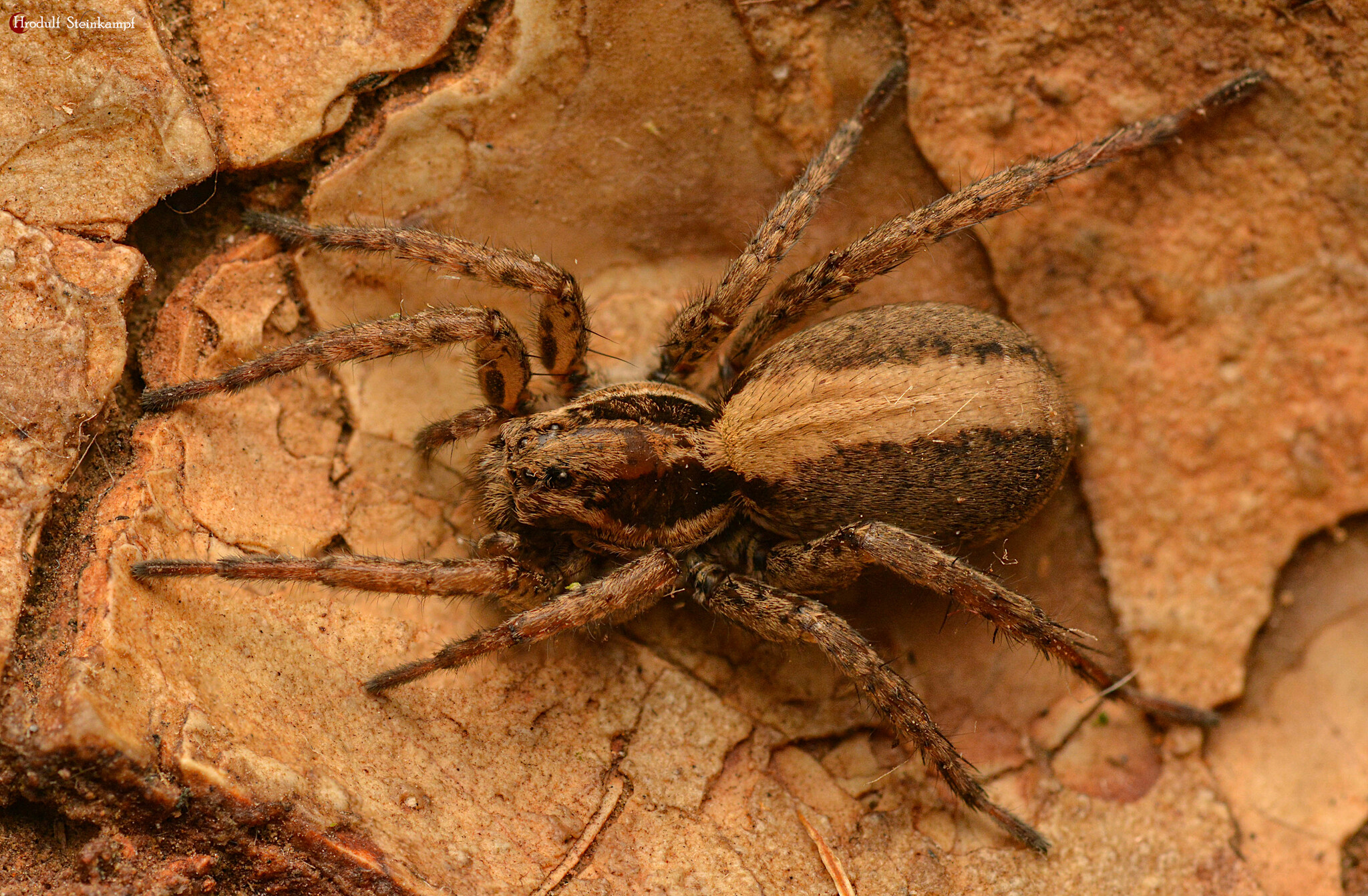
- female
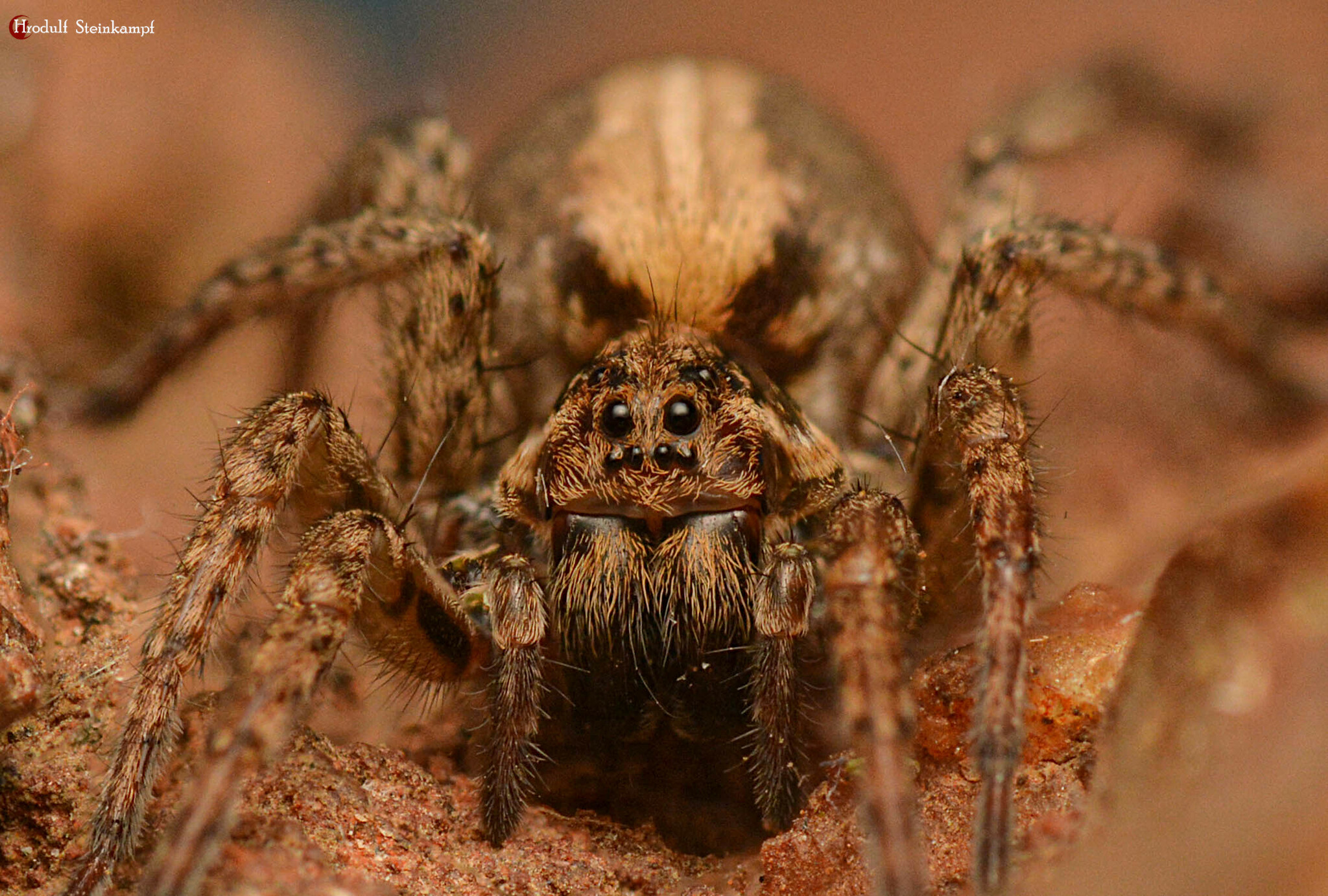
- female

Scientific classification
- Kingdom: Animalia
- Phylum: Arthropoda
- Subphylum: Chelicerata
- Class: Arachnida
- Order: Araneae
- Infraorder: Araneomorphae
- Family: Lycosidae
- Genus: Pterartoria
- Species: P. lativittata

Binomial name
- Pterartoria lativittata (Purcell, 1903)

Synonyms
- Lycosa lativittata Purcell, 1903; Pterartoriola lativittata Roewer, 1955

= Pterartoria lativittata =

Hanover Pterartoria wolf spider

Species of spider

Pterartoria lativittata is a species of spider in the family Lycosidae. It is found in southern Africa and is commonly known as the Hanover Pterartoria wolf spider.

== Distribution ==
Pterartoria lativittata is found in Lesotho and South Africa. In South Africa, it is recorded from the provinces Gauteng, Northern Cape, and Western Cape. The species occurs at altitudes ranging from 7 to 2,401 m. Localities include Randburg, Boksburg Park, Hanover, Great Winterhoek Mountains, Perdekloof, Cape near Silverstroom, Cederberg Wilderness Area at various sites, and Cape Town.

== Habitat and ecology ==
Pterartoria lativittata is a free-running ground dwelling spider recorded from Fynbos, Nama Karoo, and a variety of different grassland types.

== Description ==
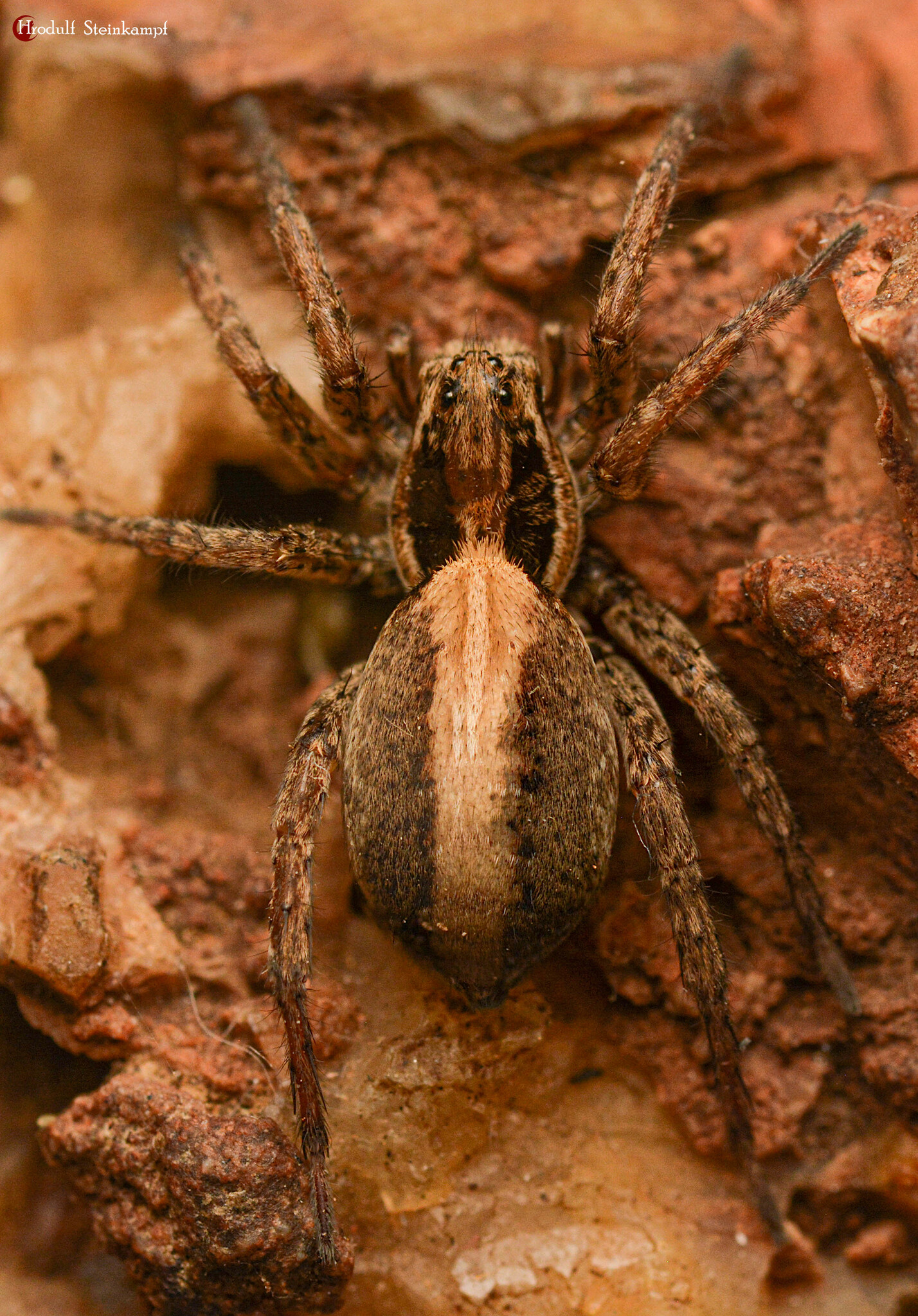
female

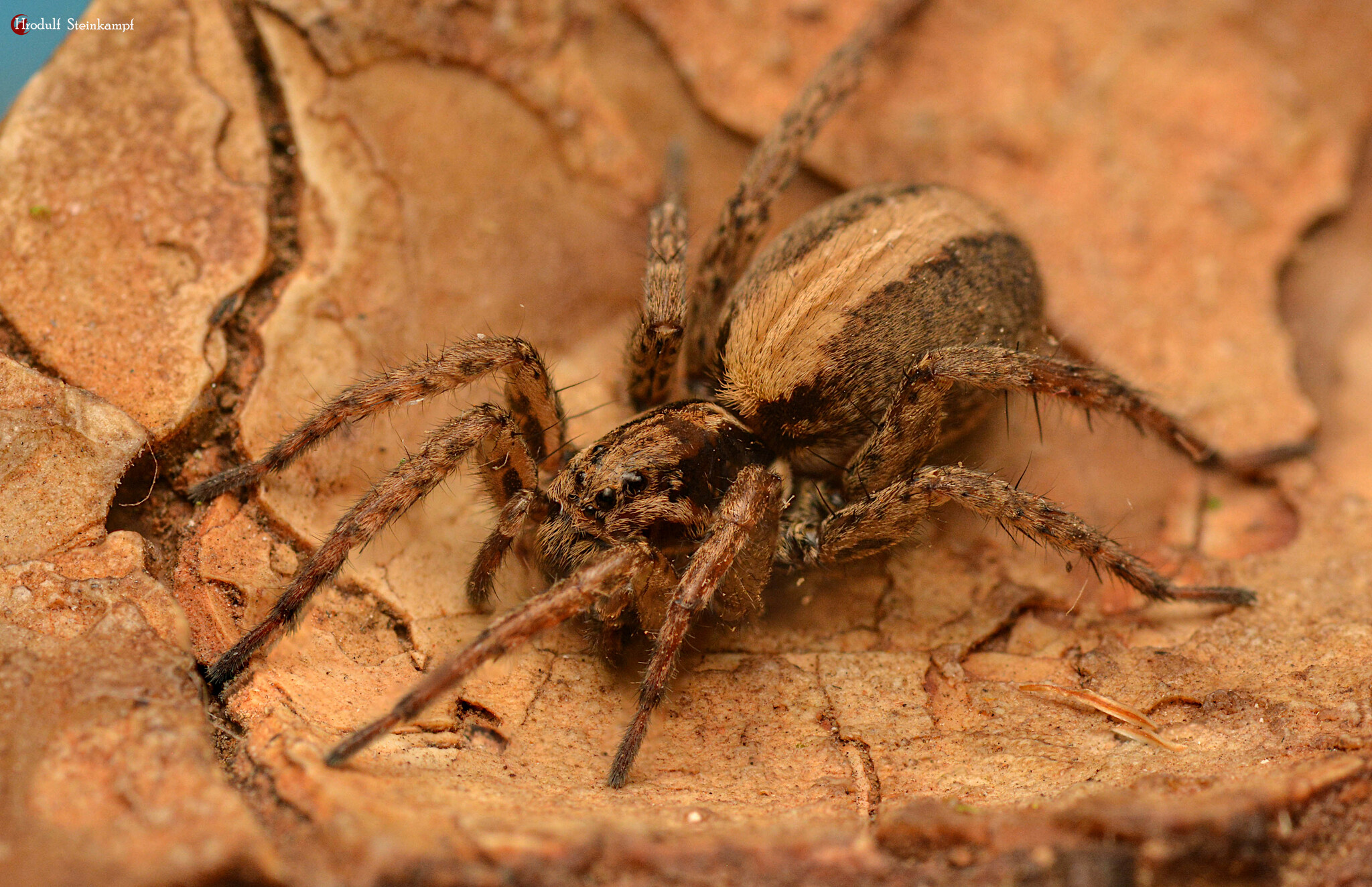
female

== Conservation ==
Pterartoria lativittata is listed as Least Concern by the South African National Biodiversity Institute due to its wide geographical range. Threats to the species are unknown and it is receiving some protection in the Cederberg Wilderness Area.

== Taxonomy ==
Pterartoria lativittata was originally described by Purcell in 1903 as Lycosa lativittata from Hanover. The species was transferred to Pterartoriola by Roewer in 1955 and back to Pterartoria by Russell-Smith and Roberts in 2017. It is known from both sexes.
