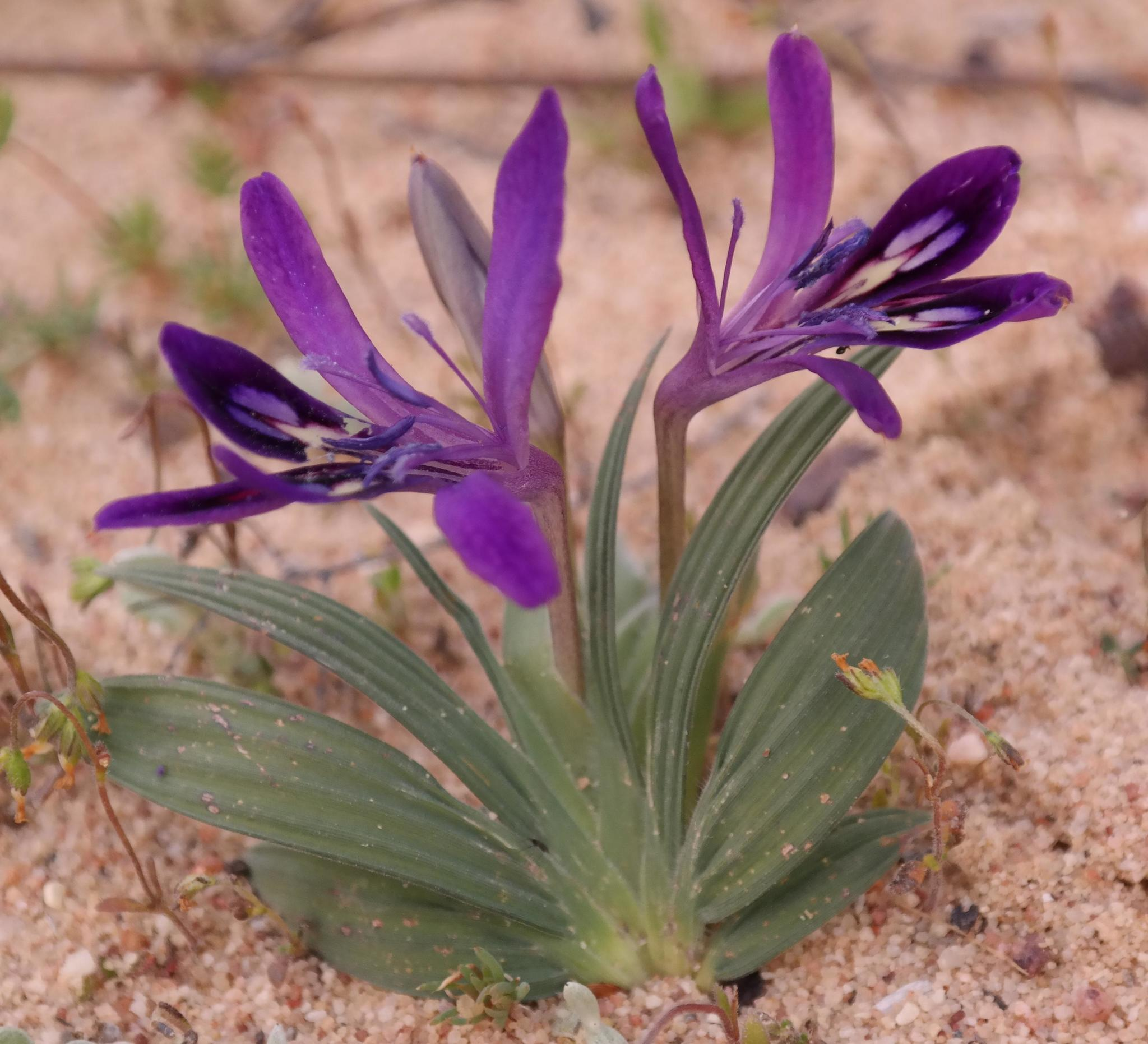

Scientific classification
- Kingdom: Plantae
- Clade: Tracheophytes
- Clade: Angiosperms
- Clade: Monocots
- Order: Asparagales
- Family: Iridaceae
- Genus: Babiana
- Species: B. geniculata

Binomial name
- Babiana geniculata G.J.Lewis

= Babiana geniculata =

Species of flowering plant

Babiana geniculata is a perennial flowering plant and geophyte belonging to the genus Babiana and is part of the fynbos. The species is endemic to the Western Cape. It occurs in the Pakhuisberg, Biedouwberg and the northern Cederberg. It has a range of less than 200 km² and the species is considered rare.
