= Pterartoria confusa =

Kamieskroon Pterartoria wolf spider

Scientific classification
- Kingdom: Animalia
- Phylum: Arthropoda
- Subphylum: Chelicerata
- Class: Arachnida
- Order: Araneae
- Infraorder: Araneomorphae
- Family: Lycosidae
- Genus: Pterartoria
- Species: P. confusa

Binomial name
- Pterartoria confusa Russell-Smith & Roberts, 2017

Species of spider

Pterartoria confusa is a species of spider in the family Lycosidae. It is endemic to South Africa and is commonly known as the Kamieskroon Pterartoria wolf spider.

== Distribution ==
Pterartoria confusa is found in South Africa. It is presently known from the Northern Cape and Western Cape provinces. The species occurs at altitudes ranging from 134 to 1,530 m and is abundant in the Cederberg Wilderness Area.

== Habitat and ecology ==
Pterartoria confusa is a ground dwelling spider sampled from fynbos vegetation, with a single specimen collected in a vineyard.

== Conservation ==
Pterartoria confusa is listed as Least Concern by the South African National Biodiversity Institute due to its wide geographic range. There are no known threats to the species and it is protected in the Cederberg Wilderness Area and Anysberg Nature Reserve.

== Taxonomy ==
Pterartoria confusa was described by Russell-Smith and Roberts in 2017 from Kamieskroon, with the original description published on page 264 of their revision of the genus, accompanied by figures 13–16 and 27–28. Both the male and female were described at the time of the original description. No synonyms have been placed under this species since its description.
