= Pterartoria cederbergensis =

Cederberg Pterartoria wolf spider

Scientific classification
- Kingdom: Animalia
- Phylum: Arthropoda
- Subphylum: Chelicerata
- Class: Arachnida
- Order: Araneae
- Infraorder: Araneomorphae
- Family: Lycosidae
- Genus: Pterartoria
- Species: P. cederbergensis

Binomial name
- Pterartoria cederbergensis Russell-Smith & Roberts, 2017

Species of spider

Pterartoria cederbergensis is a species of spider in the family Lycosidae. It is endemic to South Africa and is commonly known as the Cederberg Pterartoria wolf spider.

== Distribution ==
Pterartoria cederbergensis is found in South Africa. It is endemic to the Western Cape province and presently known only from the Cederberg Wilderness Area. The species occurs at altitudes ranging from 243 to 1,282 m. Specific localities include Crystal Pools and Aan Het Berg.

== Habitat and ecology ==
Pterartoria cederbergensis was sampled with pitfall traps from the Fynbos biome.

== Conservation ==
Pterartoria cederbergensis is listed as Critically Rare by the South African National Biodiversity Institute. The species is apparently endemic to the Cederberg mountain range but rare, as sampling in the Cederberg Wilderness Area took place over a ten-year period and only two specimens were sampled. Due to its small restricted distribution range, it is listed as Critically Rare. It is presently protected in the Cederberg Wilderness Area.

== Taxonomy ==
Pterartoria cederbergensis was described by Russell-Smith and Roberts in 2017 from the Cederberg Wilderness Area. The species is known from both sexes.
