= Pterartoria subcrucifera =

Table Mountain Pterartoria wolf spider

Scientific classification
- Kingdom: Animalia
- Phylum: Arthropoda
- Subphylum: Chelicerata
- Class: Arachnida
- Order: Araneae
- Infraorder: Araneomorphae
- Family: Lycosidae
- Genus: Pterartoria
- Species: P. subcrucifera

Binomial name
- Pterartoria subcrucifera Purcell, 1903

Synonyms
- Pterartoriola subcrucifera Roewer, 1955

Species of spider

Pterartoria subcrucifera is a species of spider in the family Lycosidae. It is endemic to South Africa and is commonly known as the Table Mountain Pterartoria wolf spider.

== Distribution ==
Pterartoria subcrucifera is found in South Africa. It is known from the Northern Cape and Western Cape provinces. The species occurs at altitudes ranging from 5 to 1,283 m. It is a common species in the Western Cape.

== Habitat and ecology ==
Pterartoria subcrucifera is a free-running ground dwelling spider recorded from the Fynbos and Succulent Karoo biomes.

== Conservation ==
Pterartoria subcrucifera is listed as Least Concern by the South African National Biodiversity Institute due to its wide range. There are no significant threats to the species and it is protected at Table Mountain National Park, Cederberg Wilderness Area, and Anysberg Nature Reserve.

== Taxonomy ==
Pterartoria subcrucifera was described by Purcell in 1903 from Table Mountain National Park at Signal Hill. The species was transferred to Pterartoriola by Roewer in 1955 and back to Pterartoria by Russell-Smith and Roberts in 2017. It is known from both sexes.
