= Pterartoria sagae =

Cape Pterartoria wolf spider

Scientific classification
- Kingdom: Animalia
- Phylum: Arthropoda
- Subphylum: Chelicerata
- Class: Arachnida
- Order: Araneae
- Infraorder: Araneomorphae
- Family: Lycosidae
- Genus: Pterartoria
- Species: P. sagae

Binomial name
- Pterartoria sagae Purcell, 1903

Synonyms
- Pterartoriola sagae Roewer, 1955

Species of spider

Pterartoria sagae is a species of spider in the family Lycosidae. It is endemic to South Africa and is commonly known as the Cape Pterartoria wolf spider.

== Distribution ==
Pterartoria sagae is found in South Africa. It is endemic to the Western Cape province and known only from the type locality Hex River Valley near Worcester. The species occurs at an altitude of 242 m.

== Habitat and ecology ==
Pterartoria sagae is a free-running ground dwelling spider sampled from the Fynbos biome.

== Conservation ==
Pterartoria sagae is listed as Data Deficient for Taxonomic purposes by the South African National Biodiversity Institute. Threats to the species are unknown and additional sampling is needed to collect males and determine the species' range.

== Taxonomy ==
Pterartoria sagae was described by Purcell in 1903 from the Hex River Valley. The species was transferred to Pterartoriola by Roewer in 1955 and back to Pterartoria by Russell-Smith and Roberts in 2017. It is known only from females.
