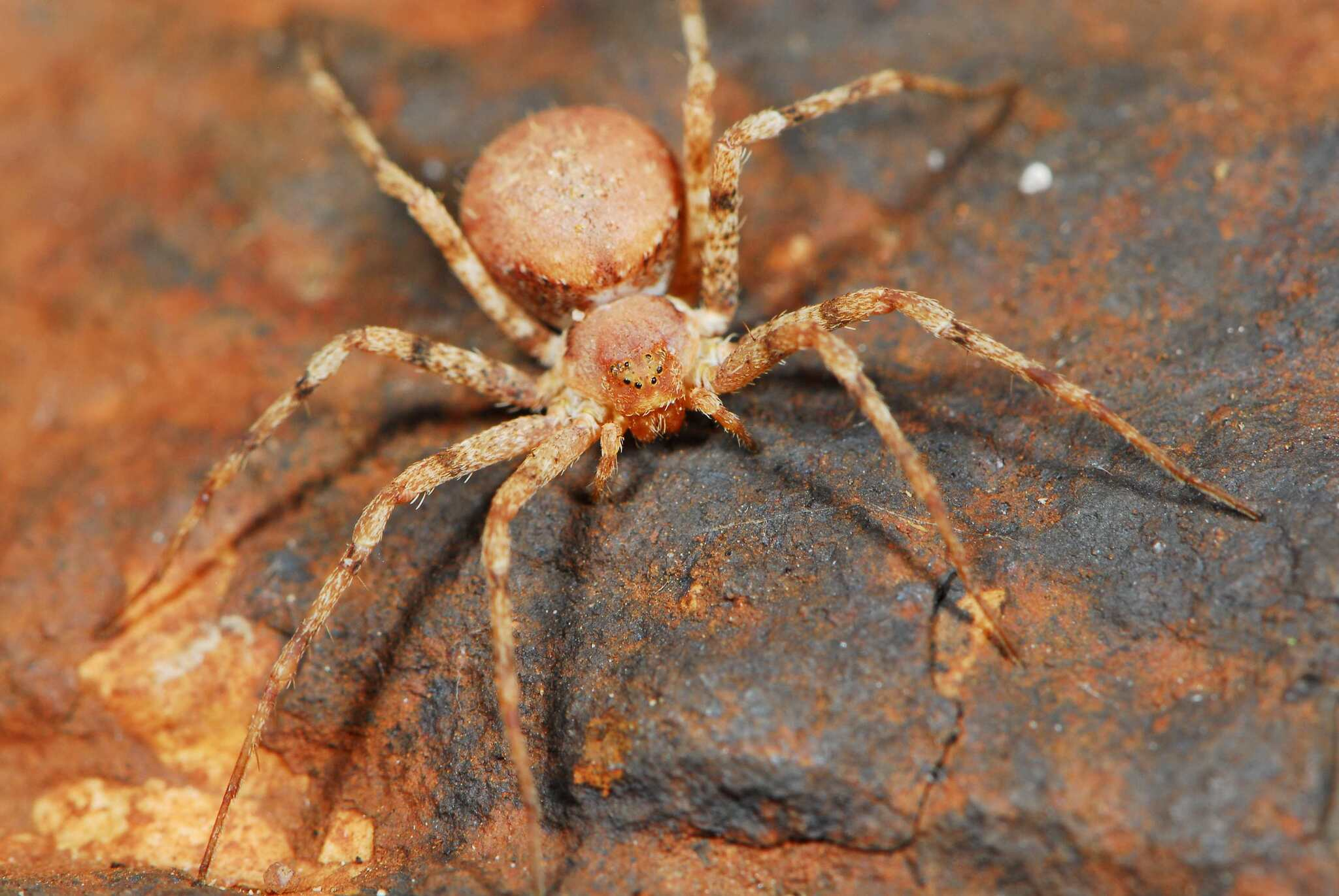
- Female from South Africa
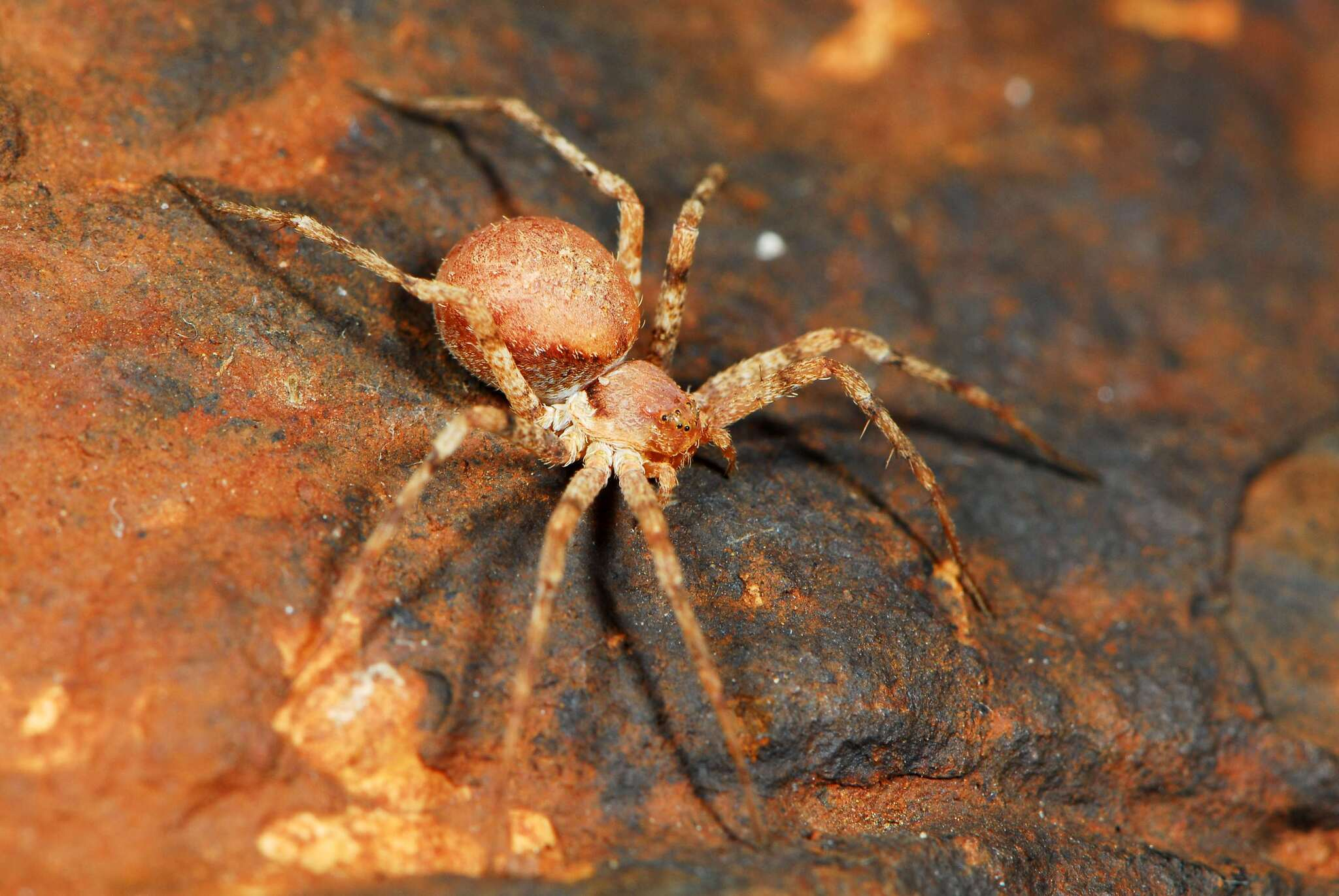

Scientific classification
- Kingdom: Animalia
- Phylum: Arthropoda
- Subphylum: Chelicerata
- Class: Arachnida
- Order: Araneae
- Infraorder: Araneomorphae
- Family: Philodromidae
- Genus: Hirriusa
- Species: H. bidentata

Binomial name
- Hirriusa bidentata (Lawrence, 1927)

= Hirriusa bidentata =

Northern Cape Ground Running Spider

Species of spider

Hirriusa bidentata is a species of spider in the family Philodromidae. It is commonly known as the Northern Cape ground running spider.

== Distribution ==
Hirriusa bidentata is known from Namibia and South Africa. In South Africa, it is recorded from four provinces including two protected areas, with an altitudinal range of 78-1587 m above sea level.

== Habitat and ecology ==
The species are free-living ground dwellers. They were sampled from pitfall traps and are frequently associated with termites. The species has been sampled from the Grassland, Fynbos, Nama Karoo and Savanna biomes.

== Conservation ==
Hirriusa bidentata is listed as Least Concern by the South African National Biodiversity Institute due to its wide range. The species is protected in the Gamkaberg Nature Reserve and in several localities in the Cederberg Wilderness Area.

== Etymology ==
The specific name means "two-toothed" in Latin.

== Taxonomy ==
The species was originally described by Lawrence (1927) as Hirrius bidentatus from Namibia. The genus has not been revised and the species is known from both sexes.
