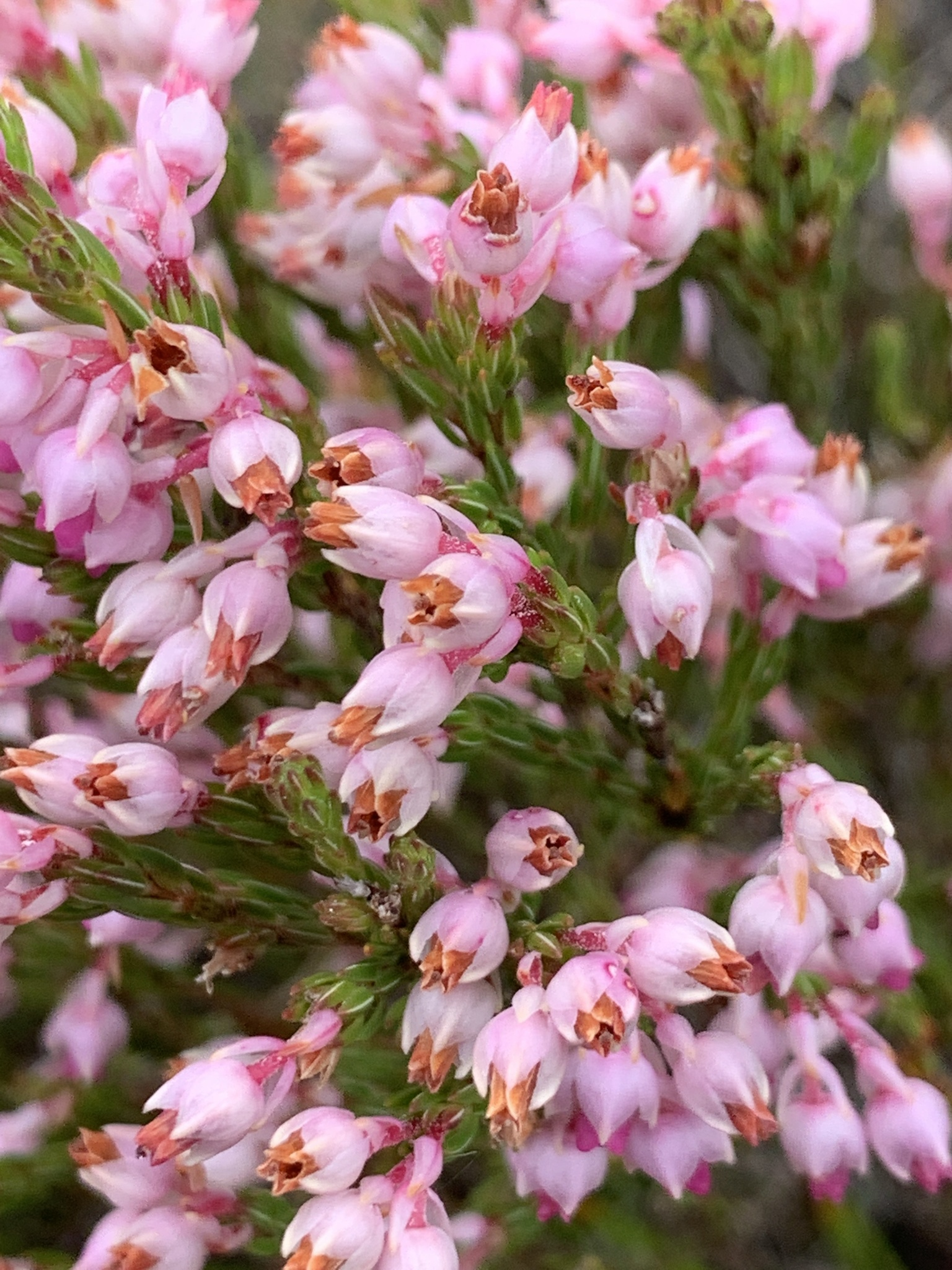

Scientific classification
- Kingdom: Plantae
- Clade: Tracheophytes
- Clade: Angiosperms
- Clade: Eudicots
- Clade: Asterids
- Order: Ericales
- Family: Ericaceae
- Genus: Erica
- Species: E. palliiflora

Binomial name
- Erica palliiflora Salisb.

Synonyms
- Erica pallida J.C.Wendl.; Ericoides palliiflorum (Salisb.) Kuntze; Eurylepis palliflora G.Don; Lamprotis pallida G.Don

= Erica palliiflora =

Species of flowering plant

Erica palliiflora is a plant belonging to the genus Erica and is part of the fynbos. The species is endemic to the Western Cape. It occurs in the mountains, from the Cederberg to the Cape Peninsula and down to George.
