= Disa cedarbergensis =

Scientific classification
- Kingdom: Plantae
- Clade: Tracheophytes
- Clade: Angiosperms
- Clade: Monocots
- Order: Asparagales
- Family: Orchidaceae
- Subfamily: Orchidoideae
- Genus: Disa
- Species: D. cedarbergensis

Binomial name
- Disa cedarbergensis H.P.Linder, (1988)

Species of flowering plant

Disa cedarbergensis, commonly known as the Cedarberg disa, is a perennial plant and geophyte belonging to the genus Disa and is part of the fynbos. The plant is endemic to the Western Cape and occurs in the Cederberg.

A single plant was found on Sneeukop in the Cederberg in 1987, two years after a wildfire. It was initially thought that the plant only flowers after its habitat has burned and that more plants would be found after further fires, but this did not happen. The plant has not been seen again since and is considered a natural rarity.
