= Pterartoria polysticta =

Bredasdorp Pterartoria wolf spider

Scientific classification
- Kingdom: Animalia
- Phylum: Arthropoda
- Subphylum: Chelicerata
- Class: Arachnida
- Order: Araneae
- Infraorder: Araneomorphae
- Family: Lycosidae
- Genus: Pterartoria
- Species: P. polysticta

Binomial name
- Pterartoria polysticta Purcell, 1903

Species of spider

Pterartoria polysticta is a species of spider in the family Lycosidae. It is endemic to South Africa and is commonly known as the Bredasdorp Pterartoria wolf spider.

== Distribution ==
Pterartoria polysticta is found in South Africa. It is endemic to the Western Cape province and occurs at an altitude of 80 m. Localities include Bredasdorp at Marcus Bay and Hermanus.

== Habitat and ecology ==
Pterartoria polysticta is a free-running ground dwelling spider sampled from the Fynbos biome in coastal habitats.

== Conservation ==
Pterartoria polysticta is listed as Data Deficient by the South African National Biodiversity Institute. Threats to the species are unknown and additional sampling is needed to determine the species' range.

== Taxonomy ==
Pterartoria polysticta was described by Purcell in 1903 from Bredasdorp. Russell-Smith and Roberts described the male in 2017. The species is known from both sexes.
