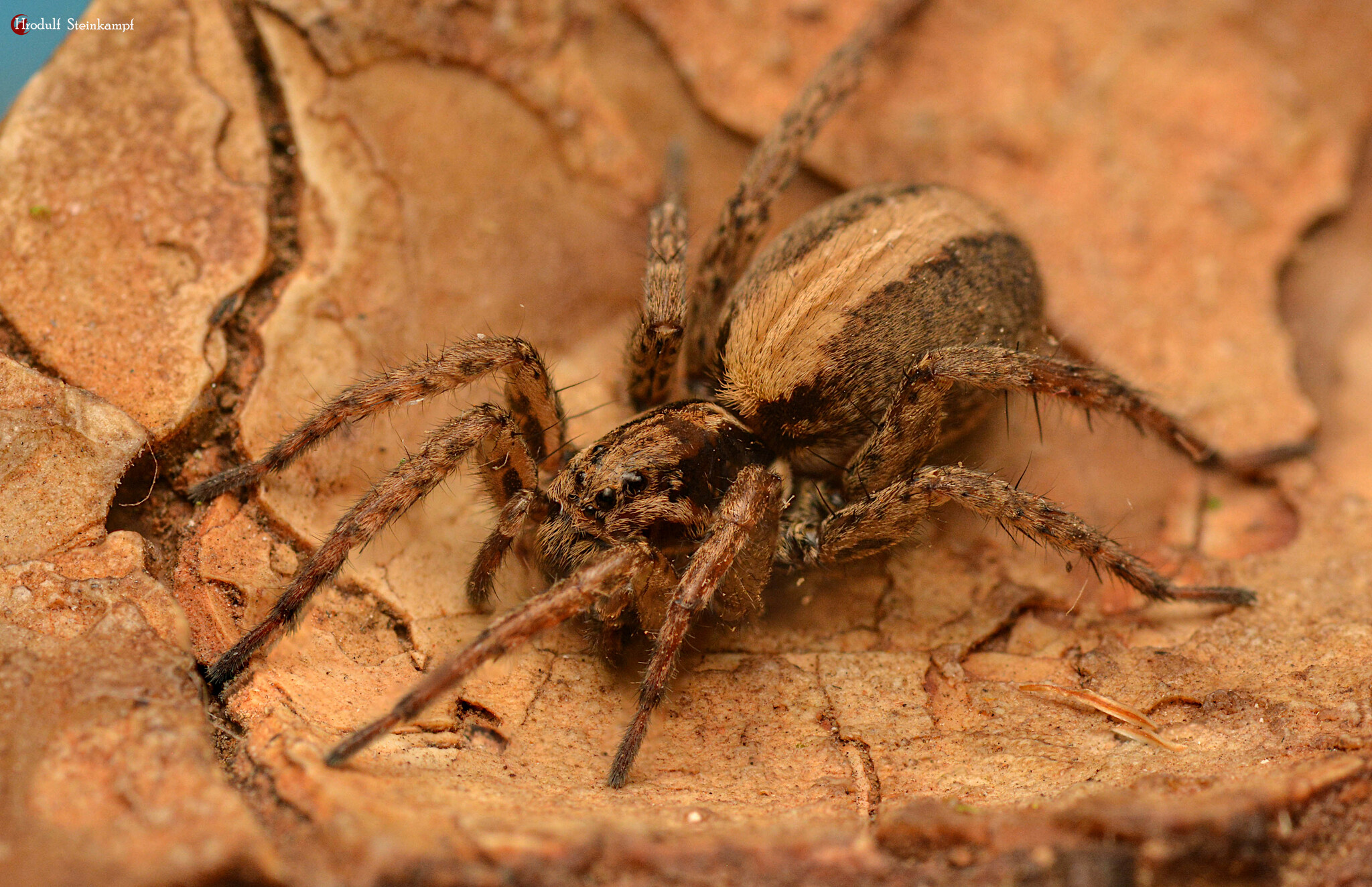
- female P. lativittata
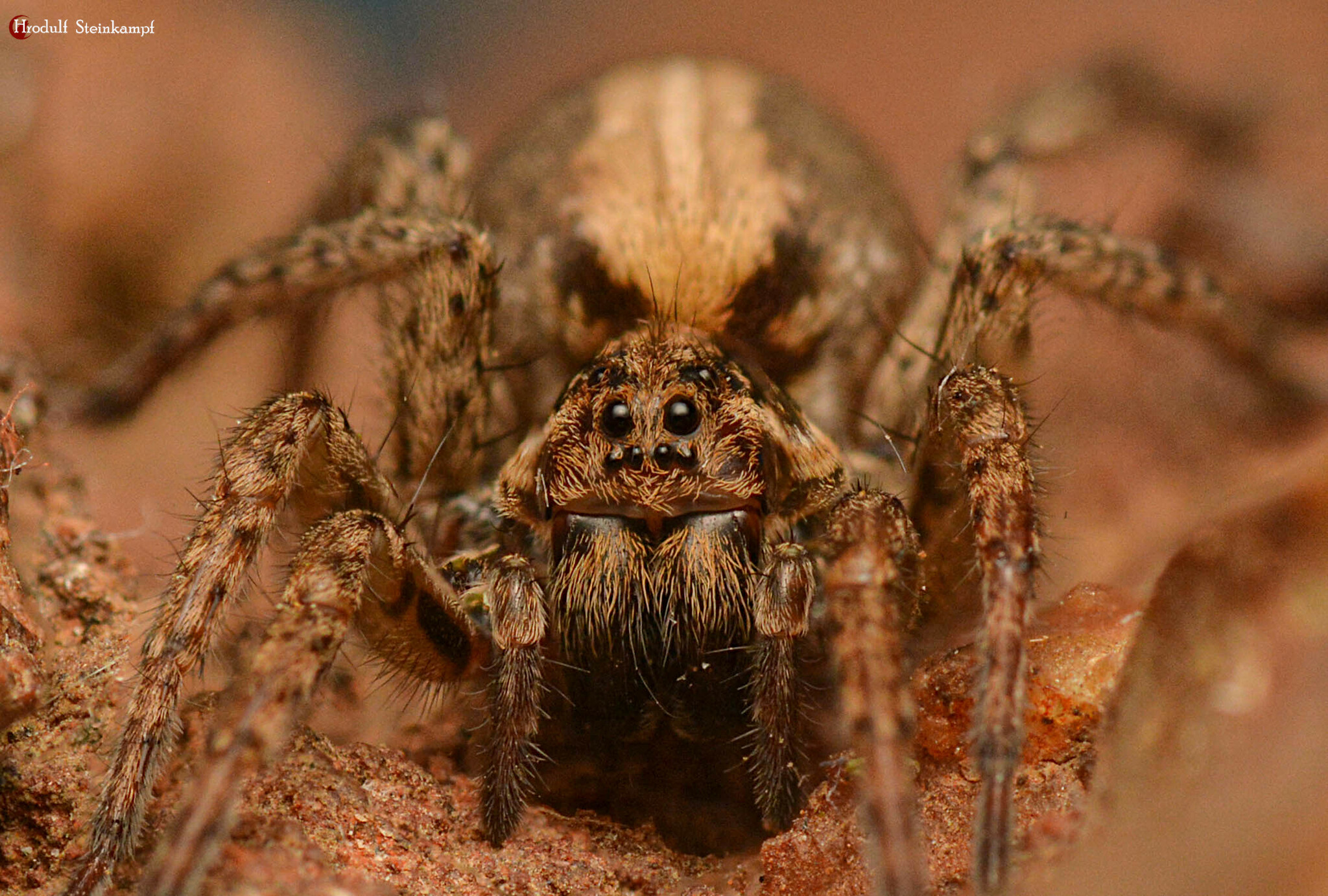
- P. lativittata

Scientific classification
- Kingdom: Animalia
- Phylum: Arthropoda
- Subphylum: Chelicerata
- Class: Arachnida
- Order: Araneae
- Infraorder: Araneomorphae
- Family: Lycosidae
- Genus: Pterartoria; Purcell

Species
- 10, see text

= Pterartoria =

Genus of spiders

Pterartoria is a genus of southern African wolf spiders in the family Lycosidae with ten described species. It was first erected in 1903 by William Frederick Purcell.

== Lifestyle ==
Members of the genus are free-running ground dwellers.

== Description ==
Pterartoria species have a total length of 5.0–9.0 mm.

The cephalic region is usually raised. The carapace has a longitudinal pale median band on darker brown background and paler submarginal bands. It is clothed in translucent white, adpressed, plumose setae, often with erect black setae in the head region. Eyes in the anterior row are slightly or strongly procurved but more or less straight in some species. The eye region is either totally blackened or has black rings surrounding each eye.

Chelicerae are normally brown, with a longitudinal black stripe in some species. Most are clothed in long, erect black setae. The sternum is scutiform, brown or grey, with central paler band in some species and either marginal band or complete covering of erect black setae.

The abdomen has dark brown or grey background with more or less broad yellow or orange central longitudinal band. Within the anterior portion of the band there is a paler lanceolate area sometimes outlined in black. In some species the posterior half of the band has 3–4 narrow, transverse black stripes. The surface is covered in translucent white, adpressed, plumose setae and often with longer, erect black setae. The ventral surface is pale.

Tibia I has 2 or exceptionally 3 pairs of principal spines ventrally. The metatarsus has 2 pairs of principal spines and smaller distal spines. Spines are normally long, thin and tapering. Legs are clothed in translucent white, adpressed, plumose setae as well as longer erect setae. They are normally pale yellow or orange with grey rings and/or blotches on at least femora but in some species extending to all segments other than tarsi. Tarsi are pale.

== Taxonomy ==
The genus was revised by Russell-Smith and Roberts in 2017. Pterartoria is most closely related to Proevippa and Trabea. Pterartoria differs from Trabea in lacking greatly enlarged anterior median eyes and a square-fronted carapace. Males of Pterartoria differ from Proevippa in that the terminal apophysis of the male palp does not have a sharply reflexed tip. Females of Proevippa differ from those of Pterartoria because they lack a clearly defined central plate in the epigyne.

== Species ==
As of October 2025, this genus includes ten species:

- Pterartoria arbuscula (Purcell, 1903) – South Africa
- Pterartoria caldaria Purcell, 1903 – South Africa
- Pterartoria cederbergensis Russell-Smith & Roberts, 2017 – South Africa
- Pterartoria confusa Russell-Smith & Roberts, 2017 – South Africa
- Pterartoria fissivittata Purcell, 1903 – South Africa
- Pterartoria flavolimbata Purcell, 1903 – South Africa
- Pterartoria lativittata Purcell, 1903 – South Africa, Lesotho
- Pterartoria polysticta Purcell, 1903 – South Africa
- Pterartoria sagae Purcell, 1903 – South Africa
- Pterartoria subcrucifera Purcell, 1903 – South Africa (type species)
