= Stadsaal Caves =

Caves in Cederberg, South Africa

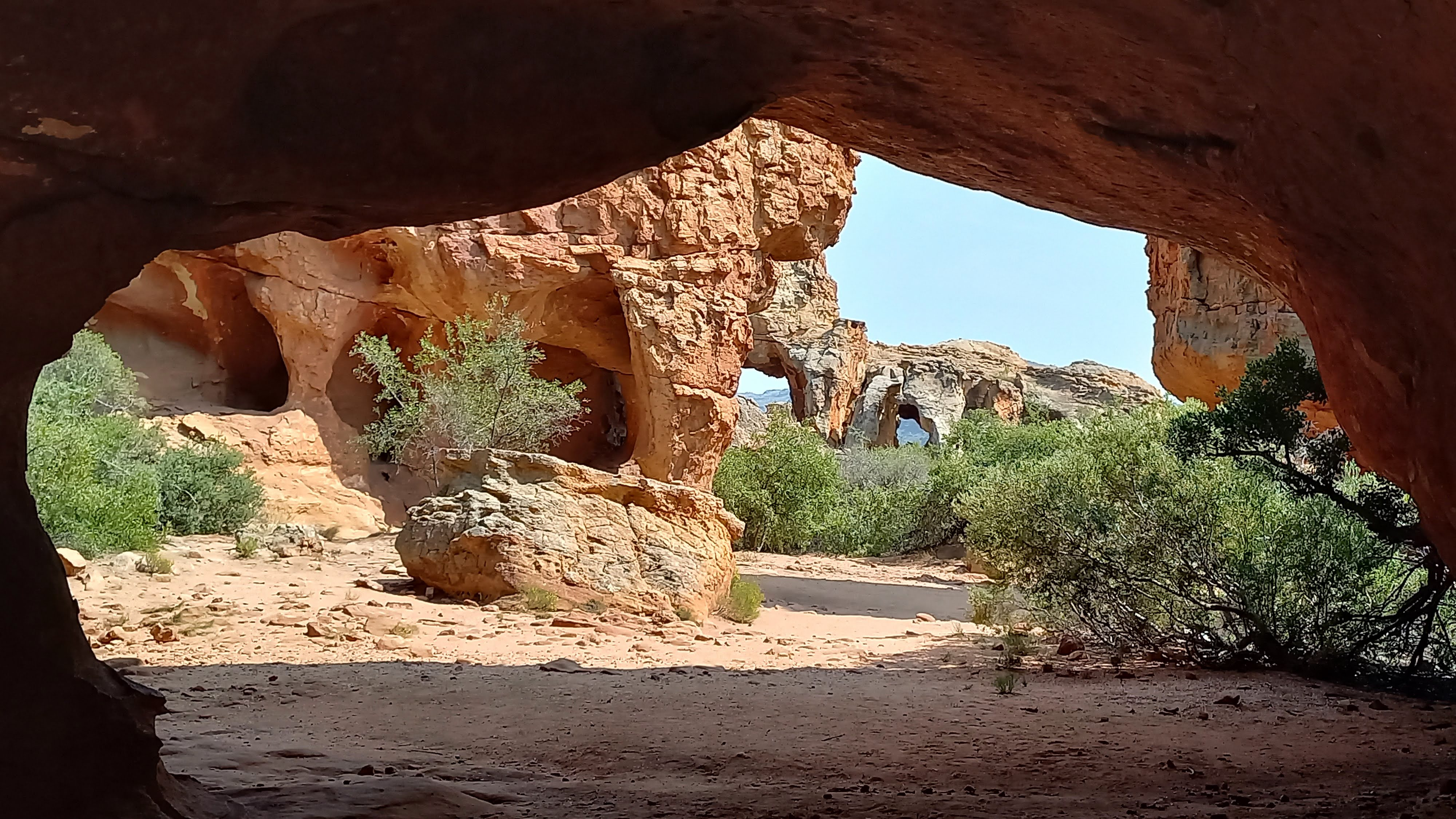
- Interactive map of Stadsaal Caves
- Location: Matjiesrivier Nature Reserve; Western Cape
- Coordinates: 32°31′22″S 19°19′3″E

The Stadsaal Caves (or Stadtsaal, meaning "town hall") are located in the Cederberg, South Africa. The area is notable for rock formations, caves and overhangs formed by erosion of lower layers of the sandstone, as well as prehistoric rock paintings. Stadsaal forms part of the Matjiesrivier Nature Reserve, which was purchased by WWF South Africa in 1995 and is administered by CapeNature.

== San rock art ==
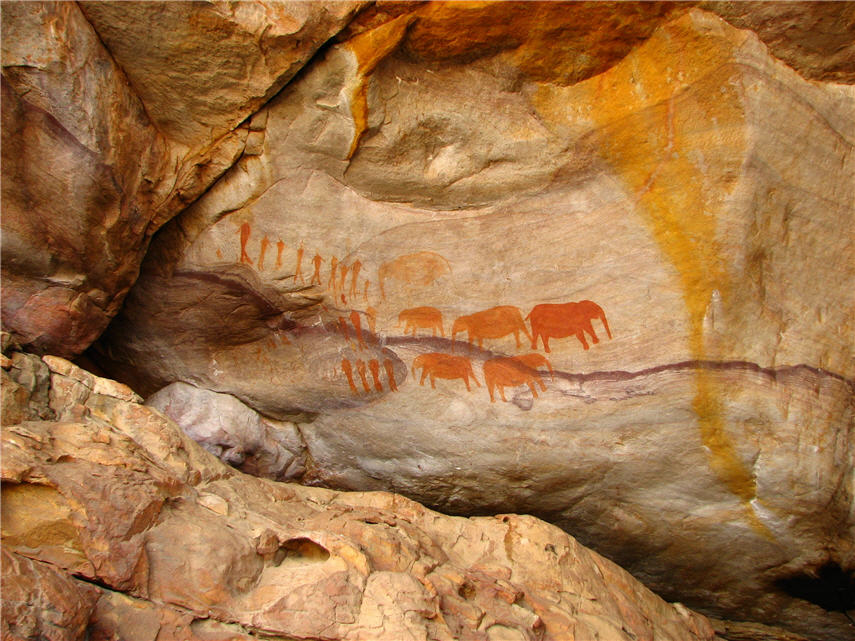
San rock paintings of human figures and elephants located in an overhang near the Stadsaal Caves

San rock art depicting human figures and elephants is located in an overhang near the Stadsaal Caves. Cederberg rock art is believed to range between 8000 years old and 100 to 200 years old.

== Modern history ==
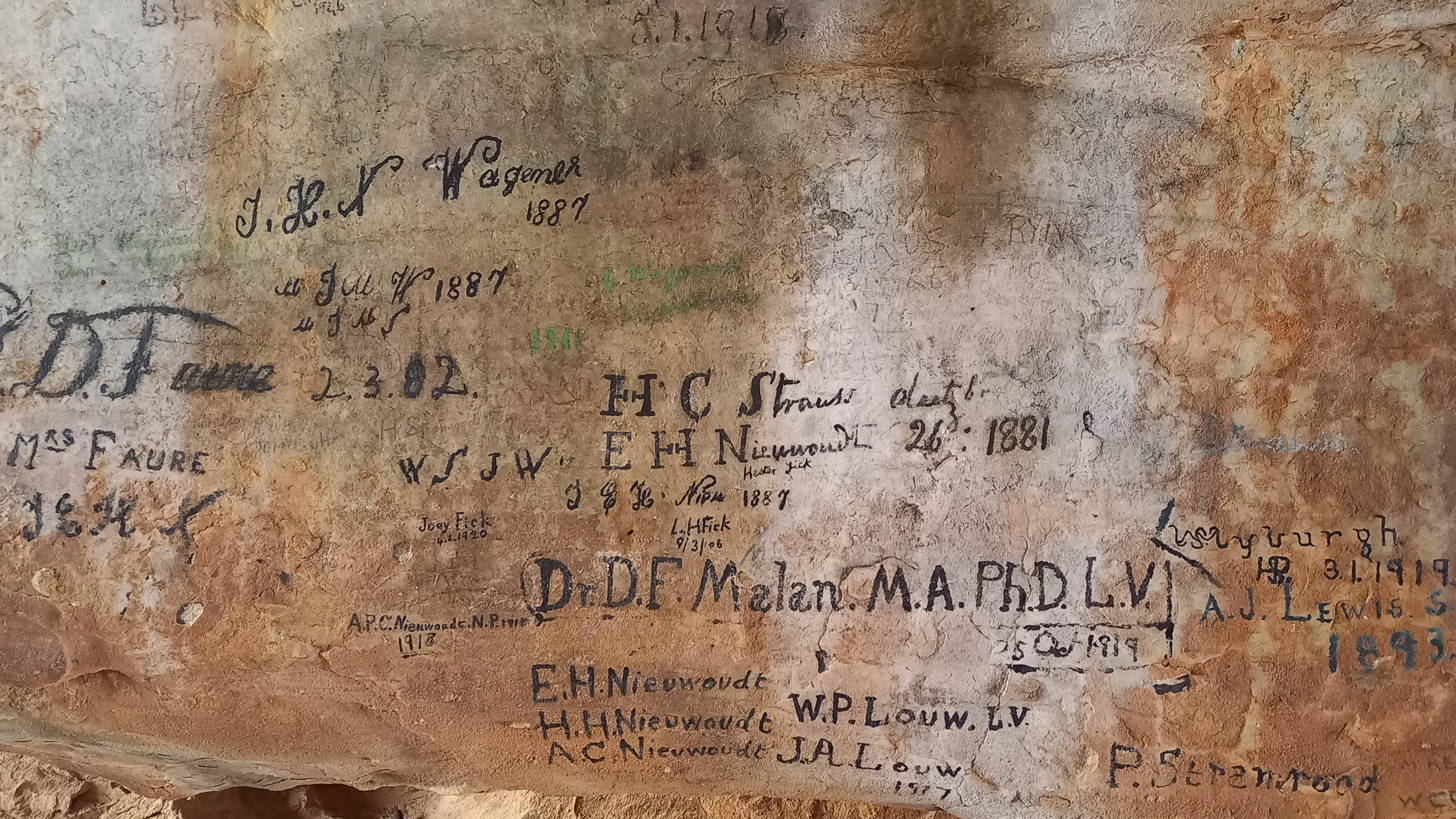
Names of modern visitors including D. F. Malan (later Prime Minister) and local land owners from the Wagener and Nieuwoudt families.

The caves also include modern graffiti, some dating back to the late 19th century, as visitors recorded their names and date of visit. Prominent names include D. F. Malan, later Prime Minister of South Africa, who visited the site in 1919 as Member of Parliament for the Calvinia constituency in which the Cederberg fell. Local farmers arranged annual gatherings at Stadsaal from 1918 to raise funds for Malan's National Party. Prime Minister P. W. Botha and cabinet minister Dawie de Villiers also visited Stadsaal in 1987 and their names, now vandalised, are also recorded on the rock.

== Tourism ==
The site is open to the public and both the main caves and the San rock paintings nearby are accessible via a gravel road. Permits to visit are available from CapeNature offices at Matjiesrivier or Algeria and from guest farms at Dwars River, Krom River and others in the Cederberg Conservancy.

== See also ==
- List of caves in South Africa
