= Pterartoria flavolimbata =

Banded-legged Pterartoria wolf spider

Scientific classification
- Kingdom: Animalia
- Phylum: Arthropoda
- Subphylum: Chelicerata
- Class: Arachnida
- Order: Araneae
- Infraorder: Araneomorphae
- Family: Lycosidae
- Genus: Pterartoria
- Species: P. flavolimbata

Binomial name
- Pterartoria flavolimbata Purcell, 1903

Species of spider

Pterartoria flavolimbata is a species of spider in the family Lycosidae. It is endemic to South Africa and is commonly known as the banded-legged Pterartoria wolf spider.

== Distribution ==
Pterartoria flavolimbata is found in South Africa. It is endemic to the Western Cape province and recorded only from sand dunes in the Cape Peninsula dunes to north of Muizenberg. The species occurs at altitudes ranging from 4 to 479 m. Half of the specimens were sampled prior to 1903.

== Habitat and ecology ==
Pterartoria flavolimbata is a free-running ground spider recorded only from sand dunes in the Fynbos biome in the Cape Peninsula dunes to north of Muizenberg.

== Conservation ==
Pterartoria flavolimbata is listed as Data Deficient by the South African National Biodiversity Institute. Threats to the species are unknown but additional sampling is needed to determine the species' range.

== Taxonomy ==
Pterartoria flavolimbata was described by Purcell in 1903 from Hout Bay. The species was revised by Russell-Smith and Roberts in 2017 and is known from both sexes.
