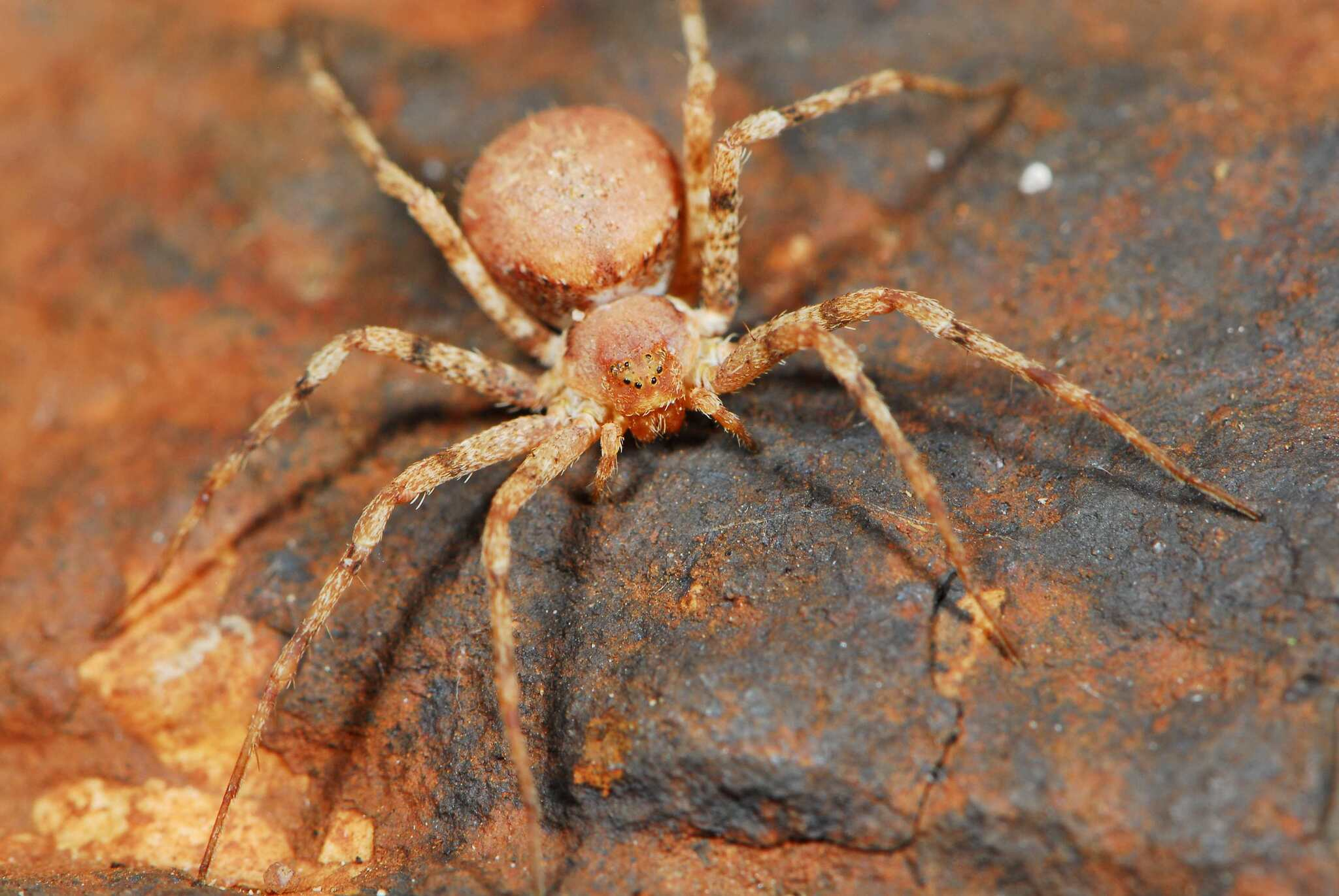
- Female H. bidentata from South Africa
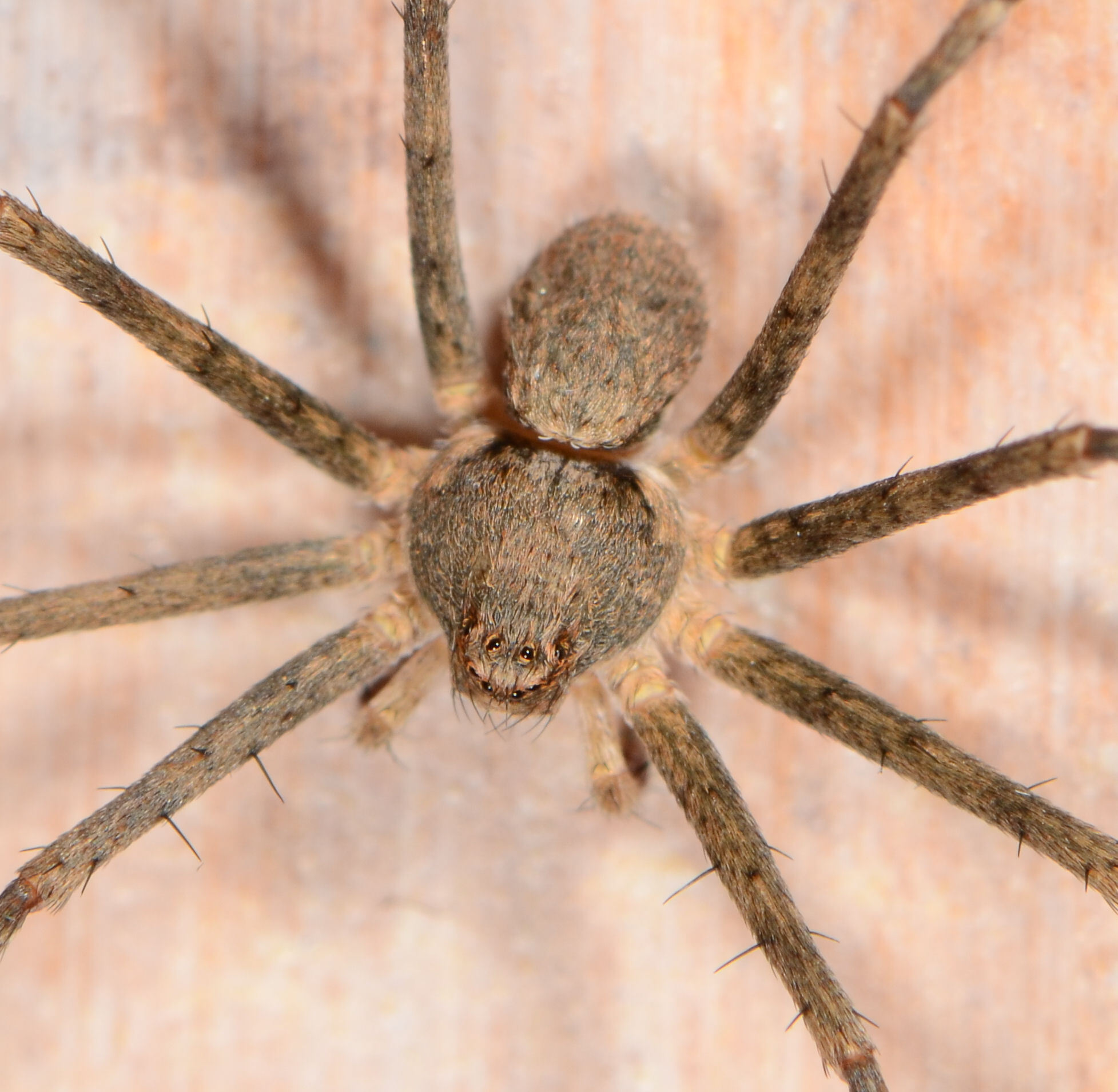
- Male H. arenacea

Scientific classification
- Kingdom: Animalia
- Phylum: Arthropoda
- Subphylum: Chelicerata
- Class: Arachnida
- Order: Araneae
- Infraorder: Araneomorphae
- Family: Philodromidae
- Genus: Hirriusa; Strand, 1932

Type species
- H. variegata (Simon, 1895)

Species
- Hirriusa arenacea H. arenacea; (Lawrence, 1927) Hirriusa bidentata; H. bidentata (Lawrence, 1927); H. variegata (Simon, 1895)

= Hirriusa =

Genus of spiders

Hirriusa is a genus of African running crab spiders that was first described by Embrik Strand in 1932. Its three species are endemic to southern Africa.

== Species ==
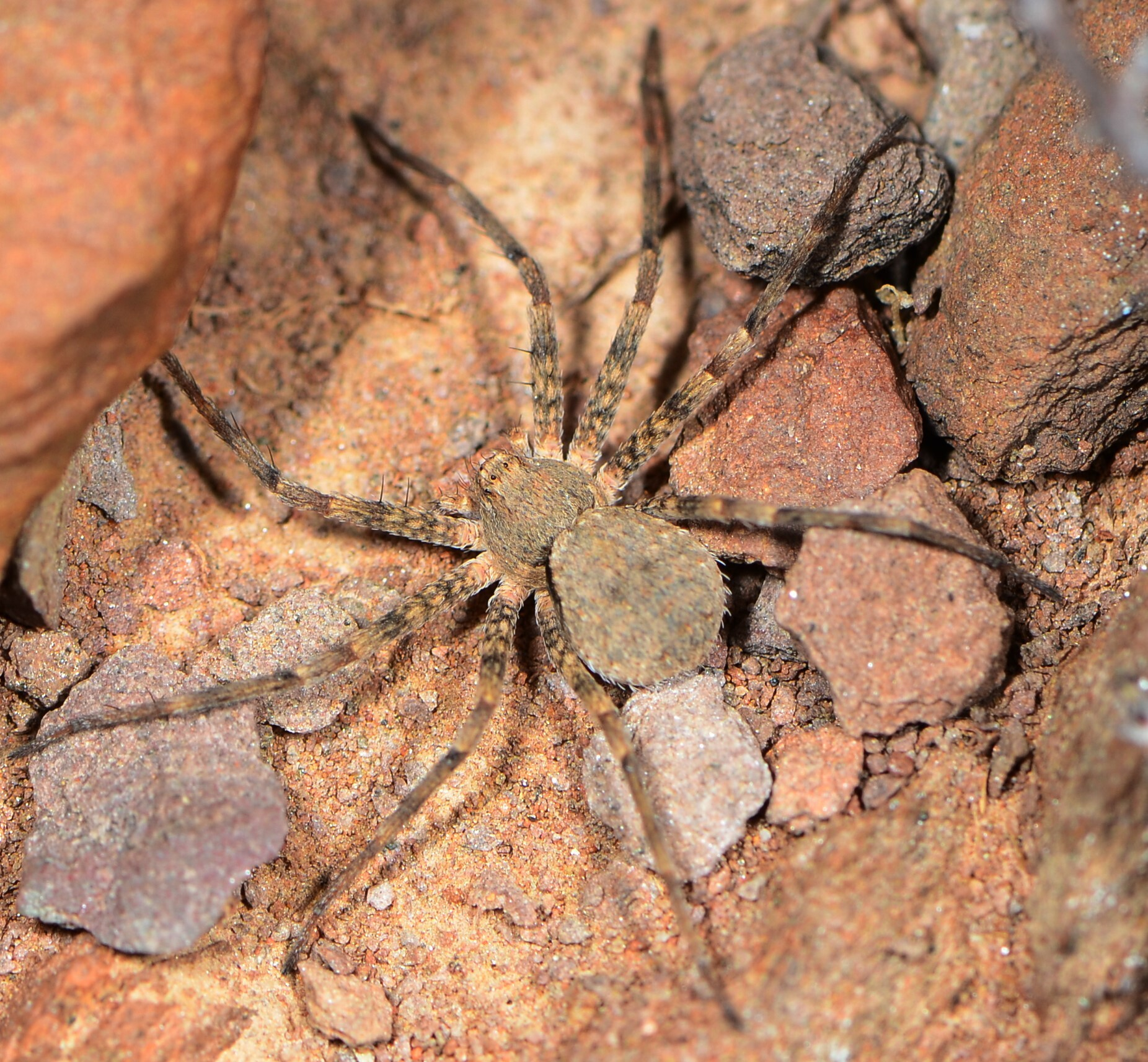
female H. arenacea

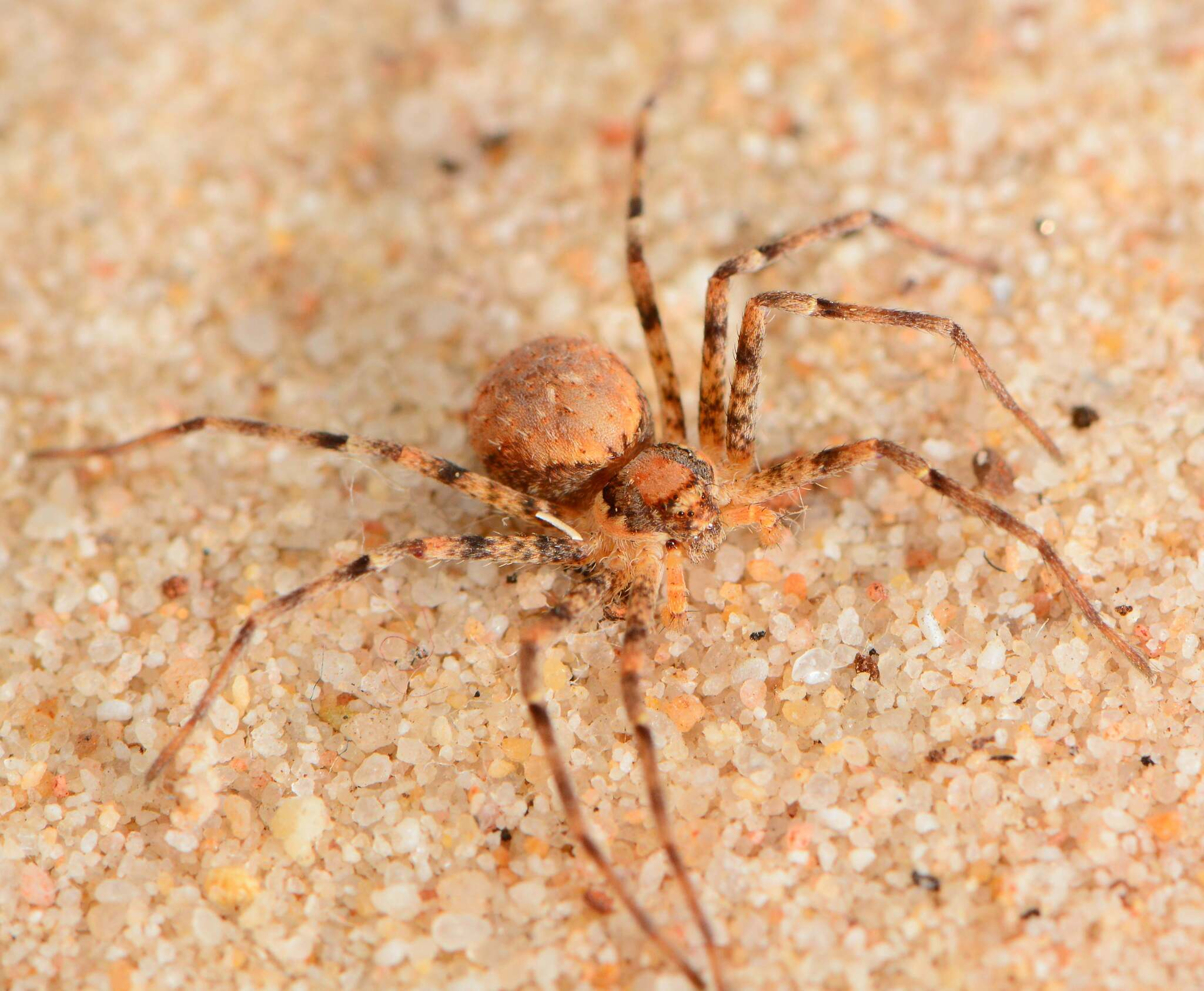
H. variegata

As of October 2025, this genus includes three species:

- Hirriusa arenacea (Lawrence, 1927) – Namibia, Botswana, South Africa
- Hirriusa bidentata (Lawrence, 1927) – Namibia, South Africa
- Hirriusa variegata (Simon, 1895) – South Africa (type species)
