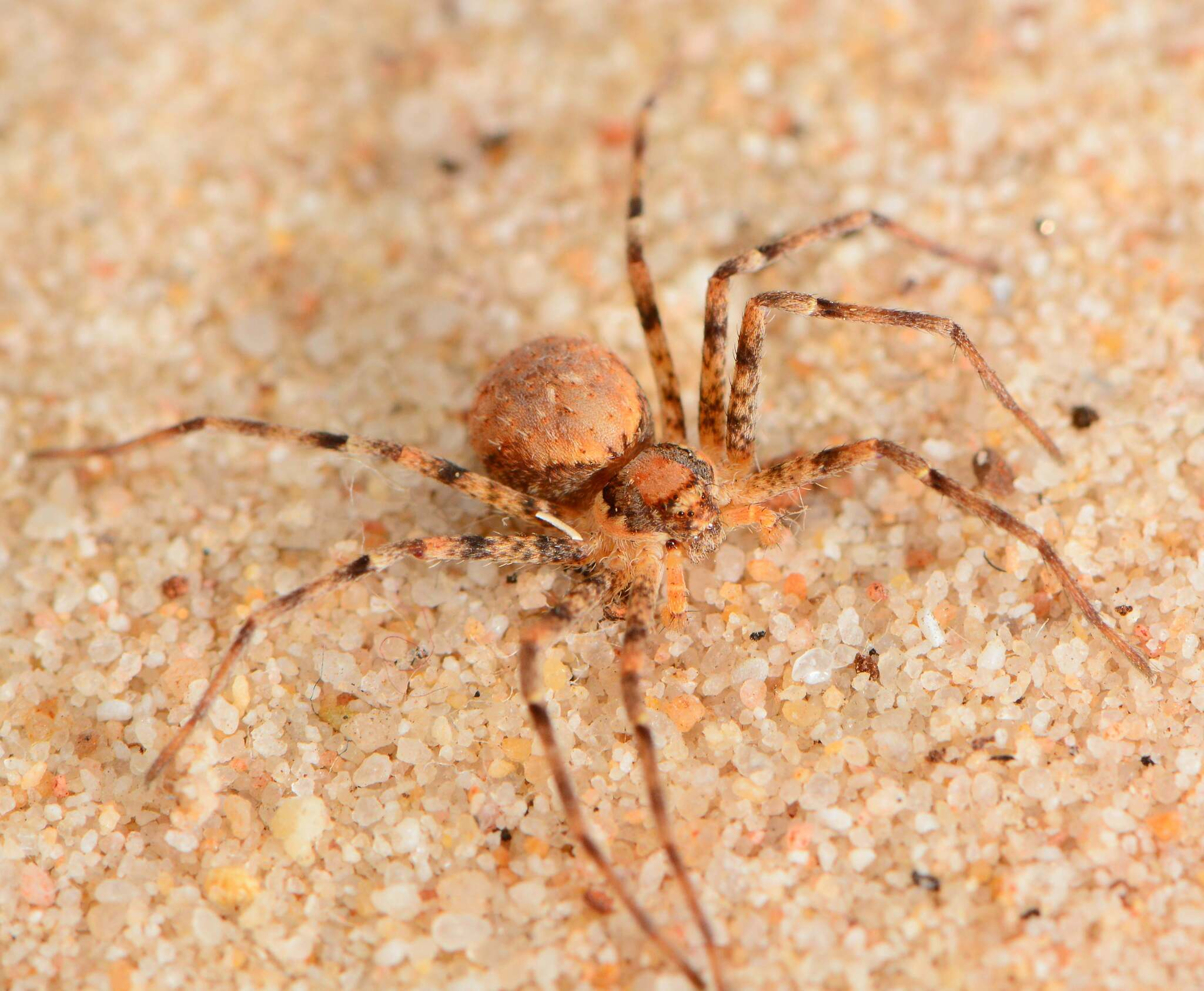
- female
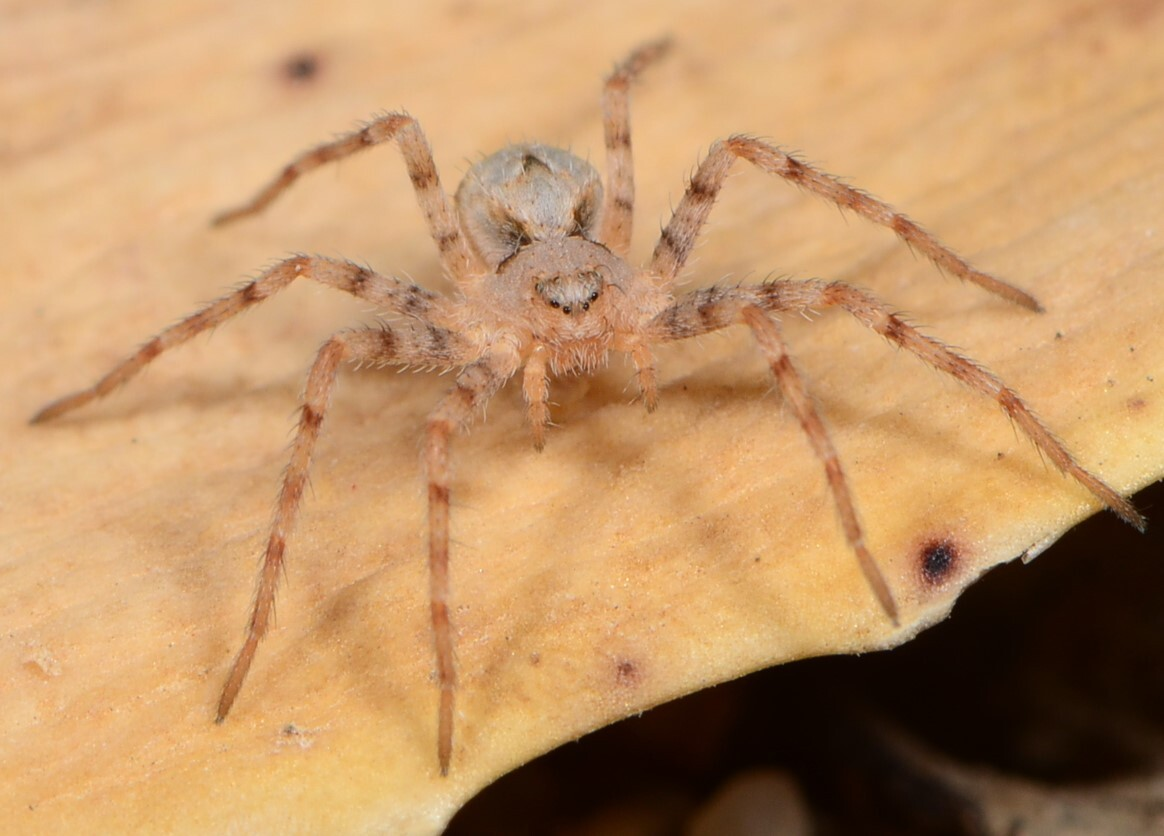
- female

Scientific classification
- Kingdom: Animalia
- Phylum: Arthropoda
- Subphylum: Chelicerata
- Class: Arachnida
- Order: Araneae
- Infraorder: Araneomorphae
- Family: Philodromidae
- Genus: Hirriusa
- Species: H. variegata

Binomial name
- Hirriusa variegata (Simon, 1895)

= Hirriusa variegata =

Banded Leg Ground Running Spider

Species of spider

Hirriusa variegata is a species of spider in the family Philodromidae. It is commonly known as the banded leg ground running spider and serves as the type species for the genus Hirriusa.

== Distribution ==
Hirriusa variegata is endemic to South Africa. The species has a wide distribution and has been recorded from five provinces including eight protected areas, with an altitudinal range of 172-1828 m above sea level.

== Habitat and ecology ==
The species is a free-running ground dweller frequently sampled from pitfall traps. They have been associated with termites. The species has been sampled from the Grassland, Nama Karoo and Savanna biomes.

== Description ==
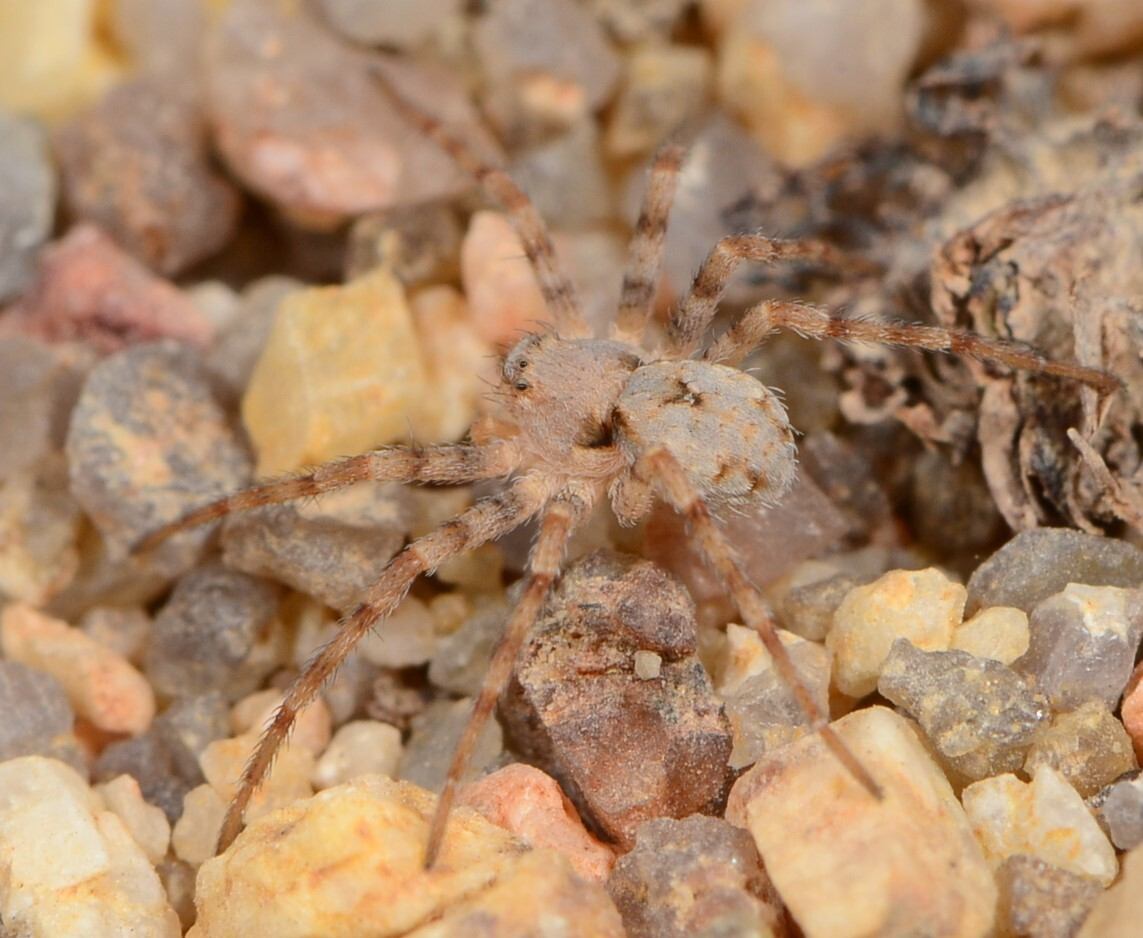
female

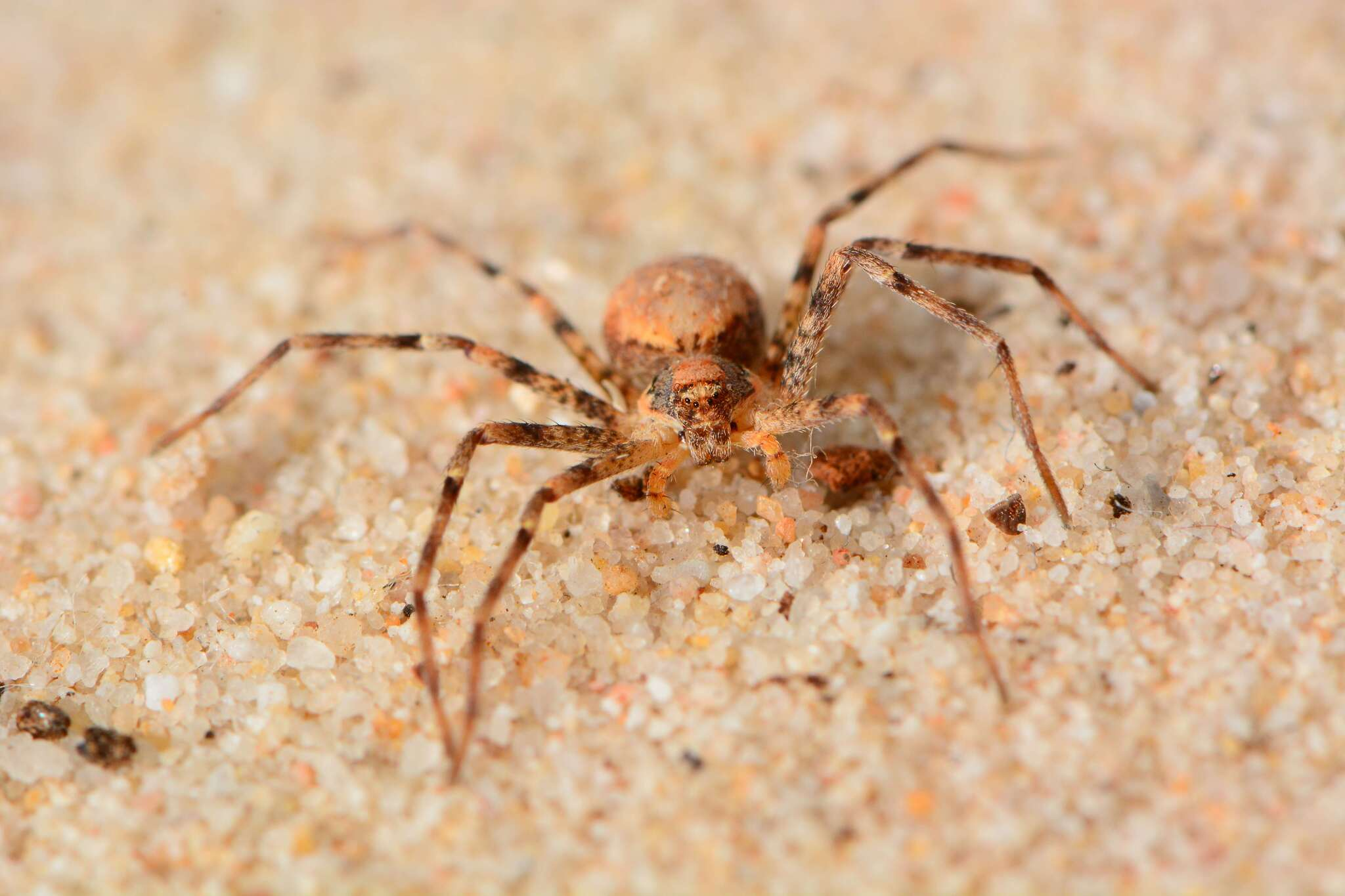
female

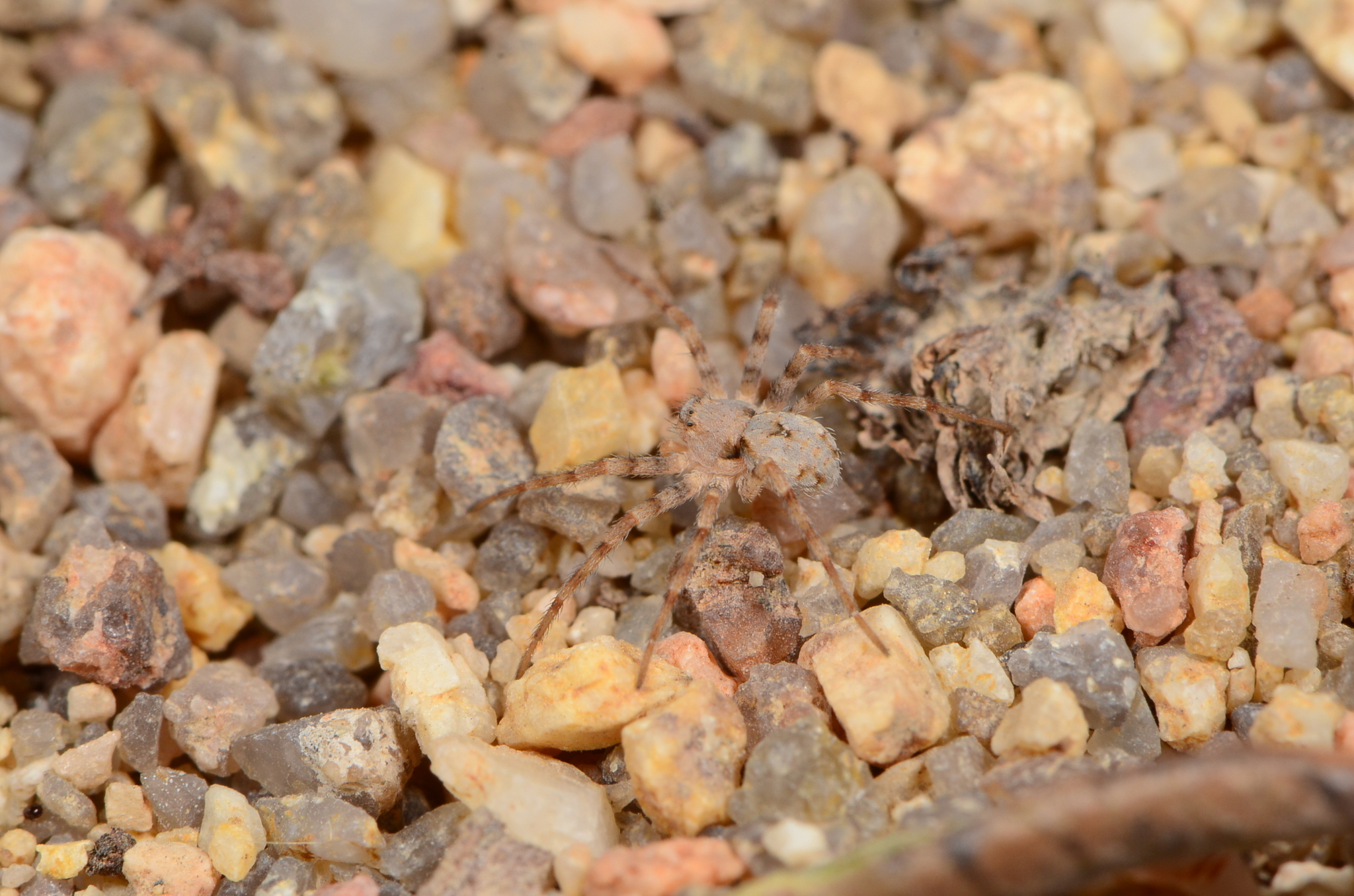
female

== Conservation ==
Hirriusa variegata is listed as Least Concern by the South African National Biodiversity Institute due to its wide range. The species is protected in eight protected areas including Blouberg Nature Reserve, Nylsvley Nature Reserve and Kruger National Park.

== Taxonomy ==
The species was originally described by Simon (1895) as Hirrius variegatus from the type locality listed as Transvaal. The genus has not been revised and the species is known only from the female.
