= Pterartoria arbuscula =

Hanover's Pterartoria wolf spider

Scientific classification
- Kingdom: Animalia
- Phylum: Arthropoda
- Subphylum: Chelicerata
- Class: Arachnida
- Order: Araneae
- Infraorder: Araneomorphae
- Family: Lycosidae
- Genus: Pterartoria
- Species: P. arbuscula

Binomial name
- Pterartoria arbuscula (Purcell, 1903)

Synonyms
- Lycosa arbuscula Purcell, 1903

Species of spider

Pterartoria arbuscula is a species of spider in the family Lycosidae. It is endemic to South Africa and is commonly known as Hanover's Pterartoria wolf spider.

== Distribution ==
Pterartoria arbuscula is found in South Africa. It is known from the provinces Eastern Cape, Mpumalanga, and Northern Cape. The species occurs at altitudes ranging from 565 to 1,415 m. Localities include Grahamstown, Lydenburg, and Hanover.

== Habitat and ecology ==
Pterartoria arbuscula is a free-running ground dwelling spider sampled from the Grassland biome.

== Conservation ==
Pterartoria arbuscula is listed as Least Concern by the South African National Biodiversity Institute due to its wide range. There are no known threats to the species, though additional sampling is needed to determine its full range.

== Taxonomy ==
Pterartoria arbuscula was originally described by Purcell in 1903 as Lycosa arbuscula from Hanover in the Northern Cape. The species was reviewed by Roewer in 1959 and revised by Russell-Smith and Roberts in 2017. It is known from both sexes.
