= Matjiesrivier Nature Reserve =

- Location within Western Cape
- Location: Western Cape, South Africa
- Coordinates: 32°31′0″S 19°23′02″E
- Area: 128 km^{2} (49 sq mi)
- Established: 1995
- Governing body: CapeNature
- World Heritage site: 2004 (Cape Floral Region Protected Areas)
- Website: www.capenature.co.za/reserves/matjiesrivier-nature-reserve

UNESCO World Heritage Site
- Part of: Cape Floral Region Protected Areas
- Criteria: Natural: ix, x
- Reference: 1007-002
- Inscription: 2004 (28th Session)
- Extensions: 2015

The Matjiesrivier Nature Reserve is a nature reserve located in the north of the Western Cape province, close to the Cederberg Nature Reserve which borders its northwestern limit. It is part of the Cape Floral Kingdom ecosystem and is one of the Cape Floral Region Protected Areas.

It was purchased in 1995 by WWF South Africa and has since been managed by CapeNature, the Western Cape Province's state conservation agency.

Its subsoil has a predominance of slate which favors the karoo (semi-desert type vegetation) on the fynbos.

There are remarkable quantities of cave paintings by the Khoi-San (or Khoi) bushmen, in such numbers that new discoveries are regularly made. These rock paintings, which range in age from 300 to 6,000 years, trace the social and spiritual history of late Stone Age mankind, and are protected as National Monuments under the 1999 National Heritage Resources Act.

== See also ==
- Stadsaal Caves

=== Related articles ===
- Cederberg Nature Reserve
