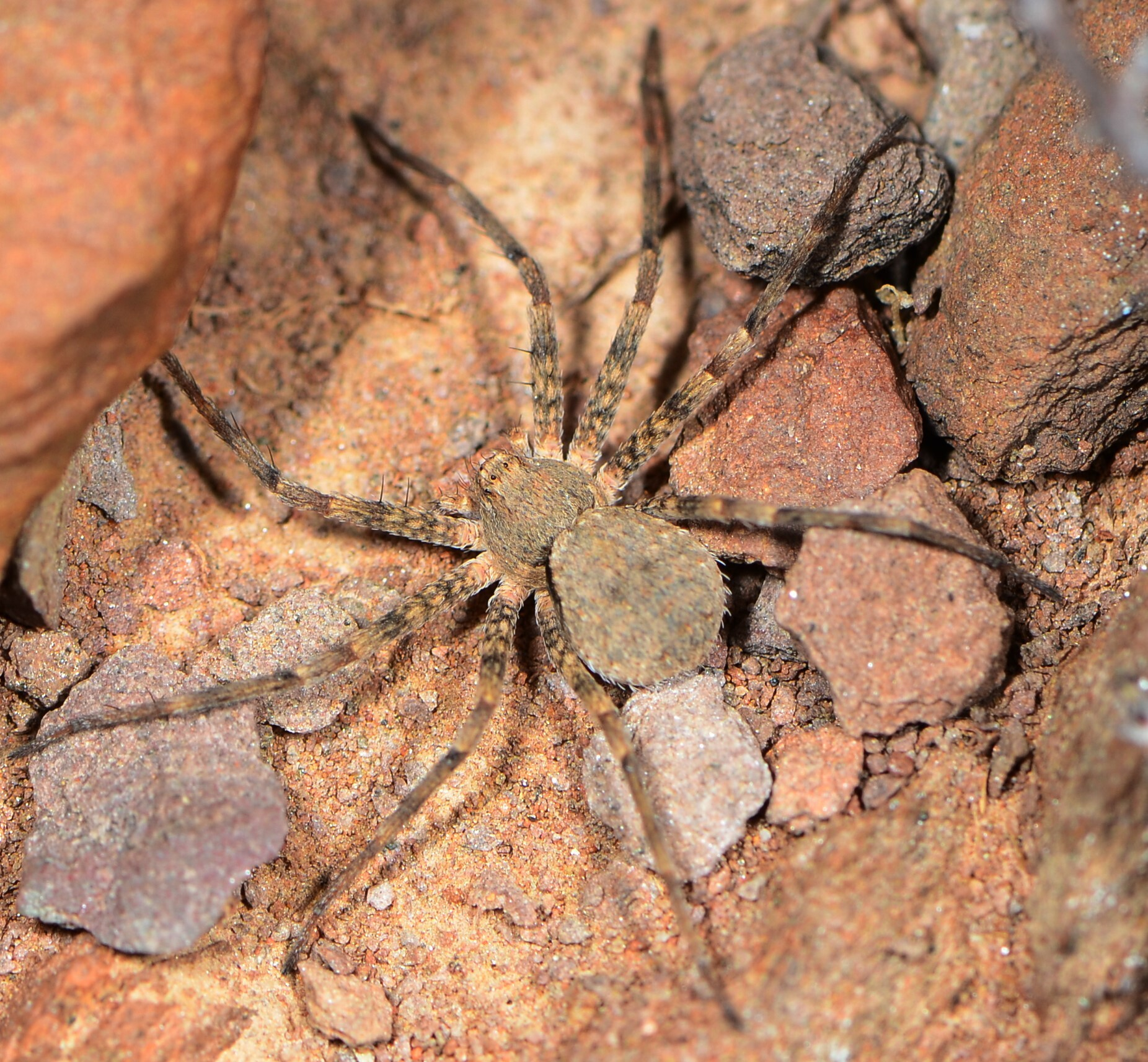
- female
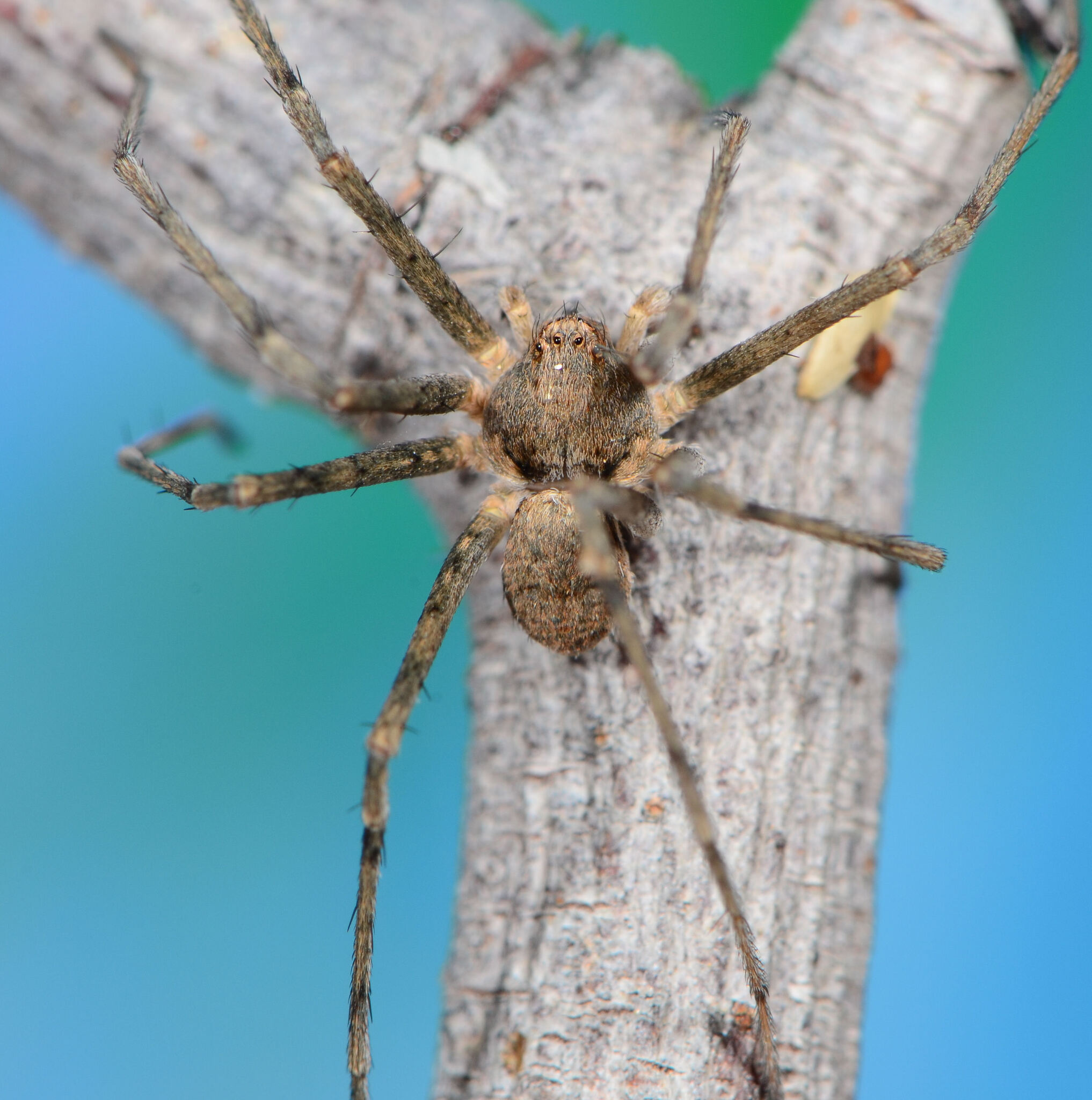
- male

Scientific classification
- Kingdom: Animalia
- Phylum: Arthropoda
- Subphylum: Chelicerata
- Class: Arachnida
- Order: Araneae
- Infraorder: Araneomorphae
- Family: Philodromidae
- Genus: Hirriusa
- Species: H. arenacea

Binomial name
- Hirriusa arenacea (Lawrence, 1927)

= Hirriusa arenacea =

Namibia Ground Running Spider

Species of spider

Hirriusa arenacea is a species of spider in the family Philodromidae. It is commonly known as the Namibia ground running spider.

== Distribution ==
Hirriusa arenacea is recorded from Namibia, Botswana, and South Africa. In South Africa, it is known from seven provinces including seven protected areas, with an altitudinal range of 377-1513 m above sea level.

== Habitat and ecology ==
The species is a free-living agile ground dweller readily collected in pitfall traps. With their cryptic colouration, they are well camouflaged and not easily seen on the soil surface. They are frequently encountered in areas infested with termites. The species has been sampled from the Grassland, Desert, Nama Karoo, Savanna, Succulent Karoo and Thicket biomes, and is also recorded from pistachio orchards.

== Description ==
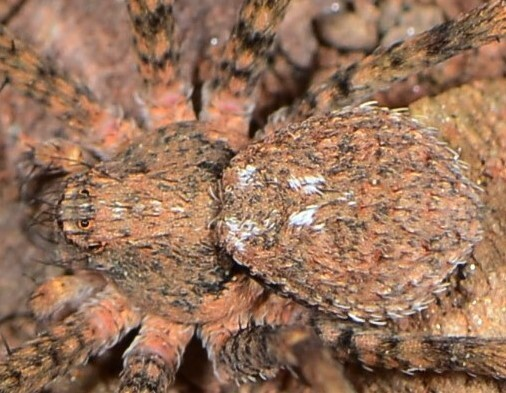
female

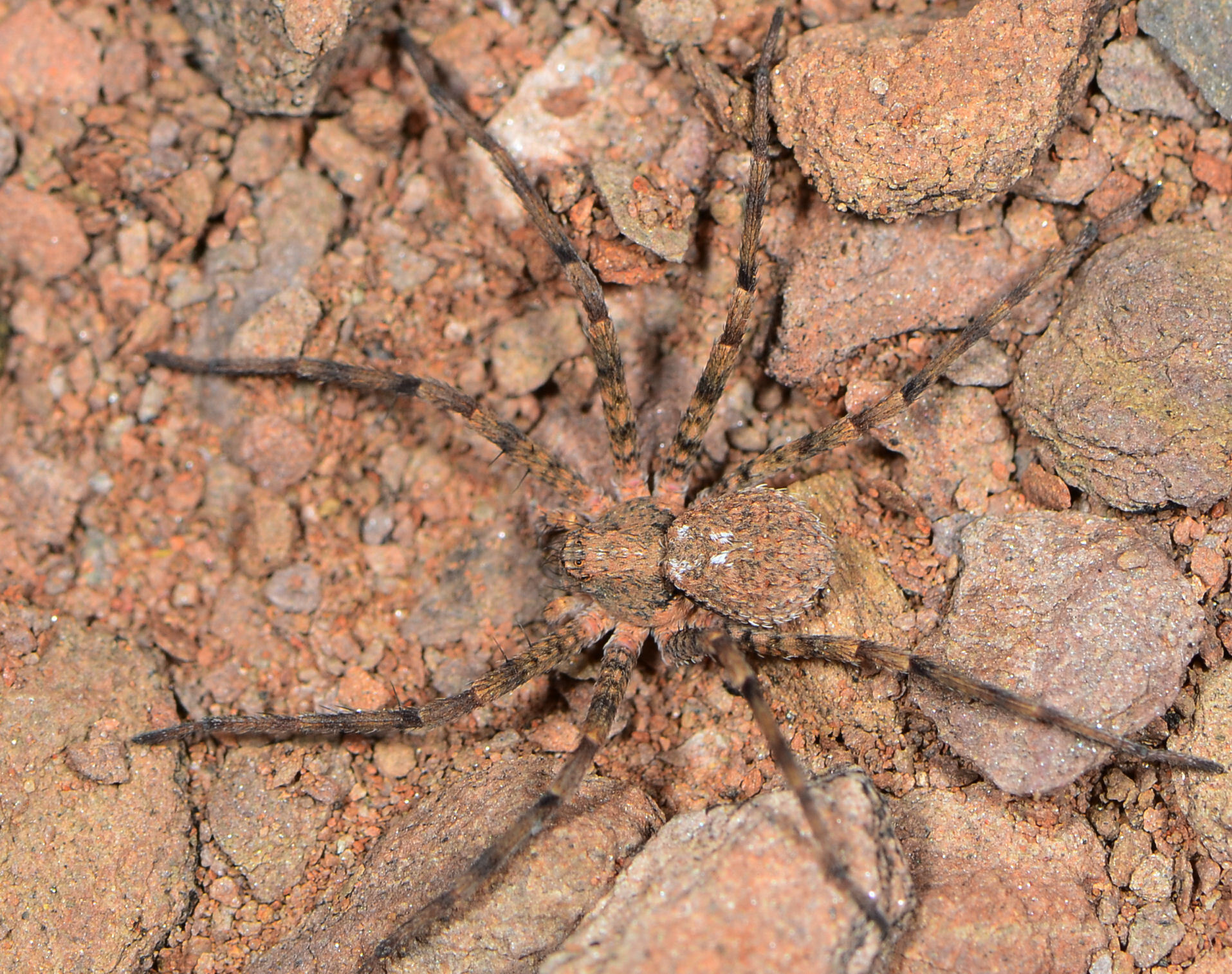
female

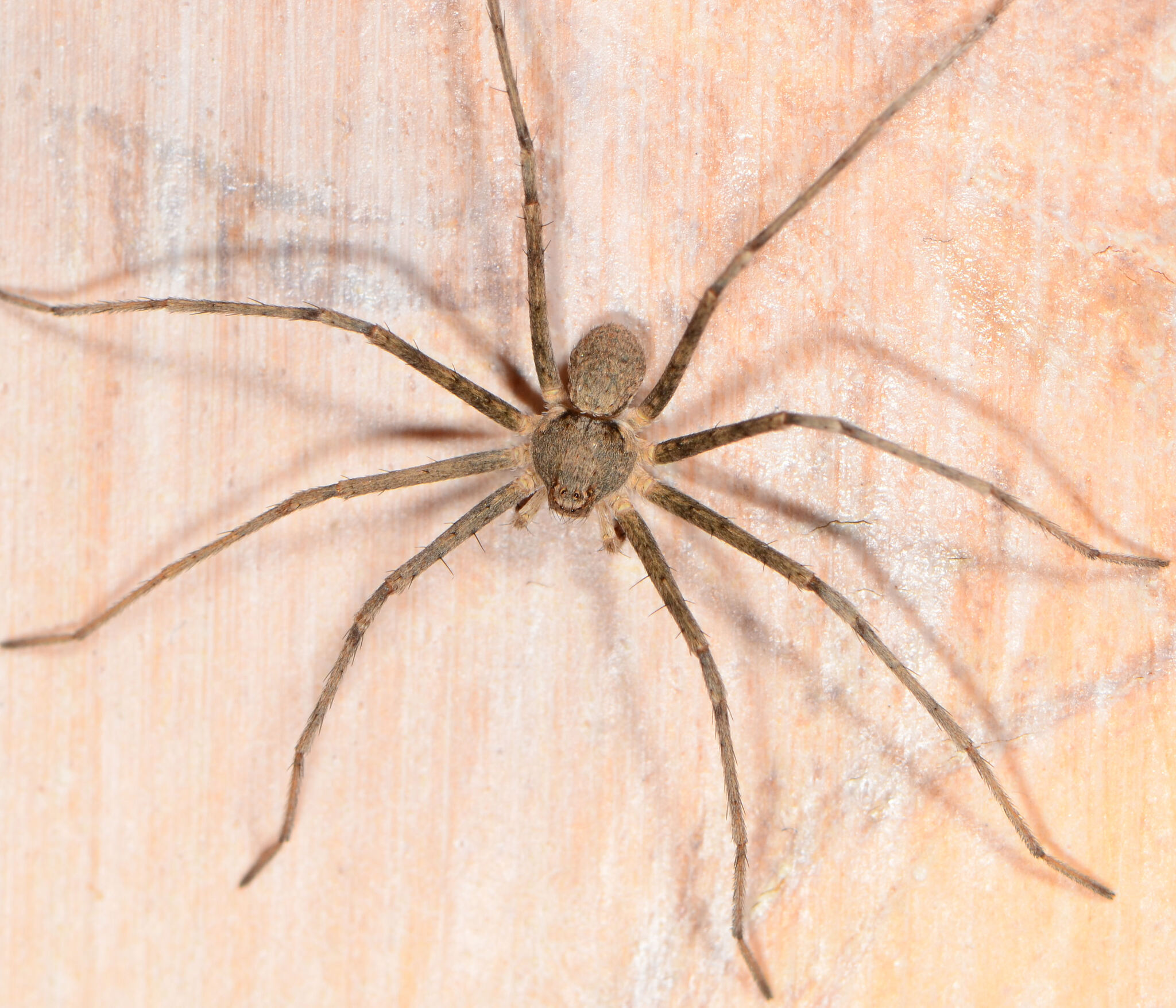
male

== Conservation ==
Hirriusa arenacea is listed as Least Concern by the South African National Biodiversity Institute due to its wide range. The species is protected in several protected areas.

== Etymology ==
The specific name means "sandy" in Latin.

== Taxonomy ==
The species was originally described by Lawrence (1927) as Hirrius arenaceus from Namibia. The genus has not been revised and the species is known from both sexes.
