= Pterartoria fissivittata =

Grahamstown Pterartoria wolf spider

Scientific classification
- Kingdom: Animalia
- Phylum: Arthropoda
- Subphylum: Chelicerata
- Class: Arachnida
- Order: Araneae
- Infraorder: Araneomorphae
- Family: Lycosidae
- Genus: Pterartoria
- Species: P. fissivittata

Binomial name
- Pterartoria fissivittata Purcell, 1903

Species of spider

Pterartoria fissivittata is a species of spider in the family Lycosidae. It is endemic to South Africa and is commonly known as the Grahamstown Pterartoria wolf spider.

== Distribution ==
Pterartoria fissivittata is found in South Africa. It is known only from the type locality Grahamstown in the Eastern Cape province. The species was sampled in 1899 at an altitude of 552 m.

== Habitat and ecology ==
Pterartoria fissivittata is a free-running ground dwelling spider sampled from the Thicket biome.

== Conservation ==
Pterartoria fissivittata is listed as Data Deficient for Taxonomic purposes by the South African National Biodiversity Institute. The status of the species remains obscure and additional sampling is needed to collect males and determine the species' range.

== Taxonomy ==
Pterartoria fissivittata was described by Purcell in 1903 from Grahamstown. The species was revised by Russell-Smith and Roberts in 2017 and is known only from females.
