= Pterartoriola =

Scientific classification
- Kingdom: Animalia
- Phylum: Arthropoda
- Subphylum: Chelicerata
- Class: Arachnida
- Order: Araneae
- Infraorder: Araneomorphae
- Family: Lycosidae
- Genus: Pterartoriola; Roewer

Species
- Pterartoriola caldaria (Purcell, 1903) - South Africa; Pterartoriola lativittata (Purcell, 1903) - South Africa; Pterartoriola lompobattangi (Merian, 1911) - Indonesia (Sulawesi); Pterartoriola sagae (Purcell, 1903) - South Africa; Pterartoriola subcrucifera (Purcell, 1903) - South Africa

Genus of spiders

Pterartoriola is a genus of spiders in the family Lycosidae. It was first described in 1959 by Roewer. As of 2017, it contains 5 species.
