= Cederberg =

Mountain range in Western Cape, South Africa

Cederberg Wilderness Area
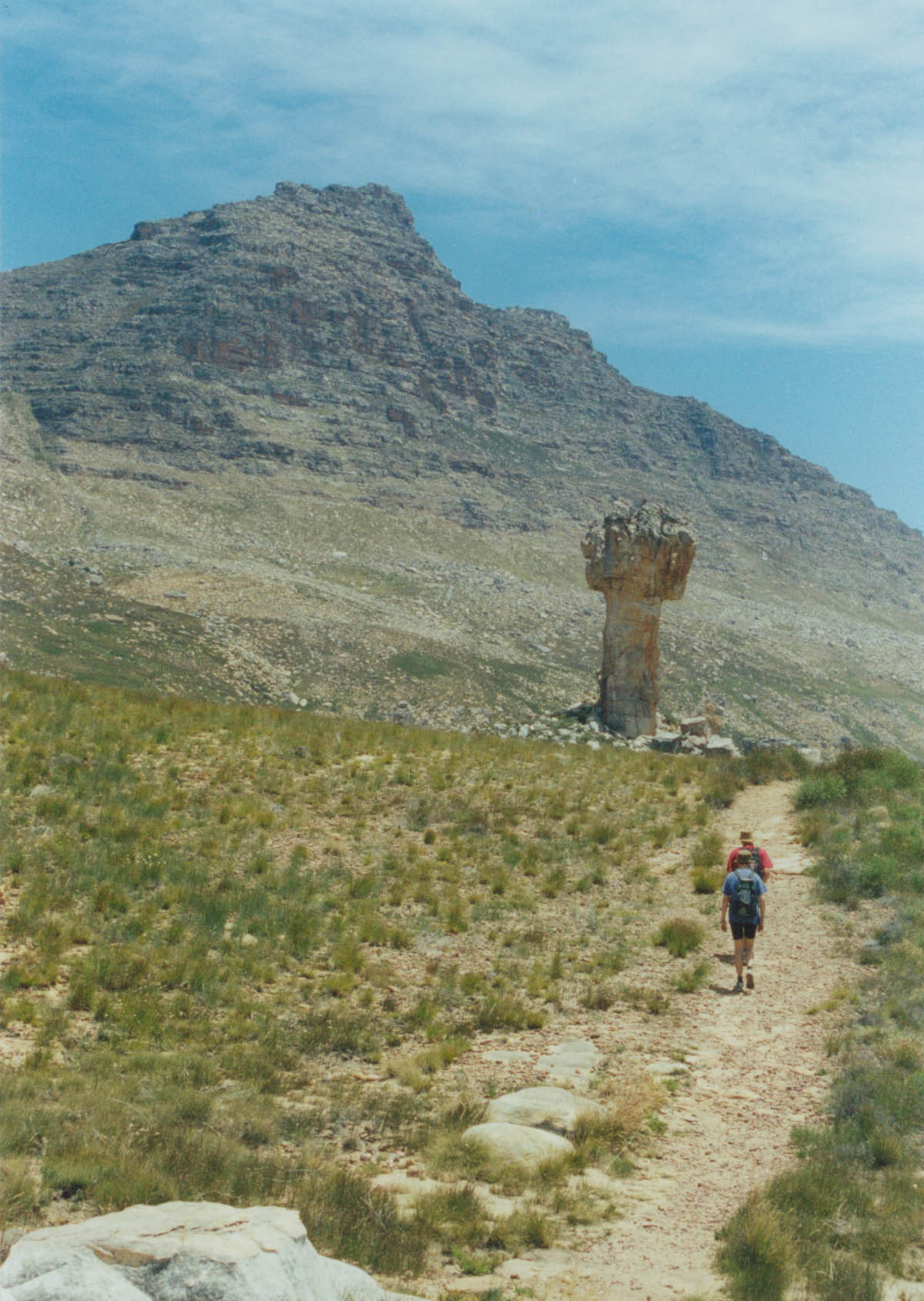
- Sneeuberg, the highest peak in the Cederberg, with the Maltese Cross in the foreground.

- Location within Western Cape
- Location: West Coast, Western Cape, South Africa
- Nearest city: Clanwilliam
- Coordinates: 32°20′S 19°5′E
- Area: 710 km^{2} (270 sq mi)
- Established: 1973
- Governing body: CapeNature
- World Heritage site: 2004 (Cape Floral Region Protected Areas)
- Website: www.capenature.co.za/reserves/cederberg-wilderness-area/

UNESCO World Heritage Site
- Part of: Cape Floral Region Protected Areas
- Criteria: Natural: ix, x
- Reference: 1007-002
- Inscription: 2004 (28th Session)
- Extensions: 2015

The Cederberg mountains are located near Clanwilliam, approximately 300 km (190 mi) north of Cape Town, South Africa at about 32°30′S 19°0′E. The mountain range is named after the endangered Clanwilliam cedar (Widdringtonia cedarbergensis), which is a tree endemic to the area. The mountains are noted for dramatic rock formations and San rock art. The Cederberg Wilderness Area is administered by CapeNature.

Cederberg is now the generally accepted spelling for the area, which combines the English (Cedarberg) and Afrikaans (Sederberg) variants.

== Geography and climate ==
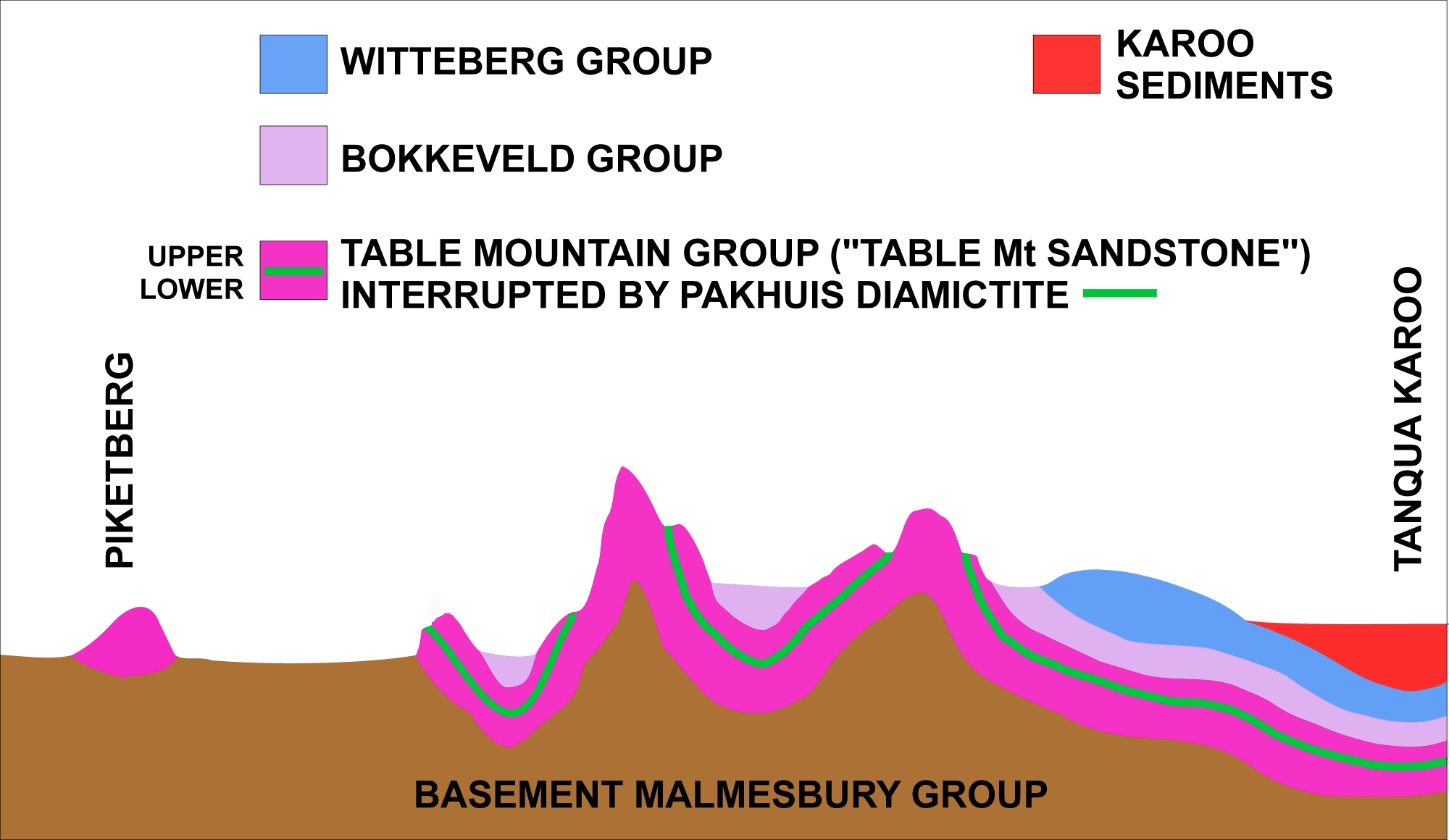
Schematic diagram of an approximate 100 km west–east (left to right) geological cross-section through the Cederberg (a portion of the Cape Fold Belt to which Table Mountain on the Cape Peninsula also belongs). The rocky layers (in different colours) belong to the Cape Supergroup. The green layer is the Pakhuis Formation (a sediment, called "tillite", left by glaciers which for a short time crossed this area about 450 million years ago). It divides the Peninsula Formation Sandstone (or Table Mountain Sandstone) (magenta layer) into a Lower and Upper portion. It is the Lower (older) portion that is particularly hard and erosion resistant, and, therefore, forms most of the highest and most conspicuous peaks in the Cederberg and elsewhere in the Western Cape. The Upper Peninsula Formation, above the Pakhuis tillite layer, is considerably softer and more easily eroded than the lower Formation. In the Cederberg it has been sculpted by wind erosion into many fantastic shapes and caverns, for which these mountains have become famous. The bottoms of the valleys are covered by the Bokkeveld mudstones on which the Western Cape's vineyards and fruit orchards thrive. The Witteberg Formation further inland is the topmost layer of the Cape Supergroup, and is only exposed in the Karoo – the Swartruggens hills in the very arid Tanqua Karoo, in this case.

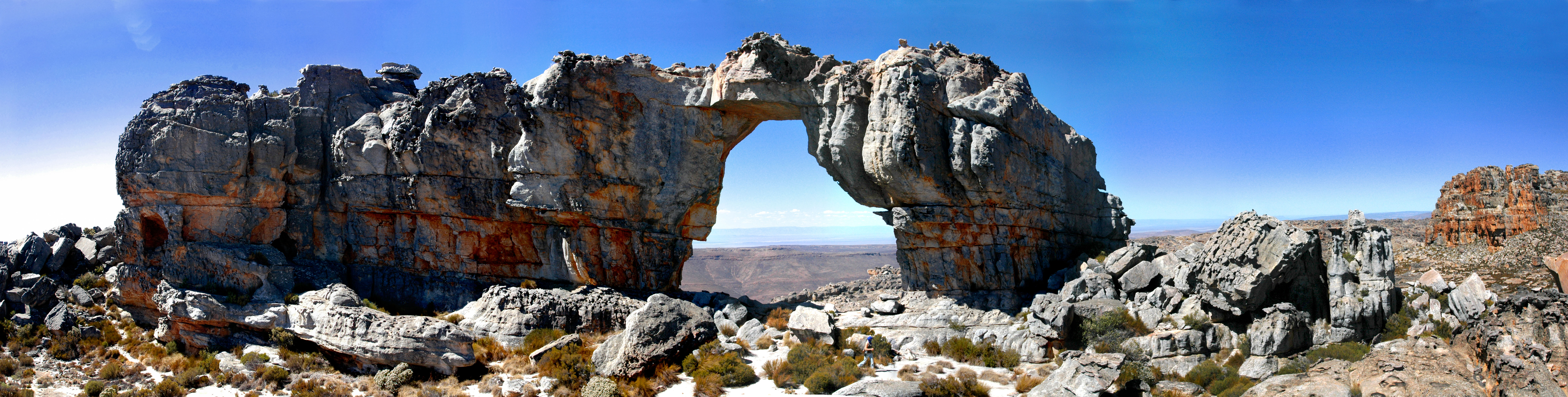
Wolfberg Arch sculpted from the Upper Peninsula Formation Sandstone rocks by wind erosion.

The Cederberg mountains extend about 50 km (31 mi) north–south by 20 km (12 mi) east–west. They are bordered on the west by the Sandveld, the north by the Pakhuis Mountains, the east by the Springbok Flats and the south by the Kouebokkeveld Mountains and the Skurweberge. The main access road, the N7, runs to the west of the range. The nearest towns are Citrusdal to the southwest and Clanwilliam to the north. The area is sparsely populated.

There are several notable mountains in the range, including Sneeuberg (2,026 m (6,647 ft)) and Tafelberg (1,969 m (6,460 ft)). Tafelberg (Afrikaans for "Table Mountain") should not be confused with the Table Mountain in Cape Town. Notable landmarks include the Maltese Cross, Wolfberg Arch and Wolfberg Cracks.

The dominating characteristic of the area is sharply defined sandstone rock formations (Table Mountain Group), often reddish in colour. This group of rocks contains bands of shale and in recent years a few important fossils have been discovered in these argillaceous layers. The fossils are of primitive fish and date back 450 million years to the Ordovician Period.

The summers are very hot and dry, while the winters are wetter and cold with typical annual rainfall in the low-lying areas of less than 700 mm (28 in). The higher peaks receive a dusting of snow in winter. Summer days are typically clear and cloudless. Due to the clear skies most of the year, it makes an excellent site for skywatching and has its own amateur observatory.

== Flora and fauna ==
The predominant vegetation is Mediterranean fynbos in the wetter south and west, changing to semi desert scrub in the north and east. The endangered Clanwilliam cedar (Widdringtonia cedarbergensis) of the family Cupressaceae and the snow protea (Protea cryophila) of the Proteaceae are endemic to the area, found only in more remote areas high up in the mountains.

The area's apex predators are the felids leopard (Panthera pardus) and caracal (Caracal caracal). Other mammals include the rock hyrax (Procavia capensis) or "dassie", meerkats (Suricata suricatta) and other mongooses (Herpestidae), larger antelopes (e.g. bontebok Damaliscus pygargus dorcas and gemsbok Oryx gazella), the vulnerable Cape mountain zebra (Equus zebra zebra), and chacma baboons (Papio ursinus). There are also many birds, small mammals, reptiles and insects.

Other threatened species found in the Cederberg Wilderness Area include the cyprinids Clanwilliam yellowfish (Labeobarbus capensis, vulnerable), Clanwilliam redfin (Barbus calidus, vulnerable) and sawfin (Barbus serra, endangered).

== Human activity ==
=== Historical ===
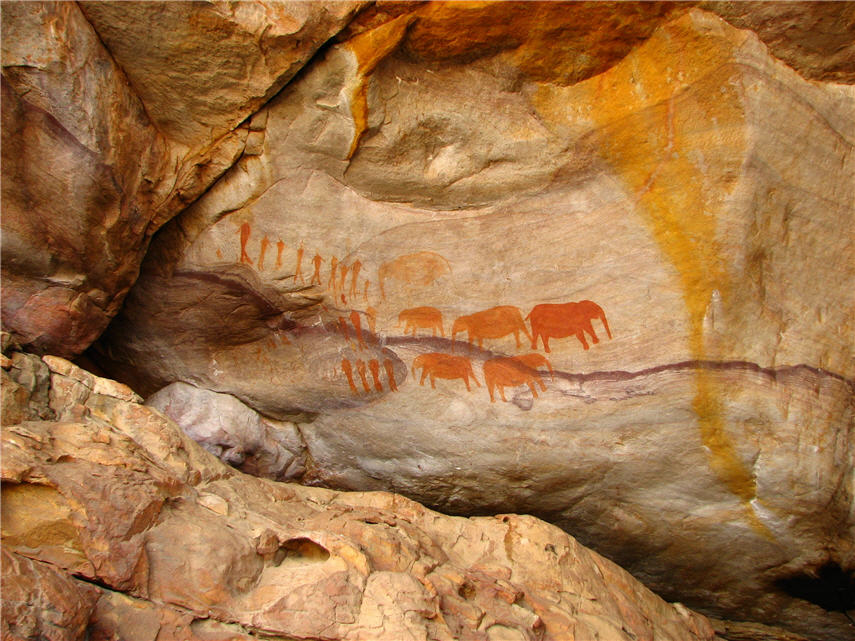
San rock art near Stadsaal Cave, Matjiesrivier Nature Reserve in the Cederberg

In caves and overhangs throughout the area, San rock art can be found, evidence of the earliest human inhabitants. European settlement brought forestry and some agriculture, and led to massive destruction of the local cedar trees, with thousands felled for telephone poles, furniture and housing. The European arrival also led to the elimination of the San population. In the north, the old Moravian mission station of Wupperthal still remains, the heart of a small subsistence farming community, and home to a local industry producing veldskoene, traditional soft leather shoes.

The Cederberg was possibly the southernmost battleground of the Second Boer War. A small band of Boer guerrillas penetrated into this area from the Boer republics, hundreds of kilometres to the north, hoping to stir up popular support amongst the local farmers of Dutch descent. In this they failed; the farmers may have had little sympathy for the British but they had a fair notion of who was going to win the war. It is said that the Boer commandos were confronted in the Cederberg by a lone Englishman, who ordered them to surrender. They laughed at him, because he was one and they were many and tried to reason with him, pointing out the hopelessness of his position. He refused to back down and was in the end shot dead. The place where he fell is today called Engelsmanskloof ("Englishman's ravine").

=== Agriculture ===
Arable land is limited by the altitude, the dry climate, and the rocky terrain, and few farms exist. Rooibos tea is the area's most famous export, though fruit and tobacco are also harvested on some farms. The Cederberg area includes one winery, the highest in South Africa. Around the Wupperthal area are a number of subsistence farms. Some commercial pine plantations remain around the Algeria forest station. Proteas and other fynbos plants are also grown. A number of farms have become predominantly guest farms catering for the local and international tourist market.

=== Tourism ===
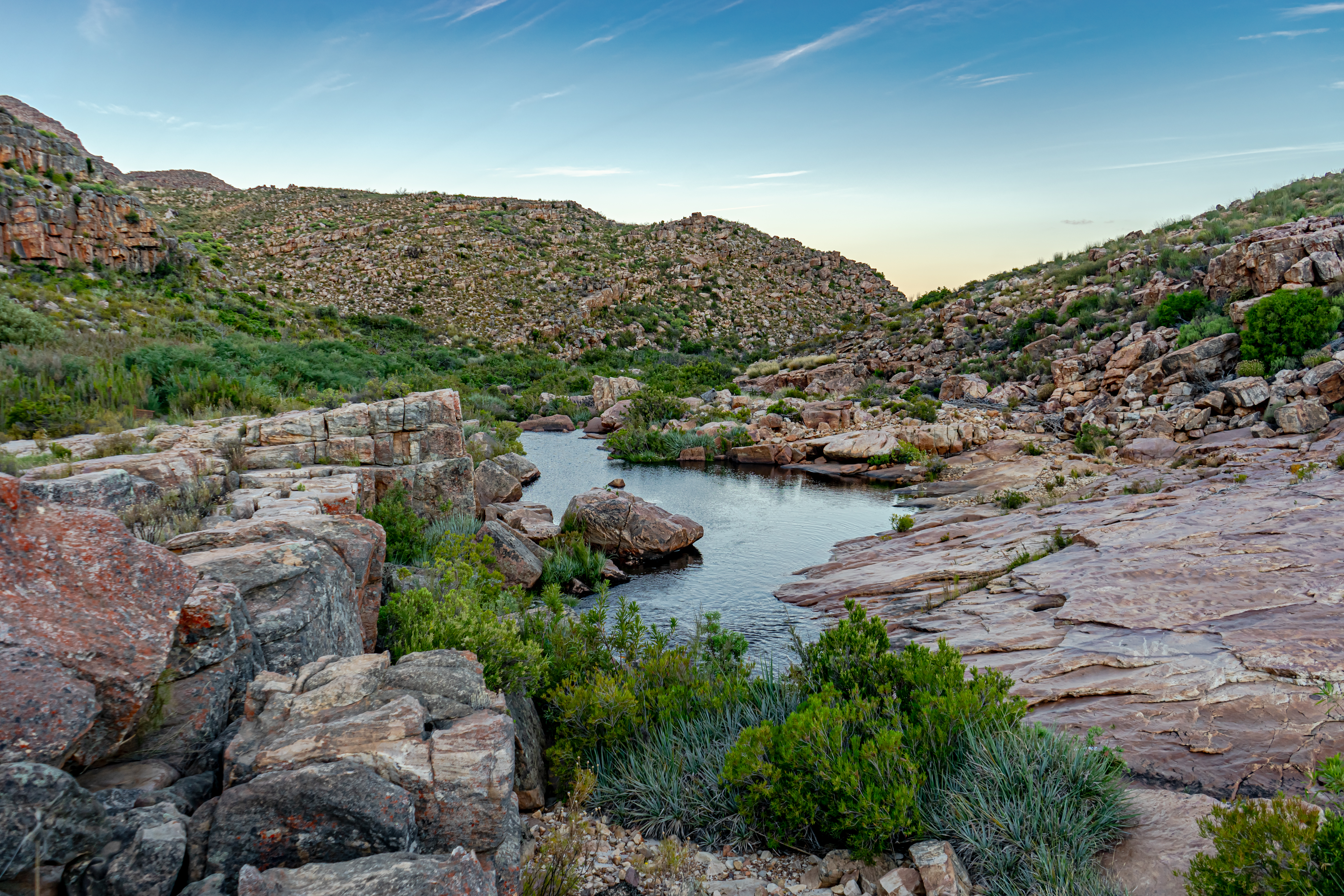
Rock pool in a river in the Cederberg Conservancy

As a wilderness area, the primary activity is eco-tourism, including camping, rock climbing and hiking. The main campsite, Algeria, is operated by CapeNature, while others such as Sanddrif, Driehoek, Jamaka and Kromrivier are privately operated and form the Cedarberg Conservancy, a voluntary association of landowners.

The Cederberg is renowned for its quality of rock climbing routes particularly around the Krakadouw and Tafelberg peaks. The Table Mountain Sandstone creates ideal conditions for spectacular routes. There are numerous day and overnight hikes including the popular and spectacular Wolfberg Arch, Wolfberg Cracks and the Maltese Cross.

The area is also home to an amateur astronomical observatory, which regularly hosts open evenings for the public.

There are various 4x4 routes.

A large tract of the northern Cederberg is owned by the Moravian Church. The quaint village of Wupperthal forms part of a mission station route that provides visitors with an interesting view of rural life. The village is also a well known centre for hand-made leather shoes and boots. One of the "buite stasies" (directly translated as outer stations) is Heuningvlei, a small picturesque hamlet that is in the process of developing a donkey cart trail from the summit of Pakhuis Pass to the hamlet. The project, a poverty alleviation project funded by the Department of Environmental Affairs and Tourism, includes the creation of backpacking accommodation, herb garden and various other tourism offerings.

=== Scouting ===
The Cederberg is also the site of the Senior Scout Adventure, a 12-day event for Scouts run every second year by Scouts South Africa.
