= Oorlogskloof Nature Reserve =

Nature reserve in South Africa

- Oorlogskloof Natuurreservaat
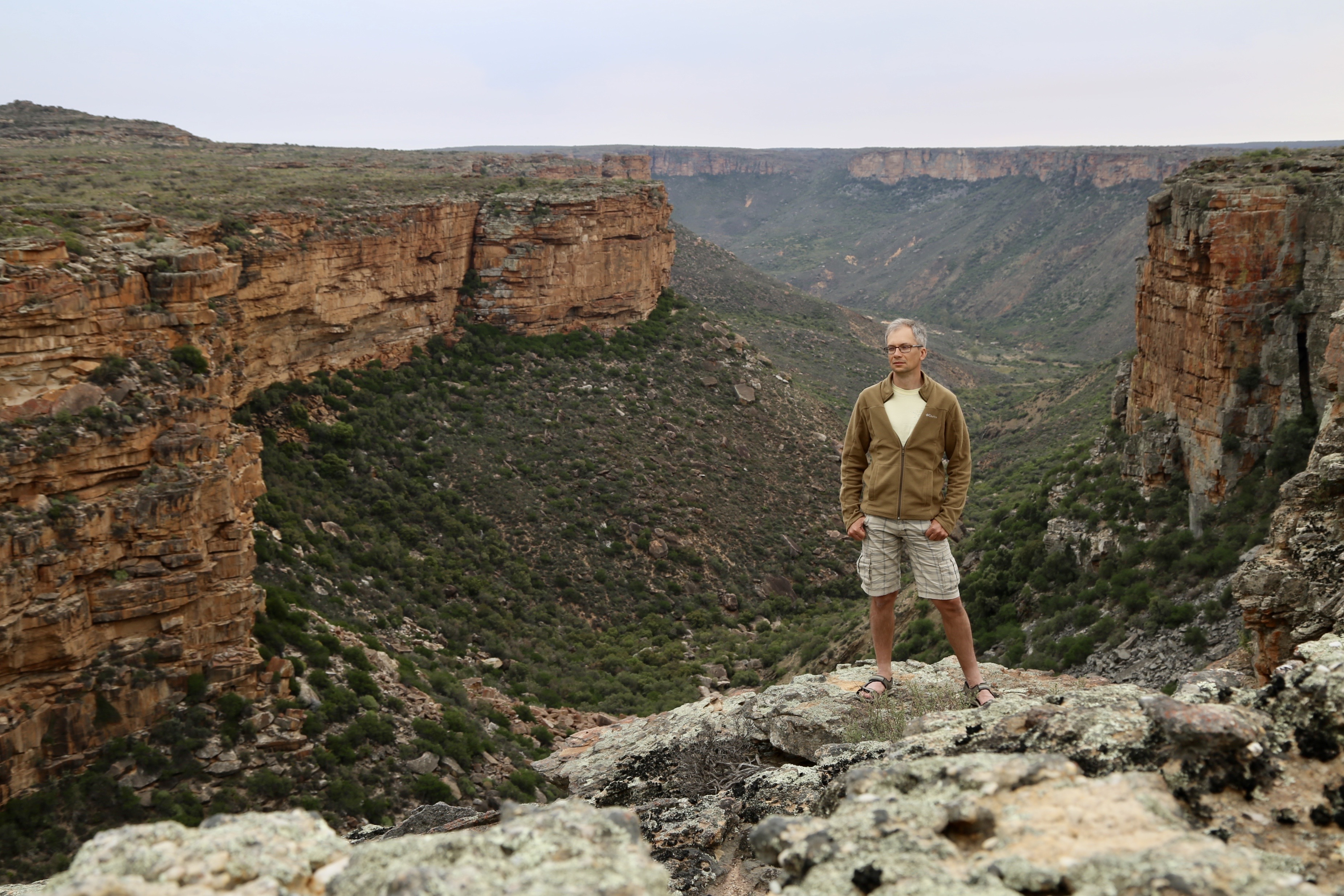
- Type: Nature Reserve
- Location: Nieuwoudtville
- Coordinates: 31°29′26″S 19°02′54″E
- Area: 4,776 hectares (11,800 acres)
- Designated: 1971; 54 years ago
- Camp sites: 10
- Hiking trails: Four (2 day trails; 2 overnight trails)
- Website: Northern Cape Tourism
- Oorlogskloof Nature Reserve (South Africa) Oorlogskloof Nature Reserve (Northern Cape)

The Oorlogskloof Nature Reserve (Afrikaans for war-gorge), covers 4,776 hectares (11,800 acres) and is located 10 km south of Nieuwoudtville in the Northern Cape, South Africa.

== Geography ==
The Oorlogskloof River gorge runs along the eastern border of the reserve; the western part is bordered by the Knersvlakte. Numerous streams dissect the mountainous terrain, resulting in gorges, 36 natural pools and waterfalls throughout the reserve.

There are also examples of rock art in caves found beside some of the plateaus of the reserve.

== History ==
The reserve got its name from a battle that took place between indigenous Khoi people and local farmers in 1739.

In 1971 it was declared a nature reserve.

In 2012, the Department of Environmental Affairs funded the construction of 10 log cabins that accommodates 15 people each, along with solar panels and septic tanks, pedestrian bridges, stream crossings and 3 boreholes. Alien invasive species like Black Wattle, Port Jackson, Eucalyptus and Prosopis were also removed at certain locations. And hiking trails and access roads were serviced.

== Habitat ==
Oorlogskloof Nature Reserve is found in the Karoo and Fynbos biomes. The wagon tree, Protea nitida, and a diverse range of Namaqualand flowers can be found here.

=== Birds ===
The reserve contains a multitude of bird species, which include Verreaux’s eagles, booted eagles, black storks and African harrier-hawk.

=== Fish ===
The following fish species can be found on the river in the reserve:

- Clanwilliam yellowfish
- Clanwilliam sandfish
- Chubbyhead barb
- Sawfin

There are also the unwanted local species of banded tilapia, and alien bass and bluegill sunfish, which pose a major threat to the endemic fish found in the reserve. Freshwater mussels can also be found in pools in the reserve.

== Trails ==
There are a couple of day and overnight trails (that take 4-5 days to complete), totalling 146 km in length, with 10 log cabins.

=== Day trails ===
1. Leopard Trap Day Trail - 15.5 km
2. Rietvlei Day Trail - 17.9 km

=== Overnight trails ===
1. Oorlogskloof Rock Pigeon Trail - 52.2 km and takes 5 days to complete.
2. Rameron Pigeon Trail - 52.4 km and takes 4-7 days to complete.

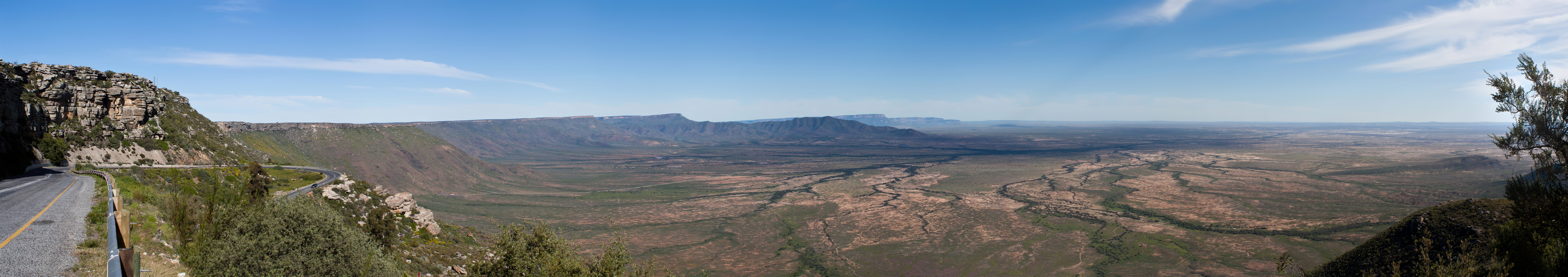
View from near the top of Vanrhyns Pass, near Nieuwoudtville, South Africa. The flat top of the Maskam is partially obscured by a ridge of the Koebee Mountains, and beyond it the Gifberg and both peaks of the Matzikama Mountains. Part of the Knersvlakte region is visible to the east.

== See also ==
- List of protected areas of South Africa

== Sources ==
- Stuart, Chris & Mathilde (2012). National Parks and Nature Reserves. Struik Travel and Heritage. ISBN 978-1-77007-742-3.
- Erasmus, B.P.J. (1995). Op Pad in Suid-Afrika. ISBN 1-86842-026-4.
