= Riet River (Doring) =

River in the Western Cape, South Africa

- Location of the Riet River mouth
- Etymology: From the word for "reed" in the Afrikaans language

Location
- Country: South Africa
- Province: Western Cape

Physical characteristics
- Source
  - location: Koue Bokkeveld
- Source confluence: Winkelhaak / Houdenbeks
  - coordinates: 33°09′30″S 19°26′06″E
  - elevation: 971 m (3,186 ft)
- Mouth: Doring River
  - location: De Mond
  - coordinates: 32°30′47″S 19°33′18″E
  - elevation: 392 m (1,286 ft)

The Riet River (Afrikaans: Rietrivier) is a river in the Western Cape Province, South Africa. It is part of the Olifants/Doring River system.

== Course ==
It originates in the Koue Bokkeveld Mountains north of Ceres at the confluence of the Winkelhaak River and Houdenbeks River, flowing roughly northwards. After the Groot River joins its left bank, the Riet turns eastwards. Below this confluence, the Riet River is joined by the Brandkraals River on its right bank and by the Matjies River on its left side, after which it flows into the Doring River at a place known as De Mond.

== Ecology ==
The Clanwilliam Yellowfish (Labeobarbus capensis), a local endemic species classified as Vulnerable by the IUCN, is still found in the Doring and other rivers of its basin.

== See also ==
- List of rivers of South Africa
