= Sawfin =

Conservation status
- Near Threatened (IUCN 3.1)

Scientific classification
- Kingdom: Animalia
- Phylum: Chordata
- Class: Actinopterygii
- Order: Cypriniformes
- Family: Cyprinidae
- Genus: Cheilobarbus
- Species: C. serra

Binomial name
- Cheilobarbus serra W. K. H. Peters, 1864

Synonyms
- Barbus serra Pseudobarbus serra

Species of fish

The sawfin (Cheilobarbus serra), also known as Clanwilliam sawfin, is a ray-finned fish species in the family Cyprinidae. It was formerly placed with the South African redfins in Pseudobarbus. It is tetraploid. Its closest living relative is the Cape whitefish (C. capensis). This sizeable cyprinid can grow to over 40 centimetres (16 in) long and weigh more than 3 kg (6 lb 10 oz).

== Distribution and ecology ==
It is endemic to the Western Cape Province of South Africa, where it was formerly widespread in the Olifants River and its tributaries. Its range has decreased throughout most of the 20th century, and now it is apparently only found in the upper Olifants River as well as the Biedou, Doring, Driehoeks, Jan Dissels, Oorlogskloof, Ratels and Tra Tra Rivers.

It is rather euryoecious, inhabiting a wide variety of small and large rivers. While young fish are common in pools in the foothills, adults will move further down to where the rivers enter the coastal plain and the water is deeper. The sawfin is omnivorous, but mainly eats aquatic insects and their larvae. Its breeding season runs from late spring to summer (October to December), when schools of adults form to migrate upriver to shallow riffles with cobble substrate, where they spawn. This species is long-lived and slow-growing, with yearlings being about 10 cm (3.9 in) long. It is only half-grown at about 4 years of age, and can get more than 10 years old.

== Status and conservation ==
This species is considered Near Threatened by the IUCN, as it has declined much between the 1930s and 1970s. This seems to have been mainly due to the introduced smallmouth bass (Micropterus dolomieu), which can kill off entire subpopulations by eating the juveniles. Clanwilliam yellowfish (Labeobarbus seeberi) might be regarded as a competitor for food, but this is apparently not significant. Other threats are water pollution and overuse, mainly due to agriculture. Overall however, its stocks are healthy wherever the smallmouth bass is absent, but this still restricts its range quite a lot.

It is also listed as Endangered by the Nature Conservation Ordinance of Western Cape Province. For the time being, it may not be killed or caught. Considerable populations are found in the Cederberg Wilderness Area, Matjies River Nature Reserve and Oorlogskloof Nature Reserve. In 2004, the Greater Cederberg Biodiversity Corridor was established by CapeNature and private landowners to better preserve and develop high-quality habitat. This project aims at restoring the river ecosystems for sustainable development. The sawfin has been bred in captivity at the Clanwilliam Yellowfish Conservation Station, but captive breeding success is not sufficient and improved techniques are needed.
