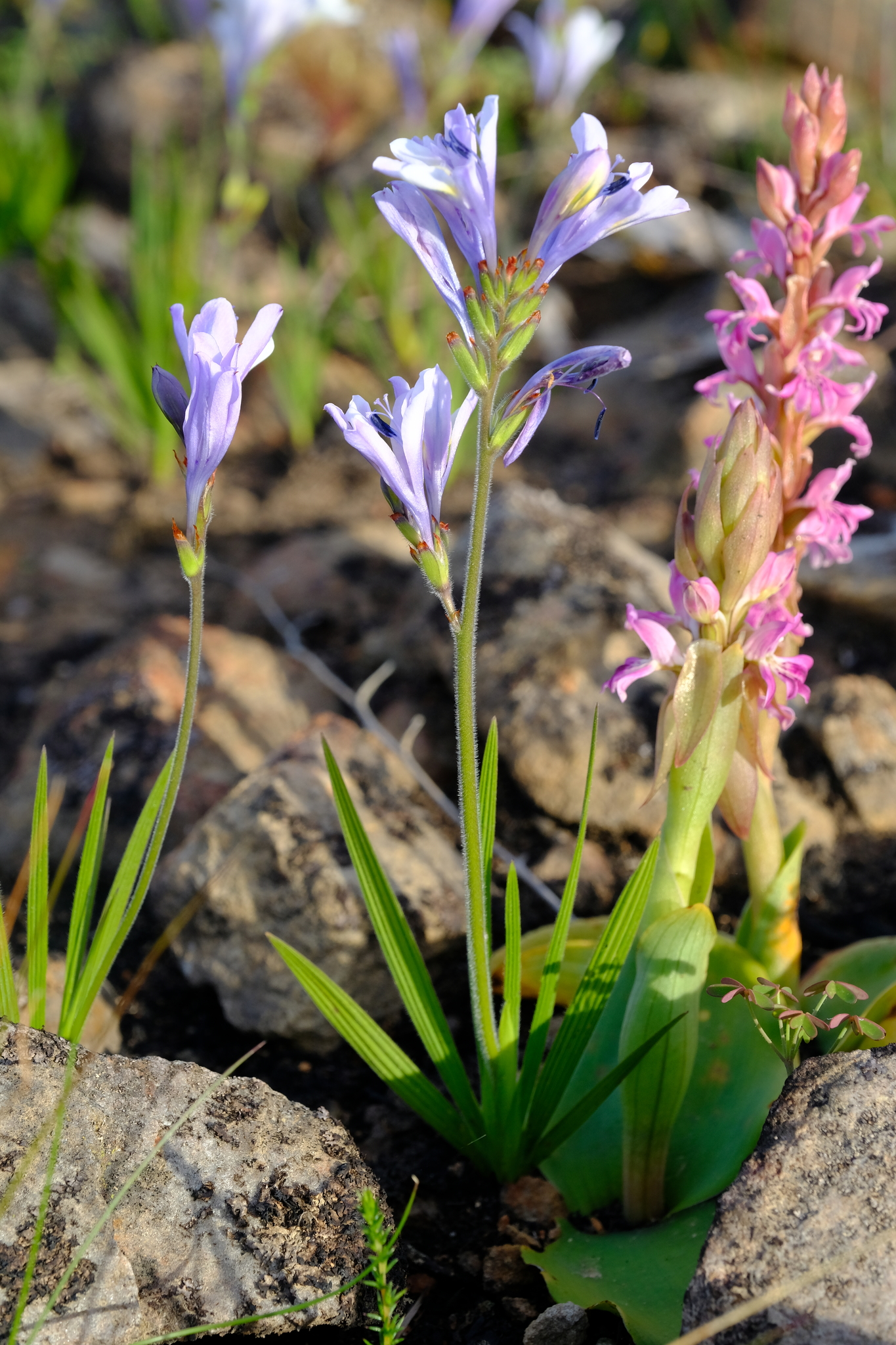

Scientific classification
- Kingdom: Plantae
- Clade: Tracheophytes
- Clade: Angiosperms
- Clade: Monocots
- Order: Asparagales
- Family: Iridaceae
- Genus: Babiana
- Species: B. lineolata

Binomial name
- Babiana lineolata Klatt

= Babiana lineolata =

Species of flowering plant

Babiana lineolata is a perennial flowering plant and geophyte belonging to the genus Babiana. The species is endemic to the Western Cape and occurs in the Koue Bokkeveld, southern Olifants River Valley and on the Piketberg. The plant has already lost 45% of its habitat to crop cultivation and the fields are still being expanded in the Sandveld, north of Piketberg. The plant was last seen in the Olifants River Valley at Citrusdal in 1945 and is considered locally extinct.
