= Sedercypris =

Scientific classification
- Kingdom: Animalia
- Phylum: Chordata
- Class: Actinopterygii
- Order: Cypriniformes
- Family: Cyprinidae
- Subfamily: Smiliogastrinae
- Genus: Sedercypris; Skelton, Swartz & Vreven, 2018

Type species
- Barbus calidus Barnard, 1938

Species
- 2 species, see text

Genus of fishes

Sedercypris, commonly known as Cedarberg redfins, is a genus of fish in the family Cyprinidae endemic to the Clanwilliam Olifants River system in South Africa.

The following species are classified in this genus:

- Sedercypris calidus (Barnard, 1938) (Clanwilliam redfin)
- Sedercypris erubescens (Skelton, 1974) (Twee River redfin)

Both species are tetraploid, like Pseudobarbus redfins, from which they were separated in 2018. The distinction from all other southern African tetraploid genera is having six or seven branched rays in the anal fin.

== Etymology ==
Sedercypris is named after the Cedarberg region they inhabit. The Afrikaans spelling was adopted for the name to avoid the possible confusion with the genus Cheilobarbus when abbreviated to an initial in text.
