= Groot River (Western Cape) =

River in the Western Cape, South Africa

- Location of the Groot River mouth
- Etymology: From Grootrivier, meaning "big river" in the Afrikaans language

Location
- Country: South Africa
- State: Western Cape

Physical characteristics
- Source: _
  - location: Cederberg Mountains
- Source confluence: Twee / Lang
  - coordinates: 32°46′29″S 19°17′35″E
  - elevation: 735 m (2,411 ft)
- Mouth: Riet River
  - location: Confluence with the Riet River, Western Cape
  - coordinates: 32°36′48″S 19°27′10″E
  - elevation: 456 m (1,496 ft)

The Groot River (English: "Large River") is a river in the Western Cape Province, South Africa. It is part of the Olifants/Doring River system. It is not to be confused with the Groot River of Eastern Cape or the Groot River of Southern Cape provinces.

== Course ==
It is formed by the confluence of the Twee River and Lang River, flowing off the eastern slopes of the Cederberg Mountains, south-east of Citrusdal.

The Groot flows in an easterly direction through the Skurweberge Mountains where it joins the Riet River that rises as the Winkelhaak River and Houdenbeks River north of Ceres. Below this confluence, the Riet River is joined by the Brandkraals River and Matjies River, after which it flows into the Doring River.

== Ecology ==
The Clanwilliam Yellowfish (Labeobarbus capensis), a local endemic classified as Vulnerable by the IUCN, is found in this river.

== See also ==
- List of rivers of South Africa
