= Austroglanis barnardi =

Conservation status
- Endangered (IUCN 3.1)

Scientific classification
- Kingdom: Animalia
- Phylum: Chordata
- Class: Actinopterygii
- Order: Siluriformes
- Family: Austroglanididae
- Genus: Austroglanis
- Species: A. barnardi

Binomial name
- Austroglanis barnardi (P. H. Skelton, 1981)

Species of fish

Austroglanis barnardi, also known as the spotted rock-catfish or Barnard's rock-catfish, is an endangered species of catfish (order Siluriformes). It is one of three members of the family Austroglanididae.

== Biology ==
A. barnardi has a 12-year generation time but nothing more is known about reproduction within the species. It feeds on aquatic insects, benthic invertebrates and other small fishes.

== Habitat ==
This species is endemic to South Africa and is found only in freshwater bodies of subtropical climate. It has only been recorded from the Thee, Noordhoeks and Hex Rivers, which are all small tributaries of the Clanwilliam Olifants River System in the Western Cape, South Africa. It is extremely uncommon in the two streams it inhabits. A. barnardi inhabits riffles among loosely bedded rocks and coarse sand. Its preferred water depth is between 10-60 centimeters. Other species that occur in this area include Pseudobarbus phlegethon, Barbus calidus, and Austroglanis gilli.

== Physical description ==
The fish reach a maximum length of 8 centimeters (3.1 in) SL. The head is flattened with a broad snout, and the eyes are located on the top of the head. The mouth is located on the underside of the head along with fleshy lips. It has three pairs of barbels. It has short, round fins accompanied by weak, curved spines on the pectoral and dorsal fins. Their color is golden-brown with dark brown blotches.

== Threats ==
A. barnardi is threatened by various forms of habitat destruction such as stream channelization, water abstraction, and sedimentation, all of which reduce the incidence of their obligate riffle habitat. Portions of their river habitat are adjacent to agricultural fields and orchards, so it is likely that pesticides and insecticides affect populations. It has been threatened by the introduction of invasive species such as tilapia, smallmouth bass and the bluegill sunfish.

== Conservation ==
Biologists have discussed many conservation methods. In 2013, an alien fish barrier was constructed across a section of the Noordhoeks River to keep Micropterus species from moving upstream from this section of river. Additionally, invasive spotted bass were removed mechanically from sections of the Thee river between 2010 and 2014. No known populations are currently within the boundaries of any provincial nature reserves.
