= Heerenlogement =

Coordinates: 31°57′45.8208″S 18°33′10.26″E

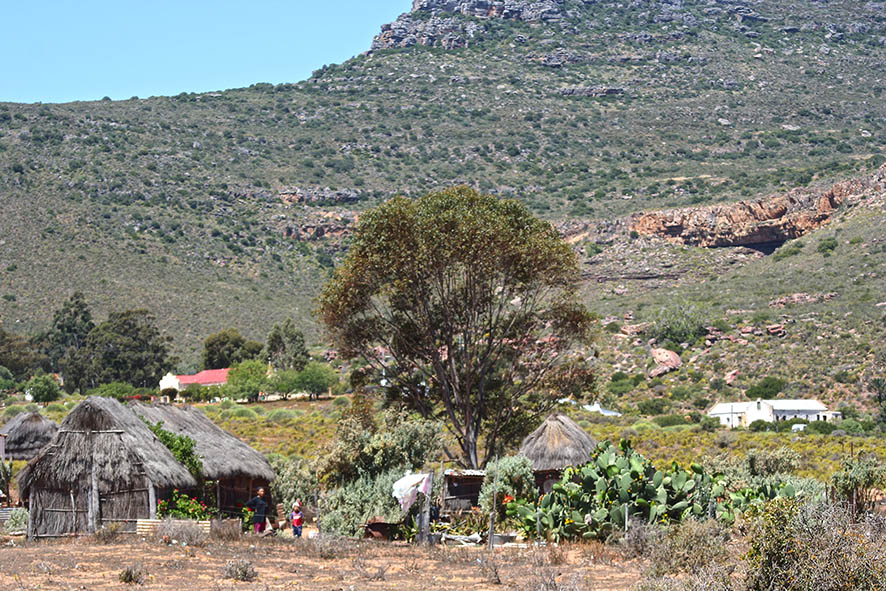
Modern day houses near the Heerenlodgement Cave with the cave entrance visible in the background

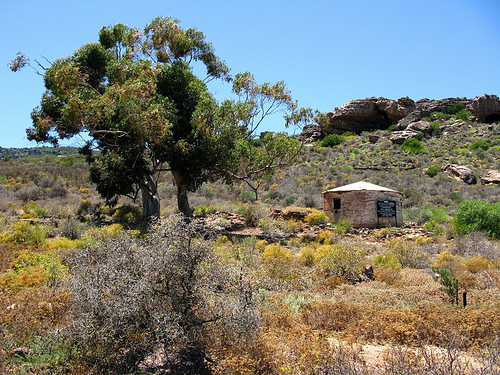
The fort with the cave entrance in the background

Heerenlogement [he:rənloʒəmɛnt] also known as "Gentlemen's Cave", is a historical cave in the northwest of the Western Cape, South Africa, about 30 km north of Graafwater, in the Cederberg municipality, which was used by travellers in the 17th and 18th century as a shelter. The oldest still visible engravings in the Cave were made by Simon van der Stel in 1685, with another by Kaie Jesse Slotsbo from the year 1712. Altogether, approximately 130 visitors have inscribed their names along with their dates on the Cave walls, with 30 leaving only their names, and a further thirteen leaving only their initials.

Olof Bergh and his company first came across the cave in November 1682 while in search of the legendary gold fields of the Monomotapa and were the first Europeans to come across the cave, although Bergh did not engrave his name as many others did.

Located near to the cave, is an old iron British fort dating from the Second Boer War is located near to the cave.
