= Graafwater =

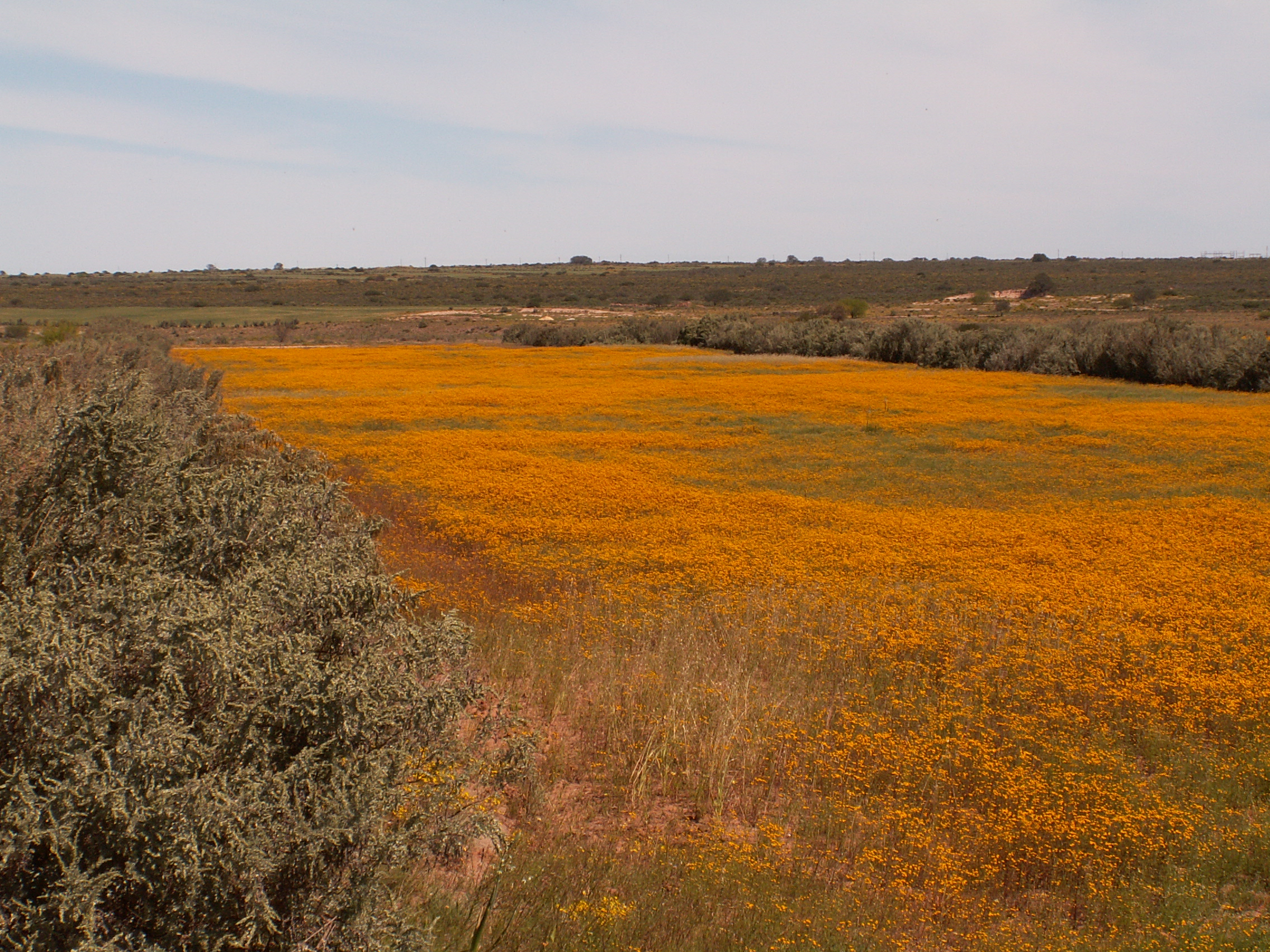

- Location within Western Cape Location within South Africa
- Coordinates: 32°9′S 18°36′E
- Country: South Africa
- Province: Western Cape
- District: West Coast
- Municipality: Cederberg

Area
  - Total: 1.88 km^{2} (0.73 sq mi)

Population (2011)
  - Total: 2,261
  - Density: 1,200/km^{2} (3,110/sq mi)

Racial makeup (2011)
  - Black African: 2.3%
  - Coloured: 83.1%
  - Indian/Asian: 0.2%
  - White: 14.2%
  - Other: 0.1%

First languages (2011)
  - Afrikaans: 97.4%
  - English: 1.2%
  - Other: 1.5%
- Time zone: UTC+2 (SAST)
- Postal code (street): 8120
- PO box: 8120
- Area code: 027

Graafwater is a town in the Sandveld in the Western Cape province of South Africa situated 300 km from Cape Town, about halfway between Clanwilliam and Lamberts Bay. Graafwater is the Afrikaans term for "digging for water" referring to the Afrikaans farming culture found in South Africa at the time of establishment. It is located in the Cederberg Municipality.

Graafwater is often divided into Graafwater North and Graafwater South.

After the railway junction between Cape Town and Bitterfontein was built in 1910, the town Graafwater was established. The local Dutch Reformed Church of Leipoldtville developed the town further. The Graafwater Dutch Reformed church formed its own congregation after a few years.

== Tourist attractions ==
- The Heerenlogement - A cave about 30 km from the town that 'lodged' both Simon van der Stel and Olaff Bergh.
