= Cederberg Local Municipality =

Cederberg
- Local municipality
- Seal

- Location in the Western Cape
- Coordinates: 32°15′S 19°00′E
- Country: South Africa
- Province: Western Cape
- District: West Coast
- Seat: Clanwilliam
- Wards: 6

Government
  - Type: Municipal council
  - Mayor: Azrial Scheepers (ANC)
  - Deputy Mayor: Ruben Richards
  - Speaker: Maxwell Heins

Area
  - Total: 8,007 km^{2} (3,092 sq mi)

Population (2022)
  - Total: 55,108
  - Density: 6.882/km^{2} (17.83/sq mi)

Racial makeup (2022)
  - Black African: 21.8%
  - Coloured: 68.9%
  - Indian/Asian: 0.1%
  - White: 7.9%

First languages (2011)
  - Afrikaans: 88.7%
  - Xhosa: 5.0%
  - Sotho: 2.5%
  - English: 1.9%
  - Other: 1.9%
- Time zone: UTC+2 (SAST)
- Municipal code: WC012

Cederberg Municipality (Afrikaans: Cederberg Munisipaliteit) is a local municipality which governs an area of the Western Cape province of South Africa stretching from the Cederberg mountains through the middle valley of the Olifants River to the Atlantic coast. It includes the towns of Clanwilliam, Citrusdal and Lamberts Bay, and the surrounding villages and farms. As of 2011 it had a population of 49,768. It is located within the West Coast District Municipality and its municipality code is WC012.

== Geography ==
Topographic map of the Cederberg Local Municipality

The municipality covers a total area of 8,007 square kilometres (3,092 sq mi), stretching from the Atlantic Ocean in the west to the Doring River in the east. The Olifants River flows from south to north through the center of the municipal area. The Cederberg mountains rise from the eastern bank of the river. To the west of the river are lower ranges of hills descending to the coastal plain. The municipality abuts on the Matzikama Municipality to the north, the Hantam Municipality to the east, and the Witzenberg and Bergrivier Municipalities to the south.

== Demographics ==
The population of the Cederberg Municipality was 55,108 people according to the 2022 census, an annual increase of 0.99% from 2011. Those identifying as "Coloured" comprised 68.9% of the population, followed by "Black African" at 21.8% and "White" at 7.9%.

According to the 2011 census the municipality has a population of 49,768 people in 13,513 households. Of this population, 75.7% describe themselves as "Coloured", 12.7% as "Black African", and 11.0% as "White". The first language of 88.7% of the population is Afrikaans, while 5.0% speak Xhosa, 2.5% speak Sotho and 1.9% speak English.

The principal towns of the municipality are Clanwilliam (pop. 7,674) and Citrusdal (pop. 7,177) in the Olifants River valley, and Lambert's Bay (pop. 6,120) on the coastline. There are smaller agricultural settlements at Graafwater (pop. 2,261) and Leipoldtville (pop. 298), and a coastal village at Elands Bay (pop. 1,525).

== History ==
At the end of the apartheid era, in the area that is today the Cederberg Municipality, there were municipal councils for the towns of Clanwilliam, Citrusdal, Lambert's Bay, and Graafwater. These councils were elected by the white residents, while the coloured residents of the towns were governed by management committees subordinate to the white councils. Rural areas fell under the West Coast Regional Services Council (RSC), while in Elands Bay there was a local council for white residents and a management committee for coloured residents under the authority of the RSC.

While the negotiations to end apartheid were taking place a process was established for local authorities to negotiate voluntary mergers. The four towns in the Cederberg area took part in this process, which resulted in the municipalities merging with their respective management committees to form new non-racial municipalities: Citrusdal in March 1992, Clanwilliam in April 1992, Lambert's Bay in June 1993, and Graafwater in January 1994.

After the national elections of 1994 a process of local government transformation began, in which negotiations were held between the existing local authorities, political parties, and local community organisations. As a result of these negotiations, the existing local authorities were dissolved and transitional local councils (TLCs) were created for each town and village. In January 1995 the municipalities of Clanwilliam, Citrusdal, and Lambert's Bay were replaced by TLCs, and Graafwater followed in the following month. In December 1994, the Elands Bay local council and management committee were merged into the Piketberg TLC (the rest of which lies outside the Cederberg area).

The transitional councils were initially made up of members nominated by the various parties to the negotiations, until May 1996 when elections were held. At these elections the West Coast District Council was established, replacing the West Coast Regional Services Council. Transitional representative councils (TRCs) were also elected to represent rural areas outside the TLCs on the District Council; the area that was to become Cederberg Municipality included the Clanwilliam TRC and parts of the Piketberg and Vanrhynsdorp TRCs.

At the local elections of December 2000 the TLCs and TRCs were dissolved and the Cederberg Municipality was established as a single local authority incorporating both rural and urban areas. In 2011 the Cederberg Wilderness Area, previously a District Management Areas, was added to the municipality when District Management Areas were abolished.

== Politics ==
The municipal council consists of eleven members elected by mixed-member proportional representation. Six councillors are elected by first-past-the-post voting in six wards, while the remaining five are chosen from party lists so that the total number of party representatives is proportional to the number of votes received. In the election of 1 November 2021, the African National Congress (ANC) won a plurality of seats on the council.

On 12 November, the Cederberg First Residents Association (CFRA), Democratic Alliance (DA) and Freedom Front Plus (FF+) announced a coalition agreement, with the CFRA getting the position of mayor, and the FF+ deputy mayor.

In the election of 4 November 2026, no party won a majority. The Democratic Alliance won the largest number of seats.

Party	Ward			List			Total seats
Party	Votes	%	Seats	Votes	%	Seats	Total seats
Democratic Alliance	4,536	30.61	3	4,587	31.40	1	4
African National Congress	3,282	22.15	1	3,306	22.63	2	3
Patriotic Alliance	2,299	15.51	0	2,386	16.34	2	2
Cederberg First Residents Association	2,233	15.07	2	2,172	14.87	0	2
Independent candidates	292	1.97	0				0
10 other parties	2,177	14.69	0	2,155	14.75	0	0
Total	14,819	100.00	6	14,606	100.00	5	11
Valid votes	14,819	99.14		14,606	98.78		
Invalid/blank votes	128	0.86		180	1.22		
Total votes	14,947	100.00		14,786	100.00		
Registered voters/turnout	29,719	50.29		29,719	49.75		
