= Twee =

Twee (Dutch for two) may refer to:

- Twee pop, a music genre
- Twee River, a river that forms the Groot River (Western Cape), South Africa

== See also ==
- Twi, a dialect of the Akan language spoken in southern and central Ghana
