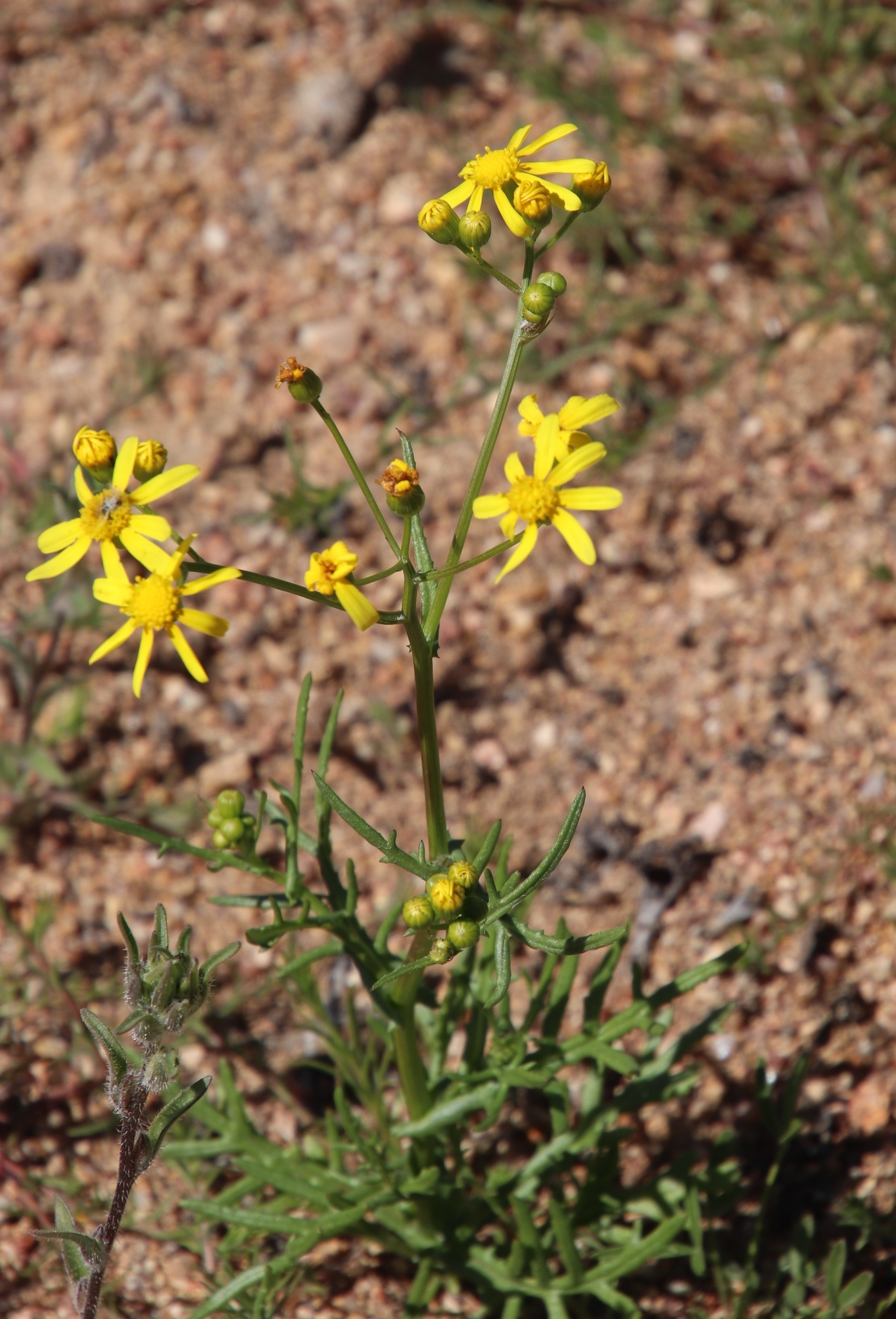

Scientific classification
- Kingdom: Plantae
- Clade: Tracheophytes
- Clade: Angiosperms
- Clade: Eudicots
- Clade: Asterids
- Order: Asterales
- Family: Asteraceae
- Genus: Senecio
- Species: S. abruptus

Binomial name
- Senecio abruptus Thunb.

Synonyms
- Senecio heteroclinius DC.; Senecio heterophyllus Thunb.

= Senecio abruptus =

Species of plant

Senecio abruptus, or the yellow starvation ragwort, is a species of plant that is endemic to the Cape Provinces of South Africa.

== Description ==
This annual grows up to 60 cm (2.0 ft) tall. The leaves range from an elongated oval to toothed to having slightly feathery margins. The base of each leaf may be lobed. The small yellow flowers grow in disc shaped flowerheads. They are present between July and November.

== Distribution and habitat ==
This plant grows on stony slopes between the Cape Peninsula and Clanwilliam in South Africa.
