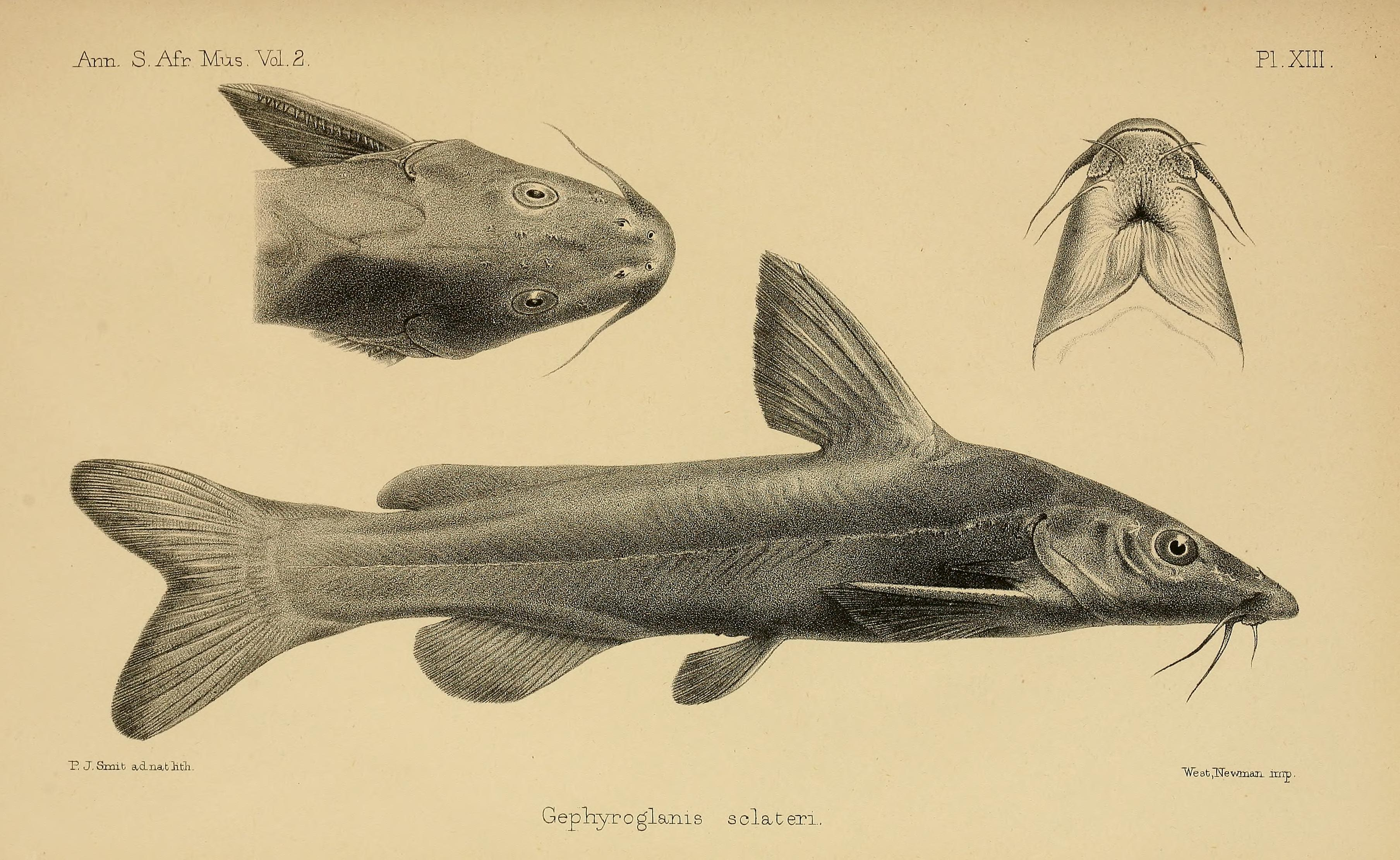
- Drawing of Austroglanis sclateri

Conservation status
- Least Concern (IUCN 3.1)

Scientific classification
- Kingdom: Animalia
- Phylum: Chordata
- Class: Actinopterygii
- Order: Siluriformes
- Family: Austroglanididae
- Genus: Austroglanis
- Species: A. sclateri

Binomial name
- Austroglanis sclateri (Boulenger, 1901)

Synonyms
- Gephyroglanis sclateri Boulanger, 1901

= Rock-catfish =

Species of ray-finned fish

The rock-catfish (Austroglanis sclateri) is a species of catfish in the family Austroglanididae. This freshwater fish is found in the Vaal River in South Africa. It is also found in Lesotho and Namibia.

== Size ==
This species reaches a maximum length of 300 millimetres (12 in) standard length and a weight of 1 kilogram (2.2 lb).

== Distribution ==
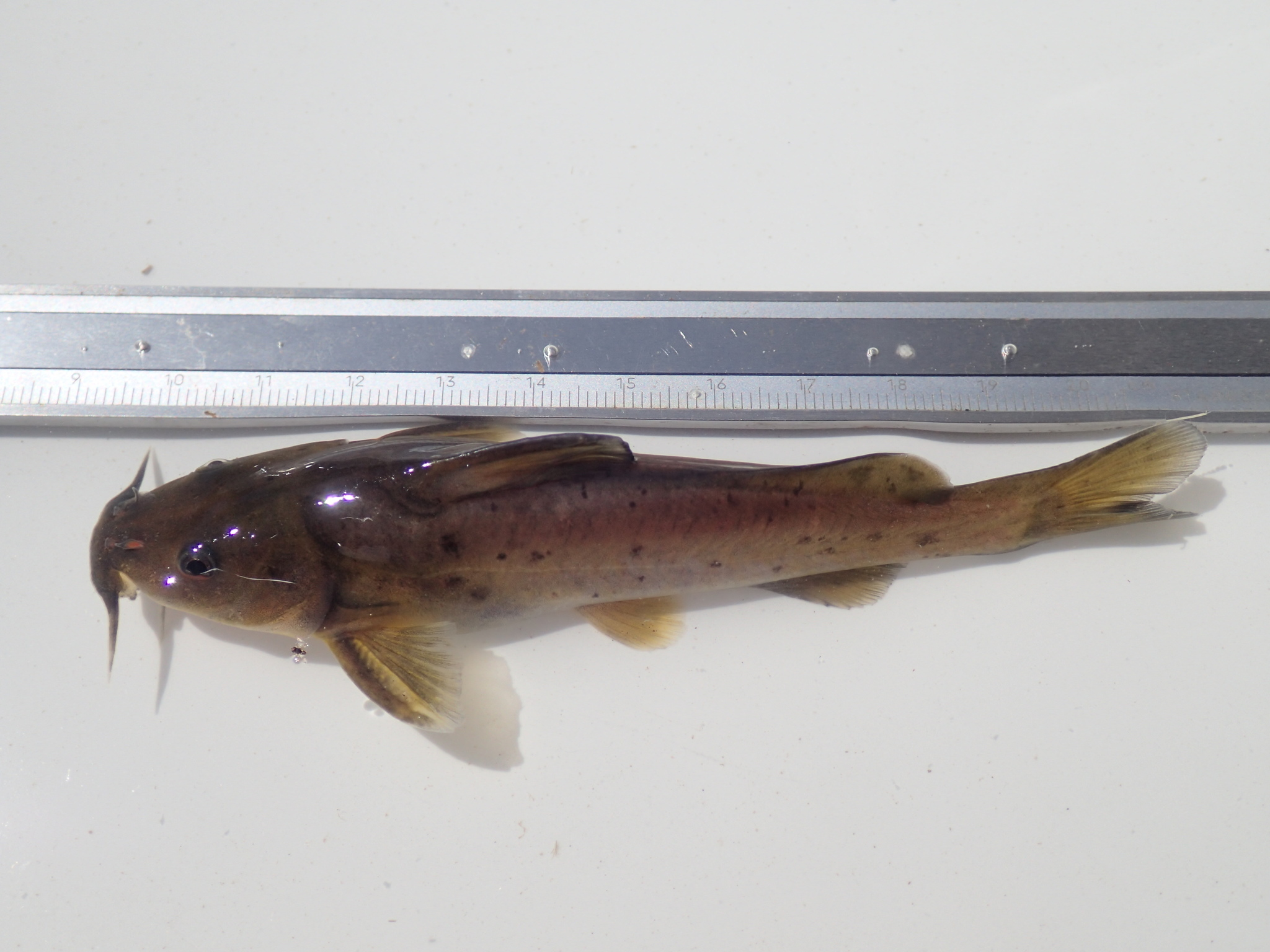
Austroglanis sclateri

It is found in the Orange-Vaal system in South Africa and is also found in Lesotho and Namibia.

== Behavior ==
A. sclateri occurs in rocky habitats in flowing water, favoring rapids. It feeds on invertebrates, especially insects, taken from rock surfaces; larger specimens also take small fish. It is rarely caught by anglers.
