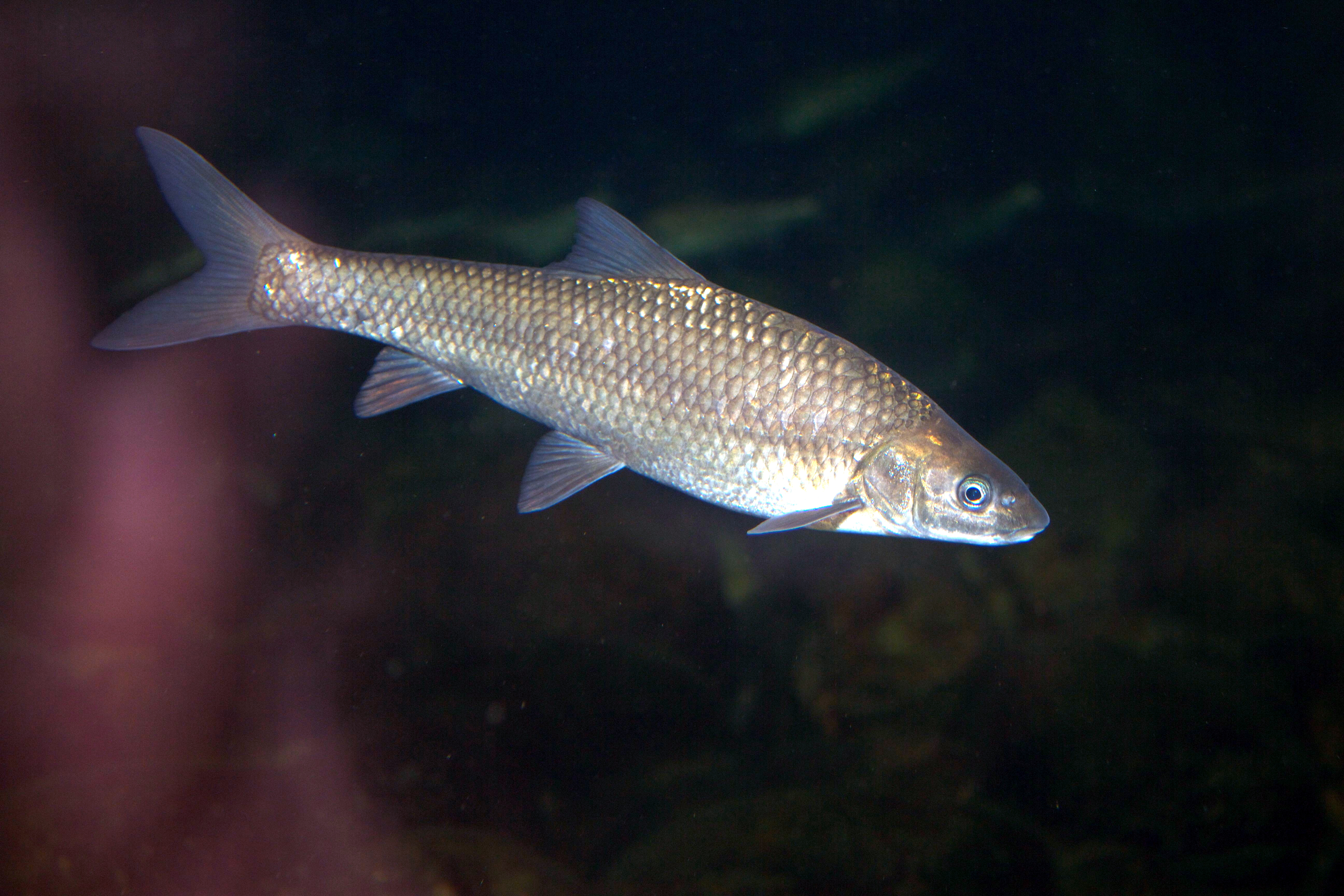

Conservation status
- Endangered (IUCN 3.1)

Scientific classification
- Kingdom: Animalia
- Phylum: Chordata
- Class: Actinopterygii
- Order: Cypriniformes
- Family: Cyprinidae
- Subfamily: Smiliogastrinae
- Genus: Cheilobarbus
- Species: C. capensis

Binomial name
- Cheilobarbus capensis (Smith, 1841)

Synonyms
- Barbus andrewi Barnard, 1937; Barbus capensis Smith, 1841; Pseudobarbus andrewi (Barnard, 1937); Pseudobarbus capensis (Smith, 1841)

= Cape whitefish =

Species of fish

The Cape whitefish or Berg-Breede River whitefish (Cheilobarbus capensis) is a ray-finned fish species in the family Cyprinidae. It was formerly placed with the South African redfins in Pseudobarbus. It is tetraploid. Its closest living relative is the sawfin (C. serra).

== Distribution and ecology ==
The Cape whitefish is endemic to the Western Cape Province of South Africa, where it occurs in the Breede River's Brandvlei Dam and Sanddrift Dam, as well as the Hex River. Formerly, it was also found in and around the Berg River, but it seems to have disappeared from there. Populations have also been transplanted to farm water catchments, but it is not well known if these have thrived or failed.

It inhabits the deeper stretches of rivers with rocky shores or riparian trees. While young fish are common in riffles, adults are not rheophilic and will thrive in slow-moving water. Young fish are carnivores, eating zooplankton and small aquatic invertebrates. Adults have more omnivorous diets that consist of benthic invertebrates and algae. The breeding season is in late spring (about October) when the water has warmed to above 20 °C (68 °F). Schools of adults form to migrate to riffles with over one meter/yard deep water and spawn in the late hours of morning. A good-sized adult female produces about 100,000 eggs. In dams, it will use rocky and gravelly substrate in the shallows as a spawning place. The species is long-lived.

== Status and conservation ==
This Cape whitefish is considered Endangered by the IUCN as it has declined much in recent decades. The main threat is the introduced smallmouth bass (Micropterus dolomieu), which has killed off the stocks of the fish in the Berg River watershed by eating juveniles. In Brandvlei Dam, where the barb's population is most healthy, the African catfish (Clarias gariepinus) is spreading; its impact will need to be assessed. The common carp (Cyprinus carpio) and Mozambique tilapia (Oreochromis mossambicus), introduced for aquaculture, are competing with the Cape whitefish for food. Water pollution is also a problem.

It is also listed as endangered by the Nature Conservation Ordinance of Western Cape Province. For the time being, it may not be killed and only caught for supervised transfer trials to other habitats. An initiative is aimed at restoring the stocks, so this large fish can be used in fishing and maybe aquaculture as an alternative to the harmful introduced species.

There are many reasons as to why the population of the Cape whitefish have recently been declining, with human-related activity being one of them. A severe flood in 2008 as well as invasions of other predatory fish species are a likely cause of the decline as well. In order to prevent further decline, there are conservation actions in place such as managing non-native fish invasions as well as lessening the agricultural impact on aquatic habitat.
