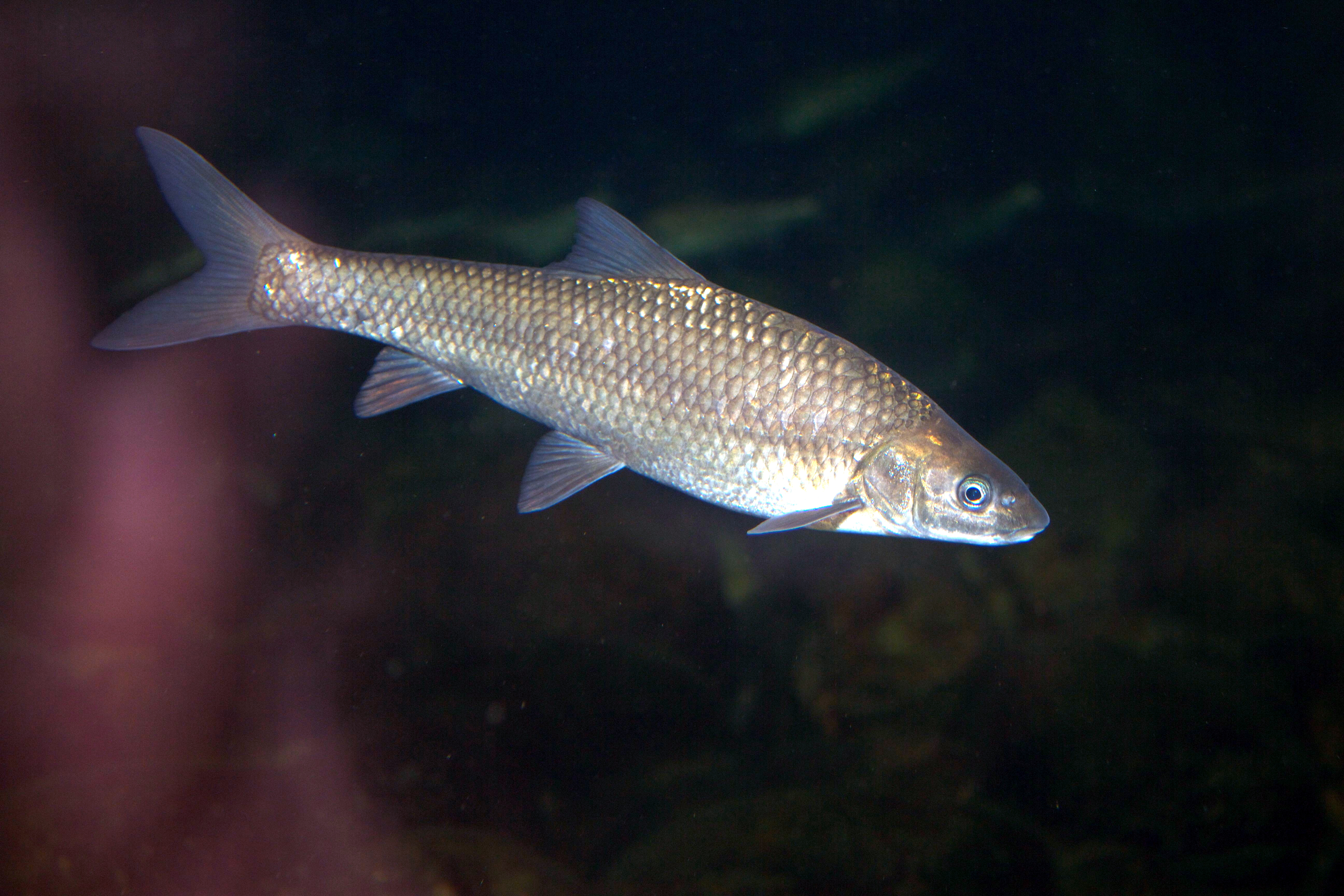
- Cape whitefish (Cheilobarbus capensis) at the Two Oceans Aquarium

Scientific classification
- Kingdom: Animalia
- Phylum: Chordata
- Class: Actinopterygii
- Order: Cypriniformes
- Family: Cyprinidae
- Subfamily: Smiliogastrinae
- Genus: Cheilobarbus; A. Smith, 1841

Type species
- Barbus (Cheilobarbus) capensis A. Smith, 1841

Species
- 2 species, see text

= Cheilobarbus =

Genus of fishes

Cheilobarbus, commonly known as sawfins, is a small genus of freshwater ray-finned fishes belonging to the family Cyprinidae, which includes the carps, barbs and related fishes. The fishes in this genus are endemic to the Western Cape of South Africa.

== Taxonomy ==
Cheilobarbus was first proposed as a taxon, a monotypic subgenus of the genus Barbus, by the Scottish military surgeon and zoologist Andrew Smith in 1841 when he described Barbus (Cheilobarbus) capensis from the Olifants River on the western coast of South Africa. This genus is included in the subfamily Smiliogastrinae within the family Cyprinidae.

== Etymology ==
Cheilobarbus combines cheilos, meaning "lip", with the genus name Barbus. Smith described B. capensis as having "full and firm" lips.

== Species ==
Cheilobarbus contains the following species:

- Cheilobarbus capensis (A. Smith, 1841) (Cape whitefish)
- Cheilobarbus serra (W. K. H. Peters, 1864) (Sawfin)

Both species are tetraploid, like Pseudobarbus redfins, from which they were separated.

== Characteristics ==
Cheilobarbus fishes are among the largest of the South African barb species and reach standard lengths greater than 15 cm (5.9 in). They have a relatively longer snout than related genera, with an elongated lacrimal bone. They have an inferior mouth which has large, firm lips and there are two pairs of barbels. Adults show a reddening on the crown and on a scale row above the pectoral fins during the spawning season. The dorsal fin is over or a little to the rear of the pelvic fins. The last unbranched dorsal fin ray is slightly or clearly serrated along its posterior margin, and this is followed by eight branched rays. There are three unbranched and five or six branched fin rays in the anal fin.

== Distribution and habitat ==
Cheilobarbus fishes are endemic to the Western Cape. The Cape whitefish is found in the Breede and Berg drainages, and the sawfin is endemic to the Olifants River system. These fishes prefer deeper parts of large rivers as adults, including impoundments. Cheilobarbus species reproduce in the summer and form large groups that spawn together on rocky bottoms.
