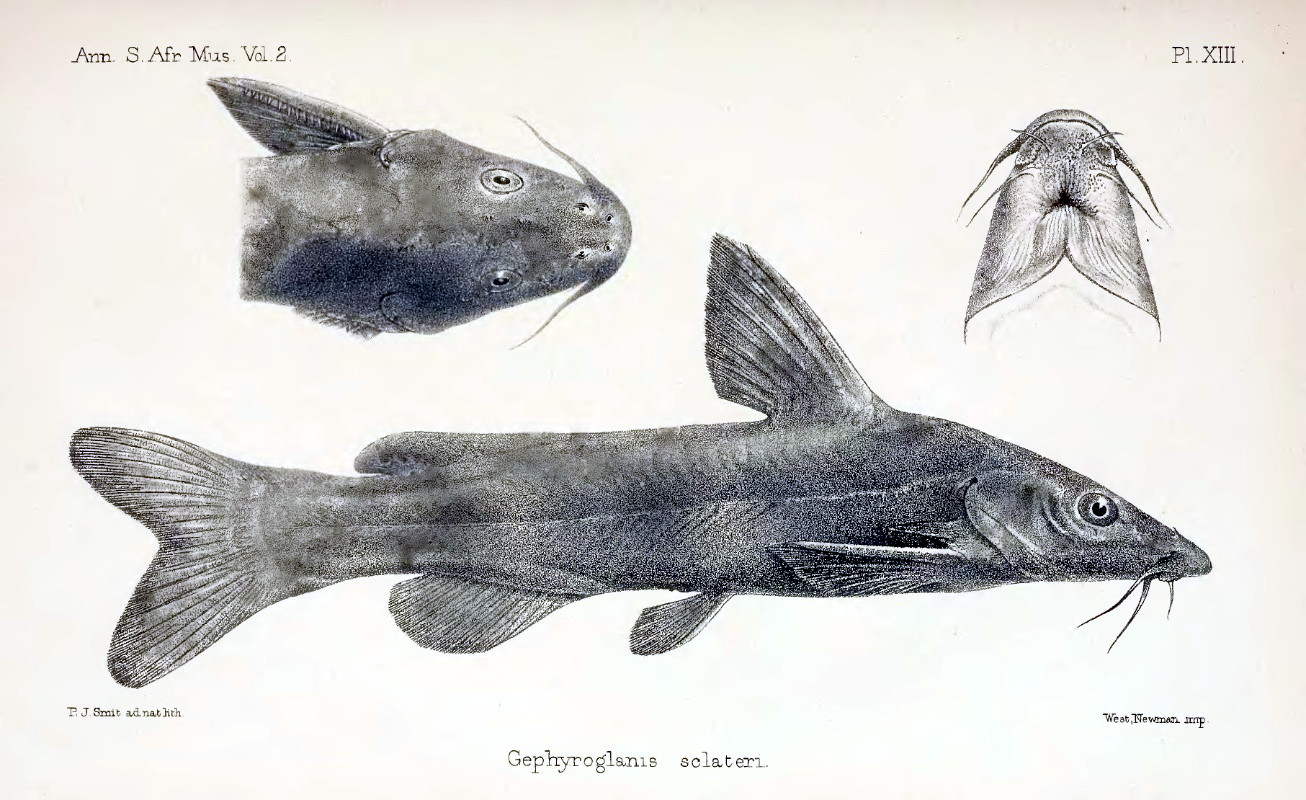
- Austroglanis sclateri

Scientific classification
- Kingdom: Animalia
- Phylum: Chordata
- Class: Actinopterygii
- Order: Siluriformes
- Family: Austroglanididae; T. P. Mo, 1991
- Genus: Austroglanis; P. H. Skelton, Risch & De Vos, 1984

Type species
- Gephyroglanis sclateri Boulenger 1901

= Austroglanis =

Genus of fishes

Austroglanis is the only genus in the catfish family Austroglanididae. This family was split off from the Bagridae catfish family. All three species of catfishes in the family Austroglanididae are endemic to southern Africa (South Africa and Namibia), and two species are threatened.

These fish have three pairs of barbels (they lack nasal barbels). They have strong dorsal and pectoral fin spines. The adipose fin is small.

== Species ==
There are currently three described species in this genus:

- Austroglanis barnardi (P. H. Skelton, 1981) (Barnard's rock-catfish)
- Austroglanis gilli (Barnard, 1943) (Clanwilliam catfish)
- Austroglanis sclateri (Boulenger, 1901) (Rock-catfish)
