= Papendorp =

- Location within Western Cape Location within South Africa
- Coordinates: 31°42′S 18°13′E
- Country: South Africa
- Province: Western Cape
- District: West Coast
- Municipality: Matzikama
- Time zone: UTC+2 (SAST)

Papendorp is a small village on the Atlantic Ocean coastline of Western Cape Province, South Africa. This village resides under Matzikama Local Municipality.

Papendorp is located at the mouth of the Olifants River and at high tide it is possible to navigate to Lutzville on a flat-bottomed boat, about 30 km upstream. Ebenhaezer, a Rhenish mission station established in 1831 is located a few kilometers further inland, on the road between Papendorp and Lutzville. There are salt pans in the area that are exploited commercially. Strandfontein is located a few kilometers south down the coast.
