= Clanwilliam redfin =

Conservation status
- Near Threatened (IUCN 3.1)

Scientific classification
- Kingdom: Animalia
- Phylum: Chordata
- Class: Actinopterygii
- Order: Cypriniformes
- Family: Cyprinidae
- Subfamily: Smiliogastrinae
- Genus: Sedercypris
- Species: S. calidus

Binomial name
- Sedercypris calidus Barnard, 1938

Synonyms
- Barbus calidus Pseudobarbus calidus

Species of fish

The Clanwilliam redfin (Sedercypris calidus), is a ray-finned fish species in the family Cyprinidae. It was formerly placed with the South African redfins in Pseudobarbus. It is tetraploid. Its closest living relative is the Twee River redfin (S. erubescens).

== Distribution and ecology ==
It is endemic to the Western Cape Province of South Africa, where it occurs in the upper Olifants River and its tributaries – the Biedou, Boontjies, Boskloof, Breekkrans, Driehoeks, Dwars, Eselbank, Jan Dissels, Matijes, Noordhoeks, Oudste, Ratels, Rondegat, Thee and Tra Tra Rivers – near Clanwilliam and Keerom.

It inhabits the pools and shallower water in larger clear and slightly acidic mountain streams. They are insectivores, eating mainly small mayflies (Baetidae), non-biting midges (Chironomidae) and ants (Formicidae). The breeding season is lengthy and lasts most of the summer, from November to January. Schools of adults form to migrate to shallow pools with slow-moving water and spawn between rocks and boulders, depositing the eggs in crevices between these.

== Status and conservation ==
This species is considered Near Threatened by the IUCN, mainly due to the adverse impact of the introduced smallmouth bass (Micropterus dolomieu) on its population. The most drastic declines have been in the past, and though the species is still declining it is not doing so at an alarming rate; wherever the bass has not become established yet it is actually rather plentiful. Bluegills (Lepomis macrochirus) and rainbow trouts (Oncorhynchus mykiss) are other introduced species that are significant as predators of younger Clanwilliam redfins. Banded Tilapia (Tilapia sparrmanii) is yet another introduced fish that has an adverse effect on the stocks of S. calidus, in its case due to competition for food. The other main threat is water pollution and other forms of unsustainable water use. Particularly the conversion of riparian lands for citrus plantations, with the resultant uninhibited runoff of pesticides and fertilizers, is considered very harmful.

The Clanwilliam redfin occurs in the Cederberg Wilderness Area and the Matjies River Nature Reserve, where it is at least safe from habitat destruction. It is listed as Endangered by the Nature Conservation Ordinance of Western Cape Province. For the time being, it may not be killed or caught. The species is on display in public aquaria of Cape Town, Clanwilliam and Jonkershoek to educate the public on its conservation needs.
