= ǃKora Wars =

Nineteenth-century conflict in South Africa

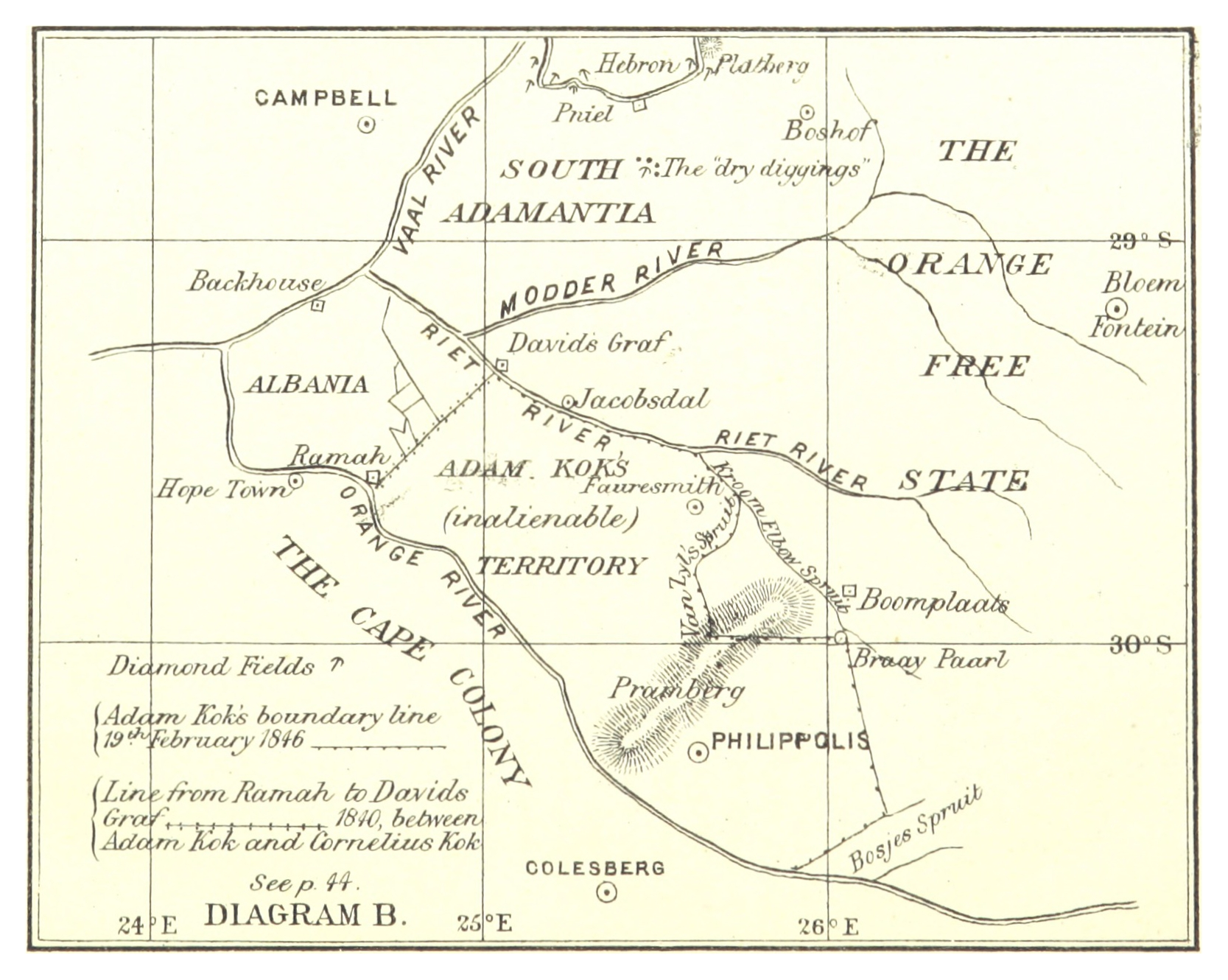
A map from 1873 detailing the two main territories separated by the Orange River. The Orange Free State had become a newly formed Boer sovereign republic.

The ǃKora Wars was a period of raiding by the ǃKora people and subsequent military action by the Boer authorities. The mid-nineteenth century experienced migration as a result of the protracted frontier wars that forced the movement of certain indigenous groups further north of the Cape Colony. These included the Khoisan, the Basters (a derogatory term for people of mixed European and Khoi heritage) and the ǃKora, a people whom the colonial authorities considered more of a bandit community. The ǃKora were known to loot communities living around the lower to middle Orange River. The raids increased in volume and intensity during the mid eighteen hundreds. This forced the authorities to launch a series of expeditions aimed at countering the raids. The ǃKora were finally stopped in 1879, but their intimate knowledge of the Gariep (Orange River) rendered them the most significant threat to settler colonies outside of the Bantu nations at the time.

== Origins ==
Recent studies has come to consider the ǃKora people as more of a loose group of communities. Initially they consisted of two groupings, the Little Korana and the Great Korana. Movement and divisions would come to separate them into even smaller groups. Some of these differences were caused by quarrels over grazing rights, livestock and water sources. The ǃIkora were a nomadic people, who were not bound to any one place for long stretches of time, even then they were considered to be semi-pastoral communities. Many of them shunned life in the Cape Colony because it meant living a life of servitude and hard labour. Instead, they looked northwards for a free life. Their ability to use guns and ride horses effectively were skills adopted under colonial life and these were skills that would prove beneficial to their cause. This made them highly adept at raiding livestock belonging to colonial settler communities.

== Life along the Gariep ==
Many groups within the ǃKora community lived all along the expansive Orange River. They became highly knowledgeable of it and used its islands and riverbanks to their advantage. During this time the banks of the Orange were dense with foliage and reeds. On the river itself were numerous islands dotted about, which revealed themselves when water levels were low. The combination of tall reeds and the islands provided an advantage for the ǃKora, because they were able to ambush their targets much easier.

== The legend of Stuurman ==
In the 1830s the sparse settler communities along the Orange River region were able to counter some of the raids from the ǃKora people; however, a highly skilled and organised group of ǃKora marauders began to emerge. A former slave known as Stuurman who belonged to a family in Griqualand led this group. Little is recorded on his ancestry. With a growing number of disgruntled ǃKora under his leadership, he gained notoriety in 1832 when he and his followers stole livestock on cattle farms south of the Orange River. It is reported that they stole 5 wagons, 3000 sheep, 70 horses and 200 head of cattle. Over the next two years they proceeded to loot the border towns of Clanwilliam, Beaufort West and Graaf Reinet. These were areas leading out of the Cape Colony; policing presence in these areas was scattered. Stuurman also launched attacks on the Tswana of Griqualand. Stuurman was however shot and killed by a white cattle farmer.

== Outlaws ==
The 1860s in Southern Africa brought about a serious drought, which had a profound impact on the movement of the Bantu communities; the trekboers who were beginning to concentrate on a life in the interior; and the Khoi and San communities that were being forced further north by the latter's migration. The communities around the Orange River were beginning to grow in their numbers, a reality that some ǃKora leaders took full advantage of. The most notorious leaders of this time were Klaas Springbokke of the Springbokke group, Klaas Lukas of the Cat Korana group, with Cupido Pofadder occupying the more westerly region of the Orange River. These fractured groups put a lot of roving Trekboers and Bastaard communities under pressure, with their cattle being a prime target. Some of ǃKora were also rumoured to have secured smuggling networks further in the interior that could supply them with arms. Jan Kivido and Piet Rooi formed a partnership and were the most consistent raiders.

== Conflict ==
The first recorded significant incident between the ǃKora people and the colonial government occurred in 1869, when a Griqua and Scottish trader were robbed along the southern bank of the Orange River. Piet Rooi, the leader of another nomadic ǃKora group, was held responsible for the robbery, and as punishment was lashed and committed to three months hard labour. He was subsequently released on account of insufficient evidence against him. The treatment he received did not sit well with many of the ǃIkora raiders, and this spurred them into increased levels of livestock pillaging that belonged to the settlers throughout the region.

A three hundred-man strong commando under Special Magistrate Maxmillian Jackson was deployed to try and deal with Rooi and Kivido's activities, and although Kivido was killed in the insurgence, the attack was considered a failure as the commando struggled to navigate the islands due to limited understanding of the river's layout. As a result, the efforts to deter the ǃKora from any more raids were increased. The authorities bribed two leaders of the most powerful groups, Lukas and Cupido Pofadder. They were given protection in exchange for information on the other marauding groups. Lukas orchestrated the recapture of Rooi and some of his cohorts, and handed them over to the Special Magistrate, and about 400 men were sentenced to Robben Island.

== Aftermath ==
Those who were able to evade capture retreated into the Kalahari Desert. Some among the captured ǃKora were forced back into manual labour on white farms, while others succumbed to smallpox. In effect, the entire ǃKora community was destroyed, and some of their prominent lead raiders spent decades behind bars. By the time they were released, they were too old and frail to resume their activities, and the ǃKora people were too scattered to mobilise once more.

== See also ==
- Mfecane
- Hendrik Witbooi
