= Citrusdal =

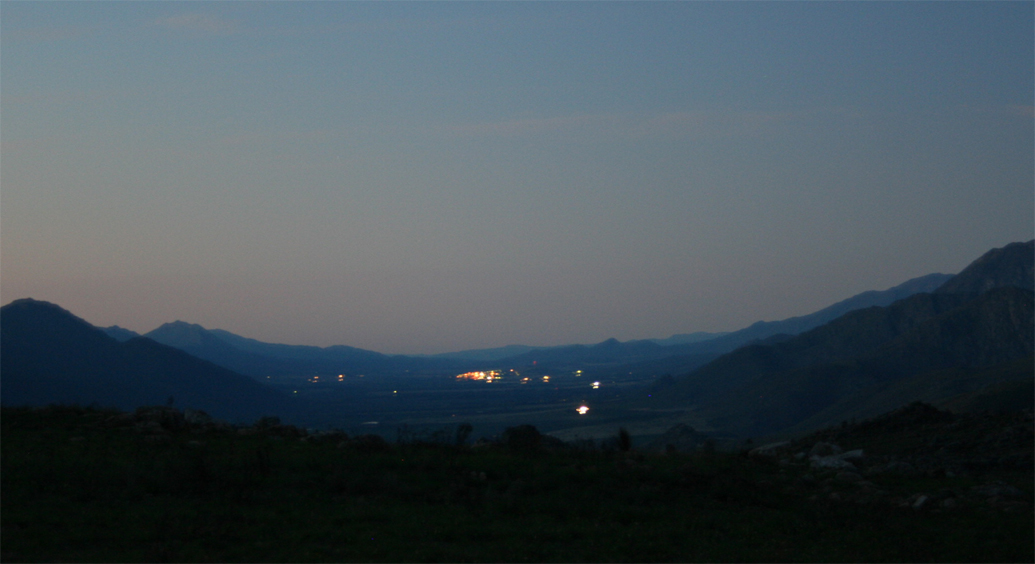
- View of Citrusdal and surrounding mountains at night

- Location within Western Cape Location within South Africa
- Coordinates: 32°35′22″S 19°00′53″E
- Country: South Africa
- Province: Western Cape
- District: West Coast
- Municipality: Cederberg
- Established: 1916

Area
  - Total: 4.70 km^{2} (1.81 sq mi)

Population (2011)
  - Total: 7,177
  - Density: 1,530/km^{2} (3,950/sq mi)

Racial makeup (2011)
  - Black African: 15.6%
  - Coloured: 69.0%
  - Indian/Asian: 0.2%
  - White: 14.5%
  - Other: 0.7%

First languages (2011)
  - Afrikaans: 87.5%
  - Xhosa: 5.9%
  - Sotho: 2.4%
  - English: 1.9%
  - Other: 2.3%
- Time zone: UTC+2 (SAST)
- Postal code (street): 7340
- PO box: 7340
- Area code: 022

Citrusdal is a town of 7,177 as of 2011 people in the Olifants River Valley in the Western Cape province of South Africa. It is situated at the base of the Cederberg mountains about 160 kilometres (100 mi) north of Cape Town. Agriculture in the area is dominated by citrus fruit farming, hence the town's name. Natural hot water springs occur in the area. It also has a high school named Cederberg Academy and a private school and two other primary schools and lots of creches.

== History ==
Citrusdal was established in 1916 by the Nederduits Gereformeerde Kerk to serve the upper Olifants River valley. The church bought a portion of Middelpost farm, on which a township was laid out. A town council was established in 1957.

== Economy ==
=== Agriculture ===
The Olifants River valley is one of South Africa's major citrus-producing areas. The region's farms grow primarily oranges, lemons and naartjies (mandarin oranges), supported by irrigation from the Olifants River and the Clanwilliam Dam.

Rooibos tea (Aspalathus linearis) is cultivated in the surrounding Cederberg mountains. The plant grows only in the Cederberg region and the area around Citrusdal is one of its primary production zones. Producers such as Carmién Tea operate processing facilities on farms in the Citrusdal valley.

Wine production has also emerged in the Citrusdal Mountain sub-region, where vineyards are planted at elevations between 500 and 700 metres.

=== Tourism ===
Citrusdal serves as a gateway to the Cederberg Wilderness Area, a 71,000 ha (180,000 acres) protected area proclaimed in 1973. The wilderness area forms part of the Cape Floristic Region World Heritage Site and is known for its sandstone rock formations, including the Maltese Cross and the Wolfberg Arch, as well as San rock art dating back several thousand years. It is popular for hiking, rock climbing and mountain biking.

The Baths, a hot springs resort located approximately 18 kilometres from town, draws on natural mineral springs that surface at approximately 43 °C. The valley also supports a growing agritourism sector, with working farms such as Waterfall Farm offering event venues and guest accommodation in the Cederberg foothills. Other attractions include the Citrusdal Museum, housed in a former stone church, and rooibos tea farm tours.

== Demographics ==
Population of Citrusdal
| Census | Population | Households |
|---|---|---|
| 2001 | 5,023 | 1,401 |
| 2011 | 7,177 | 1,919 |

In the 2011 Census, 69.0% of residents identified as Coloured, 15.6% as Black African, 14.5% as White, 0.2% as Indian/Asian, and 0.7% as other. Afrikaans is the first language of 87.5% of the population, followed by isiXhosa (5.9%), Sesotho (2.4%) and English (1.9%).

== Schools ==
The former Citrusdal High, which now continues as Olifantsvallei Primary, was dissolved in 2011. In its place a new high school, Cederberg Academy, was established in 2012. It is a small school situated in the Olifants River Valley, and has approximately 350 students.
