= Stream crossing =

This article covers crossings over small streams, not those over large rivers.

Stream crossings are the numerous instances where small perennial or intermittent streams are crossed by roads, pipelines, railways, or any other thing which might restrict the flow of the steam in ordinary or flood conditions. Crossings over any dry channel which might carry flood water is included. Any structure over or in a stream which results in limitations on the movement of fish or other ecological elements can be an issue.

== Types ==
In addition to bridges and culverts streams may be crossed by fords, floodways, low-water crossings or even stepping stones.

== Conveyance capacity ==
Often expressed in cubic feet per second (cfs), conveyance capacity is the amount of water a stream crossing structure will pass. The amount of water that can be predicted during flood conditions, such as a 100-year flood is one design consideration.

=== Failure to convey ===
If stream flow exceeds the capacity of the passage through the crossing or it is plugged by debris the crossing may be overtopped or the stream diverted down the road. This may result in substantial erosion as flood water cuts a gully on the side of road. Diversion occurs when a road slopes downward from a crossing and the height of the road exceeds the height of any outlet down the road. A sag (dip) in the road below the crossing may serve as a channel for over flow of excess water and prevent water from continuing down the road but is only practical on gentle slopes.

== Structural integrity ==
What happens when a heavy truck passes over, or flood water plugs an opening with debris or overtops the structure.

== Habitat continuity ==
Passage of wildlife, particularly fish such as salmon which spawn in streams, is a design consideration as is habitat continuity. In some jurisdictions, such as Massachusetts, these considerations may be incorporated into stream crossing regulations.

== See also ==
- Log bridges
