= Twee River redfin =

Conservation status
- Critically Endangered (IUCN 3.1)

Scientific classification
- Kingdom: Animalia
- Phylum: Chordata
- Class: Actinopterygii
- Order: Cypriniformes
- Family: Cyprinidae
- Subfamily: Smiliogastrinae
- Genus: Sedercypris
- Species: S. erubescens

Binomial name
- Sedercypris erubescens P. H. Skelton, 1974

Synonyms
- Barbus erubescens Pseudobarbus erubescens

Species of fish

The Twee River redfin (Sedercypris erubescens) or simply Twee redfin is a ray-finned fish species in the family Cyprinidae. It was formerly placed with the South African redfins in Pseudobarbus. It is tetraploid. Its closest living relative is the Clanwilliam redfin (S. calidus).

It is a smallish fish, just about 40 to 45 mm (1.6 to 1.8 in) long at sexual maturity and twice as long when fully grown. In the breeding season, males and females have the namesake red fins, but males (which are on average a bit larger) also have nuptial tubercles as is typical for cyprinids.

== Distribution and ecology ==
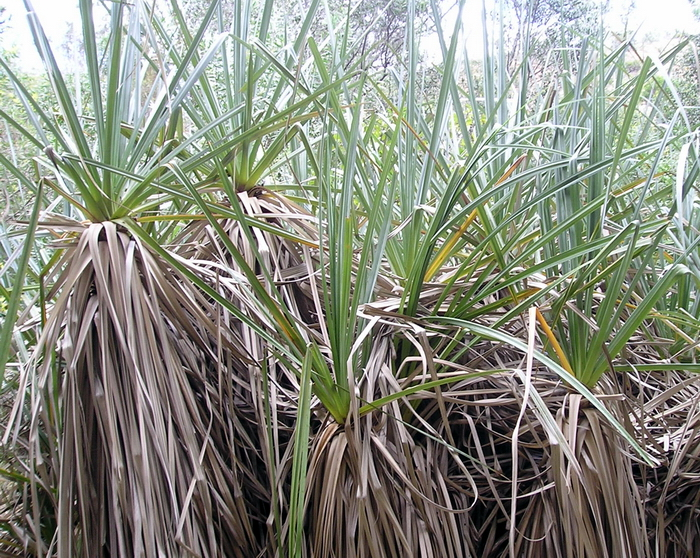
Palmiet (Prionium serratum) is important to ensure the survival of young Twee River redfins

It is endemic to the Western Cape Province of South Africa, where it occurs in the Twee River to just before its confluence with the Leeu River, and some tributaries of the former – namely the Heks, upper Middeldeur and upper Suurvlei Rivers. Some have been introduced to dams of farms, but this was too recently to determine whether they thrive or fail in this habitat.

Adults inhabit the deeper pools in rivers, sheltered by boulders or riparian trees. Young fish gather in schools near the water surface, associating with overhanging riparian growth, in particular palmiet (Prionium serratum, a Thurniaceae). The food is mainly benthic invertebrates; adults are also known to take other edible matter that drifts by, such as terrestrial insects that have fallen on the water surface. The breeding season extends from late spring to early summer (October to December). Eggs – up to 400 per female and breeding season – develop iteroparously, and spawning occurs after a batch of eggs has become fully developed; it is thus repeated several times during a breeding season until the entire batch of eggs has been laid. Sexual maturity is reached at two years of age, and the species can get up to 6 years old.

== Status and conservation ==
This species is considered Critically Endangered by the IUCN, as its population has plummeted since 1987 to a point where it is precariously close to extinction. Only an estimated 4,100 adults remain in the world, and gene flow between subpopulations has been cut off. The main threat is introduced carnivorous fishes. The Cape kurper (Sandelia capensis) is native to South Africa but does not occur naturally in the Twee River redfin's range; it has been introduced to the Suurvlei River, however. The kurper competes with the redfin for food and probably also eats young S. erubescens. It is the probable cause for the redfin's disappearance from the lower Suurvlei River. Competition with the Clanwilliam yellowfish (Labeobarbus capensis) – another South African native that was introduced to the redfin's range – has reduced S. erubescens stocks in the Twee River. Ironically, both introductions were well-meaning but misguided attempts to deal with problems caused by animals introduced from foreign countries, that failed to take into account the extremely high level of local endemism in Western Cape Province – and in the case of the Clanwilliam yellowfish were even supported by the Cape Department of Nature Conservation. The exotic fishes that are harmful to the Twee River redfin are the bluegill (Lepomis macrochirus) and the rainbow trout (Oncorhynchus mykiss), illegally released in its range in the 1990, probably by anglers. However, as these rivers have strong spring floods and high summer temperatures, neither bluegills nor trout fare as well there as they do elsewhere. Additional threats include habitat destruction by humans due to water pollution and overuse, and clearing of riparian for orchards. This is especially harmful, as it deprives the young fish (which are especially under pressure by the introduced species) of their shelter, and allows surface runoff carrying pesticides and fertilizers to pollute the rivers.

It is also listed as Endangered by the Nature Conservation Ordinance of Western Cape Province. It is illegal to kill Twee River redfins and for the time being, it may only be caught for supervised transfer trials to other habitat. Landowners are being educated about the uniqueness of the rivers' ecosystem and the threat posed by advancing cultivation right to the riverbank. As mentioned above, some translocations of this species to presumably secure areas have been started, and captive breeding studies are being undertaken at the University of Johannesburg. A conservation plan is under development by CapeNature and the South African Institute of Aquatic Biodiversity.
