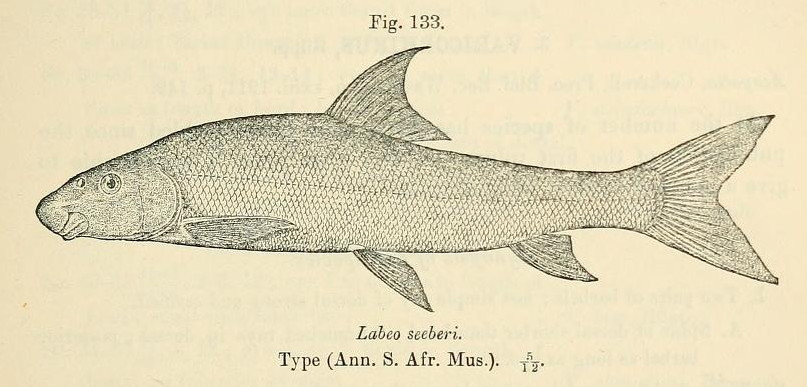

Conservation status
- Endangered (IUCN 3.1)

Scientific classification
- Kingdom: Animalia
- Phylum: Chordata
- Class: Actinopterygii
- Order: Cypriniformes
- Family: Cyprinidae
- Subfamily: Labeoninae
- Genus: Labeo
- Species: L. seeberi

Binomial name
- Labeo seeberi Gilchrist & W. W. Thompson, 1911
- IUCN range Extant (resident)

= Clanwilliam sandfish =

Species of fish

The Clanwilliam sandfish (Labeo seeberi) is a species of ray-finned fish in the family Cyprinidae. It is found in the Olifants River system in South Africa. It is one of South Africa's most threatened freshwater fish.
