= Clanwilliam Dam =

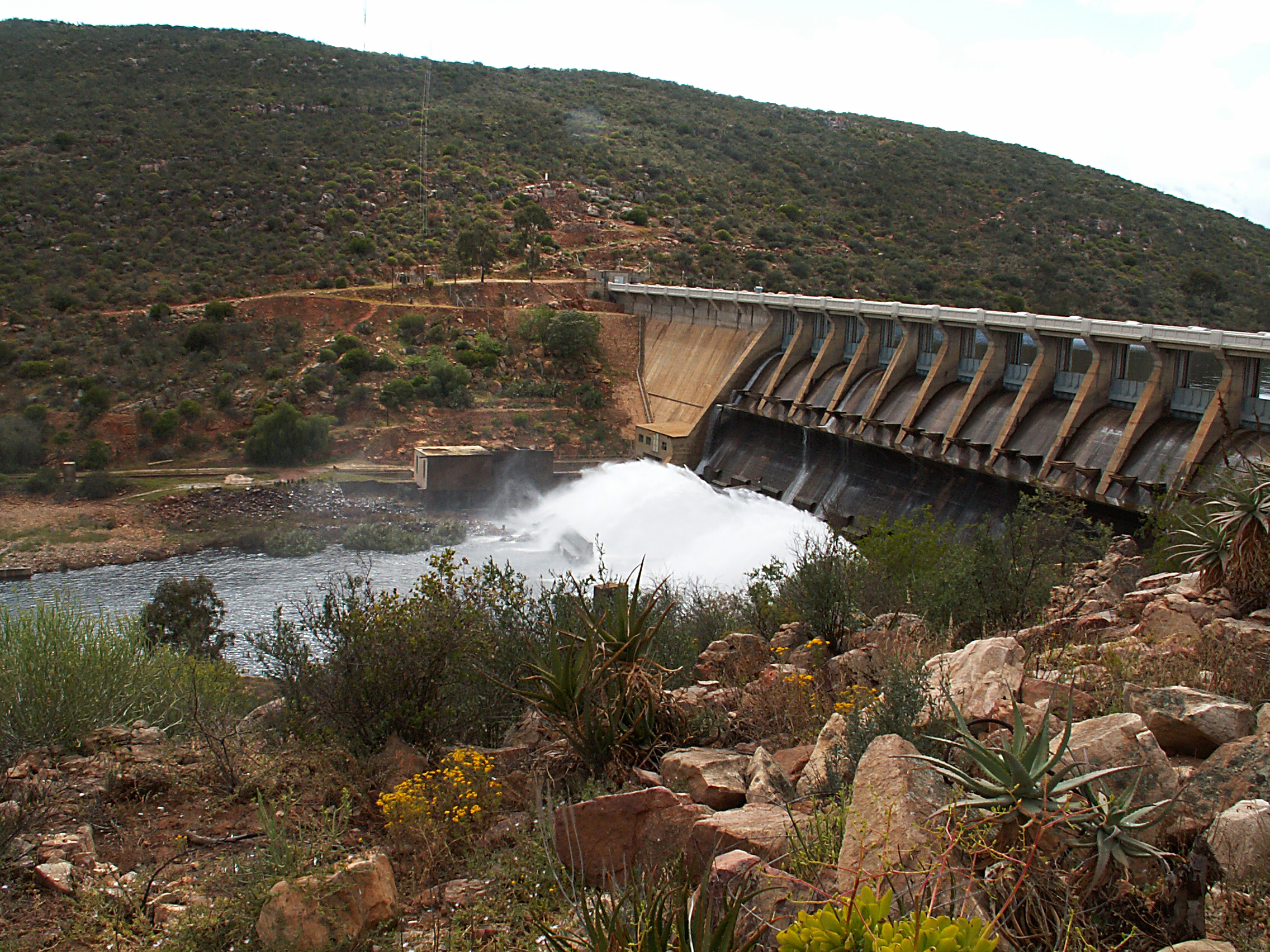

- Location in the Western Cape
- Interactive map of Clanwilliam Dam
- Official name: Clanwilliam Dam
- Country: South Africa
- Location: Western Cape
- Coordinates: 32°11′5″S 18°52′1″E
- Purpose: Irrigation
- Opening date: 1935 (wall raised in 1964)
- Owner: Department of Water Affairs

Dam and spillways
- Type of dam: Gravity dam
- Impounds: Olifants River
- Height: 43 m (141 ft)
- Length: 235 m (771 ft)

Reservoir
- Creates: Clanwilliam Dam Reservoir
- Total capacity: 121,800,000 m^{3} (4.30×10^{9} cu ft)
- Surface area: 1,124 ha (2,780 acres)

Clanwilliam Dam is a concrete gravity dam on the Olifants River, near Clanwilliam, Western Cape, South Africa. It was established in 1935, and the wall was raised to its current height of 43 metres (141 ft) in 1964. The main purpose of the dam is to provide irrigation water to the agricultural region downstream. It has a water storage capacity of 121,800,000 cubic metres (4.30×10^{9} cu ft).

The feasibility of raising the dam wall by another 15 metres has been investigated.

In 2015 an infrastructure development company has been appointed to do the supervision and contracts management of the project to raise the dam level. As of August 2015 the dam is planned to be raised by 13 meters, increasing its capacity by 70 million cubic metres of water.

== See also ==
- List of reservoirs and dams in South Africa
- List of rivers of South Africa
