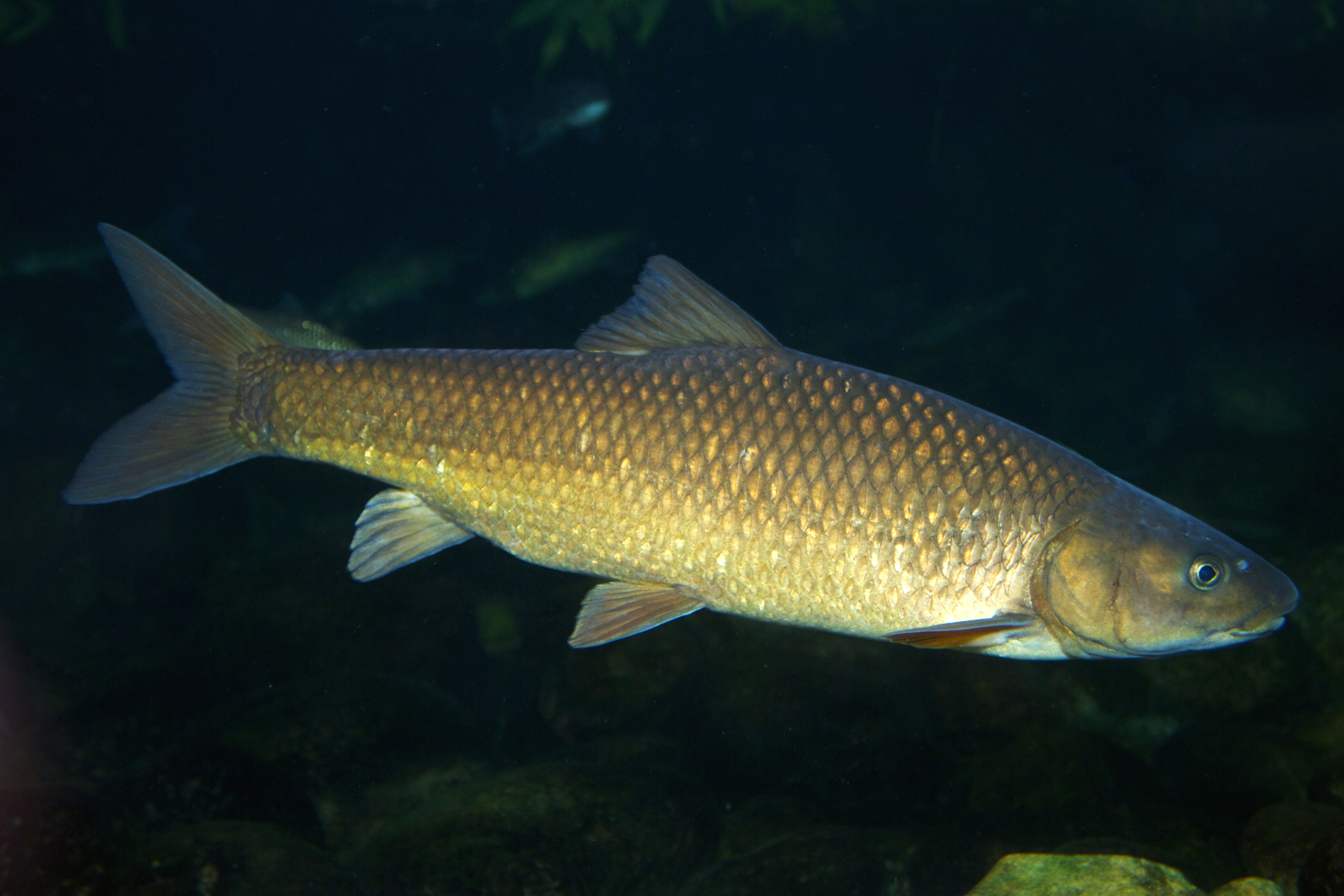

Conservation status
- Near Threatened (IUCN 3.1)

Scientific classification
- Kingdom: Animalia
- Phylum: Chordata
- Class: Actinopterygii
- Order: Cypriniformes
- Family: Cyprinidae
- Subfamily: Torinae
- Genus: Labeobarbus
- Species: L. seeberi

Binomial name
- Labeobarbus seeberi (Gilchrist & Thompson, 1913)
- IUCN range Extant (resident)

Synonyms
- Barbus seeberi Gilchrist & Thompson, 1913; Barbus capensis A. Smith, 1841; Labeobarbus capensis (A. Smith, 1841)

= Clanwilliam yellowfish =

Species of threatened fish endemic to South Africa

The Clanwilliam yellowfish (Labeobarbus seeberi) is a ray-finned fish species in the family Cyprinidae. It has long been placed in Barbus, the "wastebin genus" for barbs, by default; however, the species is increasingly being restored to related yellowfish genus Labeobarbus which seems a much more appropriate placement. It is hexaploid like the other yellowfish, among which it is more closely related to the smallscale yellowfish (L. polylepis) than to the largescale yellowfish (L. marequensis).

As its relatives, this is a large species. They are silvery with blotchy vertical barring on the sides when young, and become light brown all over when adult. Males turn golden-yellow in the breeding season, and the common name refers to this.

== Distribution and ecology ==
It is only found in the Western Cape Province of South Africa, where it is found in tributaries of the Olifants River, namely the Doring River, and the Biedou, Boskloof, Driehoeks, Groot, Jan Dissels, Kobee, Noordhoeks, Ratels, Rondegat, Thee and lower Twee Rivers in the Cederberg Mountains. It is not known whether it still occurs in the Olifants River itself in any numbers, and at least above Clanwilliam Dam and below Olifants Gorge it has apparently gone extinct.

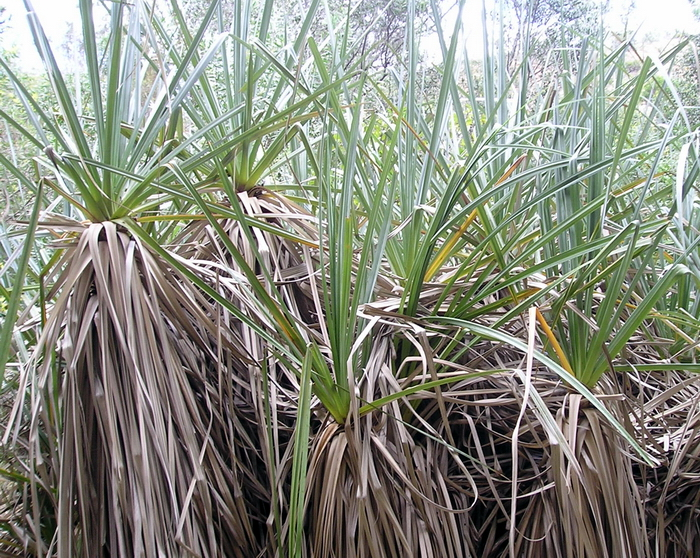
Palmiet (Prionium serratum) stands will aid Clanwilliam yellowfish to survive droughts

The Clanwilliam yellowfish is found in large and small rivers, but do not like slowly moving water. Young Clanwilliam yellowfish (below 4 cm/1.6 in long) are found in backwaters and shallow riffles. As they grow older they move out of the riffles into deeper water but even adults may still be found in relatively shallow parts of their habitat. The presence of deep pools and dense riparian stands of Palmiet (Prionium serratum, a Thurniaceae) that provide shadow will aid its survival if its home rivers run dry in hot summers. The young eat zooplankton and other small aquatic invertebrates. Adults are omnivores, feeding on larger invertebrates and algae. Their breeding season is prolonged and lasts from late spring to summer (about October to December), when the water is at least 20 °C (68 °F). During that time, adults repeatedly move in small groups into shallow riffles where the water is only a few decimetres deep, and deposit their non-sticky eggs there. The hatchlings initially move away from light and will hide between the substrate. In the absence of optimal breeding habitat (such as in dams), it will use any shallow water with generous rocks on the ground.

== Status and conservation ==
Its stocks have declined precariously between the 1940s and 1970s, after the smallmouth bass (Micropterus dolomieu) was introduced into its range. Though it is still found across a wide area and is plentiful in some places, the bass will eat young Clanwilliam yellowfish and thus easily lower their stocks to local extinction. Less important as predators of juvenile L. capensis are largemouth bass (M. salmoides), spotted bass (M. punctalatus) and bluegills (Lepomis macrochirus). Largemouth bass, bluegills and banded tilapia are also food competitors of young Clanwiliam yellowfish. Habitat destruction by canalisation and damming as well as water pollution by pesticides and fertilisers in the runoff of agricultural land are additional threats. Consequently, the species is listed as Near Threatened by the IUCN.

It is also listed as Endangered by the Western Cape Province Nature Conservation Ordinance, making it illegal to kill it, and to catch it except for supervised translocation and research projects. It occurs in the Cederberg Wilderness Area and in the Greater Cederberg Biodiversity Corridor; the latter was established in 2004 to assist local landowners in sustainable development. A research station dedicated to captive breeding was established by the Cape Department of Nature Conservation in 1976; the captive breeding program ran until the 1990s By that time, though water quality control problems had hampered the work throughout, the station had provided thousands of young L. seeberi public and private initiatives for establishing stocks. In a major gaffe, in the 1980s the species was established in the Twee River above some waterfalls which it could not naturally cross. In that region, the rare Twee River redfin (Pseudobarbus erubescens) had managed to survive; it was subsequently outcompeted by L. seeberi and disappeared from some of its remaining range, bringing it to the brink of extinction. The National Yellowfish Working Group was established in 1997 to follow up on the research station's program and to educate the public about the species, which may become of local or even commercial significance as food again if its stocks recover. Under the Cape Action for People and the Environment program launched in 1999, exotic invasive fishes are to be eradicated from the watercourses of the Cape Floristic Region. As regards the Clanwilliam yellowfin's former and current range, the eradication program has been slated to include the Krom and Rondegat Rivers.
