= Clanwilliam rock-catfish =

Conservation status
- Near Threatened (IUCN 3.1)

Scientific classification
- Kingdom: Animalia
- Phylum: Chordata
- Class: Actinopterygii
- Order: Siluriformes
- Family: Austroglanididae
- Genus: Austroglanis
- Species: A. gilli

Binomial name
- Austroglanis gilli (Barnard, 1943)

Synonyms
- Gephyroglanis gilli Barnard, 1943

Species of fish

The clanwilliam rock-catfish (Austroglanis gilli) is a species of catfish in the family Austroglanididae. It is endemic to South Africa.
