= Doring River =

River in the Western Cape Province, South Africa

- Location of the Doring/Oudrif River mouth

Location
- Country: South Africa
- Province: Western Cape

Physical characteristics
- Source
  - location: NE of Ceres
- Mouth: As Oudrif River
  - location: Confluence
  - coordinates: 31°52′26″S 18°38′23″E
  - elevation: 44 m (144 ft)

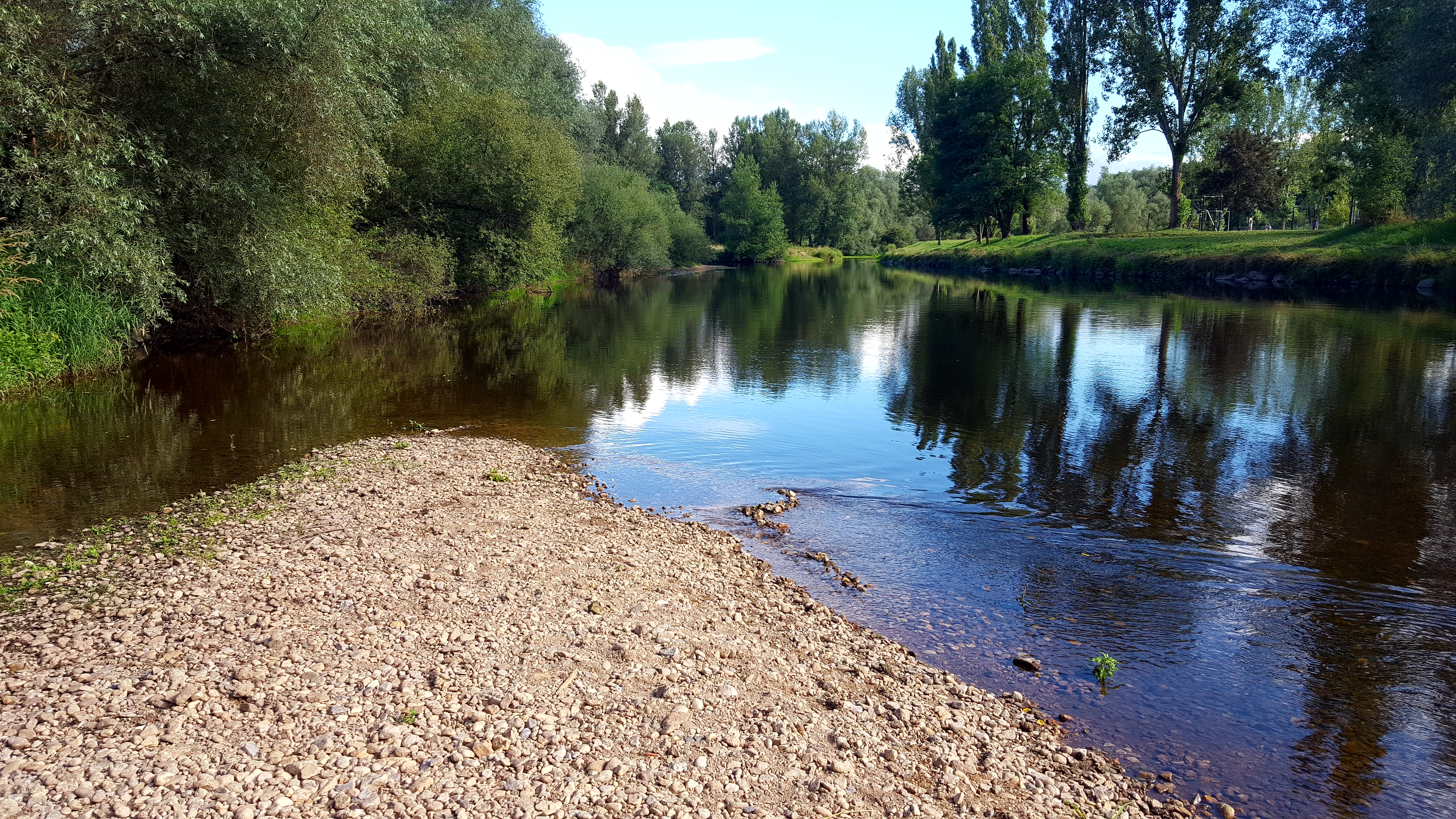

The Doring River (Afrikaans: Doringrivier) is a river in the Western Cape Province, South Africa. It is part of the Olifants/Doring River system.

The name 'Doring' is also applied to a stretch of the Sout River, another Olifants tributary, midway through its course.

== Course ==
The Doring originates northeast of Ceres and joins the Olifants River near the town of Klawer as the Oudrif River after the confluence with the Koebee River. Tributaries include the Tankwa River, Riet River, Wolf River and Brandewyn River.

== Ecology ==
The Clanwilliam Yellowfish (Labeobarbus capensis), a local endemic species classified as Vulnerable by the IUCN, is found in the Doring and other rivers of its basin.

== See also ==
- List of reservoirs and dams in South Africa
- List of rivers of South Africa
