= Olifants River (Western Cape) =

River in the Western Cape, South Africa

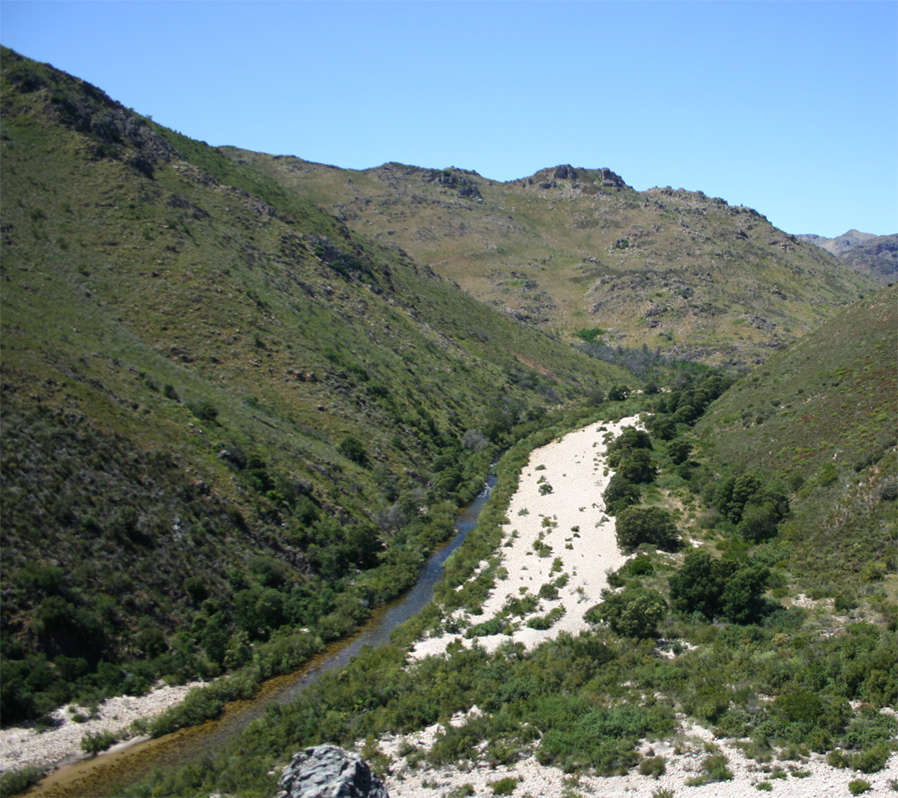
- A view of the Olifants River as it runs through the Winterhoek Mountain range a few kilometres upstream from Citrusdal

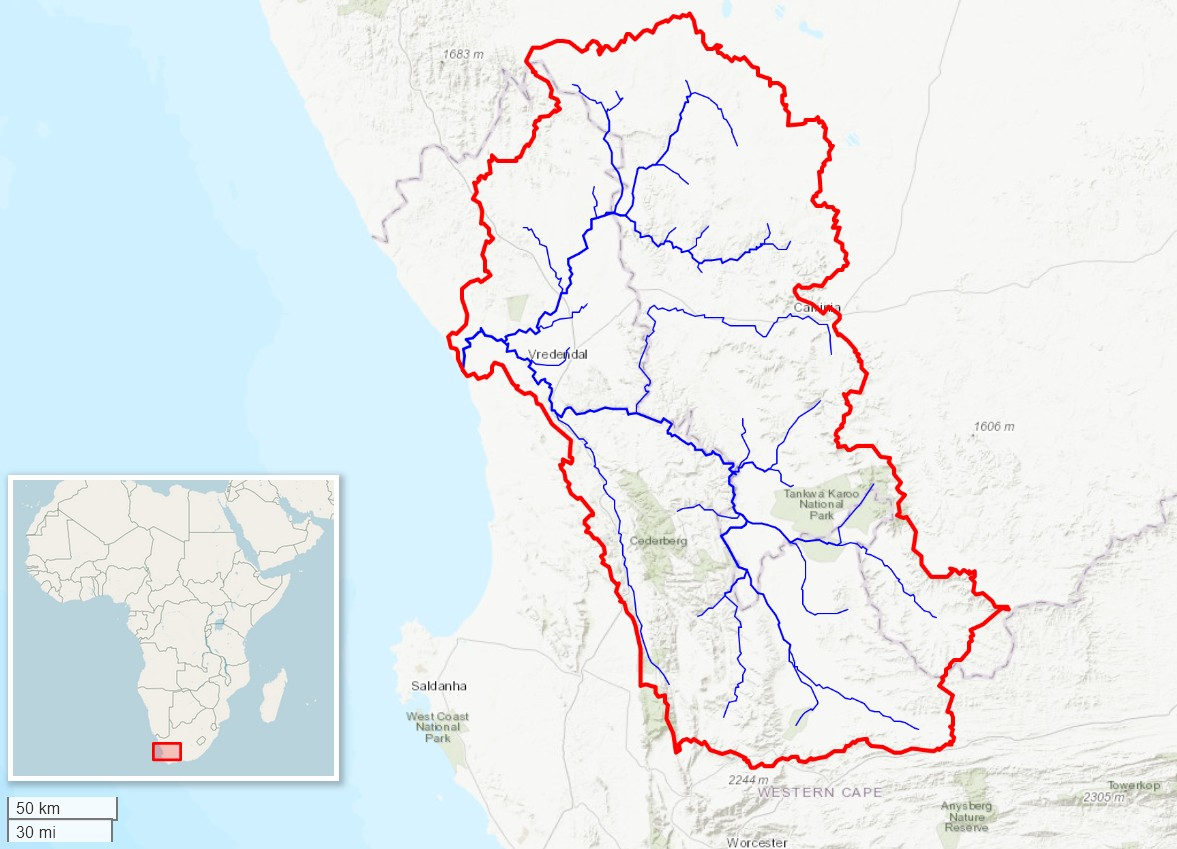
- Olifants River watershed (Interactive map)

Location
- Country: South Africa
- State: Western Cape Province

Physical characteristics
- Source: Winterhoek Mountains
- Mouth: Atlantic Ocean
  - location: near Papendorp
  - coordinates: 31°42′S 18°13′E
- Length: 265 km (165 mi)
- Basin size: 46,220 km^{2} (17,850 sq mi)

The Olifants River (Afrikaans: Olifantsrivier) is a river in the northwestern area of the Western Cape Province of South Africa. The upper and main catchment area of the Olifants river is around Ceres and the Cederberg mountains. The Clanwilliam and Bulshoek dams are located on the river and provide water for the towns and farms along the watercourse. The river is approximately 285 km long with a catchment area of 46,220 km^{2}. It flows into the Atlantic Ocean at Papendorp, 250 km north of Cape Town.

== Watershed ==
The Olifants River rises in the Winterhoek Mountains north of Ceres. The mainstem is about 265 km long. The river flows to the north-west through a deep, narrow valley that widens and flattens into a broad floodplain below Clanwilliam.

The river eventually drains into the Atlantic Ocean near Papendorp. At the mouth the Olifants river is split in two by an island that exhibits interesting rock formations.

=== Tributaries ===
Its main tributary is the Doring River, changing name as Melkboom/Oudrif before it joins the Olifants. The tributaries flowing from the east, such as the Thee River, Noordhoek River, Boontjies River, Rondegat River and the Jan Dissels River are typically perennial, except for the Sout River. Those flowing from the west, such as the Ratel River, Elandskloof River and the Seekoeivlei River are smaller and seasonal, not contributing much to the flow in the system.

== Dams ==
Dams in the catchment area of the Olifants River:

- Clanwilliam Dam, with a storage capacity of 127,000,000 cubic metres (4.5×10^{9} cu ft)
- Bulshoek Dam, with a storage capacity of 7,500,000 cubic metres (260,000,000 cu ft)

The major towns below the Olifants/Doring river catchment include Lutzville, Vredendal and Vanrhynsdorp situated in the lower catchment area and Clanwilliam and Citrusdal in the middle catchment areas.

== Ecology ==
Endemism in the rivers of the Olifants/Doring basin is unusually high for South Africa, with eight species endemic to the system. The upper Olifants River is one of the main dwelling places of adult sawfins (Pseudobarbus serra). This local endemic is classified as Endangered by the IUCN. At present it is so rare as to be jeopardized by angling or fishing and may not be killed or caught; a long-lived and slow-growing species, it needs several years to grow undisturbed but reaches an adult almost 40 cm after a decade. CapeNature has done trials to adapt it for aquaculture or fishery, but this requires better conservation of the river ecosystem. The Clanwilliam redfin ("P." calidus) is another threatened and legally protected species found in the Olifants River; it is more

The Clanwilliam yellowfish (Labeobarbus seeberi) is another large cyprinid in this basin endemic to the Western Cape region. It has been subject to some captive breeding effort and its stocks are in better shape. However, it may have gone extinct in the Olifants River, and at least is almost certainly gone from between Olifants Gorge and Clanwilliam Dam. Whether it will be reintroduced is unclear, as sawfin and Clanwilliam yellowfish adults are probably ecological competitors, and until the Olifants River is sufficiently restored ecologically both might not be able to thrive at the same time.

The Olifants River marks the northern limit of the Cape galaxias (Galaxias zebratus), a South African fish species sharing the same habitat as imported trout species and living in an area between the Olifants and the Keurbooms River. Although in South Africa this relatively delicate fish is only Near Threatened, in Australia species of the same genus were driven to extinction by competing salmonids. Other species that occur in the Olifants riverine system include Twee River redfin, (Pseudobarbus erubescens), Fiery redfin (Pseudobarbus phlegethon), Austroglanis barnardi, Clanwilliam rock-catfish (Austroglanis gilli), Chubbyhead barb (Enteromius anoplus), and Clanwilliam sandfish (Labeo seeberi).

The most severe biological threat to the river's ecosystem is probably the Smallmouth Bass (Micropterus dolomieu). Originally introduced for sport fishing, it has become something of a pest by depleting the stocks of other fish species. Its eradication is encouraged under the Cape Action for People and the Environment program.

Non-biological threats are mainly excessive removal of river water for irrigation, and the resultant toxic surface runoff from plantations (especially agrumes). These are often grown right up to the river bank, without leaving sufficient natural vegetation to filter out pesticides and fertilizer and halt erosion, and thus causing both river and adjacent cropland to degrade.

== See also ==
- List of rivers of South Africa
