= Clanwilliam, South Africa =

Clanwilliam Klên-hoeilie-heum in Afrikaans orthography
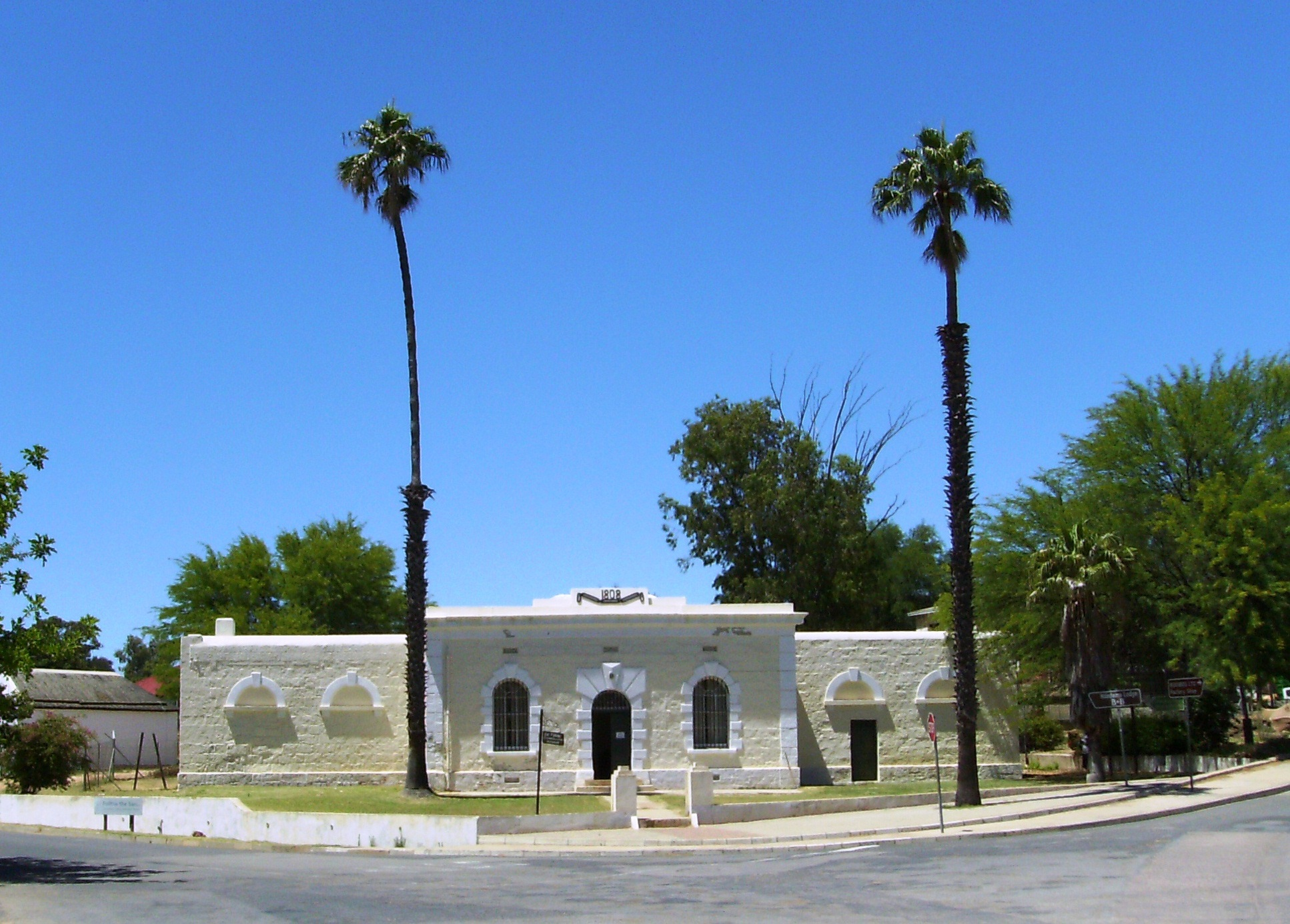
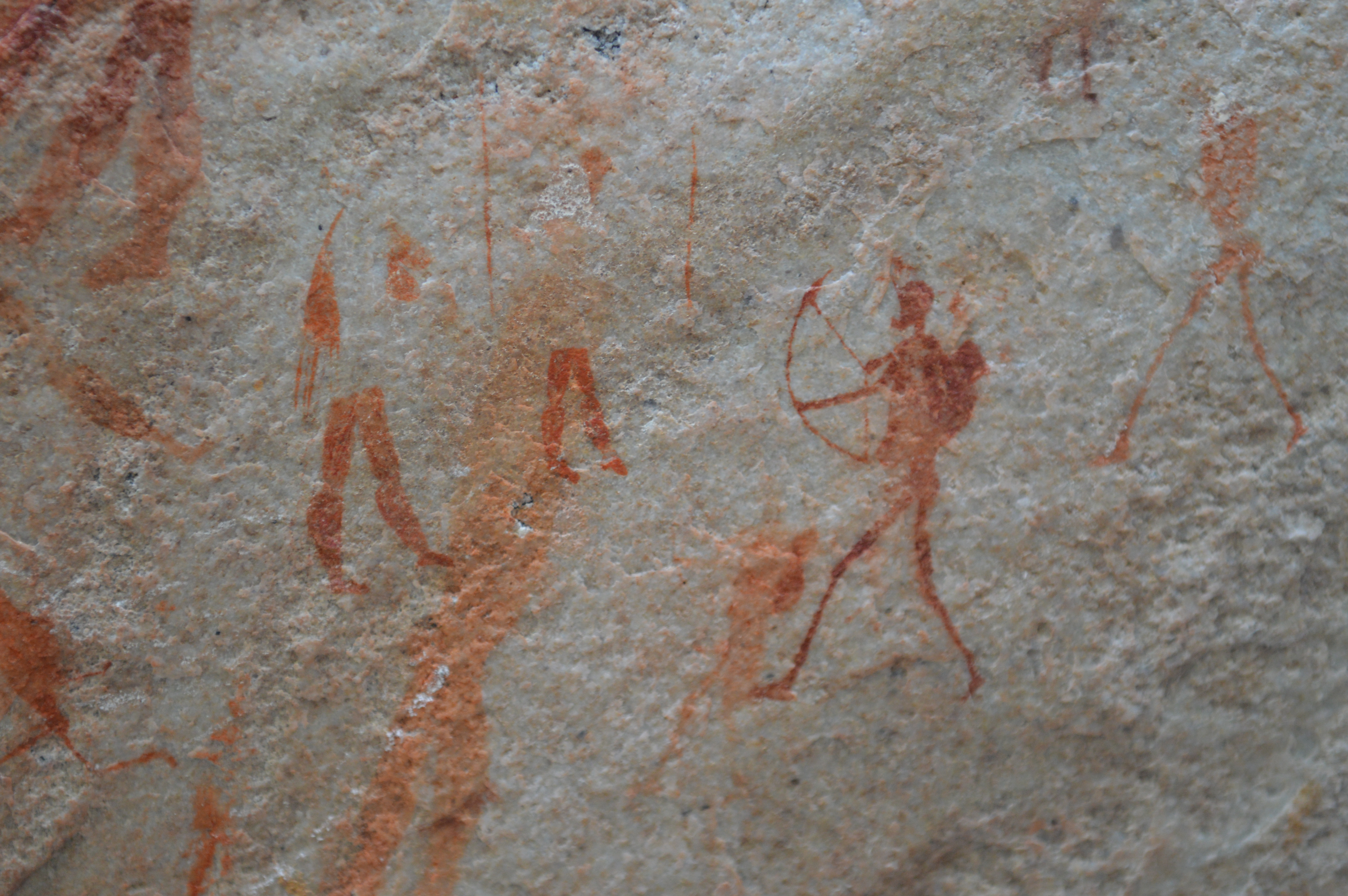
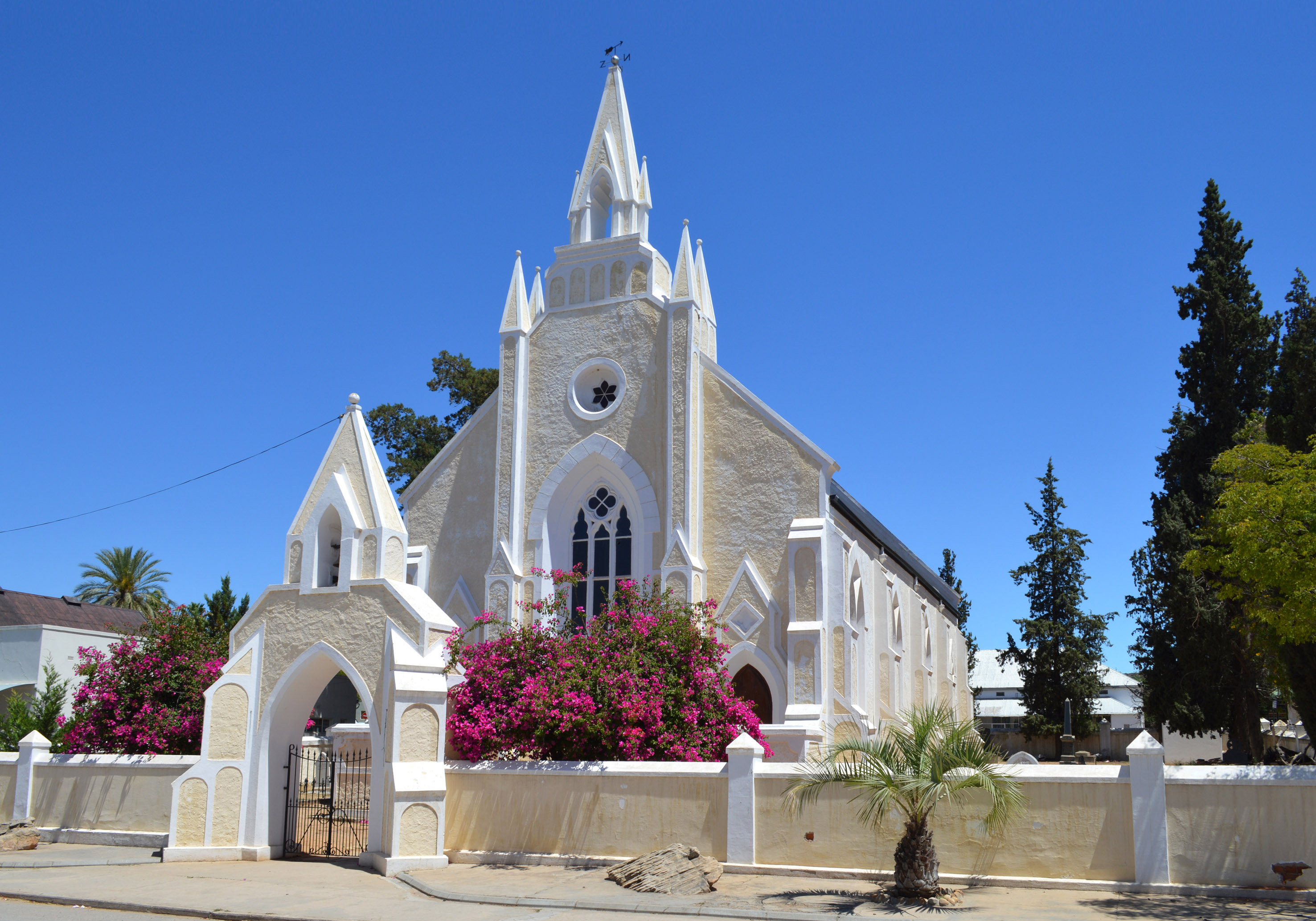
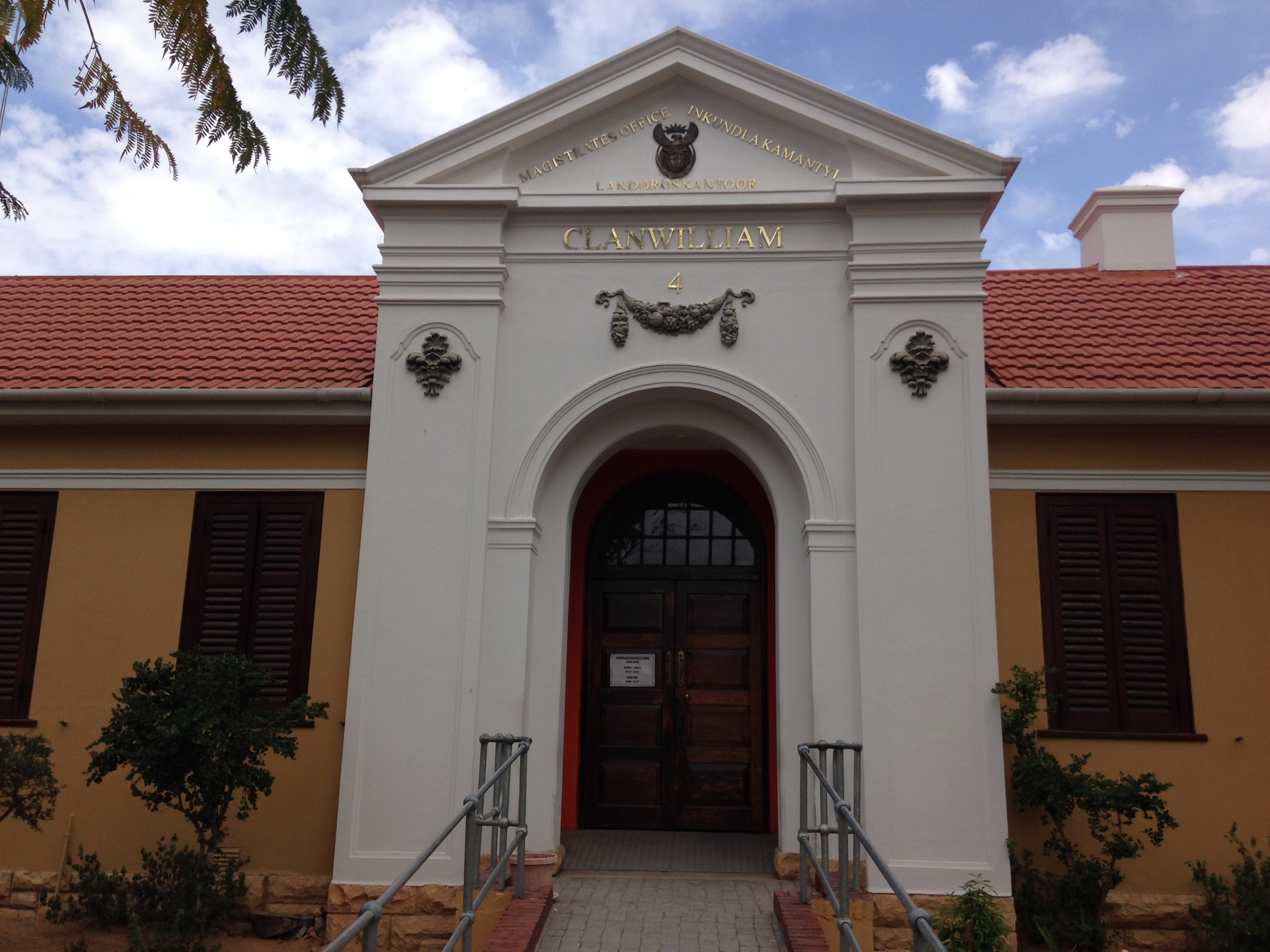
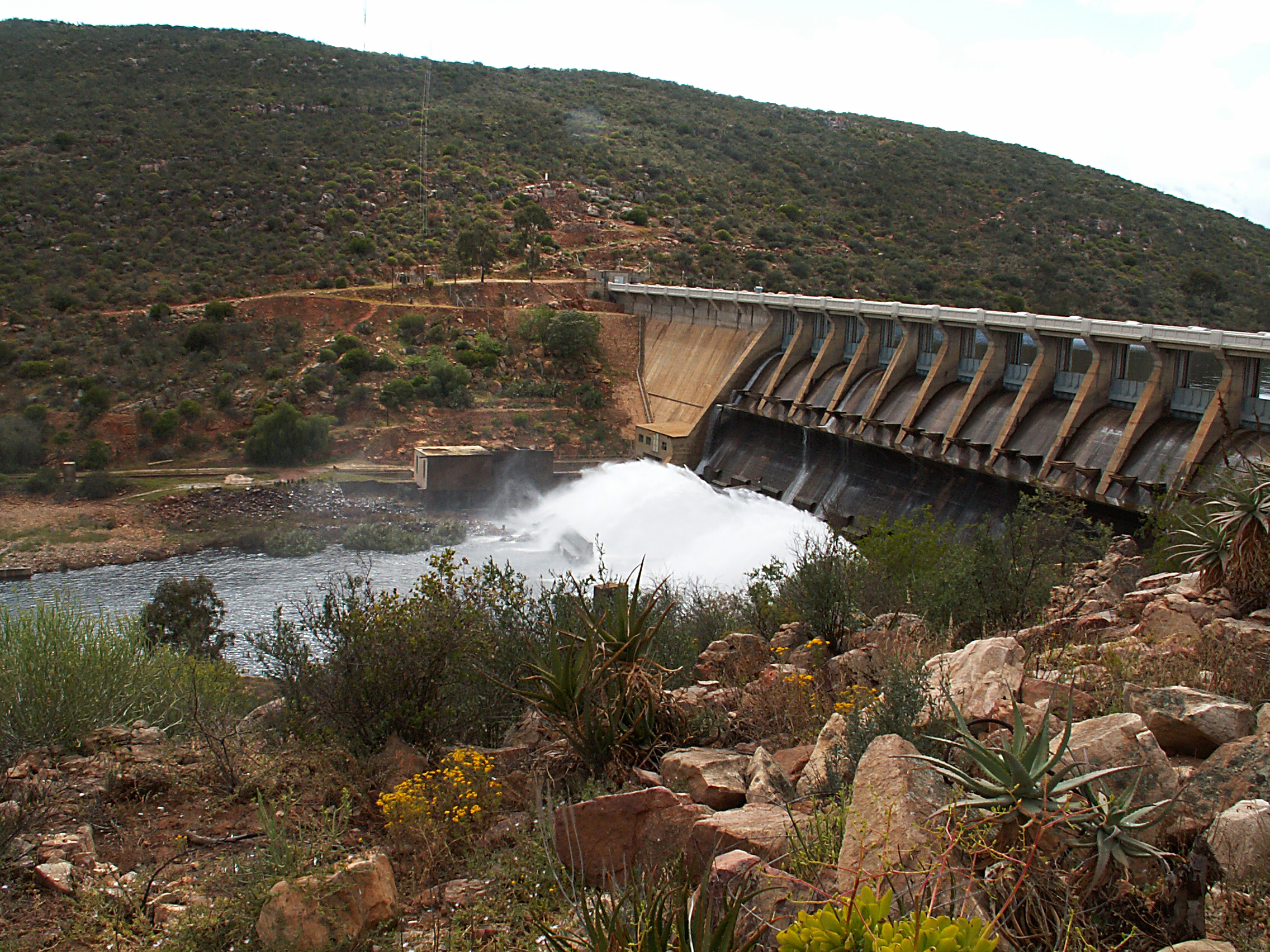
- From top, Clanwilliam museum housed in the Old Gaol. xam rock art in the nearby area (centre left). Dutch Reform Church building in the town centre (centre right). Clawilliam Magistrates Court (bottom left). Clanwilliam Dam (bottom right).

- Location within Western Cape Location within South Africa Location within Africa
- Coordinates: 32°10′43″S 18°53′28″E
- Country: South Africa
- Province: Western Cape
- District: West Coast
- Municipality: Cederberg
- Established: 1806

Government
  - Councillor: Leone Venter (DA)

Area
  - Total: 15.27 km^{2} (5.90 sq mi)
- Elevation: 100 m (330 ft)

Population (2011)
  - Total: 7,674
  - Density: 502.6/km^{2} (1,302/sq mi)

Racial makeup (2011)
  - Black African: 22.6%
  - Coloured: 68.5%
  - Indian/Asian: 0.5%
  - White: 7.7%
  - Other: 0.7%

First languages (2011)
  - Afrikaans: 77.7%
  - Sotho: 9.2%
  - Xhosa: 7.8%
  - English: 2.3%
  - Other: 3.0%
- Time zone: UTC+2 (SAST)
- Postal code (street): 8135
- PO box: 8135
- Area code: 027

Clanwilliam is a town in the Olifants River valley in the Western Cape, South Africa, about 200 kilometres (120 mi) north of Cape Town. It is located in, and the seat of, the Cederberg Local Municipality. As of 2011 Clanwilliam had a population of 7,674.

== Geography ==
John Cradock, the Governor of the Cape Colony (1811–1814), named the town after his father-in-law, The 1st Earl of Clanwilliam, an Anglo-Irish nobleman.

Clanwilliam is situated at an elevation of 100 metres (330 ft), between the western slopes of the Cederberg mountains and the east bank of the Olifants River, which is impounded there by the Clanwilliam Dam. It lies just off the N7 national road, which runs from Cape Town to the Namibian border, and on the R364 road, which runs from Lamberts Bay to Calvinia. Clanwilliam is 230 kilometres (140 mi) from Cape Town by road.

The Dutch Reform Church has been a scheduled national monument since 1973. The mission there used to run a school where Harold Cressy once taught whilst studying to become the first coloured man to gain a degree in Cape Town.

== History ==
In 1930, District Surgeon and botanist Dr Pieter Le Fras Nortier, a former Rhodes scholar, began conducting experiments with the cultivation of the rooibos plant. Dr Nortier also saw the vast commercial potential the tea held for the region. Dr Nortier cultivated the first plants at Clanwilliam on his farm Eastside and on the farm Klein Kliphuis.

Since 2001, Clanwilliam has been the site of the Clanwilliam Arts Festival, run by Cape Town-based Magnet Theatre. During the annual one-week arts festival, workshops in fine arts, dance, music, theatre, and performance are offered to children and youth from Clanwilliam.

Clanwilliam is the birthplace of ZP Theart, former lead vocalist, and founding member of the British power metal band DragonForce, and lead vocalist of the American hard rock band, Skid Row.

== Coats of arms ==
Municipality — The municipal council assumed a coat of arms on 13 February 1964 and registered them with the Cape Provincial Administration in August 1964.

The arms, designed by Cornelis Pama, were : Or, a fess wavy Azure charged with a bar wavy Argent between in chief an elephant's head caboshed the trunk surmounting the fess proper and in base a trefoil Vert; a bordure embattled Ermine. In layman's terms : a golden shield with a blue wavy stripe across the centre and a narrower white wavy stripe on top of that, in the upper half of the shield is an elephant's head with the trunk hanging over the wavy stripes, and at the bottom of the shield is green trefoil, the whole design surrounded by an ermine border with an embattled edge.

The crest was an orange tree, and the motto Toujours pret ("always prepared"). Both the motto and the ermine on the shield were derived from the Earl of Clanwilliam's arms.

Divisional council — The Clanwilliam divisional council (the local authority for the rural areas outside the town) registered a coat of arms at the Bureau of Heraldry in May 1976.

The arms were : Or, on a pale wavy Azure, between two oranges stalked proper, four wavy endorses Argent; a pointe ente Gules charged with a cluster of three cones of the Clanwilliam cedar Or. In layman's terms : a golden shield displaying two oranges on either side of a blue wavy vertical stripe bearing four narrow white wavy lines, at the bottom of the shield three golden Clanwilliam cedar cones on a red triangle.

The crest was a bunch of grapes between two elephant trunks, and the motto Fide labora.

== See also ==
- !Kora Wars
