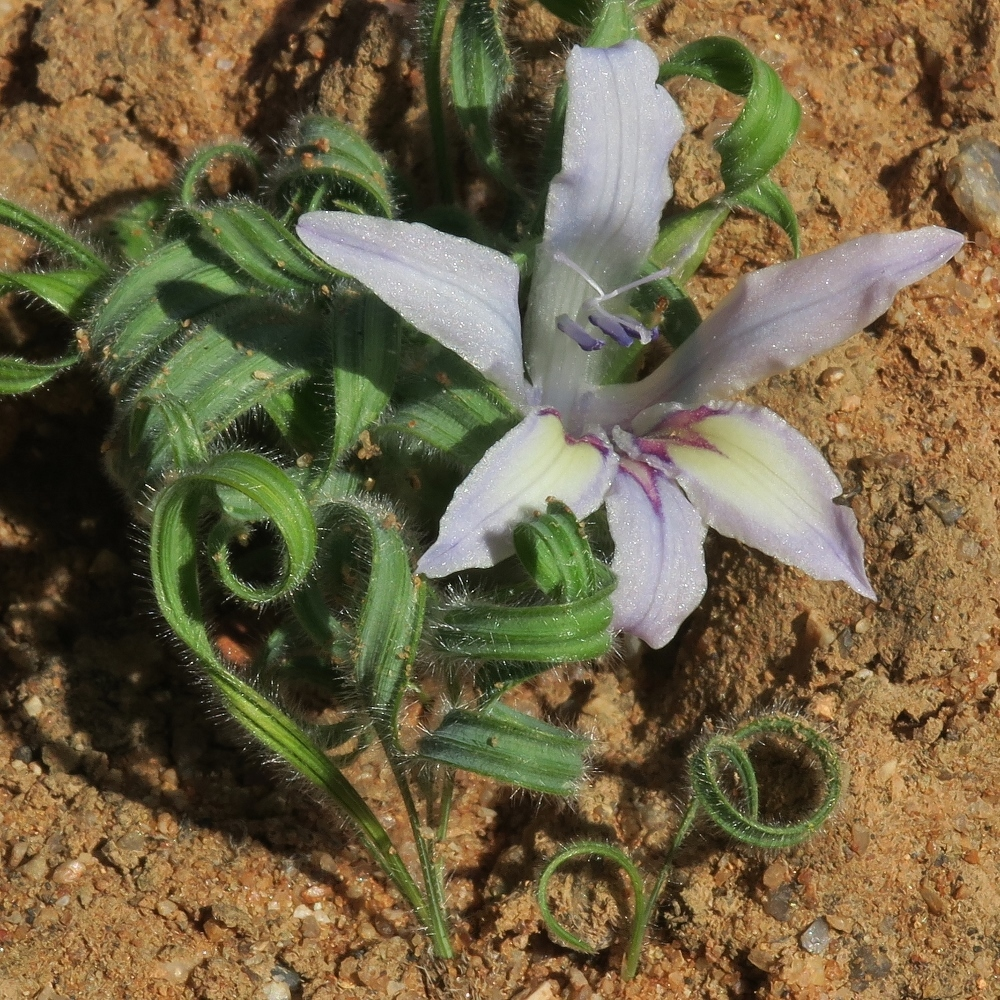

Scientific classification
- Kingdom: Plantae
- Clade: Tracheophytes
- Clade: Angiosperms
- Clade: Monocots
- Order: Asparagales
- Family: Iridaceae
- Genus: Babiana
- Species: B. torta

Binomial name
- Babiana torta (G.J.Lewis)

= Babiana torta =

Species of flowering plant

Babiana torta is a species of geophyte of 7–15 cm (2.8–5.9 in) high that is assigned to the family Iridaceae. It has pale mirror-symmetrical flowers with a long narrow tube that split into six tepal lobes, have three stamens, and line- to lance-shaped, laterally compressed, undulating and coiled leaves. It is an endemic species of South Africa that can be found in the extreme north of the Western Cape province and the coastal mountains of the Northern Cape south of Namaqualand. It flowers from mid May to mid June.

== Description ==
Babiana torta is a perennial plant of mostly 4–8 cm (1.6–3.1 in), sometimes up to 12 cm high, that emerges from an underground globular corm at the start of its growing season. It has an unbranched stem that is largely underground but sometimes extends up to 1 cm (0.39 in) above the ground. It has soft-textured, undulating, lance-shaped, softly hairy or nearly hairless leaves of mostly 7–12 mm (0.28–0.47 in), sometimes up to 18 mm wide, that are twisted beyond midlength, with usually only the margins and central vein thickened. Young leaves however, do not undulate, are loosely coiled and distinctly hairy. The 2 bracts subtending each flower are slightly hairy, forked in the upper third, 17–20 mm (0.67–0.79 in) long, green with the tip drying to pale brown, the inner bract as long as or slightly longer than the outer.

Each inflorescence carries mostly 1–3, sometimes up to 5 mirror-symmetrical, sweetly scented flowers close to the ground. The perianth is mauve to pale slate-blue, sometimes white, the lower tepal having pale yellow to white central blotches, that are mostly edged with darker blue. The perianth tube is 2-2¼ cm long, the dorsal tepal with 3-3½ cm considerably larger than the three lower tepals that measure 2¼-2½ cm. The stamens are clustered under the dorsal tepal, have arched filaments of about 15 mm (0.59 in) that carry anthers of about 6 mm (0.24 in) long. The ovary is hairless and the style divides into the three branches at the tip of the anthers. It flowers mostly between the middle of May and the middle of June.

=== Differences with similar species ===
Babiana torta can easily be confused with Babiana namaquensis, which as a more northerly distribution and grows on limestone, but is also a low plant, with few pale bluish to white flowers and twisted leaves. B. namaquensis however, has smooth to sparsely hairy leaves, always smooth bracts, and a perianth tube of 2½-2¾ cm long. Babiana torta usually has densely hairy leaves, a perianth tube of 2-2¼ cm long, and prominently veined, mostly silky hairy or sparsely velvety bracts.

== Taxonomy ==
This species was first described by South African botanist Gwendoline Joyce Lewis in her extensive revision of the genus Babiana, that was published 1959, based on specimens collected about 16 km (9.9 mi) east of the road between Kliprand and Brakfontein in the Kamiesberg area in 1958.

== Distribution, ecology and conservation ==
Babiana torta can be found in the Kamiesberg between the granite hills south of Kliprand, Springbok in the north and Bitterfontein, Nuwerus and Koekenaap in the west. This species mostly grows in the cracks of granite outcrops. This species is known from 12 locations, appears to be common in its preferred environment, its population is stable and no threats have been identified. Its continued survival is therefore considered of least concern.
