= R363 (South Africa) =

Regional route in South Africa

Regional route R363
- R363 route map

Route information
- Length: 100 km (62 mi)

Major junctions
- North end: N7 in Nuwerus
- R362 in Lutzville; R27 in Vredendal; R362 in Klawer
- South end: N7 in Klawer

Location
- Country: South Africa
- Towns: Koekenaap; Klawer; Lutzville; Nuwerus; Vredendal

Highway system
- Numbered routes of South Africa
← R362	→ R364

The R363 is a Regional Route in South Africa that connects Nuwerus on the N7 and Klawer, also on the N7 (between Clanwilliam and Vanrhynsdorp), via Vredendal.

From its northern terminus at Nuwerus on the N7, it heads south. It meets the R362 at Lutzville on the Olifants River. The two run parallel to each other heading south-east for the rest of their length. The R362 on the north bank of the Olfiants, and R363 on the south (it crosses the river after meeting the R362). The two routes both pass through Vredendal, where the R27 restarts from the R363, crossing the R362 and heading east-north-east. The two routes intersect again at Klawer, with only the R363 continuing to the N7.
