= R362 (South Africa) =

Regional route in South Africa

Regional route R362
- R362 route map

Route information
- Length: 78 km (48 mi)

Major junctions
- East end: R363 in Klawer
- R27 outside Vredendal; R363 in Lutzville
- West end: Doringbaai

Location
- Country: South Africa
- Towns: Doringbaai; Klawer; Lutzville; Strandfontein; Vredendal

Highway system
- Numbered routes of South Africa
← R361	→ R363

The R362 is a Regional Route in South Africa that connects Strandfontein with the N7 at Klawer.

Its western terminus is Strandfontein on the Atlantic Ocean. It heads north along the coast to Papenkuil. From Papenkuil, it heads north-east along the south bank of the Olifants River. It crosses this river near Lutzville where it meets the north-west/south-east R363. The two run parallel to each other heading south-east for the rest of their length. The R362 on the north bank of the Olfiants, and R363 on the south (it crosses the river after meeting the R362). The two routes both pass through Vredendal, where the R27 restarts from the R363, crossing the R362 and heading east-north-east. The two routes intersect again at Klawer, with only the R363 continuing to the N7.
