= Ebenhaeser =

- Location within Western Cape Location within South Africa
- Coordinates: 31°35′8″S 18°14′39″E
- Country: South Africa
- Province: Western Cape
- District: West Coast
- Municipality: Matzikama

Area
  - Total: 0.68 km^{2} (0.26 sq mi)

Population (2011)
  - Total: 1,305
  - Density: 1,900/km^{2} (5,000/sq mi)

Racial makeup (2011)
  - Black African: 0.3%
  - Coloured: 99.2%
  - Indian/Asian: 0.4%
  - White: 0.2%

First languages (2011)
  - Afrikaans: 97.5%
  - English: 2.0%
  - Other: 0.5%
- Time zone: UTC+2 (SAST)
- PO box: 8149

Ebenhaeser is a settlement in West Coast District Municipality in the Western Cape province of South Africa.

A mission station of the Rhenish Missionary Society at the mouth of the Olifants River in the former Vanrhynsdorp district was established here by a German named Wurmb in 1831. The name, a version of Ebenezer, is of biblical origin (1 Sam. 7:12) and means 'stone of help'.
