= N7 (South Africa) =

National road in South Africa

National route N7

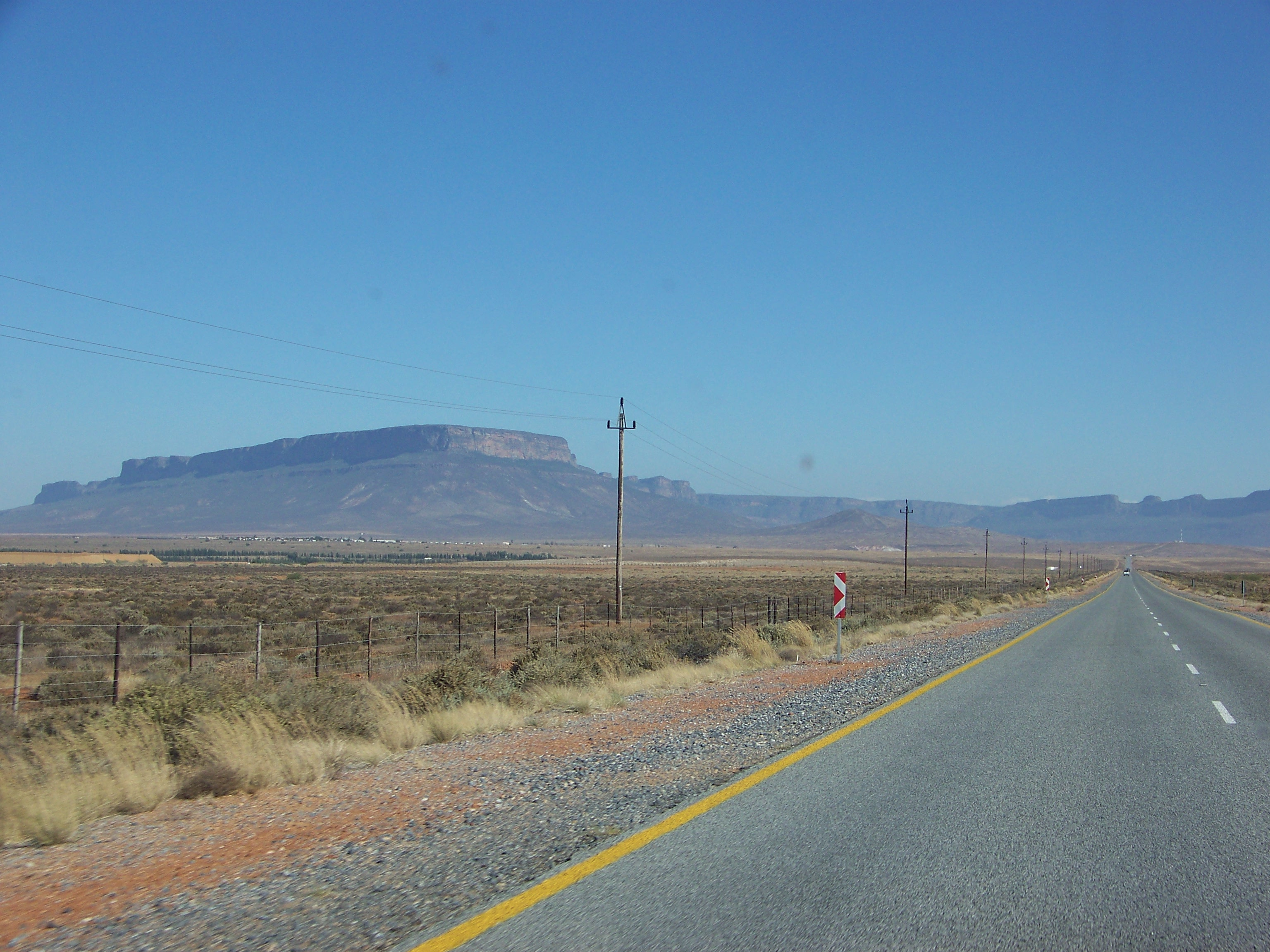
- The N7 north of Vanrhynsdorp

Route information
- Maintained by SANRAL
- Length: 666 km (414 mi)

Major junctions
- South end: N1 in Cape Town
- N14 at Springbok
- North end: B1 at the Namibian border at Vioolsdrif

Location
- Country: South Africa
- Provinces: Western Cape, Northern Cape
- Major cities: Cape Town; Malmesbury; Piketberg; Clanwilliam; Vredendal; Vanrhynsdorp; Springbok

Highway system
- Numbered routes of South Africa
← N6	→ N8

The N7 is a national route in South Africa that runs from Cape Town northwards through the West Coast and Namaqualand regions to the Namibian border at Vioolsdrif. It is known as the Cape Namibia Road. After crossing the border, it changes designation to B1 and runs north through Windhoek and the north of Namibia.

The N7 national route forms the first section of the Tripoli-Cape Town Highway, which is a proposed link between Cape Town and Tripoli, the capital city of Libya, being developed by the United Nations Economic Commission for Africa (UNECA), the African Development Bank (AfDB) and the African Union.

== Route ==
Detailed Route

The N7 begins at a four-way interchange with the N1 national route in Cape Town, adjacent to Acacia Park and Summer Greens, heading northwards. South of this interchange, it is the M7 route of Cape Town (Jakes Gerwel Drive).

The portion of the road within Cape Town is a freeway, but it loses limited-access freeway status shortly after exiting the urban limits at the M12 interchange (Malibongwe Drive). From here, it remains a dual-carriageway and gains limited-access freeway status again at the Melkbosstrand M19 interchange. It remains a limited-access freeway until just after Malmesbury at the R45 intersection. Thereafter, the N7 is a single-carriageway highway with wide paved shoulders to Piekenierskloof Pass and through the Olifants River valley until Clanwilliam.

The rest of the N7 to the Namibian border, through Vredendal and Springbok (where it meets the N14 national route) is a single-carriageway highway with no paved shoulders.

After crossing into Namibia, it becomes the B1 road to Keetmanshoop and Windhoek.

== Junctions ==
=== Western Cape ===
Municipality	Location	km	mi	Exit	Destinations	Notes
Cape Town	Summer Greens	0	0	—	M7 Jakes Gerwel Drive, Goodwood	
Cape Town	Summer Greens	0	0	13A	N1 west, Cape Town	Signed as exit 13 southbound
Cape Town	Summer Greens	0	0	13B	N1 east, Paarl	Signed as exit 13 southbound
Cape Town	Milnerton	1	1	14	M8 Bosmansdam Road, Milnerton, Edgemead, Bothasig	
Cape Town	Milnerton	4	2	17	M14 Plattekloof Road, Milnerton, Bothasig	
Cape Town	Dunoon	9	6	22	M12 Malibongwe Boulevard, Table View, M5 Potsdam Road, Milnerton, M13 Tygerberg Valley Road, Durbanville	
Cape Town	Parklands	11	7	—	M48 Vissershok Road, Durbanville	Closed at-grade intersection
Cape Town	Parklands	13	8	—	Van Schoorsdrif Road, Philadelphia	Future interchange; planned opening 2027
Cape Town	Melkbosstrand	18	11	31	M19 Melkbosstrand Road, Melkbosstrand	
Cape Town	Philadelphia	25	15	39	R304 Philadelphia Road, Philadelphia, Stellenbosch, Atlantis	
Swartland	Kalbaskraal	36	22	50	Klein Dassenberg Road, Kalbaskraal, Chatsworth, Atlantis	
Swartland	Kalbaskraal	38	24	52	Rivier Street, Kalbaskraal, Chatsworth	Southbound exit, northbound entrance
Swartland	Abbotsdale	44	27	59	Tierfontein Road, Tierfontein	
Swartland	Abbotsdale	48	30	63	Bloemendal Road, Abbotsdale	
Swartland	Malmesbury	52	32	65	R315 Bokomo Road, Malmesbury, Darling	
Swartland	Malmesbury	55	34	68	Voortrekker Street, Malmesbury	
Swartland	Malmesbury	58	36	71	R45, Hopefield, Vredenburg, Paarl	
Swartland	Moorreesburg	86	53	—	R311 east, Riebeek West, Riebeek-Kasteel	At-grade intersection; Southern end of concurrency with R311
Swartland	Moorreesburg	86	53	—	R311 west, Moorreesburg, Hopefield	At-grade intersection; Northern end of concurrency with R311
Bergrivier	Piketberg	110	68	—	R399, Velddrif	At-grade intersection
Bergrivier	Piketberg	117	73	—	R365 Long Street, Piketberg, Elands Bay	At-grade intersection
Bergrivier	Piketberg	118	73	—	R44 Kerk Street, Piketberg, Porterville	At-grade traffic circle
Cederberg	Citrusdal	161	100	—	R303, Citrusdal, Ceres	At-grade intersection
Cederberg	Clanwilliam	213	132	225	R364, Clanwilliam, Lambert's Bay	
Matzikama	Klawer	262	163	—	R363 east, Melkboom	At-grade intersection; Southern end of concurrency with R363
Matzikama	Klawer	268	167	—	R363 west, Klawer, Vredendal	At-grade intersection; Northern end of concurrency with R363
Matzikama	Vanrhynsdorp	289	180	—	R27 Van Riebeeck Street, Vanrhynsdorp, Vredendal, Calvinia	Quadrant interchange
Matzikama	Nuwerus	356	221	—	R363, Nuwerus, Vredendal	At-grade intersection
Matzikama	Bitterfontein	376	234	—	R358, Pofadder	At-grade intersection
N7 continues into the Northern Cape

=== Northern Cape ===
Municipality	Location	km	mi	Exit	Destinations	Notes
Nama Khoi	Springbok	548	341	549	R355 Kokerboom Road, Springbok, Kliprand, N14 Voortrekker Street, Pofadder	
Nama Khoi	Springbok	551	342	551	Inry Street, Springbok (North)	
Nama Khoi	Okiep	555	345	556	Goodhouse Street, Okiep, Nababeep	
Nama Khoi	Steinkopf	597	371	609	R382, Steinkopf, Port Nolloth	At-grade intersection
Nama Khoi	Vioolsdrif	666	414	Vioolsdrif Border Post		
N7 ends at South Africa–Namibia border; B1 begins
