= Xanthoparmelia tumidosa =

Scientific classification
- Kingdom: Fungi
- Division: Ascomycota
- Class: Lecanoromycetes
- Order: Lecanorales
- Family: Parmeliaceae
- Genus: Xanthoparmelia
- Species: X. tumidosa

Binomial name
- Xanthoparmelia tumidosa Hale (1986)

Species of lichen

Xanthoparmelia tumidosa is a species of saxicolous (rock-dwelling), foliose lichen in the family Parmeliaceae. Found in Southern Africa, it was formally described as a new species in 1986 by the American lichenologist Mason Hale. The type specimen was collected about 1 km (0.6 mi) south of Nuwerus on R363 (Cape Province) at an elevation of about 500 m (1,600 ft), where it was found in a pasture growing on a large sandstone ledge. The lichen thallus, leathery in texture and tightly attached to its rock substrate, is bright yellowish green and measures 3–6 cm (1.2–2.4 in) wide. It comprises short, somewhat linear lobes that are 1.5–2.0 mm wide and become crowded and bullate (blistered) at the thallus center. X. tumidosa contains protocetraric acid and usnic acid.

== See also ==
- List of Xanthoparmelia species
