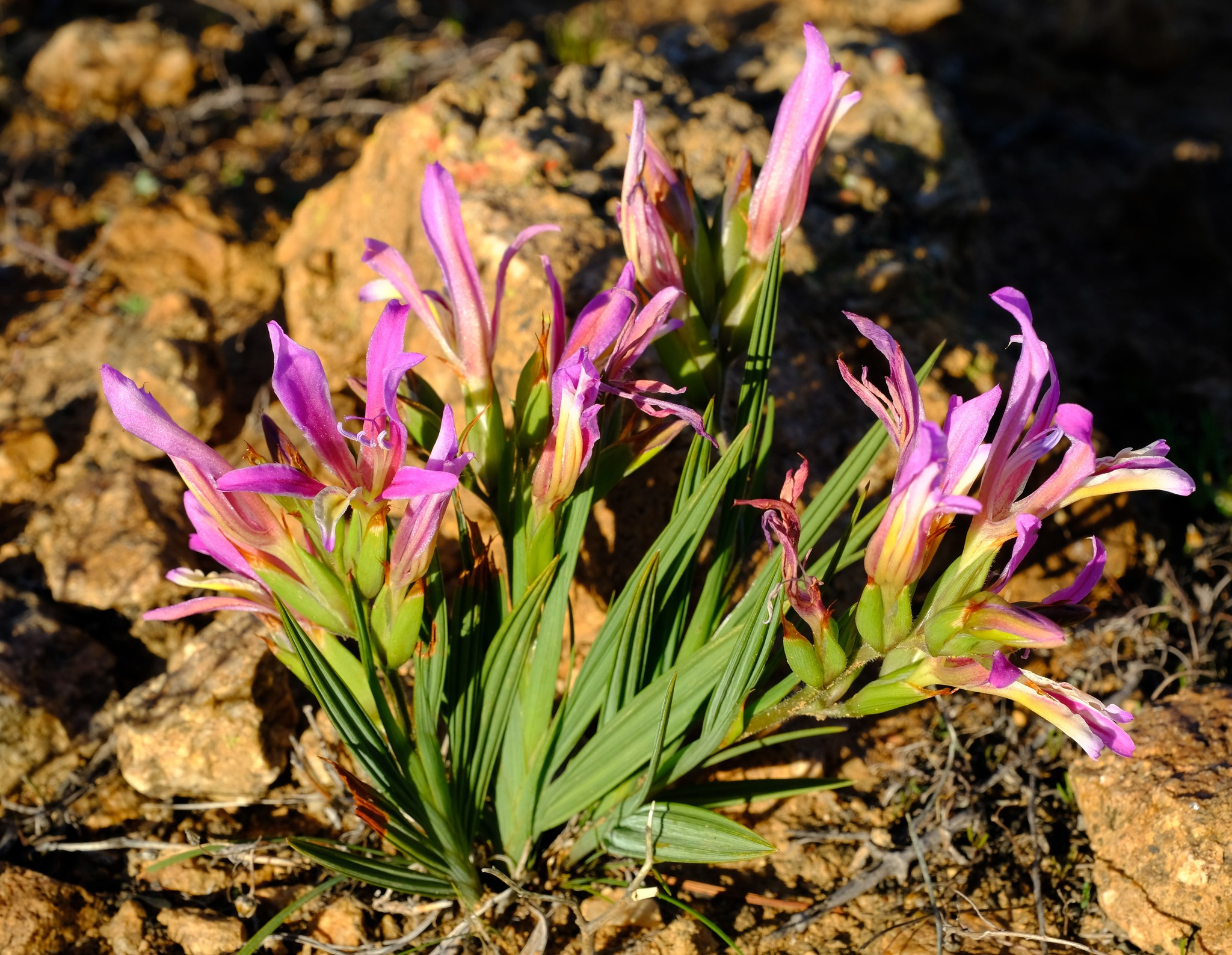

Scientific classification
- Kingdom: Plantae
- Clade: Tracheophytes
- Clade: Angiosperms
- Clade: Monocots
- Order: Asparagales
- Family: Iridaceae
- Genus: Babiana
- Species: B. pilosa

Binomial name
- Babiana pilosa G.J.Lewis

= Babiana pilosa =

Species of flowering plant

Babiana pilosa is a geophytic perennial flowering plant of 10–15 cm (3.9–5.9 in) that is assigned to the Iridaceae family. It has narrowly lance-shaped, slightly pleated leaves and pink mirror-symmetric flowers with cream-coloured markings. The species is endemic to the Western Cape. It occurs at Nuwerus and is part of the succulent Karoo vegetation. The species is considered rare.

== Description ==
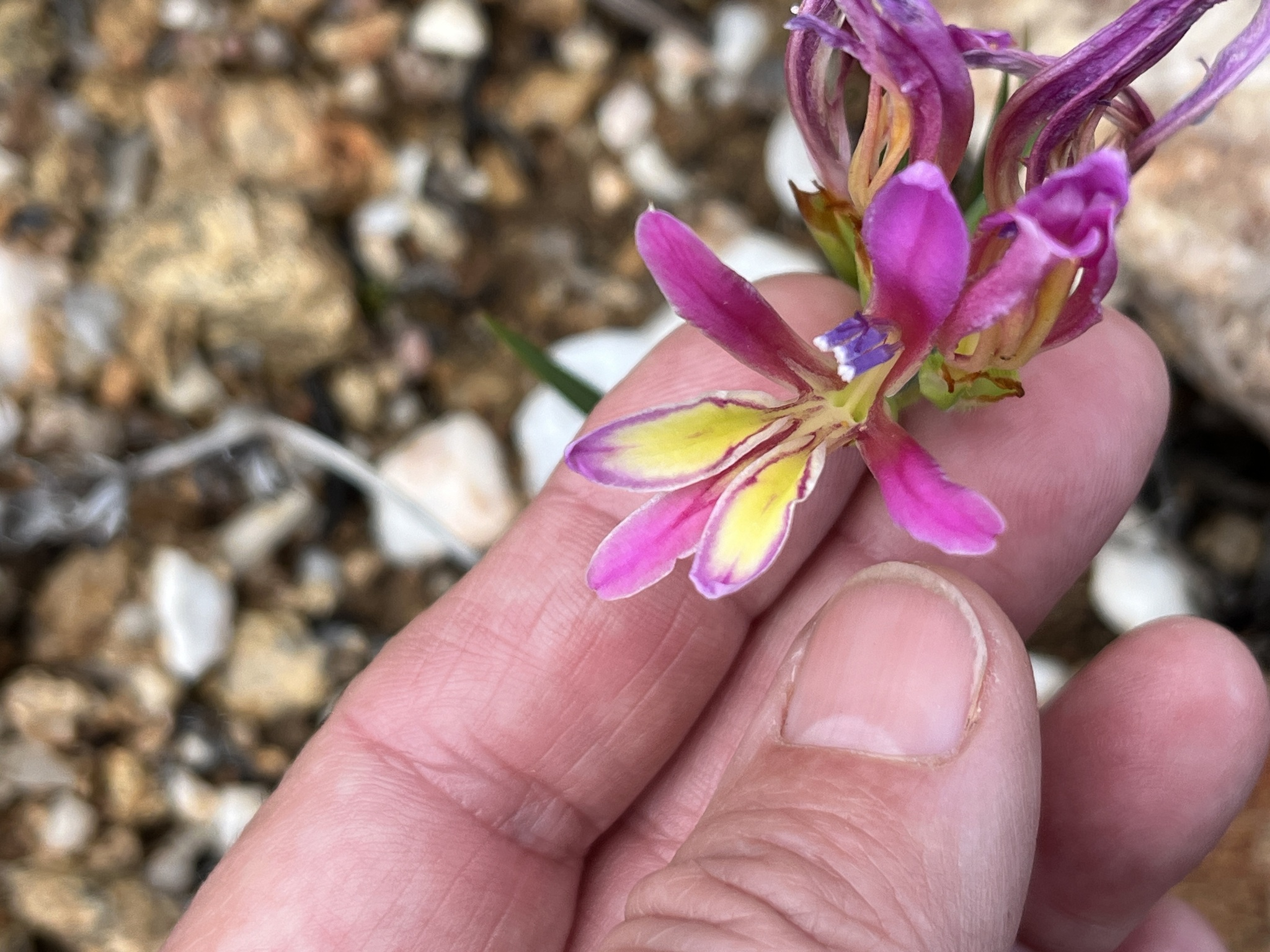
Detail of the mirror-symmetric flower, showing the clustered, bluish purple anthers.

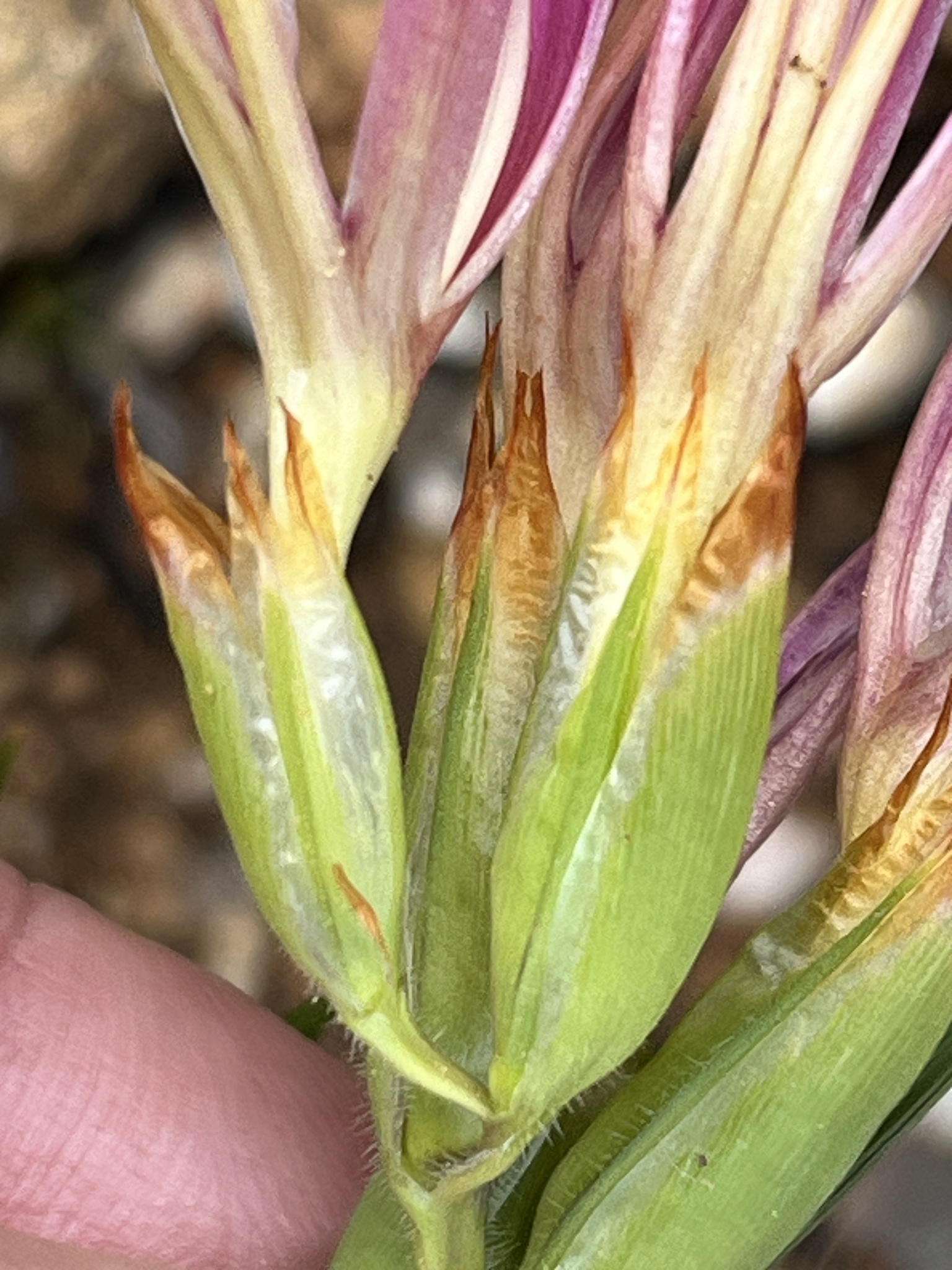
Bracts, dry and rusty at the tip, the inner forked at the tip.

Babiana pilosa is a perennial flowering plant of 10–15 cm (3.9–5.9 in) tall. Like most Babiana species it has a globe-shaped corm underground that roots below. It has an erect, usually unbranched stem that reaches some distance above the ground surface with downwardly bent hairs above, and is enclosed with fibres forming a thick collar at its base. The leaf blades sit on long pseudo-petioles, are narrowly lance-shaped, slightly pleated and with few hairs pointing towards the base. Each flower is subtended by two opposing green bracts which have rust-coloured, dry tips. The inner bract is slightly shorter than outer and forked forming two pointed tips. The 2-5 mirror-symmetric, magenta-pink flowers are set at het upper side of a horizontally stretching spike. The lower lateral tepals carry yellow markings. At the base, the six tepals are all fused into a tube of 15–18 mm (0.59–0.71 in) long. The tepals are unequal in size. The dorsal tepal is 30–34 mm (1.2–1.3 in) long. The lower three tepals are merged with the upper lateral tepals for about 4 mm more than with the dorsal tepal, thus forming a prominent lower lip of 20–28 mm (0.79–1.10 in) long. The three stamens are clustered together near the dorsal tepal and consist of about 15 mm (0.59 in) long filaments topped by about 6 mm long anthers. The ovary is hairless or sometimes has few hairs on the ribs. It is topped by the style that divides in three branches about 5 mm (0.20 in) long opposite the middle of the anthers. Babiana pilosa flowers between late July and August.

== Taxonomy ==
The quartz bobbejaantjie was first scientifically described by Gwendoline Joyce Lewis in 1959.

== Distribution, ecology and conservation ==
Babiana pilosa occurs to the south and west of Nuwerus, towards Lutzville, in southern Namaqualand, Western Cape province of South Africa where it grows often on patches of quartzite in stony hills. It is only known from four locations, but the population is probably stable. Therefore it is considered rare in South Africa, but is global conservation status is least concern.
