= Babiana striata =

Conservation status
- Least Concern (IUCN 3.1)

Scientific classification
- Kingdom: Plantae
- Clade: Tracheophytes
- Clade: Angiosperms
- Clade: Monocots
- Order: Asparagales
- Family: Iridaceae
- Genus: Babiana
- Species: B. striata

Binomial name
- Babiana striata (Jacq.) G.J.Lewis

Synonyms
- Antholyza striata (Jacq.) Klatt; Gladiolus formosus Pers.; Gladiolus striatus Jacq.; Hebea formosa (Pers.) Eckl.; Montbretia striata (Jacq.) Voigt; Tritonia striata (Jacq.) Ker Gawl.

Species of flowering plant

Babiana striata is a perennial flowering plant and geophyte belonging to the genus Babiana. The species is endemic to the Northern Cape and Western Cape and occurs from the Richtersveld to Nuwerus. It is part of the succulent Karoo vegetation.
