= Doringbaai =

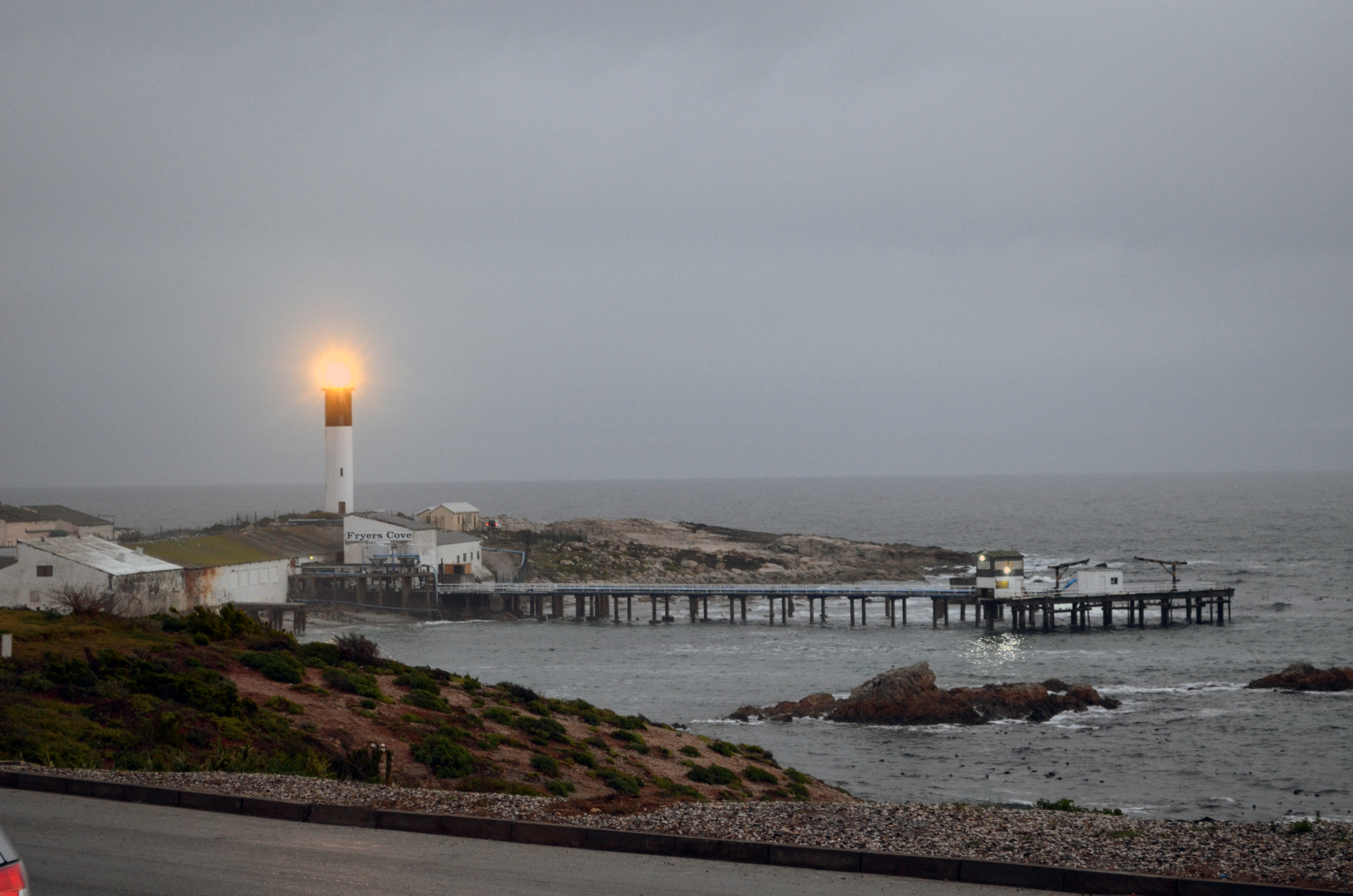

- Location within Western Cape Location within South Africa
- Coordinates: 31°49′S 18°14′E
- Country: South Africa
- Province: Western Cape
- District: West Coast
- Municipality: Matzikama

Area
  - Total: 1.79 km^{2} (0.69 sq mi)

Population (2011)
  - Total: 1,260
  - Density: 704/km^{2} (1,820/sq mi)

Racial makeup (2011)
  - Black African: 2.7%
  - Coloured: 90.2%
  - Indian/Asian: 0.1%
  - White: 6.9%
  - Other: 0.2%

First languages (2011)
  - Afrikaans: 96.4%
  - English: 2.7%
  - Other: 1.0%
- Time zone: UTC+2 (SAST)
- Postal code (street): 8151
- PO box: 8151

Doringbaai is a settlement in West Coast District Municipality in the Western Cape province of South Africa.

Doringbaai, previously known as Doornbaai, is a small fishing village. The main economic activity is the packaging and export of crayfish. In the past, the bay at Doringbaai was used as an anchorage for the trade route; provisions were deposited here and transported to Vanrhynsdorp by camel. The lighthouse, one of the local landmarks, was built in 1963.

Local fishers have opposed offshore oil and gas exploration and expansion.
