= Rietpoort =

- Location within Western Cape Location within South Africa
- Coordinates: 30.95°S 18.05°E
- Country: South Africa
- Province: Western Cape
- District: West Coast
- Municipality: Matzikama

Area
  - Total: 2.59 km^{2} (1.00 sq mi)

Population (2011)
  - Total: 970
  - Density: 370/km^{2} (970/sq mi)

Racial makeup (2011)
  - Black African: 0.3%
  - Coloured: 99.1%
  - Indian/Asian: 0.5%
  - White: 0.1%

First languages (2011)
  - Afrikaans: 96.8%
  - English: 1.2%
  - Other: 2.0%
- Time zone: UTC+2 (SAST)
- Postal code (street): 9966
- PO box: 9966
- Area code: 048

Rietpoort is a settlement in Matzikama Municipality in the Western Cape province of South Africa.
