= R362 road =

R362 road may refer to:

- R362 road (Ireland)
- R362 road (South Africa)
