= Phiambolia incumbens =

Scientific classification
- Kingdom: Plantae
- Clade: Tracheophytes
- Clade: Angiosperms
- Clade: Eudicots
- Order: Caryophyllales
- Family: Aizoaceae
- Genus: Phiambolia
- Species: P. incumbens

Binomial name
- Phiambolia incumbens (L.Bolus) Klak

Synonyms
- Ruschia incumbens L.Bolus

Species of succulent

Phiambolia incumbens is a small succulent plant that is part of the Aizoaceae family. The species is endemic to the Western Cape and occurs from Klawer to Clanwilliam and the Katbakkies Pass. There are three known subpopulations and the plant is part of the fynbos. The species is considered rare.
