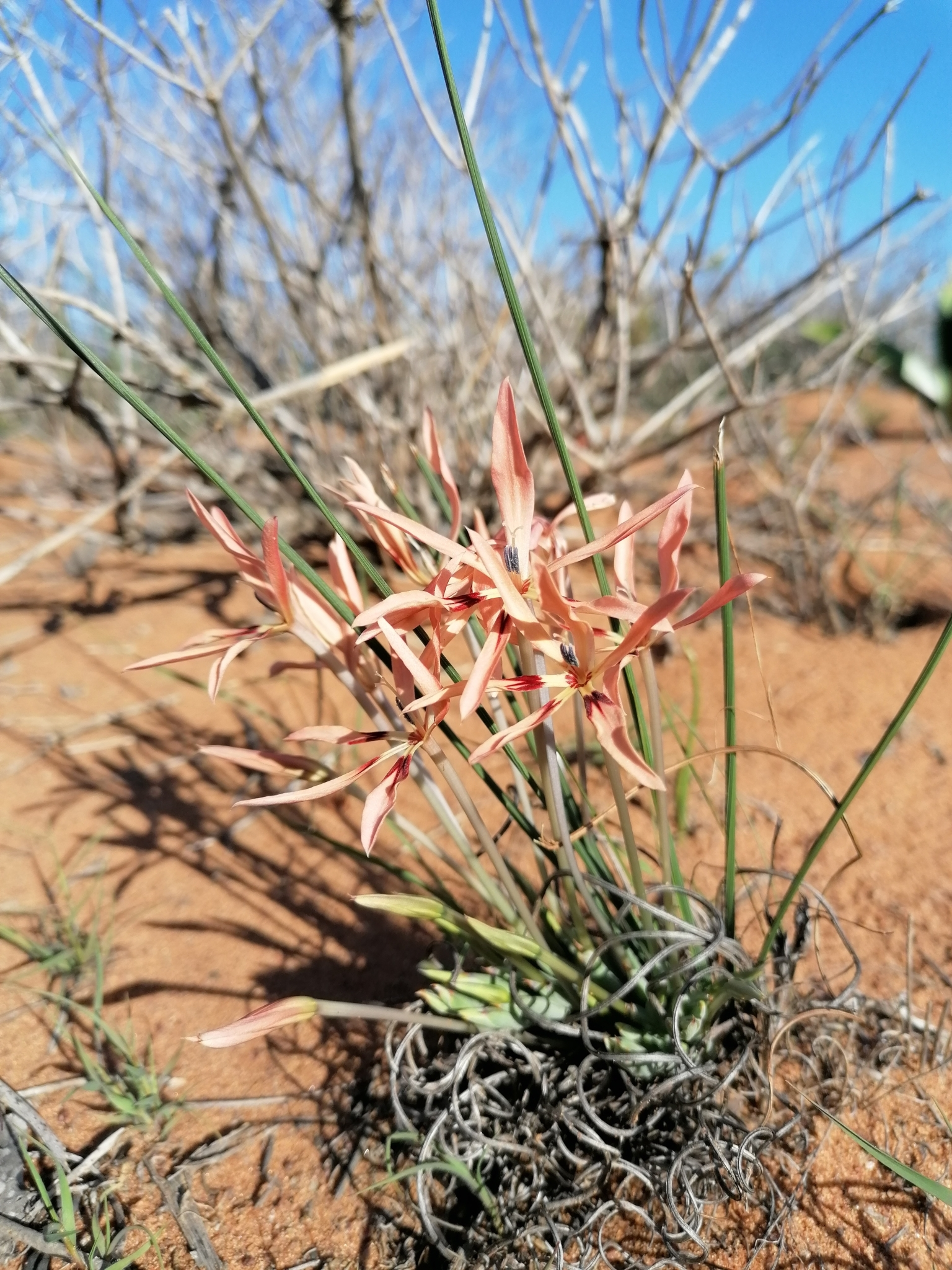

Scientific classification
- Kingdom: Plantae
- Clade: Tracheophytes
- Clade: Angiosperms
- Clade: Monocots
- Order: Asparagales
- Family: Iridaceae
- Genus: Babiana
- Species: B. teretifolia

Binomial name
- Babiana teretifolia J.C.Manning & Goldblatt

= Babiana teretifolia =

Species of flowering plant

Babiana teretifolia is a species of geophytic, perennial flowering plant in the family Iridaceae. The species is endemic to the Western Cape and occurs west of Koekenaap. It is part of the Namaqualand fynbos. Mining activities have already destroyed part of the plant's habitat in the northern part of the plant's range and it is estimated that the plant will lose a further 80% of its habitat over the next 30 years due to mining. The plant is considered rare.
