= Strandfontein =

Strandfontein may refer to:

- Strandfontein, Cape Town, a resort within Cape Town in the Western Cape province of South Africa
- Strandfontein, Matzikama, a village in the Western Cape province of South Africa
