= Zelotes namaquus =

Bitterfontein Dark Ground Spider

Conservation status
- Least Concern (SANBI Red List)

Scientific classification
- Kingdom: Animalia
- Phylum: Arthropoda
- Subphylum: Chelicerata
- Class: Arachnida
- Order: Araneae
- Infraorder: Araneomorphae
- Family: Gnaphosidae
- Genus: Zelotes
- Species: Z. namaquus

Binomial name
- Zelotes namaquus FitzPatrick, 2007

Species of spider

Zelotes namaquus is a species of spider in the family Gnaphosidae. It is endemic to South Africa and is commonly known as the bitterfontein dark ground spider.

== Distribution ==
Zelotes namaquus is known from two South African provinces: Limpopo and Northern Cape. The species occurs at altitudes ranging from 574 to 1,202 m above sea level.

Collection localities include Koedoesvlei in the Western Soutpansberg, Goro Game Ranch near Vivo, Vyeboom Village, Ndengeza Village, Voortrekkerspos, and Bitterfontein.

== Habitat and ecology ==
Flat-bellied ground spiders are nocturnal hunters that make silk sacs under stones and surface debris where they live during the day, while moulting and during prolonged periods of inactivity. The species has been sampled from the Savanna and Succulent Karoo biomes.

== Conservation ==
Zelotes namaquus is listed as Least Concern by the South African National Biodiversity Institute. Although the species is presently known only from one sex, it occurs in a part of the country where extensive areas of natural habitat remain. It is also likely to be under collected. There are no significant threats to the species. More sampling is needed to collect the female and determine the species' range more accurately.

== Taxonomy ==
The species was described by FitzPatrick in 2007 from Bitterfontein in the Northern Cape. The species is known only from the male.
