= Kliprand =

- Location within Western Cape Location within South Africa
- Coordinates: 30.595°S 18.688°E
- Country: South Africa
- Province: Western Cape
- District: West Coast
- Municipality: Matzikama

Area
  - Total: 0.96 km^{2} (0.37 sq mi)

Population (2011)
  - Total: 205
  - Density: 210/km^{2} (550/sq mi)

Racial makeup (2011)
  - Black African: 87.8%
  - Coloured: 9.3%
  - White: 2.9%

First languages (2011)
  - Afrikaans: 97.1%
  - Sign language: 2.0%
  - Other: 1.0%
- Time zone: UTC+2 (SAST)
- PO box: 8205
- Area code: 027

Kliprand is a town in West Coast District Municipality in the Western Cape province of South Africa. It is the setting for the book October by Zoë Wicomb.
