= Babiana longicollis =

Conservation status
- Least Concern (IUCN 3.1)

Scientific classification
- Kingdom: Plantae
- Clade: Tracheophytes
- Clade: Angiosperms
- Clade: Monocots
- Order: Asparagales
- Family: Iridaceae
- Genus: Babiana
- Species: B. longicollis

Binomial name
- Babiana longicollis Dinter

Species of flowering plant

Babiana longicollis is a geophytic plant species of 10–15 cm (3.9–5.9 in) tall in the family Iridaceae. It has laterally flattened, pleated, almost hairless leaves and 3-5 mirror-symmetrical, greenish to purple flowers, that open between late June and early August and smell like sweet peas. It is endemic to southwestern Namibia. It is called Namib baboon root in English and Namib bobbejaantjie in Afrikaans.

== Description ==
The Namib baboon root is a plant of 10-15 cm tall, that survives the dry, hot summer through its underground corms, and appears above ground in the late autumn. Seedlings have line-shaped leaves, while flowering plants have several variably pleated leaves that are lance- to swordshaped, 6–10 cm (2.4–3.9 in) long and 0.4–1.0 cm (0.16–0.39 in) wide, slightly twisting in the upper half, almost hairless except for few, scattered soft hairs along the rim, and sometimes the tip is recurved. The three to five flowers are set in a dense spike that lies on the ground but rises towards its tip. Each individual flower is subtended by two bracts of 18–25 mm (0.71–0.98 in) long, that are initially green but later turn auburn, dotted near the gradually pointed tips, the inner bract slightly longer that the outer and forked at the tip with dry brown tips. The flowers smell like sweet peas. The six tepals that make up the mirror-symmetrical perianth are merged into a tube of about 3¼-4½ cm long, but split into unequal, greenish to greyish mauve or purple segments. The segment near the stem (the dorsal tepal) is 2-3 cm long and 1½-2 cm wide, while the three lower tepals are merged somewhat further, are about 1½ cm wide and marked with white or light yellow stripes. The three stamens are clustered under the dorsal tepal and consist of arching filaments of about 1 cm long topped by 5-6 mm long anthers. The hairless ovary is topped by a style that divides in three branches opposite the base of the anthers. Plants flower late June and July, sometimes into August.

=== Differences with related species ===
The Namib baboon root is much alike the Namaqua baboon root (Babiana namaquensis) but can be distinguished by the longer perianth tube of 3¼-4½ cm long (2½-2¾ cm in B. namaquensis) and the style branching opposite the base of the anthers (opposite the tip of the anthers in B. namaquensis). The flowers are greenish, greyish mauve to purple, some of which may be confused with the white to pale mauve of B. namaquensis.

== Taxonomy ==
Namib baboon root was first desxribed by Kurt Dinter in a scientific journal called Feddes Repertorium in 1931 based on a collection he made himself in the Klinghardt Mountains in Namibia back in 1922.

== Distribution, ecology and conservation ==
The Namib baboon root grows in crevices on outcrops of granite in succulent steppe from Rosh Pinah to the Klinghardt Mountains in Namibia. It is considered rare in Namibia because it is known from only few locations, but it is not currently threatened by any particular development.
