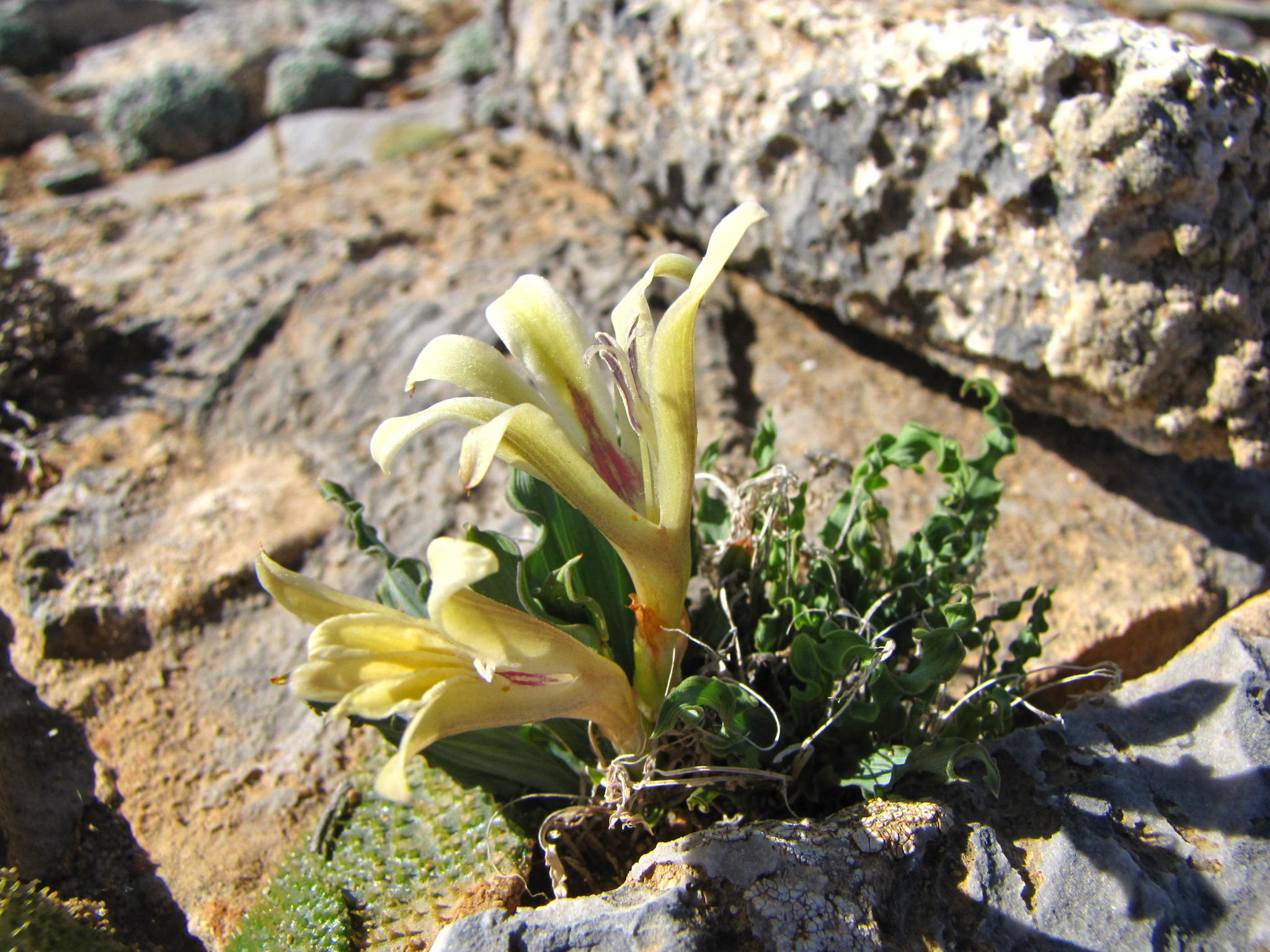

Scientific classification
- Kingdom: Plantae
- Clade: Tracheophytes
- Clade: Angiosperms
- Clade: Monocots
- Order: Asparagales
- Family: Iridaceae
- Genus: Babiana
- Species: B. cinnamomea

Binomial name
- Babiana cinnamomea J.C.Manning & Goldblatt

= Babiana cinnamomea =

Species of flowering plant

Babiana cinnamomea is a perennial plant of about 4–6 cm (1.6–2.4 in) high that annually forms leaves and flowers from an underground corm that is assigned to the iris family. It has inconspicuous pale greenish yellow flowers and broad, hairless, pleated leaves with undulating margins. Flowers may be found in May and June. It occurs in the very north of the Western Cape province of South Africa.

== Description ==
Babiana cinnamomea is a geophyte with an underground corm from which during autumn the leaves and flowers appear above the ground, forming a plant of about 4–6 cm (1.6–2.4 in) high. The stem is completely underground, unbranched and hairless. The leaf blades are pleated, hairless, broadly oval in circumference, 3–4 cm (1.2–1.6 in) long and 2—2 1/2 cm (0.8—1.0 in) wide, and have a crinkled margin sit with papillae. The blade sits at an almost right angle atop a sheath that envelops the sheaths of higher leaves. Immature corms however carry slender, line-shaped leaves with few long soft hairs.

The flowers have a strong, sweet, spicy scent reminiscent of cloves or cinnamon and sit with two to six together in a spike with an upturning tip. Each flower is subtended by two bracts that are green at the base but become translucently straw-coloured with very small brown spots and dry towards the tip. The outer is 17–19 mm (0.67–0.75 in) long and the inner is longer at 20–25 mm (0.79–0.98 in), which is uncommon in Babiana. The inner bract is forked at the tip only. The base colour of the mirror-symmetrical perianth is pale yellow, variably marked with mauve. The six tepals are merged into a funnel-shaped tube of 22–25 mm (0.87–0.98 in) long that is hollow all the way to the base and splits into six unequal perianth lobes towards the top. The dorsal tepals are about 30 mm (1.2 in) long and 6–8 mm (0.24–0.31 in) wide. The upper lateral tepals and the lower petals are joint for about 6 mm further up and together form a lower lip. The lower tepals are about 20 mm (0.79 in) long and the lower lateral tepals are adorned with a white or cream-coloured blotch. The three stamens are crowded, pressed against the dorsal tepal, and each consist of an approximately 15 mm (0.59 in) long filament that carries an anther of 7–8 mm (0.28–0.31 in) long. Below the perianth tube sits an ovary that is hairless. From the ovary the style emerges, which splits into three branches of about 3 1/2 mm (0.14 in) long at the same height as the tip of the anthers. This species flowers in May and June.

== Taxonomy and naming ==
This species was first described by John Charles Manning and Peter Goldblatt in 2007, based on specimens collected by Manning in 2002. So far, no synonyms have been recorded. The authors do not explain the choice of the species name cinnamomea, but mention the flowers have a strong spicy scent that makes you think of cinnamon and cloves.

== Distribution, ecology and conservation ==
Babiana cinnamomea can be found in the Western Cape province of South Africa between Vanrhynsdorp in the south and the Langeberg north-west of Loeriesfontein. It grows at the base of mountains in rocky crevices in the Succulent Karoo biome, where it is apparently restricted to granite. Its pollinators have not been observed, but the combination of drab coloured flowers and spicy scent also occurs in Gladiolus liliaceus, which is visited by moths. It is from a remote, poorly explored area and was described relatively recently. It is known from six subpopulations that are scattered over a wide area. It is not threatened and therefore has been classified as a rare species.
