= Mathilda Bains =

South African politician and educator (1957–2025)

Permanent Delegate to the National Council of Provinces from the Western Cape
- In office 15 June 2024 – 27 August 2025

Personal details
- Born: 25 October 1957
- Died: 27 August 2025 (aged 67) Kuils River, Cape Town, Western Cape, South Africa
- Party: African National Congress
- Profession: Educator, politician

Mathilda Michelle Bains (25 October 1957 – 27 August 2025) was a South African politician and educator who served as a Permanent Delegate to the National Council of Provinces from the Western Cape from 2024 until her death in 2025. Bains was a member of the African National Congress.

== Early life and career ==
Bains was born on 25 October 1957. She started her career as a teacher at Niewoudt Primary School in January 1978. She left the profession in 1995 and later worked as the regional coordinator in the Department of Social Development in Vredendal on the West Coast.

In a by-election in December 2018, she was elected as the ward councillor for ward 6 in the Matzikama Local Municipality for the African National Congress, gaining the seat from the Democratic Alliance. She went on to later serve as mayor of the municipality during her time on the council. She was not elected to the council in the 2021 local government elections.

Bains was elected onto the Western Cape Provincial Executive Committee of the African National Congress at the party's provincial conference in June 2023.

Following the murder of 13-year-old Jerobejin van Wyk in Klawer, in December 2022, Bains, in her capacity as a community leader, acted as the spokesperson to Jerobejin's mother, Triesa van Wyk.

== Parliamentary career ==
Bains stood as an ANC parliamentary candidate for the National Assembly from the Western Cape in the 2024 national and provincial elections. She was not elected to the National Assembly, however, the ANC designated her to represent the party in the National Council of Provinces, the upper house of the South African parliament.

=== Committee assignments ===
- Select Committee on Education, Sciences and Creative Industries
- Select Committee on Social Services

== Death ==
Bains died at the Netcare Kuils River Hospital in Kuils River outside Cape Town on 27 August 2025. She was 68.
