= Phiambolia persistens =

Scientific classification
- Kingdom: Plantae
- Clade: Tracheophytes
- Clade: Angiosperms
- Clade: Eudicots
- Order: Caryophyllales
- Family: Aizoaceae
- Genus: Phiambolia
- Species: P. persistens

Binomial name
- Phiambolia persistens (L.Bolus) Klak

Synonyms
- Lampranthus persistens (L.Bolus) L.Bolus; Mesembryanthemum persistens L.Bolus

Species of succulent

Phiambolia persistens is a small succulent plant that is part of the Aizoaceae family. The species is endemic to the Northern Cape and the Western Cape.
