= October (novel) =

2014 novel by Zoë Wicomb

- Author: Zoë Wicomb
- Language: English
- Published: 2014 (The New Press)
- Pages: 239 (first edition, hardback)
- ISBN: 978-1-59558-962-0 (first edition, hardback)
- Dewey Decimal: 823'914--dc23
- LC Class: PR9369.3.W53)28

October is a 2014 novel by Zoë Wicomb. Wicomb, who won a 2013 Windham–Campbell Literature Prize, is originally from Namaqualand, South Africa, and is an emeritus professor at the University of Strathclyde.

October is the story of Mercia Murray, a professor in Glasgow, Scotland, who returns to Kliprand, Namaqualand in South Africa when her brother, Jake, writes her to come home and get his son, Nicky. The themes include homemaking, exile, return and race. Quadrapheme: 21st Century Literature has noted that October is a story about homecoming, a story about home, a story about belonging, not-belonging, women and children, class and race and education, motherhood and fatherhood.

Asked by Anna James to sum up the book in three words, Zoë Wicomb answered, "Home, deracination, family secrets."

== Characters ==
- Mercia Murray – also known as Mercy, a Glasgow university professor originally from Kliprand, Namaqualand, in South Africa who returns to Kliprand, to help her brother and his family. At the book's beginning she has been "left" by her partner of 25 years.
- Jacques "Jake" Theophilus Murray – younger brother to Mercia. Lives in Kliprand, Namaqualand in South Africa with his wife and son.
- Sylvie Murray, née Willemse – wife to Jake and mother to Nicky.
- Willem Nicholas "Nicky" Murray – son of Jake and Sylvie.
- Nicholas Murray – known as Meester, father of Mercia and Jake. Husband to Antoinette.
- Antoinette Murray née Malherbe known as Netty, raised at Elim, a Moravian missionary station. Wife to Nicholas, mother of Mercia and Jake.
- Auntie Ma Willemse – one of Sylvie's mothers.
- Ouise Willemse – one of Sylvie's mothers.
- Nana Willemse – one of Sylvie's mothers.
- Fanus Lategan – friend to Mercia during school; collaborator in ANC activities in the mid-1970s in Kliprand.
- Craig McMillan – poet and former partner of Mercia Murray.
- Smithy – a younger colleague of Mercia's at the university.

== Reception ==
Allan Massie, Fellow of the Royal Society of Literature, wrote in The Scotsman: "Zoë Wicomb's latest novel is dense and demanding, but rewarding. It calls for careful reading, as it moves back and forward in time, and to and fro between Scotland and South Africa." Kirkus Reviews commented: "Though the setup is dramatic, Wicomb's writing is patient and meditative [...] its closing pages are genuinely affecting, intensifying the overall mood of heartbreak. A carefully crafted, if at times overly austere, study of home and loss."
