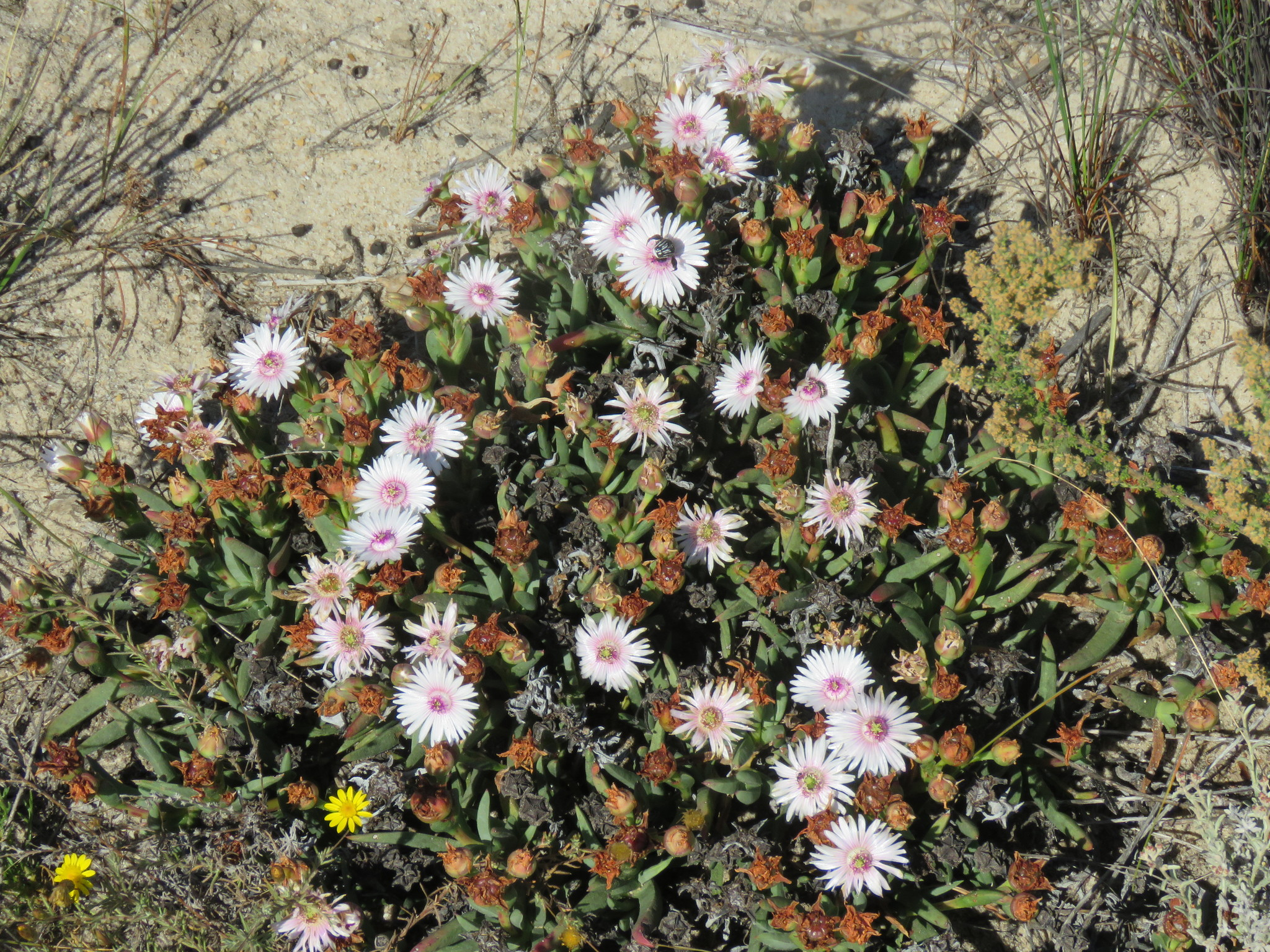

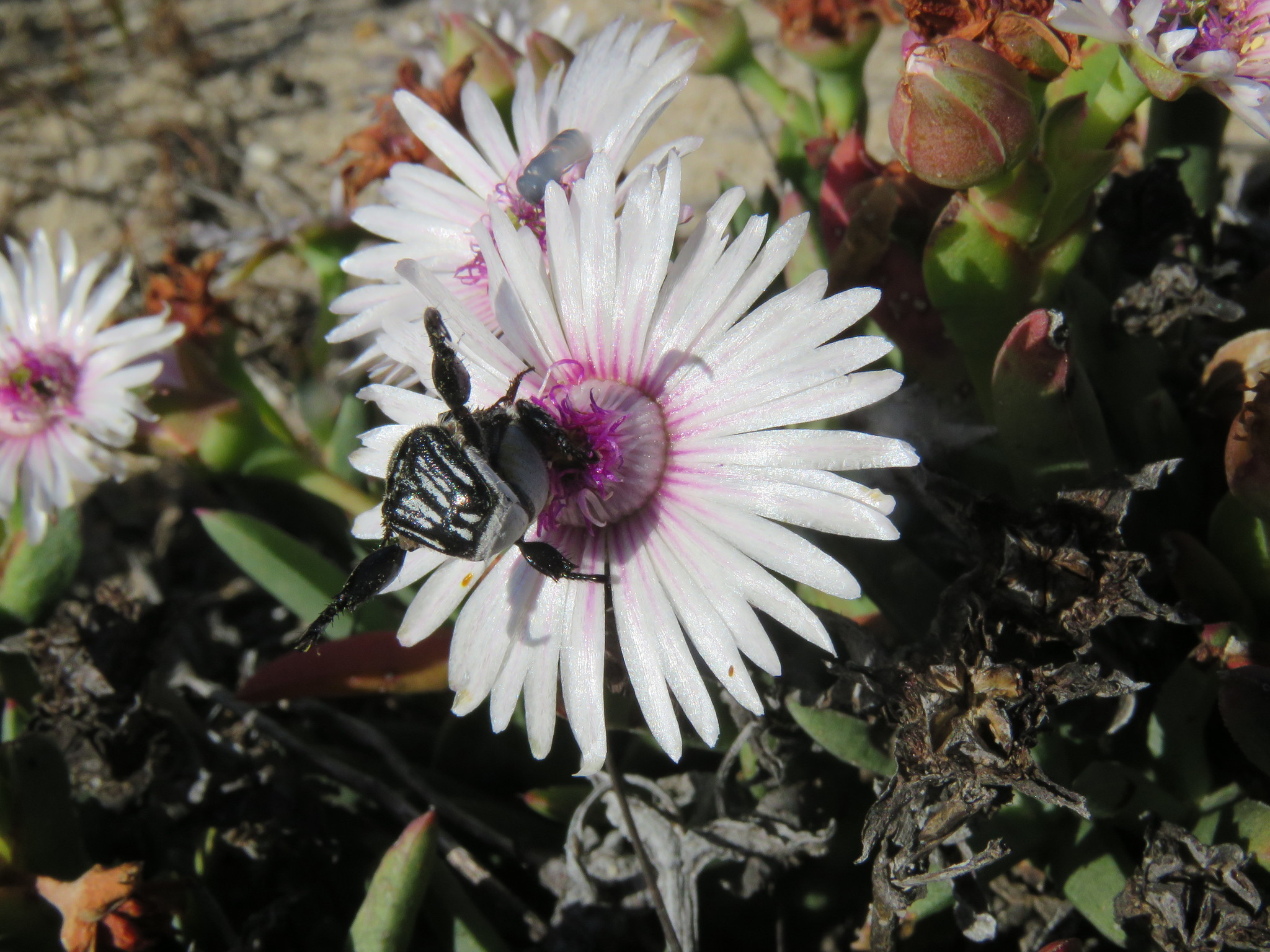

Scientific classification
- Kingdom: Plantae
- Clade: Tracheophytes
- Clade: Angiosperms
- Clade: Eudicots
- Order: Caryophyllales
- Family: Aizoaceae
- Genus: Phiambolia
- Species: P. gydouwensis

Binomial name
- Phiambolia gydouwensis (L.Bolus) Klak

Synonyms
- Mesembryanthemum uncum var. gydouwense L.Bolus

= Phiambolia gydouwensis =

Species of succulent

Phiambolia gydouwensis is a small succulent plant that is part of the Aizoaceae family. The species is endemic to the Western Cape.
