= You Can't Get Lost in Cape Town =

1987 book by Zoë Wicomb

- First edition
- Author: Zoë Wicomb
- Language: English
- Publisher: Virago (first edition)
- Publication date: 1987
- Publication place: United Kingdom

You Can't Get Lost in Cape Town was the first book by Zoë Wicomb. Published in 1987 (by Virago in London), it was a collection of inter-related short stories, set during the Apartheid era and partly autobiographical, the central character being a young Coloured woman growing up in South Africa, speaking English in an Afrikaans-speaking community in Namaqualand, attending the University of the Western Cape, leaving for England, and authoring a collection of short stories. This work has been compared to V. S. Naipaul’s The Enigma of Arrival (1987). As Rob Gaylard notes, "Central to Wicomb's collection of stories is the question of identity, and intimately bound up with this are the polarities of home and exile. Significantly, the stories were written while Wicomb was in exile in England."

You Can’t Get Lost in Cape Town was also published in the US in 1987 by Pantheon Books, and in 2000 by The Feminist Press at CUNY. The book was translated into Italian by Maria Teresa Carbone as Cenere Sulla Mia Manica (Rome: Edizioni Lavoro, 1993), with an Introduction by Dorothy Driver, who suggests that Wicomb's stories are without precedent, that no one previously had written from the particular perspective a woman brought up "Coloured" in South Africa.

== Critical appraisal ==
Gaylard sees the stories collectively as a kind of bildungsroman, noting that "...while Wicomb's work has obvious affinities with that of Bessie Head and Arthur Nortjé (whose poetry supplies two of the epigraphs for her collection), her stories may also gain by being viewed in the wider context of postcolonial writing. Comparison with the work of recent women writers from the Caribbean may be particularly rewarding: writers like Jamaica Kincaid and Michelle Cliff share a preoccuption with the problems of a mixed or hybridized identity; they often write about home from the perspective of exile and often appropriate first-person narrative forms in order to do so."

According to the Wall Street Journal review, "Wicomb deserves a wide American audience, on a part with Nadine Gordimer and J. M. Coetzee", while the Seattle Times stated: "Wicomb is a gifted writer, and her compressed narratives work like brilliant splinters in the mind, suggesting a rich rhythm and shape."

Describing the book as "superb", Bharati Mukherjee wrote in her New York Times review: "Ms. Wicomb's subject isn't – as American readers might expect - simple apartheid. It is the desperate search of the coloured for identity in a harshly hierarchical society. In this acceptance of apartheid and the desire to see beyond it, Ms. Wicomb follows Faulkner and certainly echoes her black countryman Njabulo Ndebele, who (in his recent collection, Fools and Other Stories) wrote: 'Our literature ought to seek to move away from an easy preoccupation with demonstrating the obvious existence of oppression. It exists. The task is to explore how and why people can survive under such harsh conditions.' ... Ms. Wicomb's prose is vigorous, textured, lyrical.... This is a sophisticated storyteller who combines the open-endedness of contemporary fiction with the force of autobiography and the simplicity of family stories."

== Editions ==
- 1987: Virago Press, ISBN 978-0860688204
- 1987: Pantheon Books, ISBN 978-0394753096
- 2000: The Feminist Press, ISBN 978-1558612259
