= Phiambolia unca =

Scientific classification
- Kingdom: Plantae
- Clade: Tracheophytes
- Clade: Angiosperms
- Clade: Eudicots
- Order: Caryophyllales
- Family: Aizoaceae
- Genus: Phiambolia
- Species: P. unca

Binomial name
- Phiambolia unca (L.Bolus) Klak

Synonyms
- Lampranthus uncus (L.Bolus) Schwantes; Mesembryanthemum uncum L.Bolus; Ruschia unca (L.Bolus) L.Bolus

Species of succulent

Phiambolia unca is a small succulent plant that is part of the Aizoaceae family. The species is endemic to the Northern Cape.
