= Phiambolia mentiens =

Scientific classification
- Kingdom: Plantae
- Clade: Tracheophytes
- Clade: Angiosperms
- Clade: Eudicots
- Order: Caryophyllales
- Family: Aizoaceae
- Genus: Phiambolia
- Species: P. mentiens

Binomial name
- Phiambolia mentiens Klak

Species of succulent

Phiambolia mentiens is a small succulent plant that is part of the Aizoaceae family. The species is endemic to the Western Cape.
