= Phiambolia francisci =

Scientific classification
- Kingdom: Plantae
- Clade: Tracheophytes
- Clade: Angiosperms
- Clade: Eudicots
- Order: Caryophyllales
- Family: Aizoaceae
- Genus: Phiambolia
- Species: P. francisci

Binomial name
- Phiambolia francisci (L.Bolus) Klak

Synonyms
- Lampranthus francisci L.Bolus

Species of succulent

Phiambolia francisci is a small succulent plant that is part of the Aizoaceae family. The species is endemic to the Western Cape and occurs from Ceres to the Cederberg. The species has a range of 450 km^{2} and is part of the fynbos. The plant is considered rare.
