= Piekenierskloof Pass =

- Elevation: 519 m (1,703 ft)
- Traversed by: N7

Third Approach
- Location: Citrusdal, South Africa
- Range: Olifants River Mountains

Piekenierskloof Pass is a mountain pass that is part of the N7 national road, running south of Citrusdal in the mountains west of the Olifants River in Western Cape, South Africa.

== History ==
The first known route through the pass as a bridle path was in 1660. Jan Dankaert crossed the pass with the help of Khoi who showed him the route. His expedition was followed in 1662 by Pieter Cruythoff using oxen and wagon. The name came from the pikemen (lancers equipped with pikes) posted in the area by the Dutch East India Company to protect farmers from Khoikhoi raids. A farm was established near the pass and was called Piquinier's Kloof.

Thomas Charles John Bain built the first road there in 1858, a gravel route and was named Grey's Pass after the governor of the Cape Colony, Sir George Grey. He started in February 1857 on the western approach with 220 convicts, ignoring the existing route at the time through the pass. The western approach opened at the end of 1857 and by July 1858, the pass was completed. It was officially opened on 17 November 1858.

In 1939, a decision was made to build a new road over the pass. World War Two ended the construction and planning and building resumed in 1957 with the existing route completed in 1958 and renamed the Piekenierskloof Pass.

== Route ==
The pass peaks at 519 m above sea level and has a maximum grade of 1:16.

== See also ==
- List of mountain passes of South Africa

== Sources ==
- Standard Encyclopaedia of Southern Africa, vol 8. Cape Town: Nasou, 1973. ISBN 0-625-00324-1
