= Lutzville =

- Location within Western Cape Location within South Africa
- Coordinates: 31°33′S 18°21′E
- Country: South Africa
- Province: Western Cape
- District: West Coast
- Municipality: Matzikama

Area
  - Total: 1.65 km^{2} (0.64 sq mi)

Population (2011)
  - Total: 1,108
  - Density: 672/km^{2} (1,740/sq mi)

Racial makeup (2011)
  - Black African: 11.4%
  - Coloured: 25.2%
  - Indian/Asian: 0.9%
  - White: 62.1%
  - Other: 0.4%

First languages (2011)
  - Afrikaans: 92.3%
  - English: 3.5%
  - Tswana: 1.1%
  - Other: 2.6%
- Time zone: UTC+2 (SAST)
- Postal code (street): 8165
- PO box: 8165
- Area code: 027

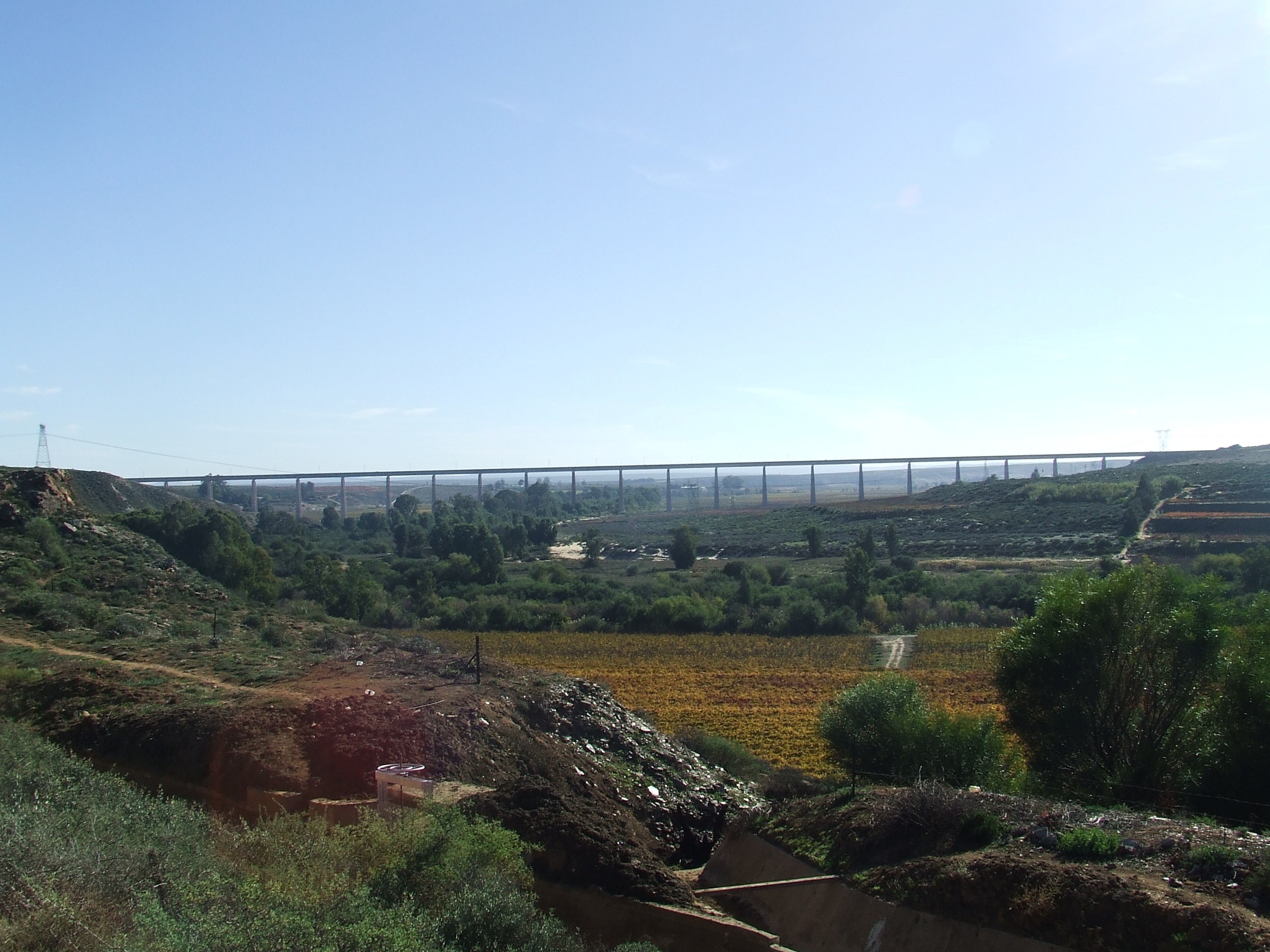

Lutzville is a settlement in West Coast District Municipality in the Western Cape province of South Africa. It falls under the Matzikama Local Municipality.

Village 22 km north-west of Vredendal and 45 km west of Vanrhynsdorp. Established in August 1923 as Vlermuisklip, but later (~1950) renamed after its founder, Johan J Lutz.

Lutzville is located next to the Olifants River and at high tide it is possible to navigate in a flat-bottomed boat to Papendorp, about 30 km downstream near the river's mouth.
