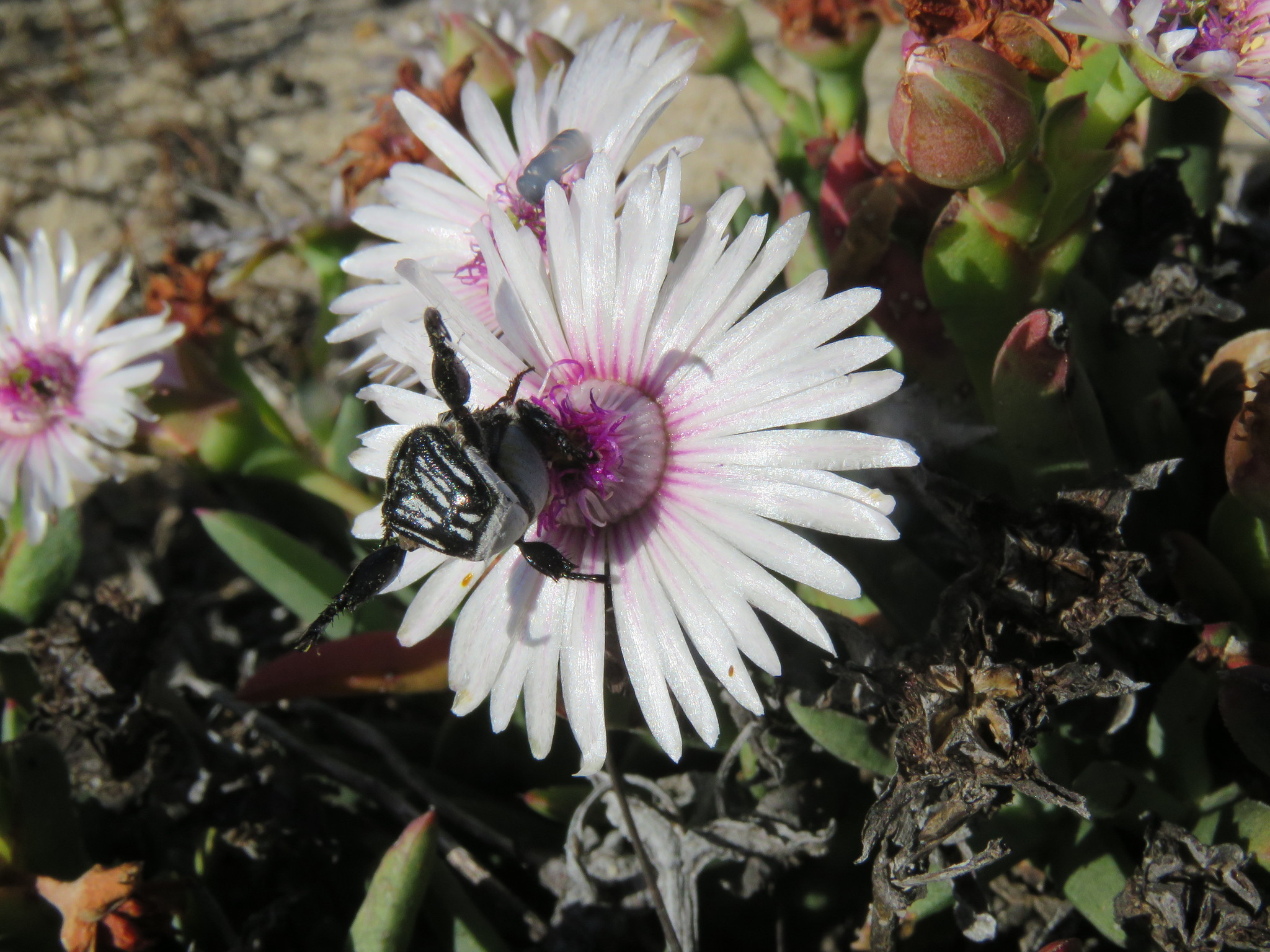
- Phiambolia gydouwensis

Scientific classification
- Kingdom: Plantae
- Clade: Tracheophytes
- Clade: Angiosperms
- Clade: Eudicots
- Order: Caryophyllales
- Family: Aizoaceae
- Subfamily: Ruschioideae
- Tribe: Ruschieae
- Genus: Phiambolia; Klak

= Phiambolia =

Genus of plants

Phiambolia is a genus of flowering plants belonging to the family Aizoaceae. It is native to the Cape Provinces of South Africa.

== Species ==
Eleven species are accepted:

- Phiambolia francisci (L.Bolus) Klak
- Phiambolia gydouwensis (L.Bolus) Klak
- Phiambolia hallii (L.Bolus) Klak
- Phiambolia incumbens (L.Bolus) Klak
- Phiambolia littlewoodii (L.Bolus) Klak
- Phiambolia longifolia Klak
- Phiambolia mentiens Klak
- Phiambolia persistens (L.Bolus) Klak
- Phiambolia similis Klak
- Phiambolia stayneri (L.Bolus ex Toelken & Jessop) Klak
- Phiambolia unca (L.Bolus) Klak
