= Phiambolia littlewoodii =

Scientific classification
- Kingdom: Plantae
- Clade: Tracheophytes
- Clade: Angiosperms
- Clade: Eudicots
- Order: Caryophyllales
- Family: Aizoaceae
- Genus: Phiambolia
- Species: P. littlewoodii

Binomial name
- Phiambolia littlewoodii (L.Bolus) Klak

Synonyms
- Ruschia littlewoodii L.Bolus

Species of succulent

Phiambolia littlewoodii is a small succulent plant belonging to the Aizoaceae family. The species is endemic to the Western Cape and occurs from the Swartruggensberge to the Keeromsberg. The plant has a range of 288 km^{2} and eight subpopulations are known. The species is cultivated from its habitat.
