= Phiambolia stayneri =

Scientific classification
- Kingdom: Plantae
- Clade: Tracheophytes
- Clade: Angiosperms
- Clade: Eudicots
- Order: Caryophyllales
- Family: Aizoaceae
- Genus: Phiambolia
- Species: P. stayneri

Binomial name
- Phiambolia stayneri (L.Bolus ex Toelken & Jessop) Klak

Synonyms
- Amphibolia stayneri L.Bolus ex Toelken & Jessop; Lampranthus dissimilis (G.D.Rowley) H.E.K.Hartmann; Ruschia dissimilis G.D.Rowley

Species of succulent

Phiambolia stayneri is a small succulent plant that is part of the Aizoaceae family. The species is endemic to the Northern Cape.
