= Phiambolia hallii =

Scientific classification
- Kingdom: Plantae
- Clade: Tracheophytes
- Clade: Angiosperms
- Clade: Eudicots
- Order: Caryophyllales
- Family: Aizoaceae
- Genus: Phiambolia
- Species: P. hallii

Binomial name
- Phiambolia hallii (L.Bolus) Klak

Synonyms
- Lampranthus francisci L.Bolus

Species of succulent

Phiambolia hallii is a small succulent plant that is part of the Aizoaceae family. The species is endemic to the Western Cape and occurs from Karoopoort to Katbakkies Pass as well as the Cederberg. There are five known subpopulations and the plant is part of the fynbos. The species is considered rare.
