= Zoë Wicomb =

South African author (1948–2025)

- Born: Zoë Charlotte Wicomb; 23 November 1948; Beeswater, Western Cape, South Africa
- Died: 13 October 2025 (aged 76); Glasgow, Scotland
- Education: University of the Western Cape; Reading University
- Occupations: Writer; academic
- Notable work: You Can't Get Lost in Cape Town (1987)
- Awards: M-Net Prize (2001); Windham–Campbell Literature Prize (2013)

Zoë Charlotte Wicomb (23 November 1948 – 13 October 2025) was a South African author and academic who lived in the United Kingdom from the 1970s until her death. Her 1987 debut book, You Can't Get Lost in Cape Town – a collection of inter-related short stories, set during the Apartheid era and partly autobiographical – received wide praise, and in 2000 was described by Toni Morrison as "seductive, brilliant and precious".

In 2013, Wicomb was awarded the inaugural Windham–Campbell Literature Prize for her fiction.

== Background ==
Zoë Charlotte Wicomb was born in Beeswater, Western Cape, on 23 November 1948. Growing up in small-town Namaqualand, she went to Cape Town for high school, and attended the University of the Western Cape (which was established in 1960 as a university for "Coloureds").

After graduating, she left South Africa in 1970 for England, where she continued her studies at Reading University. She lived in Nottingham and Glasgow and returned to South Africa in 1990, where she taught for three years in the department of English at the University of the Western Cape.

In 1994, she moved to Glasgow, Scotland, where she was Professor in English Studies at the University of Strathclyde until her retirement in 2009. She was Professor Extraordinaire at Stellenbosch University from 2005 to 2011. She was also Emeritus Professor at the University of Strathclyde.

Wicomb died from a pulmonary embolism at a hospital in Glasgow, Scotland, on 13 October 2025, at the age of 76.

== Career ==
Wicomb gained attention in South Africa and internationally with her first book, a collection of inter-related short stories, You Can't Get Lost in Cape Town (1987), set during the apartheid era. The central character is a young woman brought up speaking English in an Afrikaans-speaking "coloured" community in Little Namaqualand, attending the University of the Western Cape, leaving for England, and authoring a collection of short stories. This work has been compared to V. S. Naipaul’s The Enigma of Arrival.

Her second work of fiction, the novel David's Story (2000), is set partly in 1991 toward the close of the apartheid era and explores the role of coloureds and women in the military wing of the ANC, and the challenges of adjustment to the realities of the "New South Africa". By presenting the novel as the work of an amanuensis creating a narrative out of the scattered statements of the central character, David Dirkse, Wicomb raises questions about the writing of history in a period of political instability, and by relating the stories of the Griqua people from whom Dirkse is, in part (like Wicomb), descended, it exposes the dangers of ethnic exclusiveness. The novel has been studied as a key work dealing with the transition period in South Africa along with Disgrace (1999) by J. M. Coetzee and Bitter Fruit (2001) by Achmat Dangor.

Playing in the Light, Wicomb's second novel, released in 2006, is set in mid-1990s Cape Town and tells the story of Marion Campbell, the daughter of a coloured couple who succeeded in passing for white, as she comes to learn their painful story and to reassess her own place in the world of post-apartheid South Africa.

Wicomb's second collection of short stories, The One That Got Away (2008), is set mainly in Cape Town and Glasgow and explores a range of human relationships: marriage, friendships, family ties and relations with servants. Many of the stories—which are often linked to one another—deal with South Africans in Scotland or Scots in South Africa.

Her third novel, October, was published in 2015; its central character, Mercia Murray, returns from Glasgow to Namaqualand to visit her brother and his family and to face the question of what "home" means. The novel explicitly evokes its connection with Marilynne Robinson's Home, the title Wicomb also wanted for her work.

Wicomb preferred nonprofit presses for her fiction, such as The Feminist Press and The New Press. Her short stories have been published in many collections, including Colours of a New Day: Writing for South Africa (edited by Sarah LeFanu and Stephen Hayward; Lawrence & Wishart, 1990) and Daughters of Africa (edited by Margaret Busby; Jonathan Cape, 1992).

Wicomb's final novel, Still Life, published in 2020 by The New Press and described as "stunningly original...exploring race, truth in authorship, and the legacy of past exploitation", was selected by The New York Times as one of the ten best historical novels of 2020. Although ostensibly about Thomas Pringle, the so-called Father of South African poetry, the story is told through the prism of characters from the past – West Indian slave, Mary Prince, whose memoir was published by Pringle; Hinza Marossi, Pringle’s adopted Khoesan son; and Sir Nicholas Greene, a character time-travelling from the pages of a book. The novel features the paranormal yet is neither thriller nor mystery; the characters may move in our modern world but their main purpose is to interrogate the past.

Wicomb also published numerous articles of literary and cultural criticism; a selection of these was collected in Race, Nation, Translation: South African essays, 1990–2013 (edited by Andrew van der Vlies; Yale University Press, 2018). Her own fiction was the subject of numerous essays, three special issues of journals (the Journal of Southern African Studies, Current Writing, and Safundi) and a volume edited by Kai Easton and Derek Attridge, entitled Zoë Wicomb & the Translocal: Scotland and South Africa (Routledge, 2017). Wicomb chaired the judges' panel for the 2015 Caine Prize for African Writing.

== Awards and honours ==
Wicomb's work was recognised for a number of prizes, including being shortlisted in 2009 for the Commonwealth Writers' Prize (for The One That Got Away), nominated for the Neustadt International Prize for Literature in 2012, and shortlisted for the Barry Ronge Fiction Prize (for October) in 2015.

- 2001: Winner of the M-Net Prize (for David's Story).
- 2010: Honorary doctorate from the Open University
- 2013: Windham–Campbell Literature Prize. Wicomb's citation states: "Zoë Wicomb's subtle, lively language and beautifully crafted narratives explore the complex entanglements of home, and the continuing challenges of being in the world."
- 2016: Honorary doctorate in literature from the University of Cape Town
- 2022: Honorary doctorate from the University of the Western Cape in recognition of her academic and creative contributions

== Selected bibliography ==
=== Books ===
- You Can't Get Lost in Cape Town. London: Virago Press. 1987. (short stories).
  - Reprints: The Feminist Press, 2000; Umuzi, 2008.
- David's Story, Kwela, 2000; The Feminist Press, 2001 (novel).
- Playing in the Light, Umuzi, 2006; The New Press, 2008, ISBN 978-1595582218 (novel).
- The One That Got Away, Random House-Umuzi, 2008; The New Press, 2009, ISBN 978-1595584571; second edition, Five Leaves Publications, 2011, ISBN 978-1907869044 (short stories).
- October, The New Press, 2014, ISBN 978-1595589620 (novel).
- Race, Nation, Translation: South African essays, 1990–2013 (ed. Andrew van der Vlies), Yale University Press, 2018, ISBN 978-0-30022-617-1, and Wits University Press, 2018, ISBN 978-1-77614-324-5 (essays).
- Still Life, Penguin Random House, South Africa, 2020. ISBN 9781415210536 (novel).

=== Essays and other contributions ===
- "To Hear the Variety of Discourses", in "Current Writing: Text and Reception in South Africa". Volume 2 No 1. 1990. 35–44.
- "Shame and Identity: The Case of the Coloured in South Africa", in Derek Attridge and Rosemary Jolly (eds), Writing South Africa: Literature, Apartheid, and Democracy, 1970–1995 (Cambridge University Press, 1998), 91–107.
- "Setting Intertextuality and the Resurrection of the Postcolonial", Journal of Postcolonial Writing 41(2), November 2005:144–155.
- Wicomb, Zoë (16 December 2013). "Nelson Mandela". The Talk of the Town. Postscript. The New Yorker. Vol. 89, no. 41. p. 27.
