= Strandfontein, Matzikama =

Strandfontein
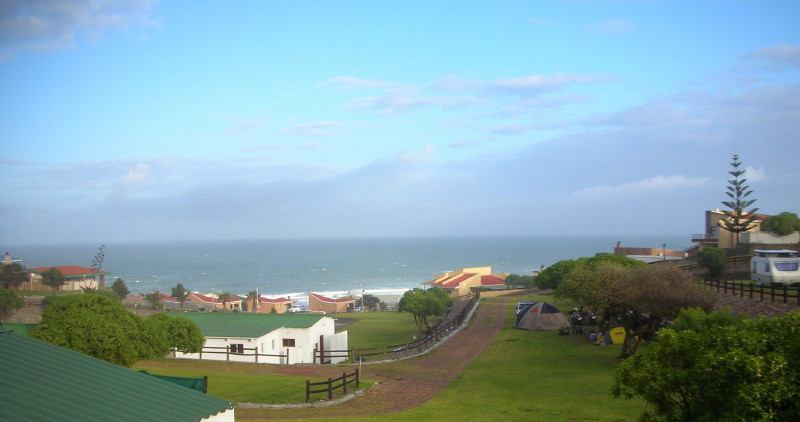
- Strandfontein camp site

- Location within Western Cape Location within South Africa
- Coordinates: 31°45′20″S 18°13′38″E
- Country: South Africa
- Province: Western Cape
- District: West Coast
- Municipality: Matzikama

Area
  - Total: 4.18 km^{2} (1.61 sq mi)

Population (2011)
  - Total: 431
  - Density: 103/km^{2} (267/sq mi)

Racial makeup (2011)
  - Black African: 50.6%
  - Coloured: 14.8%
  - Indian/Asian: 0.9%
  - White: 33.2%
  - Other: 0.5%

First languages (2011)
  - Afrikaans: 69.4%
  - Xhosa: 22.6%
  - English: 3.2%
  - Sotho: 2.7%
  - Other: 2.2%
- Time zone: UTC+2 (SAST)
- Postal code (street): 7798
- PO box: 7788

Strandfontein is a coastal village in the Matzikama Municipality, in the Western Cape province of South Africa. According to the 2011 census it has 431 residents in 92 households. It lies on the Atlantic coast to the south of the mouth of the Olifants River, 300 kilometres (190 mi) north of Cape Town. The name is Afrikaans for "beach spring".
