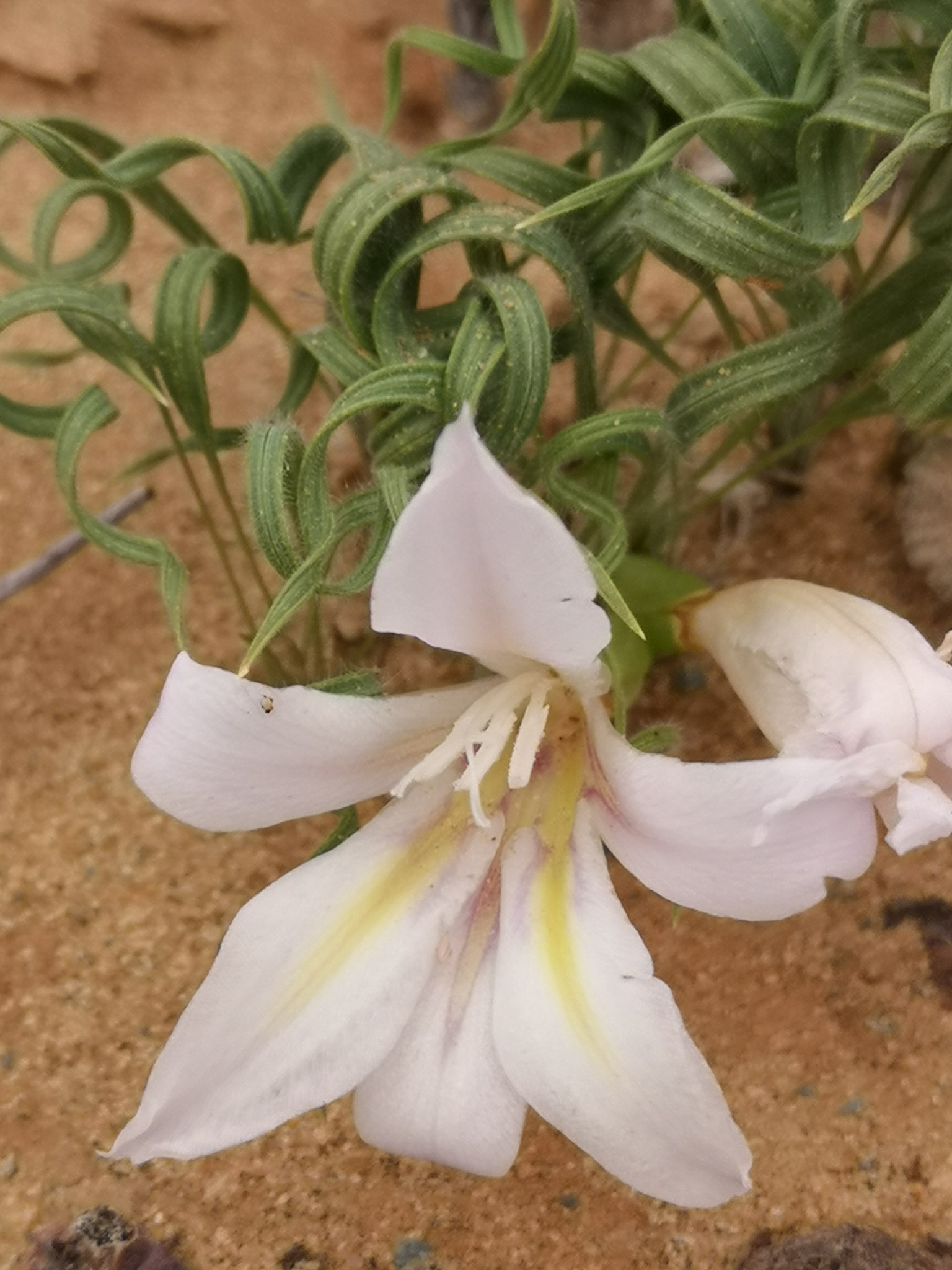

Scientific classification
- Kingdom: Plantae
- Clade: Tracheophytes
- Clade: Angiosperms
- Clade: Monocots
- Order: Asparagales
- Family: Iridaceae
- Genus: Babiana
- Species: B. namaquensis

Binomial name
- Babiana namaquensis Baker, (1892)

Synonyms
- Babiana buchubergensis Dinter

= Babiana namaquensis =

Species of flowering plant

Babiana namaquensis is a perennial flowering plant and geophyte belonging to the genus Babiana. The species is native to the Northern Cape and Namibia. It occurs from southern Namibia to the Anenous Pass in the Richtersveld, in the beach and desert duneveld. The plant has a range of 4779 km². There are five to ten subpopulations and the species is threatened by overgrazing and mining activities. The population numbers are declining.
