= Bitterfontein =

- Location within Western Cape Location within South Africa
- Coordinates: 31°02′10″S 18°15′58″E
- Country: South Africa
- Province: Western Cape
- District: West Coast
- Municipality: Matzikama

Area
  - Total: 39.90 km^{2} (15.41 sq mi)
- Elevation: 355 m (1,165 ft)

Population (2011)
  - Total: 986
  - Density: 24.7/km^{2} (64.0/sq mi)

Racial makeup (2011)
  - Black African: 3.5%
  - Coloured: 91.2%
  - Indian/Asian: 0.4%
  - White: 4.7%
  - Other: 0.2%

First languages (2011)
  - Afrikaans: 97.4%
  - Xhosa: 1.3%
  - Other: 1.2%
- Time zone: UTC+2 (SAST)
- Postal code (street): 8200
- PO box: 8200
- Area code: 027

Bitterfontein is a village in the Hardeveld, the northernmost area of the Western Cape province of South Africa, 320 kilometres (200 mi) north of Cape Town. It is the railhead of a line from Cape Town; ore from the copper mines at Okiep is transferred there from road transport to the railway. It is also located on the N7 (Cape Town–Namibia) national road; the distance from Cape Town is 386 kilometres (240 mi) by road and 465 kilometres (289 mi) by rail.

Bitterfontein is located in the Matzikama Local Municipality, which is part of the West Coast District Municipality. According to the 2001 Census, it had a population of 906 in an area of 1.77 square kilometres (0.68 sq mi). It is served by a police station, a primary school, a library, and a satellite health clinic.

== Trivia ==
- The South African country singer Ruben Lennox wrote a song about Bitterfontein
