= Klawer =

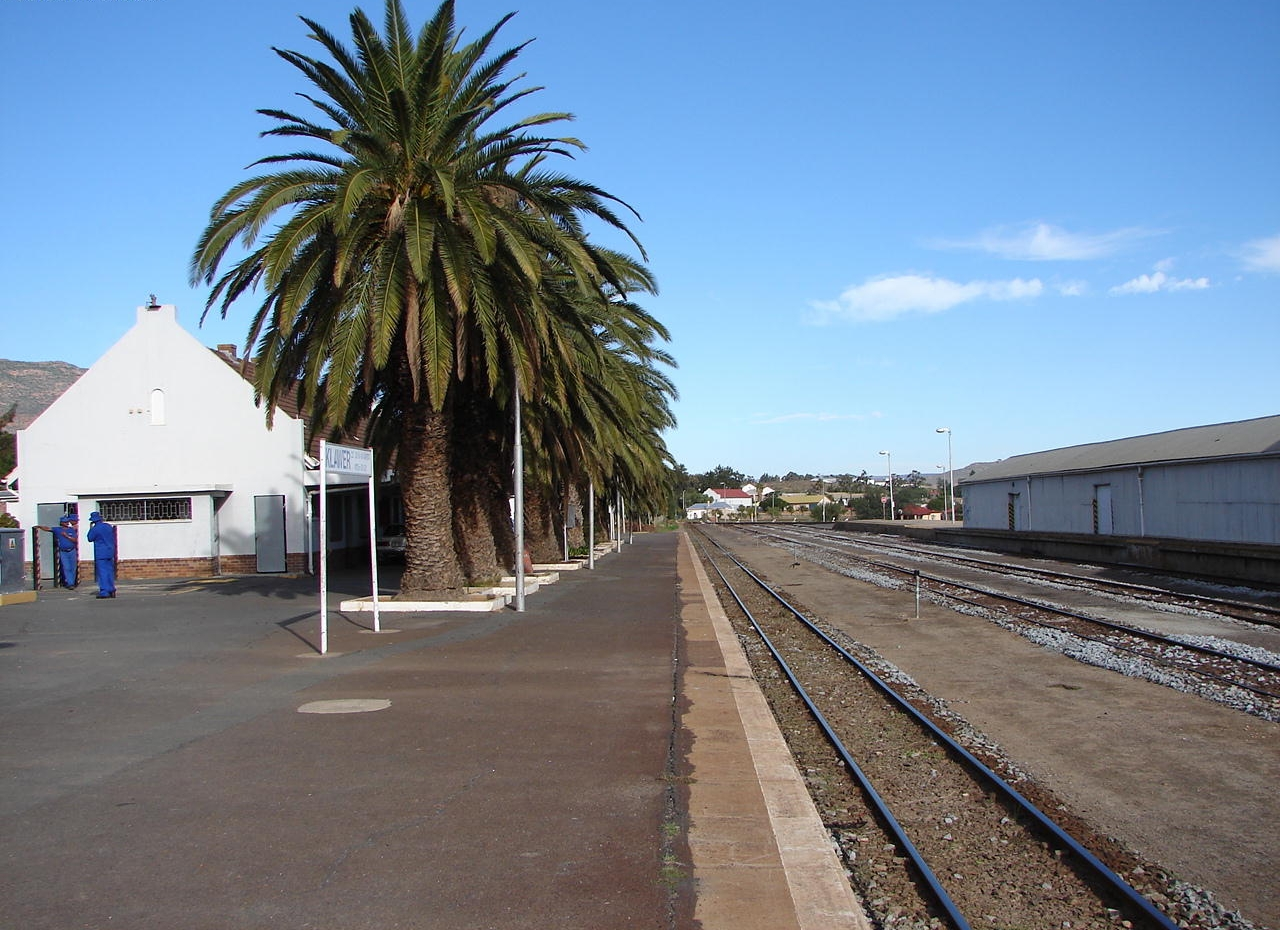
- Klawer railway station

- Location within Western Cape Location within South Africa
- Coordinates: 31°47′S 18°37′E
- Country: South Africa
- Province: Western Cape
- District: West Coast
- Municipality: Matzikama

Area
  - Total: 6.41 km^{2} (2.47 sq mi)

Population (2011)
  - Total: 6,234
  - Density: 973/km^{2} (2,520/sq mi)

Racial makeup (2011)
  - Black African: 9.4%
  - Coloured: 75.3%
  - Indian/Asian: 1.0%
  - White: 13.6%
  - Other: 0.7%

First languages (2011)
  - Afrikaans: 89.2%
  - Xhosa: 4.6%
  - Sign language: 3.1%
  - English: 1.3%
  - Other: 1.8%
- Time zone: UTC+2 (SAST)
- Postal code (street): 8145
- PO box: 8145
- Area code: 027

Klawer is a town in the Matzikama Municipality in the Western Cape province of South Africa. It is situated on the right bank of the Olifants River, 17 kilometres (11 mi) south-east of Vredendal and 240 kilometres (150 mi) north of Cape Town. According to the 2011 census, it has a population of 6,234 people in 1,680 households. The name Klawer comes from the Afrikaans word for a type of wild clover which grows here after the rains.

== Notable people ==
- Mathilda Bains, African National Congress politician and community leader
