= Matzikama Local Municipality =

Matzikama
- Local municipality
- Seal

- Location in the Western Cape

- Topographic map
- Coordinates: 31°15′S 18°30′E
- Country: South Africa
- Province: Western Cape
- District: West Coast
- Seat: Vredendal
- Wards: 8

Government
  - Type: Municipal council
  - Mayor: Monica Bottom (PA)

Area
  - Total: 12,981 km^{2} (5,012 sq mi)

Population (2022)
  - Total: 69,043
  - Density: 5.3188/km^{2} (13.776/sq mi)

Racial makeup (2022)
  - Black African: 10.2%
  - Coloured: 77.7%
  - Indian/Asian: 0.2%
  - White: 11.0%

First languages (2011)
  - Afrikaans: 91.8%
  - Xhosa: 3.5%
  - English: 1.8%
  - Other: 2.9%
- Time zone: UTC+2 (SAST)
- Municipal code: WC011
- Website: www.matzikamamunicipality.co.za#/home

Matzikama Municipality (Afrikaans: Matzikama Munisipaliteit) is a local municipality which governs the northernmost part of the Western Cape province of South Africa, including the towns of Vredendal, Vanrhynsdorp, Klawer and Lutzville, and the surrounding villages and rural areas. As of 2022, it had a population of 69,043. It forms part of the West Coast District Municipality, and its municipality code is WC011.

Matzikama is of Khoekhoe origin, the first people of South Africa. It contains the Khoekhoe language words ma which means "give", tsî which means "you", and ǁgamma which means "water", and loosely translates into "you that give water".

== Geography ==
The municipality covers a total area of 12,981 square kilometres (5,012 sq mi) in the northernmost part of the Western Cape province, stretching from the Atlantic Ocean in the west to the mountains of the Bokkeveld Escarpment in the east. The Olifants River flows through the southern part of the municipal area, while to the north lies the hilly area known as the Knersvlakte. The municipality abuts on the Kamiesberg Municipality to the north, the Hantam Municipality to the east and the Cederberg Municipality to the south.

According to the 2022 South African census, the population was 69,043 people, increasing at an annual rate of 0.27% from 2011. 77.7% identified as "Coloured," 10.2% as "Black African," and 11.0% as "White."

At the 2011 census, the municipality had a population of 67,147 people in 18,835 households. Of this population, 74.7% describe themselves as "Coloured", 14.8% as "White", and 8.5% as "Black African". The first language of 91.8% of the population is Afrikaans, while 3.5% speak Xhosa and 1.8% speak English.

The principal town and seat of the council is Vredendal, which is situated in the valley of the Olifants River and has a population (according to the 2011 census) of 18,170. Other large towns in the municipality are Klawer (pop. 6,234) situated upstream from Vredendal, Lutzville (pop. 5,232) situated downstream from Vredendal, and Vanrhynsdorp (pop. 6,272) to the north-east towards the escarpment. In the Olifants River valley there are also smaller agricultural settlements at Ebenhaeser (pop. 1,305) and Koekenaap (pop. 1,551). South of the mouth of the Olifants River are the coastal villages of Doringbaai (pop. 1,260) and Strandfontein (pop. 431). The villages of Bitterfontein (pop. 986), Kliprand (pop. 205), Nuwerus (pop. 650) and Rietpoort (pop. 970) are situated in the sparsely populated Knersvlakte in the northern part of the municipality.

== History ==
At the end of the apartheid era, in the area that is today Matzikama, there were municipal councils for the towns of Vredendal, Klawer, Lutzville, Vanrhynsdorp and Bitterfontein, and a local council for the villages of Doringbaai and Strandfontein known as the Louis Rood Local Council. These councils were elected by the white residents. The coloured residents of Vredendal, Klawer, Lutzville, Vanrhynsdorp, Koekenaap, Bitterfontein and Nuwerus were governed by management committees subordinate to the white councils. The former mission stations of Ebenhaeser and Rietpoort were governed by management boards, and the remaining rural areas fell under the West Coast Regional Services Council.

While the negotiations to end apartheid were taking place a process was established for local authorities to negotiate voluntary mergers. Several towns in the Matzikama region took part in this process, resulting in each municipal council merging with its corresponding management committee: Klawer in September 1992, Vanrhynsdorp in December 1992, Vredendal in January 1993, and Lutzville in January 1994.

After the national elections of 1994 a process of local government transformation began, in which negotiations were held between the existing local authorities, political parties, and local community organisations. As a result of these negotiations, the existing local authorities were dissolved and transitional local councils (TLCs) were created for each town and village. In total eight TLCs were created.

- The Vanrhynsdorp TLC replaced the (merged) Vanrhynsdorp Municipality in December 1994.
- The Vredendal TLC replaced the (merged) Vredendal Municipality in December 1994.
- The Klawer TLC replaced the (merged) Klawer Municipality in January 1995.
- The Doringbaai/Strandfontein TLC replaced the Louis Rood Local Council in January 1995.
- The Ebenhaeser TLC replaced the Ebenhaeser Management Board in January 1995.
- The Lutzville TLC replaced the (merged) Lutzville Municipality as well as the Koekenaap Management Committee in February 1995.
- The Bitterfontein/Nuwerus TLC replaced the Bitterfontein Municipality, the Bitterfontein Management Committee and the Nuwerus Management Committee in February 1995.
- The Rietpoort TLC replaced the Rietpoort Management Board in May 1995.

The transitional councils were initially made up of members nominated by the various parties to the negotiations, until May 1996 when elections were held. At these elections the West Coast District Council was established, replacing the West Coast Regional Services Council. Transitional representative councils (TRCs) were also elected to represent rural areas outside the TLCs on the District Council; the area that was to become Matzikama was covered by the Vredendal and Vanrhynsdorp TRCs.

At the local elections of December 2000 the TLCs and TRCs were dissolved. The Matzikama Municipality was established, though in 2000 it incorporated only the southern half of the area it governs today. That area included Vredendal, Vanrhynsdorp, Klawer, Lutzville, Ebenhaeser and Doringbaai/Strandfontein. The sparsely populated northern area, including Bitterfontein/Nuwerus and Rietpoort, became a District Management Area of the West Coast District Municipality. In 2011 this area was incorporated into the Matzikama Municipality when District Management Areas were abolished.

== Politics ==
The municipal council consists of fifteen members elected by mixed-member proportional representation. Eight councillors are elected by first-past-the-post voting in eight wards, while the remaining seven are chosen from party lists so that the total number of party representatives is proportional to the number of votes received.

In the election of 4 November 2026 the Democratic Alliance (DA) won a plurality of six seats on the council.

The following table shows the results of the 2026 election.

Party	Ward			List			Total seats
Party	Votes	%	Seats	Votes	%	Seats	Total seats
Democratic Alliance	7,620	42.04	6	7,573	41.88	0	6
Patriotic Alliance	4,504	24.85	2	4,473	24.73	2	4
African National Congress	3,140	17.32	0	3,282	18.15	3	3
Freedom Front Plus	1,254	6.92	0	1,203	6.65	1	1
Economic Freedom Fighters	490	2.70	0	514	2.84	1	1
Independent candidates	20	0.11	0				0
12 other parties	1,097	6.05	0	1,039	5.75	0	0
Total	18,125	100.00	8	18,084	100.00	7	15
Valid votes	18,125	99.09		18,084	99.01		
Invalid/blank votes	166	0.91		180	0.99		
Total votes	18,291	100.00		18,264	100.00		
Registered voters/turnout	36,342	50.33		36,342	50.26		
