= Koekenaap =

- Location within Western Cape Location within South Africa
- Coordinates: 31°31′23″S 18°17′32″E
- Country: South Africa
- Province: Western Cape
- District: West Coast
- Municipality: Matzikama

Area
  - Total: 1.59 km^{2} (0.61 sq mi)

Population (2011)
  - Total: 1,551
  - Density: 975/km^{2} (2,530/sq mi)

Racial makeup (2011)
  - Black African: 12.4%
  - Coloured: 83.8%
  - Indian/Asian: 0.3%
  - White: 3.1%
  - Other: 0.3%

First languages (2011)
  - Afrikaans: 89.3%
  - Xhosa: 5.2%
  - English: 2.2%
  - Other: 3.2%
- Time zone: UTC+2 (SAST)
- PO box: 8146

Koekenaap is a settlement in West Coast District Municipality in the Western Cape province of South Africa.
