= Vredendal =

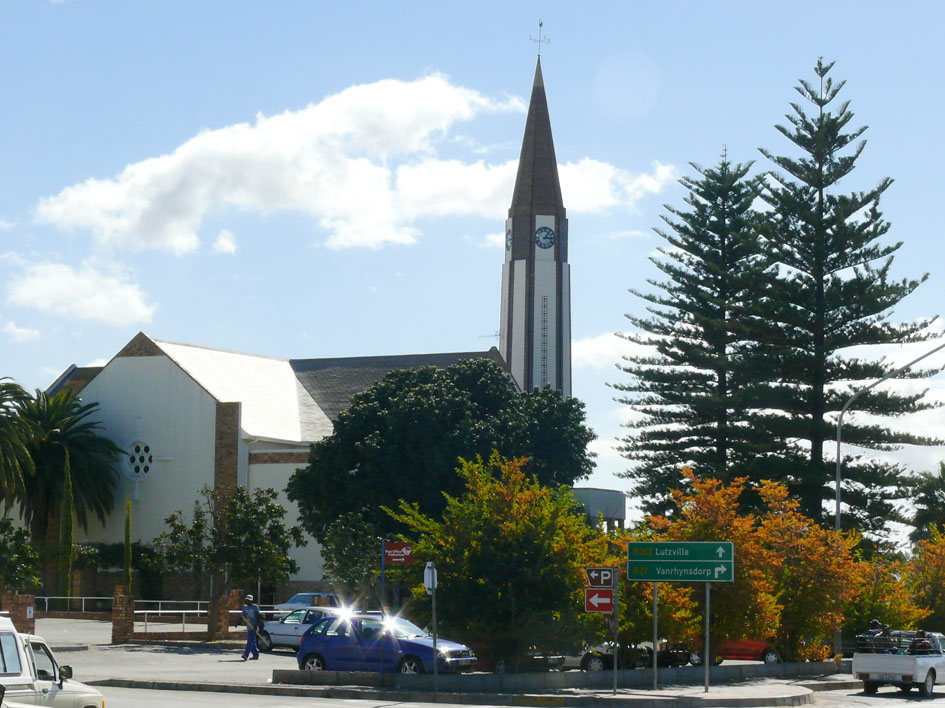
- Vredendal

- Location within Western Cape Location within South Africa Location within Africa
- Coordinates: 31°39′52″S 18°30′22″E
- Country: South Africa
- Province: Western Cape
- District: West Coast
- Municipality: Matzikama

Area
  - Total: 23.08 km^{2} (8.91 sq mi)

Population (2011)
  - Total: 18,170
  - Density: 787.3/km^{2} (2,039/sq mi)

Racial makeup (2011)
  - Black African: 12.3%
  - Coloured: 67.8%
  - Indian/Asian: 0.7%
  - White: 15.7%
  - Other: 3.6%

First languages (2011)
  - Afrikaans: 86.6%
  - Xhosa: 7.5%
  - English: 2.3%
  - Other: 3.6%
- Time zone: UTC+2 (SAST)
- Postal code (street): 8160
- PO box: 8160
- Area code: 027

Vredendal (locally /ˈfrɪərdəndʌl/) is a town in the northern Olifants River Valley in the Western Cape province of South Africa, with a population (according to the 2001 census) of 16,164 people. It lies 250 kilometres (160 mi) north of Cape Town on the banks of the Olifants River at the southern edge of Little Namaqualand.

Vredendal was laid out in 1933 as part of the Olifants River Irrigation Scheme, and attained municipal status in 1963. The name is Dutch and Afrikaans for "valley of peace", and was taken from the name of an old farm.

Vredendal is the administrative and commercial centre of the northern Olifants River Valley and the northern part of the Western Cape province. It is the seat of the Matzikama Local Municipality and of a Vredendal Magistrate's Court. Between 1968 and 2001 it was a major integrated military base housing two SAAF fighter jet squadrons, a ground attack squadron, an Aerial refueling squadron, two airlifting transport squadrons (i.e. the 2nd SAAF Group) attached to 3 Paratrooper Companies, an attack helicopter squadron colocated with an SADF Armoured Battalion and 2 Light Infantry Battalions which formed the 6th SADF Infantry Brigade. It was also the site of the 4 Coastal Artillery Group of the SADF Navy equipped with Surface to Ship Guided Missiles and Anti-Submarine Helicopters.

Vredendal is connected to the N7 national road by the R362 and R363 roads, which run along the north and south banks, respectively, of the Olifants River. Vredendal is also served by the West Coast railway line which runs from Cape Town to Bitterfontein. The travel distance from Cape Town is approximately 300 kilometres (190 mi) by road and 360 kilometres (220 mi) by rail.

It is on the boundary between the Mediterranean climate to the south and the semi-arid climate towards the north. Winters are mild with occasional rainy days. The summers can be warm to very hot and very dry.

In August 2014 the town hit the news headlines when Lionel Phillips, acting director for development and city planning, caused an uproar by requesting the organisers of the Namaqua festival to cancel the performance of the singer Steve Hofmeyr. Hofmeyr responded by stating "There you have it Lionel Phillips: 17 artists, one agency and a whole town without an income for that weekend."

On 27 October 2015, a temperature of 48.4 °C was recorded in Vredendal, the highest global temperature for October that year.

== Notable people ==
- Mathilda Bains (1957–2025), African National Congress politician and former mayor of the Matzikama Local Municipality
