= Nuwerus =

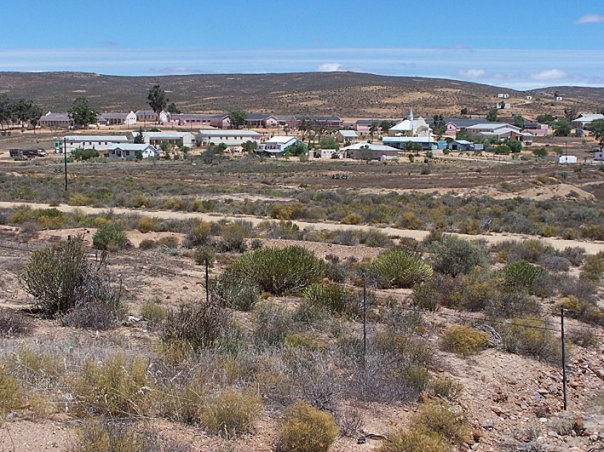
- Nuwerus

- Location within Western Cape Location within South Africa
- Coordinates: 31.149°S 18.358°E
- Country: South Africa
- Province: Western Cape
- District: West Coast
- Municipality: Matzikama

Area
  - Total: 0.75 km^{2} (0.29 sq mi)

Population (2011)
  - Total: 650
  - Density: 870/km^{2} (2,200/sq mi)

Racial makeup (2011)
  - Black African: 7.7%
  - Coloured: 81.3%
  - Indian/Asian: 0.8%
  - White: 9.8%
  - Other: 0.5%

First languages (2011)
  - Afrikaans: 96.4%
  - English: 2.3%
  - Other: 1.3%
- Time zone: UTC+2 (SAST)
- PO box: 8201
- Area code: 027

Nuwerus is a settlement in Matzikama Municipality, West Coast District in the Western Cape province of South Africa.

Village 16 km south-east of Bitterfontein and 70 km north-west of Vanrhynsdorp. The name is Afrikaans and means ‘new rest’.
