= Vanrhynsdorp =

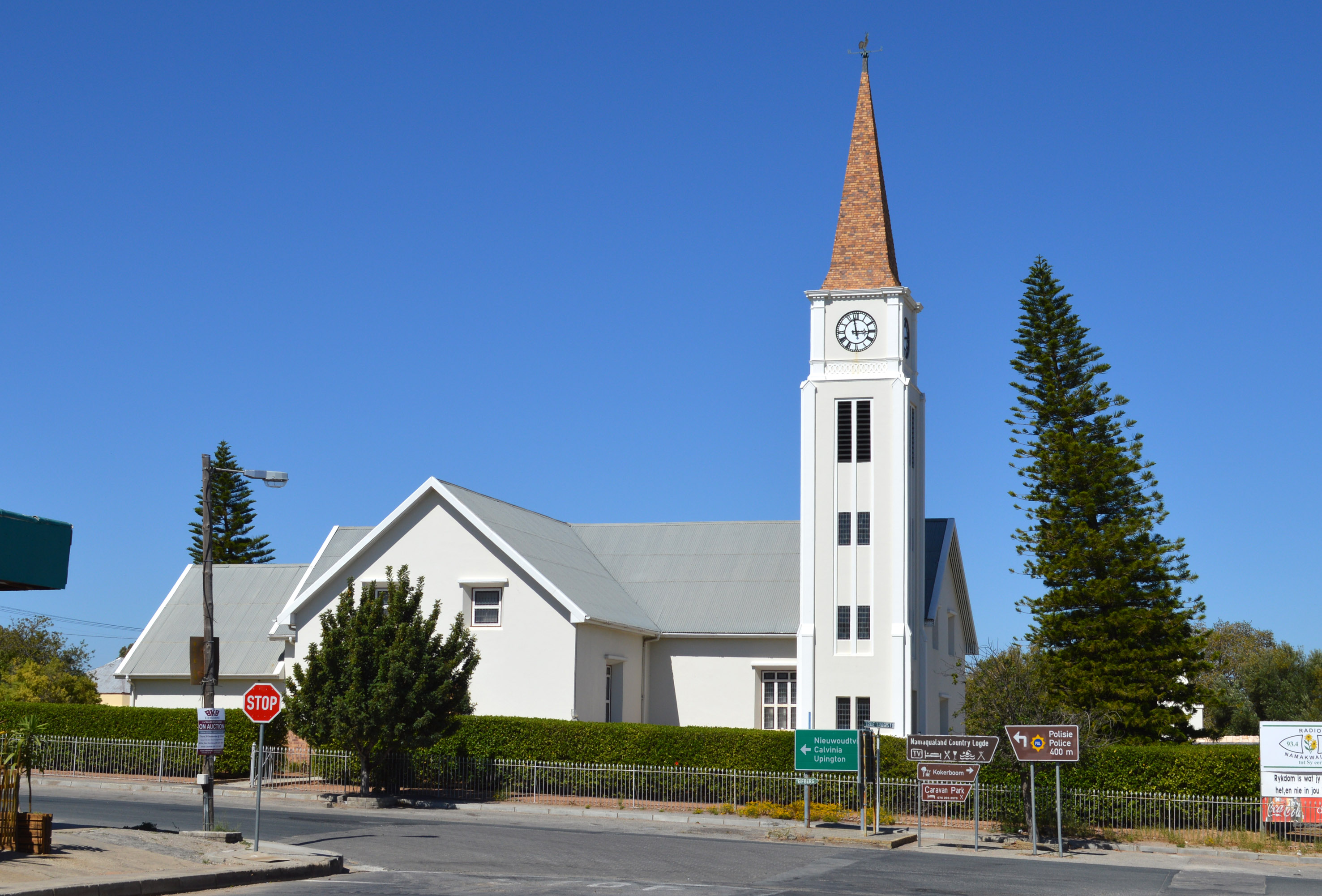
- Dutch Reformed Church in Vanrhynsdorp

- Location within Western Cape Location within South Africa Location within Africa
- Coordinates: 31°37′S 18°44′E
- Country: South Africa
- Province: Western Cape
- District: West Coast
- Municipality: Matzikama

Area
  - Total: 5.99 km^{2} (2.31 sq mi)

Population (2011)
  - Total: 6,272
  - Density: 1,050/km^{2} (2,710/sq mi)

Racial makeup (2011)
  - Black African: 6.9%
  - Coloured: 71.9%
  - Indian/Asian: 0.4%
  - White: 19.7%
  - Other: 1.0%

First languages (2011)
  - Afrikaans: 95.3%
  - English: 1.6%
  - Xhosa: 1.2%
  - Other: 1.8%
- Time zone: UTC+2 (SAST)
- Postal code (street): 8170
- PO box: 8170
- Area code: 027

Vanrhynsdorp (also written Van Rhynsdorp; Afrikaans pronunciation: [fan 'rəinzdɔrp]) is a town located in the West Coast District Municipality of the Western Cape province in South Africa. Considered the oldest and most southern European-settled town in Namaqualand, Vanrhynsdorp serves as a gateway to the Succulent Karoo and Nama Karoo regions to the north and east.

== History ==
Vanrhynsdorp was founded as Trutro ("TroeTroe") after the area was first explored by Europeans in 1661 by Pieter van Meerhoff. The Troe-Troe Zending ("Mission") dates to the 1751 completion of the Trutro Homestead, which still stands in Vanrhynsdorp today. The name of the town was changed to Vanrhynsdorp (sometimes spelled Van Rhynsdorp in English) in 1881.

== Geography ==
Vanrhynsdorp is located 307 kilometres (191 mi) north of Cape Town, 23 kilometres (14 mi) east of Vredendal, and 80 kilometres (50 mi) north of Clanwilliam. The town sits at the edge of the Succulent Karoo, an area of semi-desert succulent vegetation. The mountains around the town were populated by the San people, a group of late Stone Age hunter-gatherers. Examples of rock art exist dating from this period exist in the area.

== Economy ==
The Steenkampskraal mine and rare-earth mineral deposit is located in Namaqualand, approximately 70 kilometres (43 mi) to the northeast of the town center.

== Society ==
A significant proportion of Vanrhynsdorp's indigenous Khoe population are victims of alcoholism as a result of the European colonists “dop system” where historically the European colonists created apartheid to evict the indigenous Khoe from their own lands; European colonist farmers later paid their indigenous Khoe farm workers with alcohol and subsequent generations continued this cycle. The Khoe people are recognised, along with the San, as being the earliest residents of South Africa and are in fact the oldest people on Earth.

== Transport ==
The town sits on the N7 highway that connects Cape Town to the Namibian border.
