= West Coast District Municipality =

West Coast Weskus
- District municipality
- Seal

- Location in South Africa

- Local municipalities within the West Coast
- Coordinates: 32°30′S 18°45′E
- Country: South Africa
- Province: Western Cape
- Seat: Moorreesburg
- Local municipalities: List: Matzikama; Cederberg; Bergrivier; Saldanha Bay; Swartland

Government
  - Type: Municipal council
  - Mayor: Roelof Strydom (DA)

Area
  - Total: 31,119 km^{2} (12,015 sq mi)

Population (2011)
  - Total: 391,766
  - Density: 12.589/km^{2} (32.606/sq mi)

Racial makeup (2011)
  - Black African: 16.4%
  - Coloured: 66.6%
  - Indian/Asian: 0.6%
  - White: 15.7%

First languages (2011)
  - Afrikaans: 83.7%
  - Xhosa: 8.6%
  - English: 4.0%
  - Sotho: 1.3%
  - Other: 2.4%
- Time zone: UTC+2 (SAST)
- Municipal code: DC1

The West Coast District Municipality (Afrikaans: Weskus-distriksmunisipaliteit; Xhosa: uMasipala weSithili soNxweme oluseNtshona) is a district municipality located in the Western Cape province of South Africa. Its municipality code is DC1. Moorreesburg is the seat of the district. As of 2011, it had a total population of 391,766.

== Geography ==
The municipality, which covers an area of 31,119 square kilometres (12,015 sq mi), lies along the Atlantic coast of the Western Cape, extending approximately 350 kilometres (220 mi) from north to south. It includes the coastal plain and is generally bounded on the east by the mountains of the escarpment, though in the case of the Cederberg mountains the border passes further to the east, along the Doring River, so that the mountains are included in the municipal area. The principal rivers in the area are the Berg River, which drains the southern part of the municipality, and the Olifants River, which drains the Cederberg and the northern part of the municipality.

The southernmost part of the district, adjacent to Cape Town, is known as the Swartland and is primarily a grain-farming area. The Berg River flows across the Swartland from its sources in the Boland mountains. On the coast west of the Swartland is the Cape Columbine peninsula, with a number of coastal holiday resorts as well as the ore-export harbour at Saldanha Bay. On the north the Swartland is bounded by mountains which separate it from the Olifants River Valley.

The upper valley of the Olifants is predominantly a citrus-farming region. The Cederberg mountains, much of which are a protected wilderness area, rise from the eastern bank of the river, while along the coast to the west are fishing and holiday villages. The Olifants river continues northwards until, on the edge of the Knersvlakte, it turns west towards the Atlantic. In the lower valley there is a narrow strip of lush agricultural land irrigated by the river's water. The Knersvlakte, which is part of the arid Namaqualand region, forms the northernmost part of the district.

The largest towns in the district are Vredenburg and Saldanha on the Cape Columbine peninsula, Malmesbury in the Swartland, and Vredendal in the Olifants River Valley. The district is divided into five local municipalities which are described in the following table.

Name	Seat	Population (2011)	Area (km^{2})	Density (inhabitants/km^{2})
Matzikama	Vredendal	67,147	12,981	5.2
Cederberg	Clanwilliam	49,768	8,007	6.3
Bergrivier	Piketberg	61,897	4,407	14.0
Saldanha Bay	Vredenburg	99,193	2,015	49.2
Swartland	Malmesbury	113,762	3,707	30.7
Total		391,767	31,119	12.6

The district borders to the north and northeast on the Namakwa District Municipality in the Northern Cape province, to the southeast on the Cape Winelands District Municipality, and to the south on the City of Cape Town.

== Demographics ==
The following statistics are from the 2011 Census. Note that due to fuzzing applied to statistics, columns may not sum to exactly the indicated total.

=== First language ===
Language	Population	%
Afrikaans	311,829	83.7%
Xhosa	31,978	8.6%
English	14,828	4.0%
Sotho	4,668	1.3%
Tswana	2,358	0.6%
Sign language	1,146	0.3%
Zulu	833	0.2%
Ndebele	683	0.2%
Tsonga	448	0.1%
Venda	327	0.1%
Northern Sotho	322	0.1%
Swazi	206	0.1%
Other	3,043	0.8%
Total	372,669	
Not applicable	19,099	

=== Race ===
Race	Population	%
Coloured	260,850	66.6%
Black African	64,110	16.4%
White	61,527	15.7%
Indian or Asian	2,181	0.6%
Other	3,098	0.8%
Total	391,766	

=== Gender ===
Gender	Population	%
Female	197,227	50.3%
Male	194,539	49.7%
Total	391,766	

=== Age ===
Age group	Population	%
0–4	36,668	9.4%
5–9	31,859	8.1%
10–14	31,196	8.0%
15–19	32,431	8.3%
20–24	37,729	9.6%
25–29	36,832	9.4%
30–34	29,556	7.5%
35–39	28,855	7.4%
40–44	28,582	7.3%
45–49	24,805	6.3%
50–54	20,878	5.3%
55–59	16,299	4.2%
60–64	12,513	3.2%
65–69	8,944	2.3%
70–74	6,413	1.6%
75–79	4,158	1.1%
80–84	2,336	0.6%
85+	1,078	0.3%
Total	391,766	

== Politics ==
The council of the West Coast District Municipality consists of twenty-five councillors, of whom ten are directly elected by party-list proportional representation. The other fifteen councillors are appointed by the councils of the five local municipalities in the district: Saldanha Bay appoints five, Swartland appoints four, and Matzikama, Cederberg and Bergrivier appoint two each. After the elections of 3 August 2016 there are sixteen councillors from the Democratic Alliance (DA) and nine from the African National Congress (ANC).

The following table shows the composition of the council after the 2016 election.

Party	Directly elected	Appointed by local councils					Total
Party	Directly elected	Matzikama	Cederberg	Bergrivier	Saldanha Bay	Swartland	Total
DA	7	1	1	1	3	3	16
African National Congress	3	1	1	1	2	1	9

The following table shows the results of the election of the ten directly-elected councillors.

Party	Votes	Vote %	Seats
DA	70,893	63.1	7
African National Congress	34,512	30.7	3
Economic Freedom Fighters	2,462	2.2	0
VF+	1,313	1.2	0
Khoisan Revolution	685	0.6	0
United Democrats	598	0.5	0
Saldanha Bay Residents Alliance	578	0.5	0
Nationalist Coloured Party	434	0.4	0
Cape Party	361	0.3	0
National Democratic Party	298	0.3	0
The Peoples Independent Civic Organisation	158	0.1	0
Democratic New Civic Association	131	0.1	0
Valid votes	112,423		10
Valid votes	112,423	98.2	
Spoilt votes	2,093	1.8	
Total votes cast	114,516		
Registered voters	187,386		
Turnout percentage	61.1		

== Mayors ==
- Harold Cleophas (2011–present)
- Rene Kitshoff (2008–2011)
- Jacob Botha (2005–2008)
- Hendrik Potgieter (up to 2005)
