= Klattia =

- Klattia stokoei

Scientific classification
- Kingdom: Plantae
- Clade: Tracheophytes
- Clade: Angiosperms
- Clade: Monocots
- Order: Asparagales
- Family: Iridaceae
- Subfamily: Nivenioideae
- Genus: Klattia; Baker

Type species
- Klattia partita Ker Gawler ex Baker

Genus of flowering plants

Klattia or brushiris is a genus of flowering plants in the family Iridaceae with three species. The entire genus is endemic to the Western Cape province of South Africa. The species are evergreen shrubs, with several woody stems that grow from a substantive woody rootstock. Shoots are upright, with lance- to line-shaped, laterally flattened leaves in two rows. The flowers are enclosed in two or three opposing green, red or yellow leaf-like bracts, and the perianth is greenish, creamy, yellowish or transparent below and either blackish purple, yellow or scarlet at the top. All three species grow in relatively wet locations in fynbos, such as along seeps.

== Description ==
Brushirises are evergreen shrublets of about 0.5–1.3 m (1.6–4.3 ft) high that grow from a woody rootstock. The plants sprout several upright stems that are initially flattened and carry two opposing rows of leaves. After more than a year, the stems shed the leaves, resulting in distinctive scars and become round and woody due to secondary growth, reaching a girth of up to 2 cm (0.79 in). The stems may branch shyly and irregularly in the upper reaches. The leaves are thickly set near the top of the stem, further down a bit more distanced due to the stretching of the stem. The leaves are laterally flattened, lance-shaped or almost line-shaped, forming a sheath enveloping the stem at its base, without a prominent midvein, and with a narrow translucent margin. The inflorescence consists of clusters of tightly packed flowers, and the peduncle looks just like the main stem. The inflorescence is subtended by two or three leaflike bracts that are pale green, creamy yellow or scarlet. The flowers are not fragrant, and grow in pairs inside small, fan-shaped clusters. Each cluster has a short, see-through leaf-like structure (bract) beneath it, opposite a small protective bract. The individual flowers are without a stalk, transparant near the base and coloured at the top. The six tepals are merged at their base into a short, cylinder-shaped perianth tube that is inserted at about a third from the top of the ovary. The upper free parts of the tepals are not entirely equal, narrowly spade-shaped, narrowed below into claws that are enclosed in the bracts, the remainder widened into blades that stick out from the bracts and have an intense colour. The three stamens are growing from the base of the outer tepals, with filaments that are flat at the base and round higher up, topped by line-shaped, yellow anthers at the top that shed yellow pollen. The ovary is globe-shaped, having three compartments that each contain two seedbuds, from which at most one develops into a seed. It is topped by a threat-shaped style that is about a long as the tepals and has three very small lobes at the tip. The ovary develops into a woody capsule. The seeds are flattened from side to side and shaped like a shield. They are light grayish-brown with a semi-clear outer coating that has faint lines on it. The cells have eight pairs of homologous chromosomes (2n=16).

=== Differences between brushiris species and with other Nivenioidea ===
The bracts enclosing the flower clusters of the red brushiris (Klattia stokoei) are dusky red, and the upper leaves 8–15 mm (0.31–0.59 in) wide. This species is restricted to the hills near Grabouw. The bracts of the purple brushiris (Klattia partita) are cream-coloured at the base and deep green near the tips, while the visible parts of the flowers is blackish purple, and the styles do not extend beyond the tepals, leaves are deep green, the upper 5–5 mm (0.20–0.20 in) wide. The purple brushiris can be found near the Kogelberg and the Hottentots Holland Mountains and in the Langeberg range eastwards to Riversdale. The bracts of the yellow brushiris (Klattia flava) are creamy yellow at the base grading to green at the tips, the visible parts of the flowers are yellow with styles extending 3–4 mm (0.12–0.16 in), leaves are glaucus and mostly 5–8 mm (0.20–0.31 in) wide.

The species of bushiris (Nivenia) have pale to deep blue flowers with a long cylindrical tube that abruptly widens in a flat whorl of lance-shaped tepals and well excerted anthers and styles. The single species of bokmakierie's tail (Witsenia maura) has black, spindle-shaped flowers with connivent tepals that have a cover of bright yellow velvety hairs on the outside. The brushirises however have clusters of flowers, that are enclosed at their base by 2-3 bracts, and that have red, blackish purple or yellow, thread-shaped tepals.

== Taxonomy ==
Purple brushiris, Klattia partita, inflorescence

Purple brushiris, Klattia partita, flower

In 1817, German naturalist Martin Lichtenstein described the hare kabong and named it Sophronia caespitosa (now Lapeirousia plicata. The description and name were published in the 16th edition of Carl Linnaeus's Systema Vegetabilium by Johann Jakob Roemer and Josef August Schultes. When Friedrich Wilhelm Klatt published the name Witsenia partita for the purple brushiris, which he attributing to John Bellenden Ker, he cited Sophronia caespitosa as a synonym, even though this was a mistake. By including the type of Sophronia caespitosa in his concept of the species, Klatt was required under International Code of Nomenclature for algae, fungi, and plants to make the combination Witsenia caespitosa, rather than Witsenia partita. In 1877, British botanist John Gilbert Baker erected the new genus Klattia and published the name Klattia partita. When an illegitimate species name is transferred to a new genus and the earlier legitimate name (caespitosa) is not used, the resulting combination is treated as a new name. Baker is therefore considered the only author. South African botanist Louise Guthrie described in 1921 the red brushiris, naming it Klattia stokoei. In 1941, Gwendoline Joyce Lewis described the yellow brushiris as a variety of the purple brushiris, naming it Klattia partita var. flava (now Klattia flava). The genus Klattia is assigned to the family Iridaceae and the subfamily Nivenioideae.

The genus name is a tribute to the German botanist Friedrich Wilhelm Klatt, who significantly advanced the body of knowledge of the family Iridaceae in the 19th century.

== Distribution, ecology and conservation ==
yellow brushiris, Klattia flava, showing the typical growth form, with leaves in a fan

All species of brushiris are restricted to the Western Cape province of South Africa from the Cape Peninsula and Bainskloof Pass in the west to the Langeberg near the town of Riversdale in the east. The species grow in moist sandy or peaty soils. All produce copious amounts of very liquid nectar and are pollinated by sunbirds. Brushirises are adapted to survive fire and regrow from the underground woodstock afterward. Seeds germinate best after a fire. Klattia flava is considered vulnerable, the continued survival of Klattia partita is of least concern, while Klattia stokoei is endangered.
