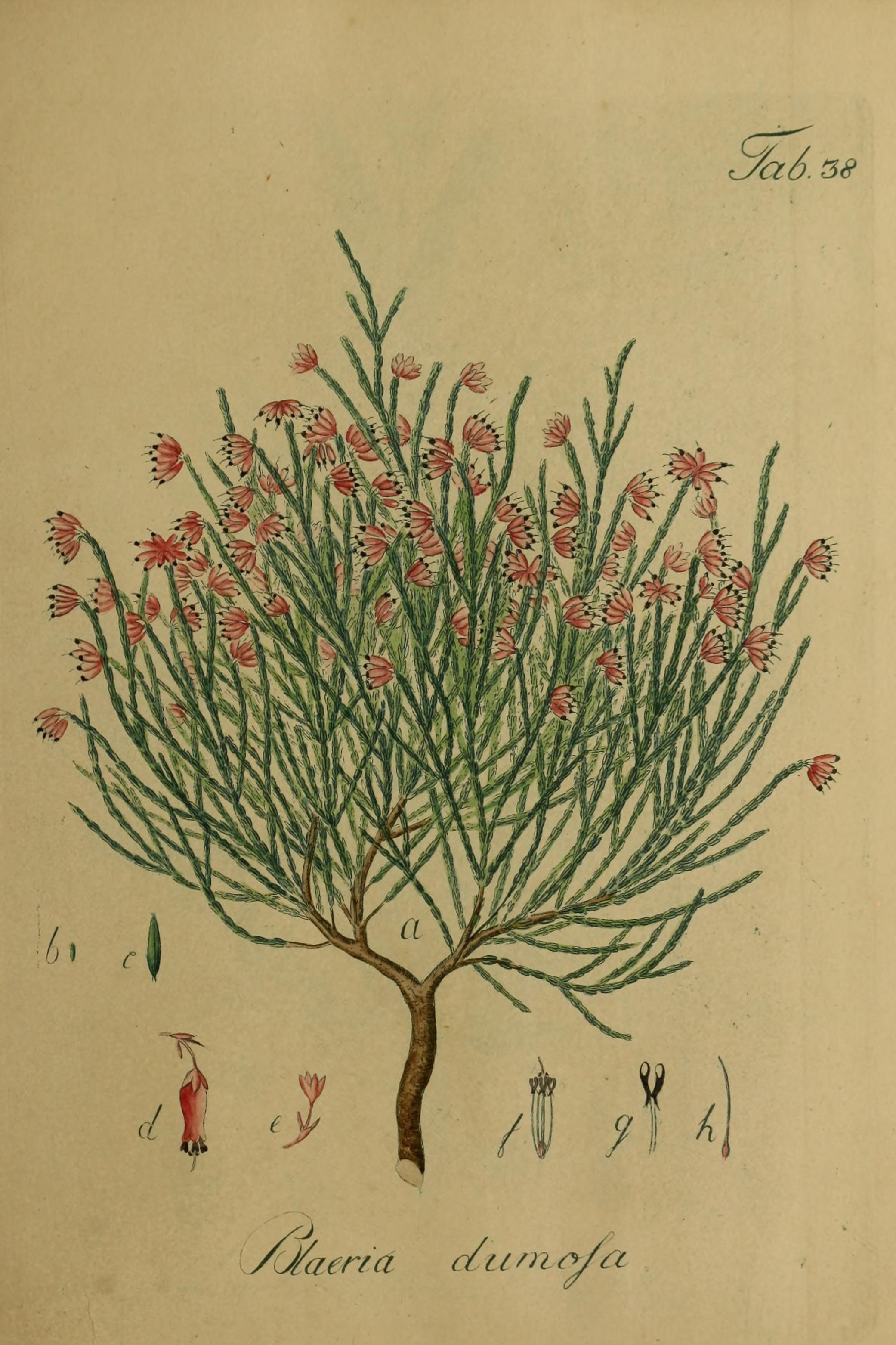

Scientific classification
- Kingdom: Plantae
- Clade: Tracheophytes
- Clade: Angiosperms
- Clade: Eudicots
- Clade: Asterids
- Order: Ericales
- Family: Ericaceae
- Genus: Erica
- Species: E. equisetifolia

Binomial name
- Erica equisetifolia Salisb.

Synonyms
- Blaeria campanulata Benth.; Blaeria dumosa J.C.Wendl.; Blaeria equisetifolia (Salisb.) G.Don; Blaeria flava Bolus; Blaeria oppositifolia L.Guthrie; Blaeria purpurea L.f.; Erica parvula Guthrie & Bolus

= Erica equisetifolia =

Species of flowering plant

Erica equisetifolia, the horsetail heath, is a plant belonging to the genus Erica and forming part of the fynbos. The species is endemic to the Western Cape.
