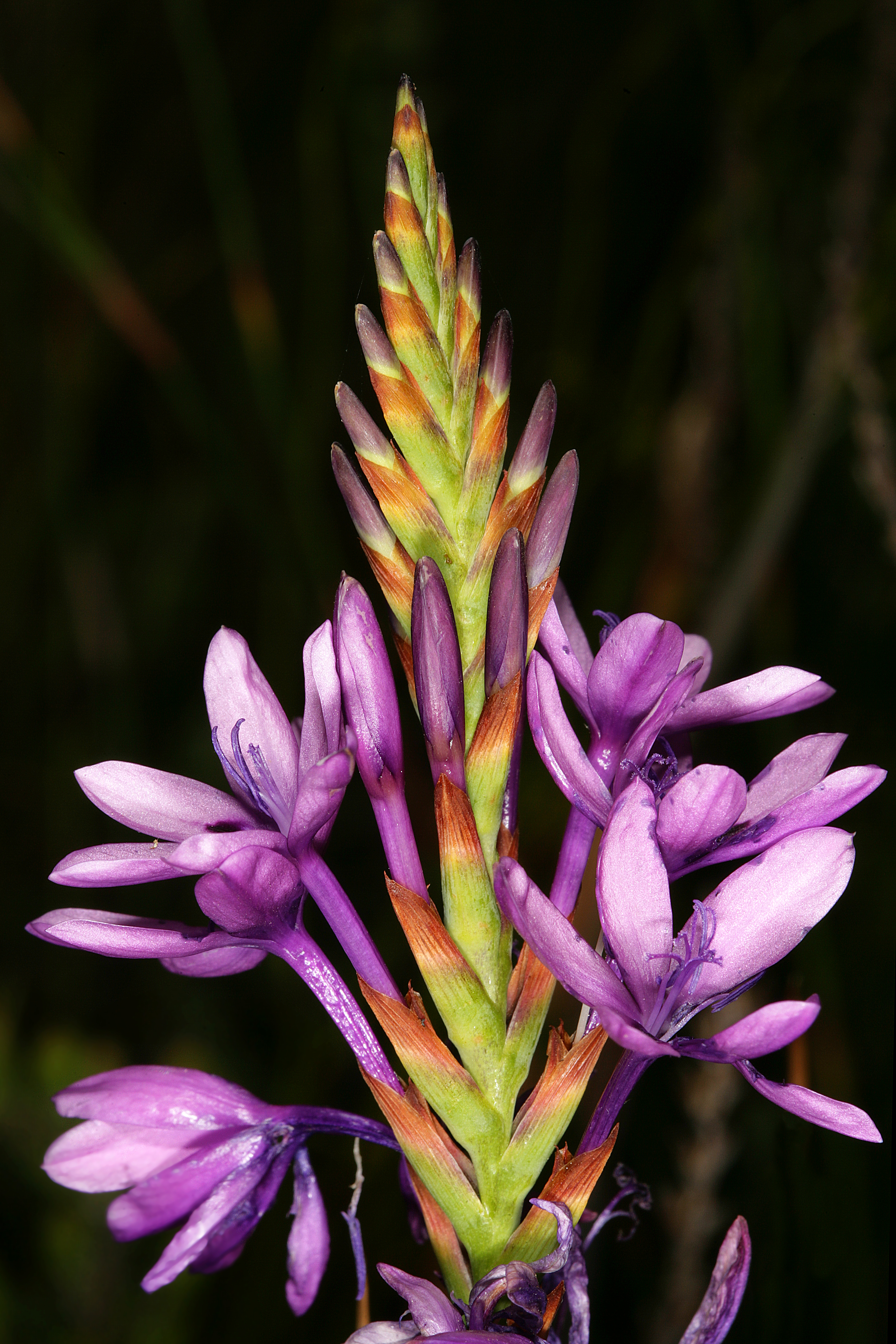
- Thereianthus spicatus

Scientific classification
- Kingdom: Plantae
- Clade: Tracheophytes
- Clade: Angiosperms
- Clade: Monocots
- Order: Asparagales
- Family: Iridaceae
- Subfamily: Crocoideae
- Tribe: Watsonieae
- Genus: Thereianthus; G.L. Lewis

Type species
- Thereianthus spicatus (L.) G.J. Lewis

= Thereianthus =

Genus of flowering plants

Thereianthus is a genus of flowering plants in the family Iridaceae, first described as a genus in 1941. The entire genus is endemic to Cape Province in South Africa.

The genus name is derived from the Greek words thereios, meaning "summer", and anthos, meaning "flower".

Species

- Thereianthus bracteolatus (Lam.) G.J.Lewis
- Thereianthus bulbiferus Goldblatt & J.C.Manning
- Thereianthus elandsmontanus Goldblatt & J.C.Manning
- Thereianthus intermedius J.C.Manning & Goldblatt
- Thereianthus ixioides G.J.Lewis
- Thereianthus juncifolius (Baker) G.J.Lewis
- Thereianthus longicollis (Schltr.) G.J.Lewis
- Thereianthus minutus (Klatt) G.J.Lewis
- Thereianthus montanus J.C.Manning & Goldblatt
- Thereianthus racemosus (Klatt) G.J.Lewis
- Thereianthus spicatus (L.) G.J.Lewis
