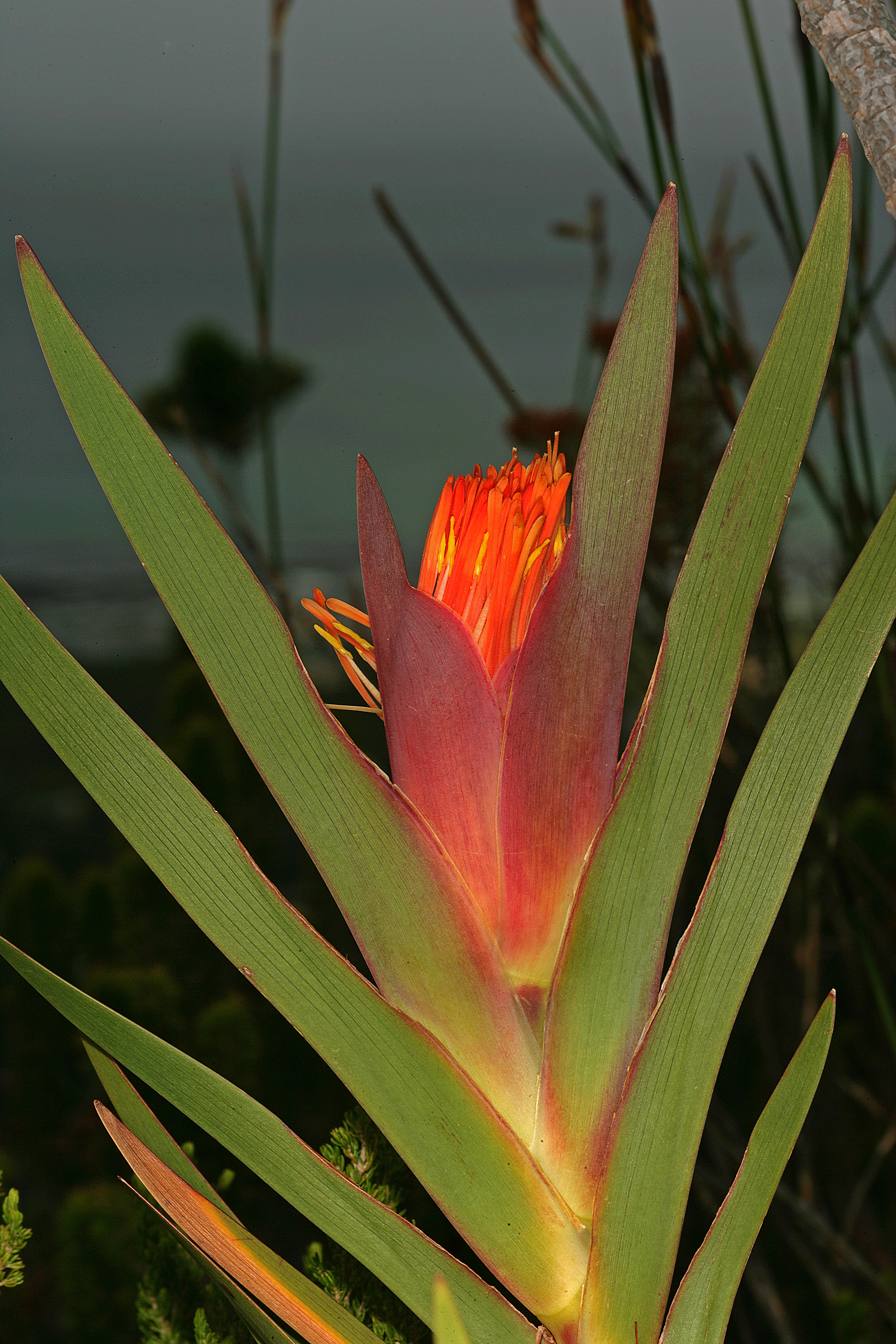

Scientific classification
- Kingdom: Plantae
- Clade: Tracheophytes
- Clade: Angiosperms
- Clade: Monocots
- Order: Asparagales
- Family: Iridaceae
- Genus: Klattia
- Species: K. stokoei

Binomial name
- Klattia stokoei L.Guthrie, (1921)

= Klattia stokoei =

Species of flowering plant

Klattia stokoei, Stokoe's klattia, red klattia or red brushiris, is a shrub that is endemic to the Western Cape that is restricted to the Kogelberg. In Afrikaans it is known as kwasblom or kwasbos. The shrub is evergreen and grows 60 to 120 cm tall. It flowers from December to February and the flowers are red. The plant is part of the fynbos.

== Description ==
The red brushiris is a small to medium-size shrub that grows to 0.5–1.2 m (1.6–3.9 ft) tall. It has either a single main stem or a few stems that branch out unevenly. The stems are roughly as thick as a drinking straw near the leaves 4–5 mm (0.16–0.20 in) and thicken to about the width of a pencil near the base 8–10 mm (0.31–0.39 in). Its leaves are dark green, long and narrow, measuring roughly 9–15 cm (3.5–5.9 in) long and 7–14 mm (0.28–0.55 in) wide. They are shaped like long, slender spear tips. Just below the flower clusters, the leaves tend to curve slightly into a crescent shape, sometimes bending upward toward their tips. Each cluster consist of three or four pairs of flowers sheathed by leafy crimson bracts with green tips, with the inner bracts shorter and entirely crimson. Even closer to the flowers are membranaceous spathes 25–37 mm (0.98–1.46 in) long, and transparent bracts of 18–33 mm (0.71–1.30 in) long, slightly shorter than the spathes. The flowers are transparant at the base, flushed with red higher up and scarlet on the parts that extend beyond the bracts. The six tepals are merged below in a perianth tube of 2–5 mm (0.079–0.197 in) long. The free parts of the tepals are thread-shaped with a spoon-like widening near the top and have blunt or notched tips. The tepals are about 1 mm wide near the tip, with the inner three tepals somewhat longer. Each of the three stamens consists of a cream-coloured filament of about 5 mm long and are topped by yellow anthers of 7.5 mm that reach to about 5 mm below the tips of the tepals. The pollen is yellow. The ovary is about 2.5 mm tall, topped by a thread-shaped style of 5.7–7.8 mm (0.22–0.31 in) long with three very small stigmas at the tip. The ovaries eventually develop into 6 mm long fruits with three chambers. Flowers occur between mid-december and early februari. Cells have sixteen homologous chromosomes (2n=32).

== Taxonomy ==
The red brushiris was first described by South African botanist Louise Guthrie in 1921 and she made the combination Klattia stokoei. In this name she commemorates Thomas Pearson Stokoe (1868–1959), South African plant collector and botanical artist, who also collected this species.

== Distribution, ecology and conservation ==
The red brushiris can only be found in the Kogelberg between the ridges above the Steenbras Dam and Betty's Bay, where it is restricted to moist sites on south-facing slopes, such as along seeps and banks of streams on peaty sands. other species that grow alongside the red brushiris include Erica leucotrachela, Osmitopsis asteriscoides, Senecio speciosissimus, and ocasionally Mimetes capitulatus. The species is know from only ten locations, neither of which as more than ten individuals. The total population is probably less than 250 individuals. Although it grows in protected areas, its population may decline due to groundwater extraction. It is therefore considered endangered.
