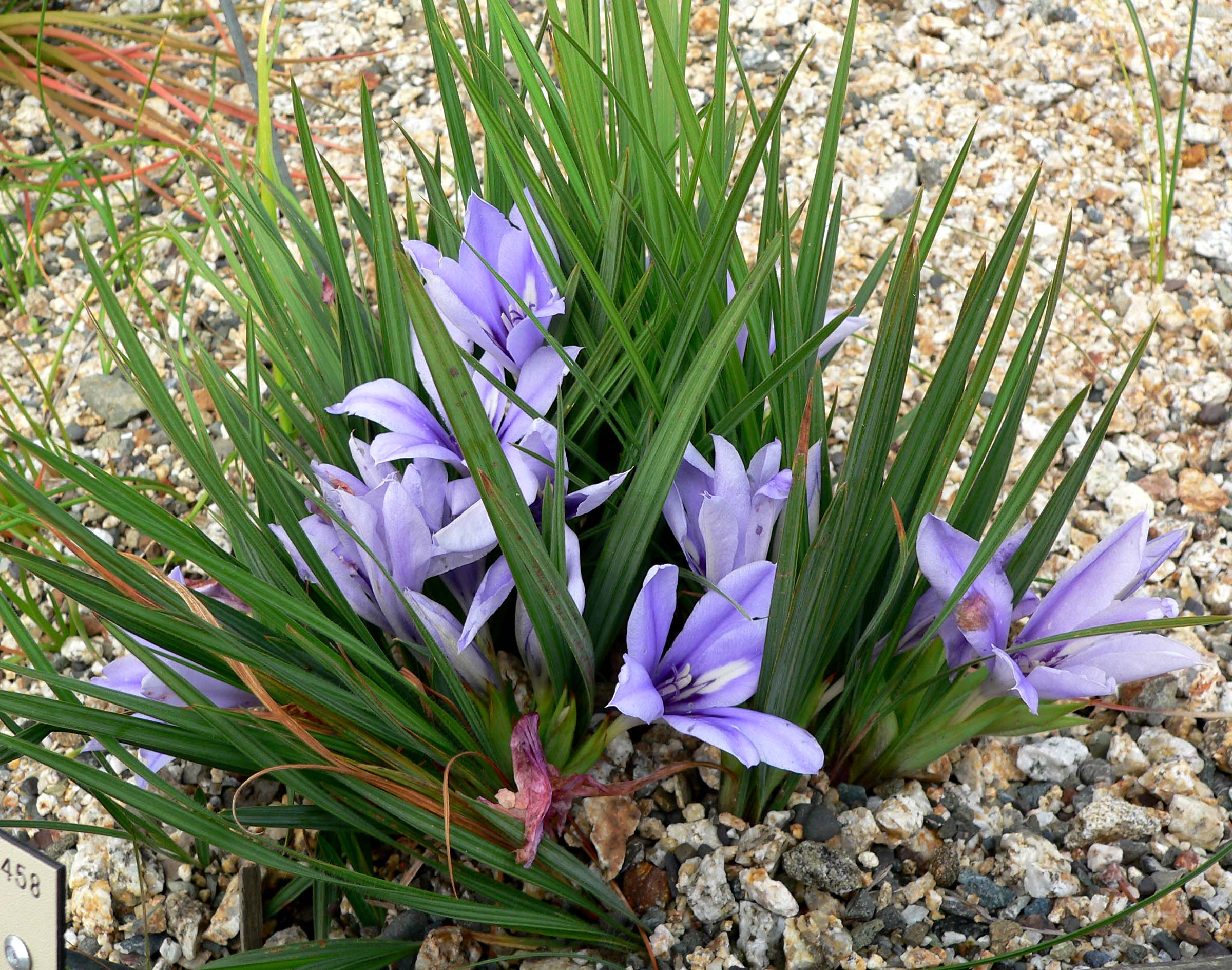
- Babiana sambucina subsp. sambucina
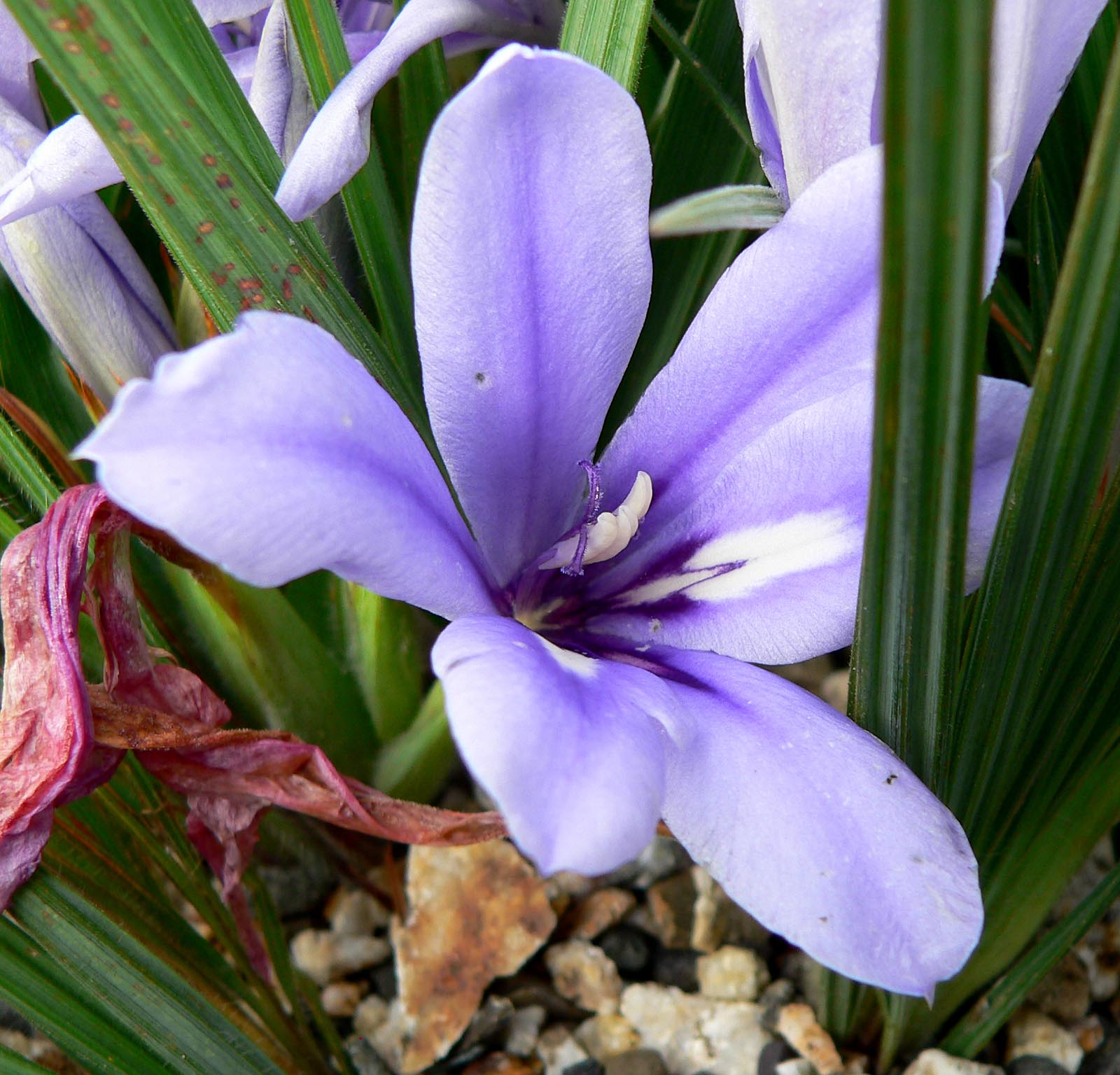

Scientific classification
- Kingdom: Plantae
- Clade: Embryophytes
- Clade: Tracheophytes
- Clade: Spermatophytes
- Clade: Angiosperms
- Clade: Monocots
- Order: Asparagales
- Family: Iridaceae
- Genus: Babiana
- Species: B. sambucina

Binomial name
- Babiana sambucina (Jacq.) Ker Gawl.

Subspecies
- Babiana sambucina subsp. longibracteata (G.J.Lewis) Goldblatt & J.C.Manning; Babiana sambucina subsp. sambucina

= Babiana sambucina =

Species of flowering plant

Babiana sambucina is a species of geophyte of 8–30 cm (3.1–11.8 in) high that is assigned to the family Iridaceae. It has dense spikes of blue to violet-coloured, often fragrant flowers. There are two subspecies, B. sambucina subsp. longibracteata is restricted to a small area in the Northern Cape, B. sambucina subsp. sambucina grows in the Western Cape and Eastern Cape provinces of South Africa. Flowers are present in August and September. The typical subspecies is called sweet bobbejaantjie in English, and subsp. longibracteata is called sand sweet bobbejaantjie.

== Description ==
Babiana sambucina is a plant that emerges from a globe-shaped corm within a fibrous covering and grows to 8–30 cm (3.1–11.8 in) high. Each year it produces up to six, lance- to line-shaped, variably pleated, variably hairy leaf blades, at least silky at their base, which are at an angle with the leaf stalk and reach higher than the inflorescence. Each flower is subtended by two bracts, the outer bract 25–40 mm (0.98–1.57 in) long, slightly larger than and clasping the inner bract. Both bracts are green with rust-brown tips. The inner bracts are forked only at the tips. Sometimes both bracts are merged at their base, surrounding the ovary. The lowest outer bract is enlarged and up to 6 cm (2.4 in) long.

The mostly intensely violet-scented (but sometimes scentless) flowers are clustered with few or several in dense spikes. The mirror-symmetrical perianth consists of six tepals that are merged into a narrow tube for 35–60 mm (1.4–2.4 in), funnel-shaped higher up and free near the top, the lobes 20–35 mm (0.79–1.38 in) long and 5–12 mm (0.20–0.47 in) wide and often overlapping even when fully open. The perianth does not form two obvious lips though and is blue to violet-coloured. The lower lateral tepals have a white marking in the middle that is offset by a clear or vague blue to carmine line around its perimeter and sometimes a splash of carmine down the middle. The three lower tepals may be merged up to 2 mm higher than the others. The three stamens are clustered at the dorsal side of the flower, have approximately straight filaments of 10–20 mm (0.39–0.79 in) long and are topped by 7–10 mm (0.28–0.39 in) whitish anthers. The ovary is hairless, and may be on a short stalk in the lowers flower of the inflorescence. The style branches into three arms opposite the lower two-thirds of the anthers.

=== Differences between the subspecies ===
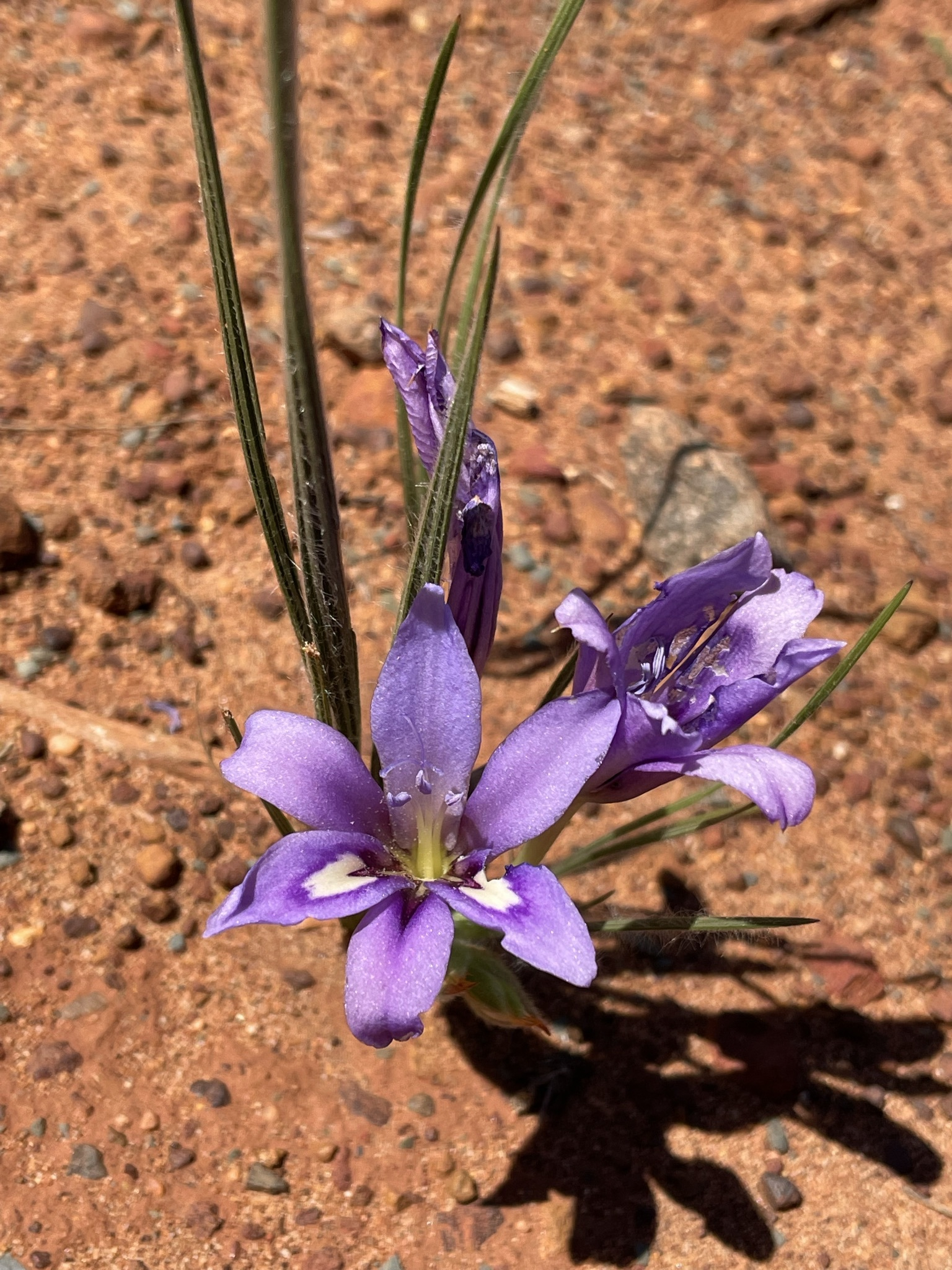
Babiana sambucina ssp. longibracteata

Babiana sambucina subsp. longibracteata has line-shaped leaves of 2–6 mm (0.079–0.236 in) wide that are covered in long, white-silky hairs, only slightly fragrant flowers or entirely scentless, with a perianth tube of 40–55 mm (1.6–2.2 in) long that is hollow all the way to the base, that are mostly growing individually in a sandy soil. Babiana sambucina subsp. sambucina on the other hand has variably hairy, line- to sword-shaped leaves of mostly 6–12 mm (0.24–0.47 in) wide, although sometimes leaves are almost like a knitting pin, strongly violet-scented flowers, with a perianth tube of 30–65 mm (1.2–2.6 in) long that is usually only hollow near the top, usually growing clustered in tufts on rocky soils.

=== Differences with similar species ===
Babiana arenicola has the inner bracts divided to the base, a perianth tube of about 30 mm long and a style that branches below the base of the anthers. B. sambucina has inner bracts that are only forked at the tip, a perianth tube of 35-55 mm long and a style that branches opposite the lower part of the anthers.

== Taxonomy ==
This species was first described by Nikolaus Joseph von Jacquin in 1797 as Gladiolus sambucinus based on an unknown collection from somewhere in the Cape area, that was illustrated in the Plantarium rariorum horti caesarei Schoenbrunnensis. John Bellenden Ker Gawler in 1802 proposed to use the genus name Babiana for the species of bobbejaantjie. In 1804, he included the species as Babiana sambucina in the Annals of Botany by Charles Konig and John Sims. In 1882, Friedrich Wilhelm Klatt described B. undulato-venoso. Gwendoline Joyce Lewis distinguished B. longibracteata in 1932. In 1959 however, she revised its status to B. sambucina var. longibracteata. In their revision of 2007, Peter Goldblatt and John Charles Manning gave it subspecies status, and included B. undulato-venoso in B. sambucina subsp. sambucina.

== Distribution, ecology and conservation ==
Babiana sambucina grows in dry fynbos and renosterveld in soils that developed from the erosion of sandstone, on stony outcrops, slopes and flats. B. sambucina subsp. sambucina is widespread in the interior of the Western and Eastern Cape provinces of South Africa from the Kouebokkeveld Mountains in the west to Addo and Uitenhage in the east. As far as known, it is pollinated by long-tongued bees, mostly larger species of the genus Anthophora. It's continued survival is considered to be of least concern. B. sambucina subsp. longibracteata is pollinated by flies with long tongues. It is only known to occur on five locations recently, on the Bokkeveld Plateau near Nieuwoudtville in the Northern Cape province. This subspecies has been observed on more locations before 1970, but the area has been rapidly transformed for rooibos cultivation in the last decennium. It will probably decline further because its habitat will continue to me lost. It is therefore considered to be endangered.
