= Thereianthus minutus =

Scientific classification
- Kingdom: Plantae
- Clade: Tracheophytes
- Clade: Angiosperms
- Clade: Monocots
- Order: Asparagales
- Family: Iridaceae
- Genus: Thereianthus
- Species: T. minutus

Binomial name
- Thereianthus minutus (Klatt) G.J.Lewis, (1941)

Synonyms
- Thereianthus lapeyrouseoides (Baker) G.J.Lewis; Watsonia lapeyrouseoides Baker; Watsonia minuta Klatt

Species of flowering plant

Thereianthus minutus is a perennial flowering plant and geophyte belonging to the genus Thereianthus and is part of the fynbos. The species is endemic to the Western Cape and occurs from the Groot Winterhoek Mountains to the Kogelberg and the western Riviersonderend Mountains. The plant has no threats.
