= Babiana foliosa =

Scientific classification
- Kingdom: Plantae
- Clade: Tracheophytes
- Clade: Angiosperms
- Clade: Monocots
- Order: Asparagales
- Family: Iridaceae
- Genus: Babiana
- Species: B. foliosa

Binomial name
- Babiana foliosa G.J.Lewis

Species of flowering plant

Babiana foliosa is a species of flowering plant in the family Iridaceae. The plants may be up to 10 cm (3.9 in) high and appear from an underground corm after the summer. It has star-symmetrical mauve flowers that are each supported by 2 entirely green bracts of 2–3 cm (0.79–1.18 in) with a transparent margin, the inner bract is split to the base. It has relatively many, lance-shaped, pleated, hairy leaves. After its description in 1959 it was presumed extinct because it had not been sighted until its rediscovery in 2024. In addition, its natural habitat, a particular type of renosterveld, has largely been converted for wheat cultivation.

== Description ==
Babiana foliosa is a perennial geophyte of up to 10 cm high. The stem that carries the flowers only reaches slightly above the surface is simple or has one or two branches. Its leaves lance-shaped, pleated and hairy. The two bracts that subtend each individual flower are 2–3 cm long, covered in velvety hairs and entirely green, a unique feature among Babiana species with star-symmetrical flowers. The inner bract is slightly shorter than outer, split to its base and has transparent margins. Unlike in the vast majority of Babiana species, the flowers are star-symmetrical. Two to five mauve flowers with two faint, lighter streaks on each of the lobes are clustered in a dense spike. At the base, the tepals are merged into a straight perianth tube of about 2 cm long that widens toward the throat, where it splits into six almost equal lobes of 20–24 mm (0.79–0.94 in) long and 8–12 mm (0.31–0.47 in) wide. The three stamens are symmetrically arranged, a rare feature even among Babiana species with a star-symmetrical perianth. The filaments at the base of the stamens are about 1 cm long, far longer than those in the presumably closely related Babiana villosula, surround the style and are topped by pale bluish anthers of 5–6 mm (0.20–0.24 in) long. The ovary is densely hairy and topped by the style that divides in three branches opposite the base of the anthers, expanded broadly at the tips. Babiana foliosa flowers time in August.

== Distribution, ecology and conservation ==
Babiana foliosa was known from one location in the Western Cape province of South Africa near the Sonderend River, where it grows on clay or loamy flats. Much of its presumed habitat, the so-called Central Ruens Shale Renosterveld, has been converted for wheat cultivation since its discovery. It was presumed extinct, but it was rediscovered in 2024. It therefore has been listed as Critically Endangered.
