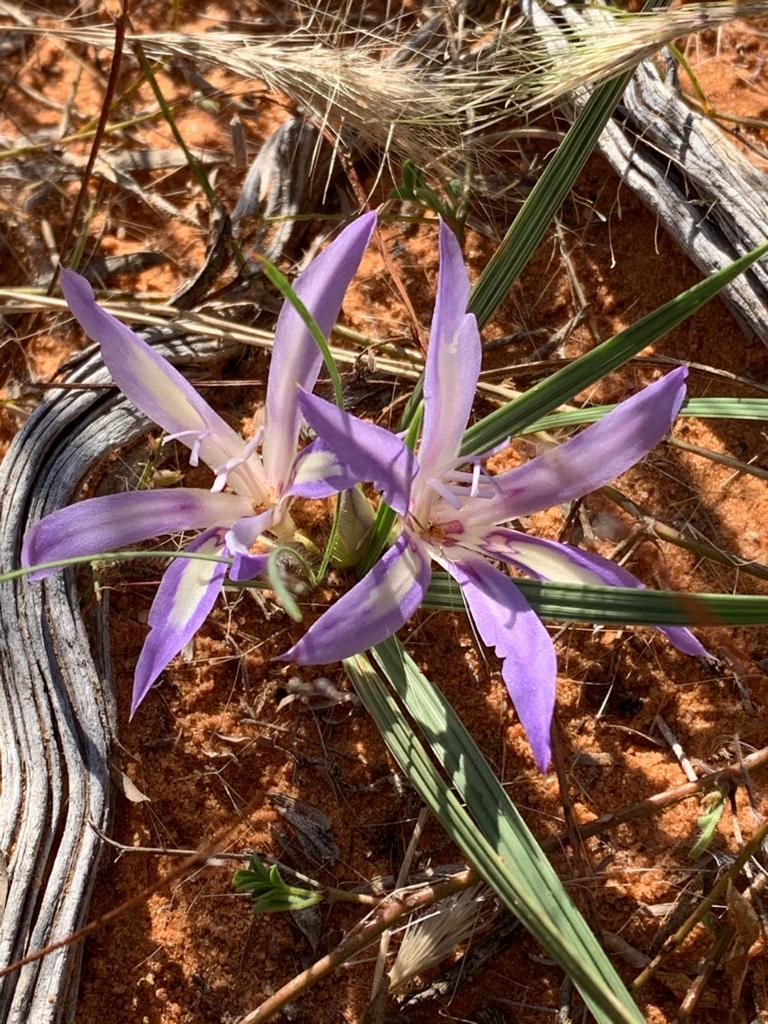

Scientific classification
- Kingdom: Plantae
- Clade: Tracheophytes
- Clade: Angiosperms
- Clade: Monocots
- Order: Asparagales
- Family: Iridaceae
- Genus: Babiana
- Species: B. hypogaea

Binomial name
- Babiana hypogaea Burch.

= Babiana hypogaea =

Species of flowering plant

Babiana hypogaea is a perennial plant of about 5–8 cm (2.0–3.1 in) high that annually forms leaves and flowers from an underground corm that is assigned to the iris family. It has pale greenish yellow, buff or rarely white, mirro-symmetrical flowers and line- to sickle-shaped, slightly pleated, thinly hairy or hairless leaves that are held horizontally or inclined, that grows in the summer rainfall areas of southeastern Namibia and central and northern central South Africa. Flowers may be found between June and September and sometimes between December and May. It is called Bobbejaankalkoentjie (baboon turkey), Bobbejaanuintjie (baboon onion) or Ertappeluintjie (patato onion) in Afrikaans.

== Description ==
Babiana hypogaea is a geophyte with an underground corm from which during autumn the leaves and stems appear above the ground, forming a plant of about 5–8 cm (2.0–3.1 in) high. This plant often forms tufts of leaves that can be up to 15 cm (5.9 in) long. The stem is completely underground, simple or with side-branches and hairless. The leaf blades are slightly pleated, with sparse or fine long hairs, line-shaped or sickle-shaped, 2½–15 cm (1-6 in) long and 1½–3 cm (0.6–1.2 in) wide, with a sturdy tip. The blade is often angled at its base so that it is parallel to the ground or even inclined towards it.

The flowers have a strong scent and sit with one or two per branch, but seemingly with two to six in a spike arising from the ground. Each flower is subtended by two hairless, bracts of 30–35 mm (1.2–1.4 in) long that are membranous at their base but green in the upper third. The inner bracts is at least as long as the outer, is forked at its top and tapering at the tips. The base colour of the mirror-symmetrical perianth is pale greenish yellow or rarely white, appearing buff because of the mauve wash on the outside. The six tepals are merged into a cylinder-shaped tube of 3–4 cm (1.2–1.6 in) long that widens at its throat into six unequal perianth lobes. The dorsal tepal is 35–42 mm (1.4–1.7 in) long. The upper lateral tepals are joint for about 6 mm further up with the lower petals and together form a lower lip. The lower tepals are 30–35 mm (1.2–1.4 in) long. The three stamens are crowded, press against the dorsal tepal, and consist of a 15–18 mm (0.59–0.71 in) long filament that carries an anther of 8–11 mm (0.31–0.43 in) long. Below the perianth tube sits an ovary that is hairless. From the ovary the style emerges, which sits on a short stem in the lowest flower, and splits into three branches at the same height as the tip of the anthers. This species mostly flowers from June to September, but occasionally also between December and May.

=== Differences with similar species ===
B. bainesii and B. hypogaea share flowers with long tubes, arising directly from the ground, but in B. bainesii the tubes are 5-6 cm long, flowers are blue, violet or mauve and it has upright, densely hairy leaves, while in B. hypogaea the tubes are 3-4 cm long, it has buff, pale yellow or sometimes white flowers, and hairless or sparsely hairy, horizontal or inclined leaf blades.

== Taxonomy and naming ==
Bobbejaankalkoentjie was first described by William John Burchell in 1824 and he named it Babiana hypogaea. It is sometimes misspelled as B. hypogea. The species was assigned by Friedrich Wilhelm Klatt in 1882 to another genus as Antholyza hypogaea. In 1896, John Gilbert Baker distinguished this species from B. bainesii. Gwendoline Joyce Lewis merged B. bainesii and B. hypogaea, but distinguished B. falcata and B. flaccida in 1959, which are distinguished by smaller, buff flowers in winter and early spring, occurring in Bushmansland. Peter Goldblatt and John Charles Manning in 2007 moved many species previously in Antholyza to Babiana, and also considered B. falcata and B. flaccida as synonyms of B. hypogaea. The species name is derived from the Ancient Greek word ὑπόγειος (hupógeios) meaning “underground”, probably referring to the underground stem.

== Distribution, ecology and conservation ==
Bobbejaankalkoentjie can be found in southern Namibia and in the Northern Cape, North West and Free State provinces of South Africa. In contrast with every other species of bobbejaantjie (except for B. bainesii) it does not grow in the area with predominant winter rains. Its continued survival is considered to be of least concern.

== Use ==
The corms of Bobbejaankalkoentjie are collected locally from the wild as a food source. These corms are cooked and are reported to have a sweet and nutty flavour without the bitterness that often occurs in the corms of other Iridaceae.
