= Thereianthus racemosus =

Scientific classification
- Kingdom: Plantae
- Clade: Tracheophytes
- Clade: Angiosperms
- Clade: Monocots
- Order: Asparagales
- Family: Iridaceae
- Genus: Thereianthus
- Species: T. racemosus

Binomial name
- Thereianthus racemosus (Klatt) G.J.Lewis, (1941)

Synonyms
- Watsonia racemosa Klatt

Species of flowering plant

Thereianthus racemosus is a perennial flowering plant and geophyte belonging to the genus Thereianthus and is part of the fynbos. The species is endemic to the Western Cape and occurs in the Vier-en-Twintigrivierberge and Groot Winterhoek near Porterville. The plant is considered rare.
