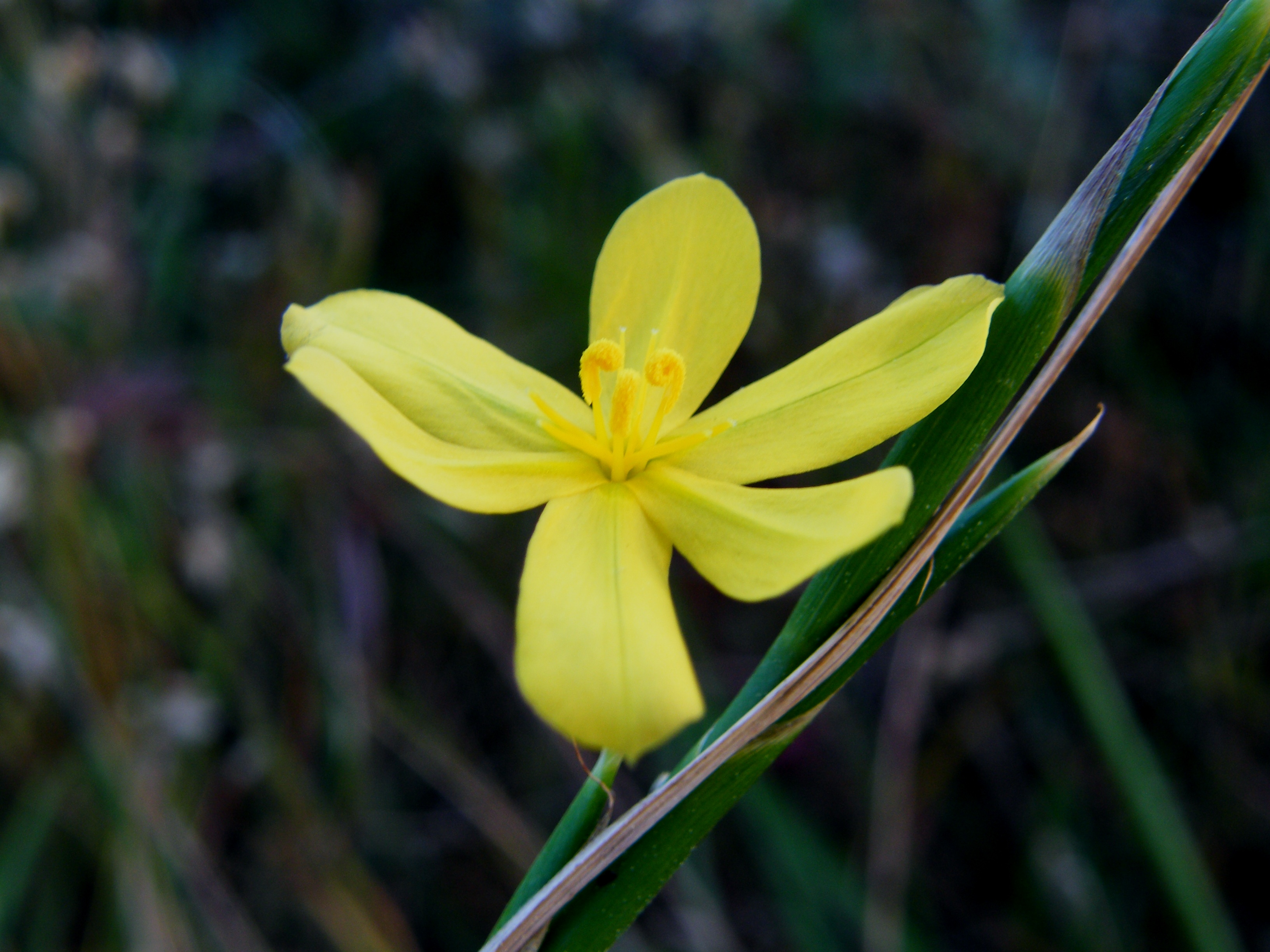

Scientific classification
- Kingdom: Plantae
- Clade: Tracheophytes
- Clade: Angiosperms
- Clade: Monocots
- Order: Asparagales
- Family: Iridaceae
- Genus: Moraea
- Species: M. lewisiae

Binomial name
- Moraea lewisiae (Goldblatt) Goldblatt

Synonyms
- Hexaglottis lewisiae Goldblatt

= Moraea lewisiae =

Species of flowering plant

Moraea lewisiae is a species of flowering plant in the family Iridaceae.

== Taxonomy ==
Moraea lewisiae was first formally described in 1971 by the botanist Peter Goldblatt as Hexaglottis lewisiae, named in honor of South African botanist Gwendoline Joyce Lewis, an authority on the family Iridaceae. In 1998, Goldblatt transferred the species to the genus Moraea after phylogenetic studies demonstrated that Hexaglottis was nested within Moraea. The species had widely been known under the misapplied names Moraea flexuosa and Hexaglottis flexuosa. In 1782, Carl Linnaeus the Younger published the name Moraea flexuosa based on a specimen of this plant collected by Carl Peter Thunberg, but he cited Ixia longifolia which Nikolaus Joseph von Jacquin had described in 1777 as a synonym. Under botanical nomenclature rules, this rendered Moraea flexuosa an illegitimate, superfluous renaming of Ixia longifolia (now Moraea longifolia). Because the epithet flexuosa remains nomenclaturally tied to Moraea longifolia, including after Robert Sweet transferred it to Hexaglottis flexuosa in 1830, Goldblatt created Hexaglottis lewisiae in 1971 to provide a valid replacement name for the distinct species.
