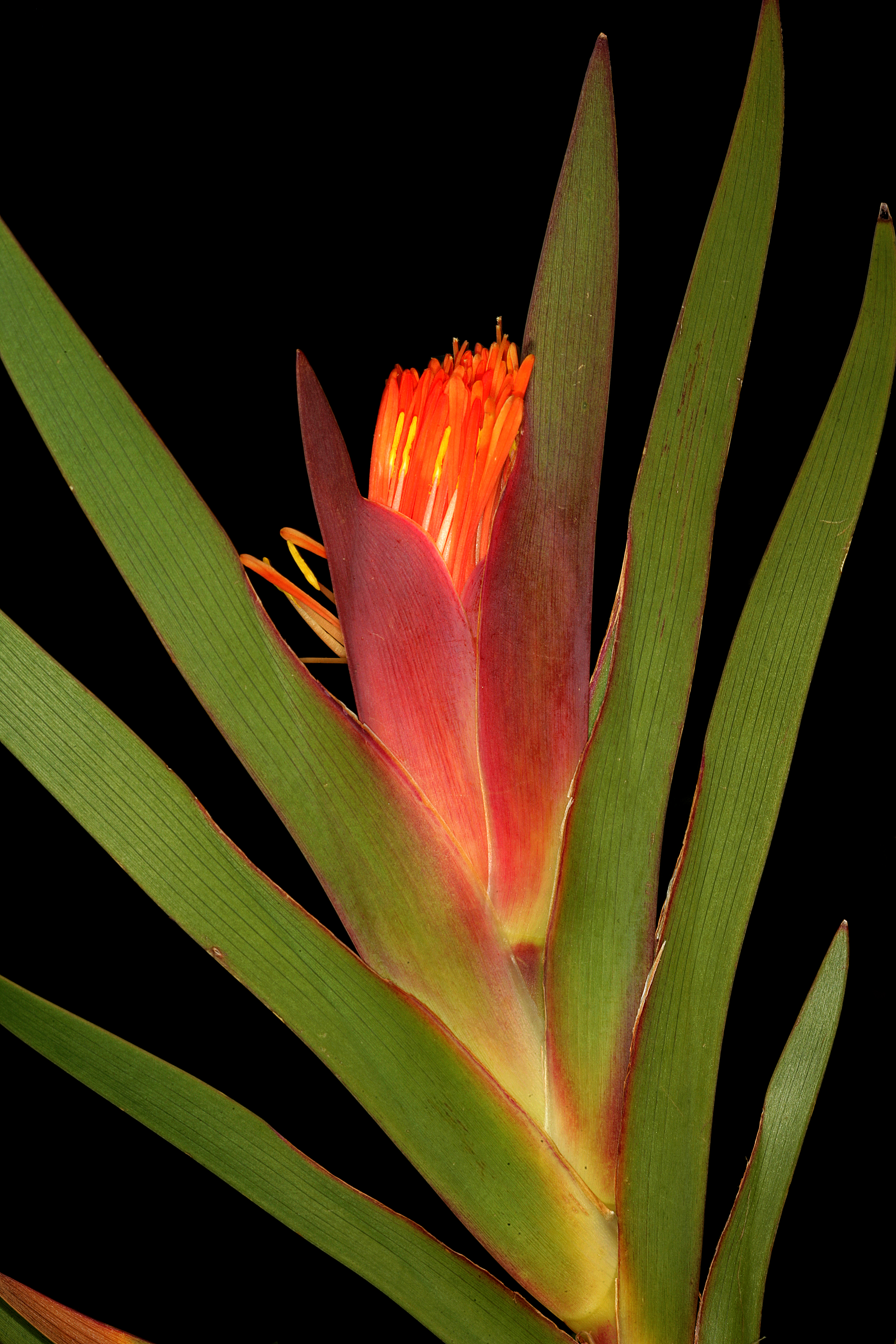
- Klattia stokoei

Scientific classification
- Kingdom: Plantae
- Clade: Tracheophytes
- Clade: Angiosperms
- Clade: Monocots
- Order: Asparagales
- Family: Iridaceae
- Subfamily: Nivenioideae; Eaton

Genera
- Klattia Baker; Nivenia Vent.; Witsenia Thunb.

= Nivenioideae =

Subfamily of flowering plants

Nivenioideae is a subfamily of flowering plants and one of the six subfamilies in the family Iridaceae. It contains three genera, from South Africa which are the only true shrubs in the family (Klattia, Nivenia and Witsenia), It previously included Aristea, Patersonia and also Geosiris, which are now each placed in their own monotypic subfamily.
