= Erica vallis-gratiae =

Scientific classification
- Kingdom: Plantae
- Clade: Tracheophytes
- Clade: Angiosperms
- Clade: Eudicots
- Clade: Asterids
- Order: Ericales
- Family: Ericaceae
- Genus: Erica
- Species: E. vallis-gratiae

Binomial name
- Erica vallis-gratiae Guthrie & Bolus

Species of flowering plant

Erica vallis-gratiae is a plant belonging to the genus Erica and is part of the fynbos. The species is endemic to the Western Cape and occurs in the Riviersonderend Mountains. The habitat is stable and the plant is considered rare.
