= Erica lasciva =

Scientific classification
- Kingdom: Plantae
- Clade: Tracheophytes
- Clade: Angiosperms
- Clade: Eudicots
- Clade: Asterids
- Order: Ericales
- Family: Ericaceae
- Genus: Erica
- Species: E. lasciva

Binomial name
- Erica lasciva Salisb.

Synonyms
- Erica brachycrossa Tausch; Erica exserta Benth.; Erica pachycephala Klotzsch ex Benth.; Ericoides lascivum (Salisb.) Kuntze; Gypsocallis lasciva G.Don; Philippia stokoei L.Guthrie

Species of flowering plant

Erica lasciva is a plant belonging to the genus Erica and is part of the fynbos. The species is endemic to the Western Cape.
