= Thereianthus ixioides =

Scientific classification
- Kingdom: Plantae
- Clade: Tracheophytes
- Clade: Angiosperms
- Clade: Monocots
- Order: Asparagales
- Family: Iridaceae
- Genus: Thereianthus
- Species: T. ixioides

Binomial name
- Thereianthus ixioides G.J.Lewis, (1941)

Synonyms
- Watsonia filifolia E.Mey.

Species of flowering plant

Thereianthus ixioides is a perennial flowering plant and geophyte belonging to the genus Thereianthus and is part of the fynbos. The species is endemic to the Western Cape and occurs in the mountains from Wellington to Franschhoek. It has a range of 313 km^{2} and is not threatened.
