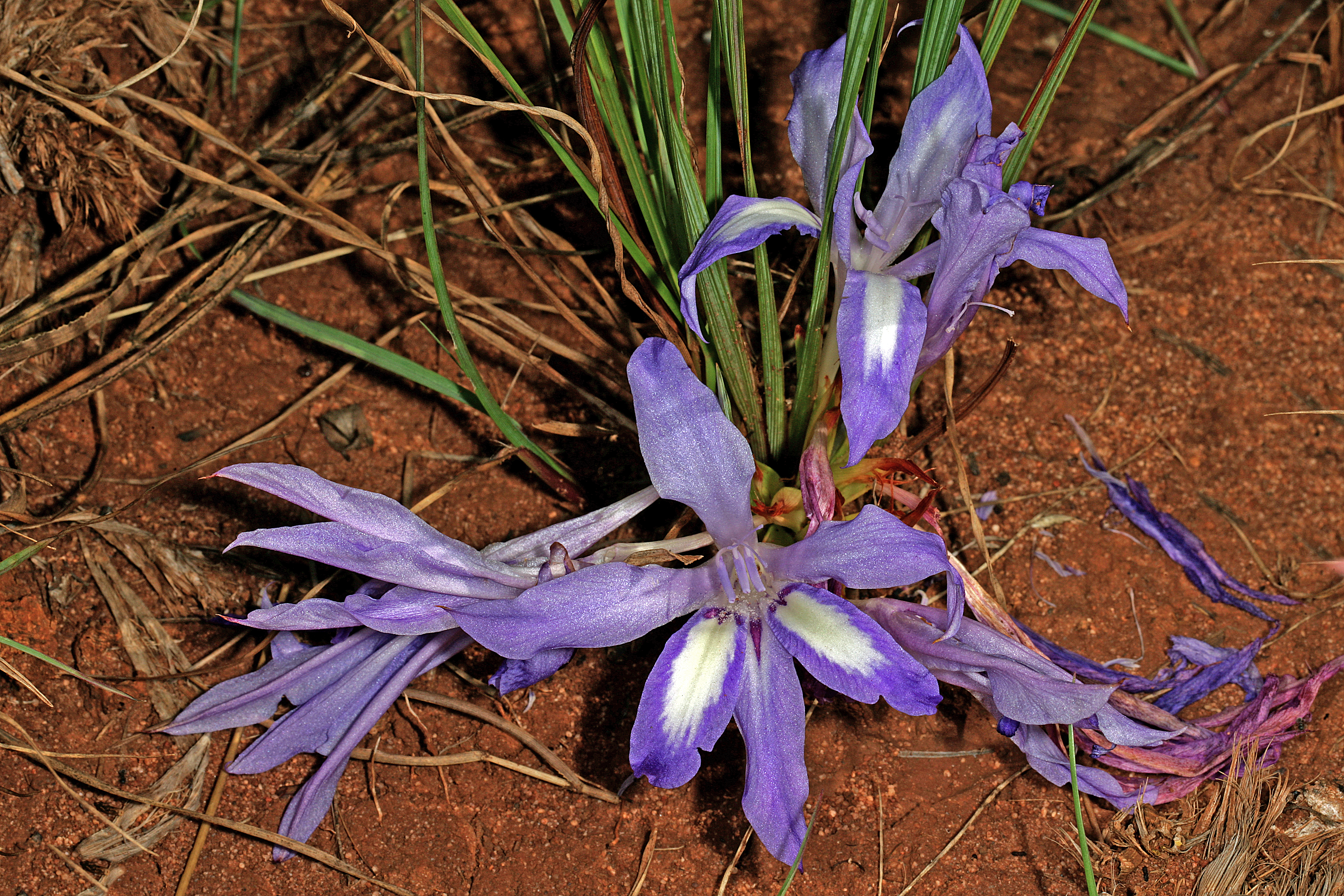

Scientific classification
- Kingdom: Plantae
- Clade: Tracheophytes
- Clade: Angiosperms
- Clade: Monocots
- Order: Asparagales
- Family: Iridaceae
- Genus: Babiana
- Species: B. bainesii

Binomial name
- Babiana bainesii Baker

= Babiana bainesii =

Species of flowering plant

Babiana bainesii is a species of geophyte of 15–25 cm (5.9–9.8 in) high that is assigned to the family Iridaceae. It sometimes grows in tufts. The approximately upright leaf blades appear directly from the ground, are narrow, sword- to line-shaped and have a left and right surface, rather than an upper and lower surface, and far exceed the flowers in length. The leaf blades are pleated. The inflorescence stem is fully underground and often branched. It contains two to eight blue, violet or mauve mirror-symmetrical flowers comprising six tepals. B. bainesii has a wide distribution and occurs in Botswana, Namibia, South Africa, southernmost Zambia and Zimbabwe.

== Description ==
Babiana bainsii is a hairless geophytic perennial plant of 15–25 cm (5.9–9.8 in) high, with its stem underground so that the flowers appear individually from the surface. The leaf blades appear directly from the ground and reach much higher than the flowers. The leaves are line- to sword-shaped, 15–25 cm (5.9–9.8 in) high and 3–10 mm (0.12–0.39 in) wide, are densely hairy, bristly hairy or nearly hairless, and pleated, meaning that the surfaces of the leaf abruptly and repetitively change angle at the location of one of the veins. The outline of the leaf blade is sword- to narrowly lance-shaped and 2.5–4 mm (0.098–0.157 in) wide. The leaf blades are not coiled, and their tips are pointy and do not end in several irregular teeth.

Each of the flowers is subtended by two bracts of 35–60 mm (1.4–2.4 in) long, papery or membranous in consistency, russet-coloured throughout or only at the tips, the outer bracts are slightly longer compared to the inner. The inner bract is forked only at the tip, which is different from many other species that have more deeply forked inner bracts or inner bracts that are split entirely to the base. The inflorescence consists of two to eight blue, violet or mauve mirror-symmetrical flowers born below ground level. The lower lateral tepals are adorned with white blotches that contrast strongly against the background colour. The three stamens are crowding under the dorsal tepal. Flowering occurs between February and May. The flowers are often sweetly scented. The base of each flower consist of a narrowly funnel-shaped tube of 40–55 mm (1.6–2.2 in), exceptionally up to 70 mm (2.8 in) long, that splits into six unequal tepals. The dorsal tepal is 4–5 cm (1.6–2.0 in) long. The upper lateral tepals remain merged about 6 mm (0.24 in) further with the lower lateral tepals than with the dorsal tepals and are 2.5–4 cm (0.98–1.57 in) long, and together form a lower lip. The three stamens are crowded close to the dorsal petal and consist of 10–15 mm (0.39–0.59 in) long filaments topped by 8–10 mm (0.31–0.39 in), occasionally even 12 mm (0.47 in) long, white or cream-coloured anthers. The ovary is hairless and sits on a very short stalk in the lower flowers. It carries a style that divides into three branches opposite the tip of the anthers, and these branches are about 6 mm (0.24 in) long.

=== Differences with similar species ===
Babiana hypogaea also has its entire stems underground, but this species has pale buff or yellow flowers that occur from June to September. B. bainesii has blue, violet or mauve flowers from Februari till April or sometimes May.

== Taxonomy ==
Babiana bainesii was first described for science by John Gilbert Baker in 1876, based on specimens collected by Thomas Baines at Witwatersrand near Johannesburg, in Gauteng, South Africa. In 1904, Baker described a collection by Rudolf Schlechter as B. schlechteri. In 1959, Gwendoline Joyce Lewis described B. hypogea, but this collection is different from B. hypogaea that was described by Baker. She also distinguished B. hypogaea var. longituba and B. hypogaea var. ensifolia. Peter Goldblatt and John Charles Manning regard all these names as synonyms of Babiana bainesii.

== Distribution, ecology and conservation ==
Babiana bainesii has a large distribution that covers the summer rainfall areas of south Africa, from the Great Karoo on the border of the Western Cape and Northern Cape provinces, through North West, Gauteng, Mpumalanga, Limpopo, on to Botswana, Zimbabwe and southernmost Zambia, and in Namibia. It grows in bushland and dry grassland on sandy and stony flats and slopes. It is considered a least concern species.
