= Thereianthus longicollis =

Scientific classification
- Kingdom: Plantae
- Clade: Tracheophytes
- Clade: Angiosperms
- Clade: Monocots
- Order: Asparagales
- Family: Iridaceae
- Genus: Thereianthus
- Species: T. longicollis

Binomial name
- Thereianthus longicollis (Schltr.) G.J.Lewis, (1941)

Synonyms
- Watsonia longicollis (Baker) Schltr.; Watsonia punctata var. filifolia E.Mey. ex Baker

Species of flowering plant

Thereianthus longicollis is a perennial flowering plant and geophyte belonging to the genus Thereianthus and is part of the fynbos. The species is endemic to the Western Cape and occurs in the mountains between Porterville and Wolseley. The plant is considered rare, it has an area of occurrence of 190 km^{2}.
