= Thereianthus juncifolius =

Scientific classification
- Kingdom: Plantae
- Clade: Tracheophytes
- Clade: Angiosperms
- Clade: Monocots
- Order: Asparagales
- Family: Iridaceae
- Genus: Thereianthus
- Species: T. juncifolius

Binomial name
- Thereianthus juncifolius (Baker) G.J.Lewis, (1941)

Synonyms
- Anomatheca calamifolia Klatt; Freesia juncifolia (Baker) Klatt; Ixia zeyheri Baker; Lapeirousia juncifolia (Baker) N.E.Br.; Morphixia juncifolia Baker; Watsonia juncifolia (Baker) Baker

Species of flowering plant

Thereianthus juncifolius is a perennial flowering plant and geophyte belonging to the genus Thereianthus and is part of the fynbos. The species is endemic to the Western Cape and occurs from the Cederberg to the Kogelberg, Kleinrivier Mountains and the western Riviersonderend Mountains.
