= Monactinocephalus =

Scientific classification
- Kingdom: Plantae
- Clade: Tracheophytes
- Clade: Angiosperms
- Clade: Eudicots
- Clade: Asterids
- Order: Asterales
- Family: Asteraceae
- Subfamily: Asteroideae
- Tribe: Inuleae
- Subtribe: Inulinae
- Genus: Monactinocephalus; Klatt

Species
- Monactinocephalus paniculatus Klatt; Monactinocephalus shirensis (Oliv.) D.Gut.Larr., Santos-Vicente, Anderb., E.Rico & M.M.Mart.Ort.

Synonyms
- Inulaster Sch.Bip. ex A.Rich.

Genus of flowering plants

Monactinocephalus is a genus of flowering plants in the family Asteraceae. It includes two species native to tropical Africa, ranging from Ethiopia to the Republic of the Congo and South Africa.

- Monactinocephalus paniculatus Klatt
- Monactinocephalus shirensis (Oliv.) D.Gut.Larr., Santos-Vicente, Anderb., E.Rico & M.M.Mart.Ort.
