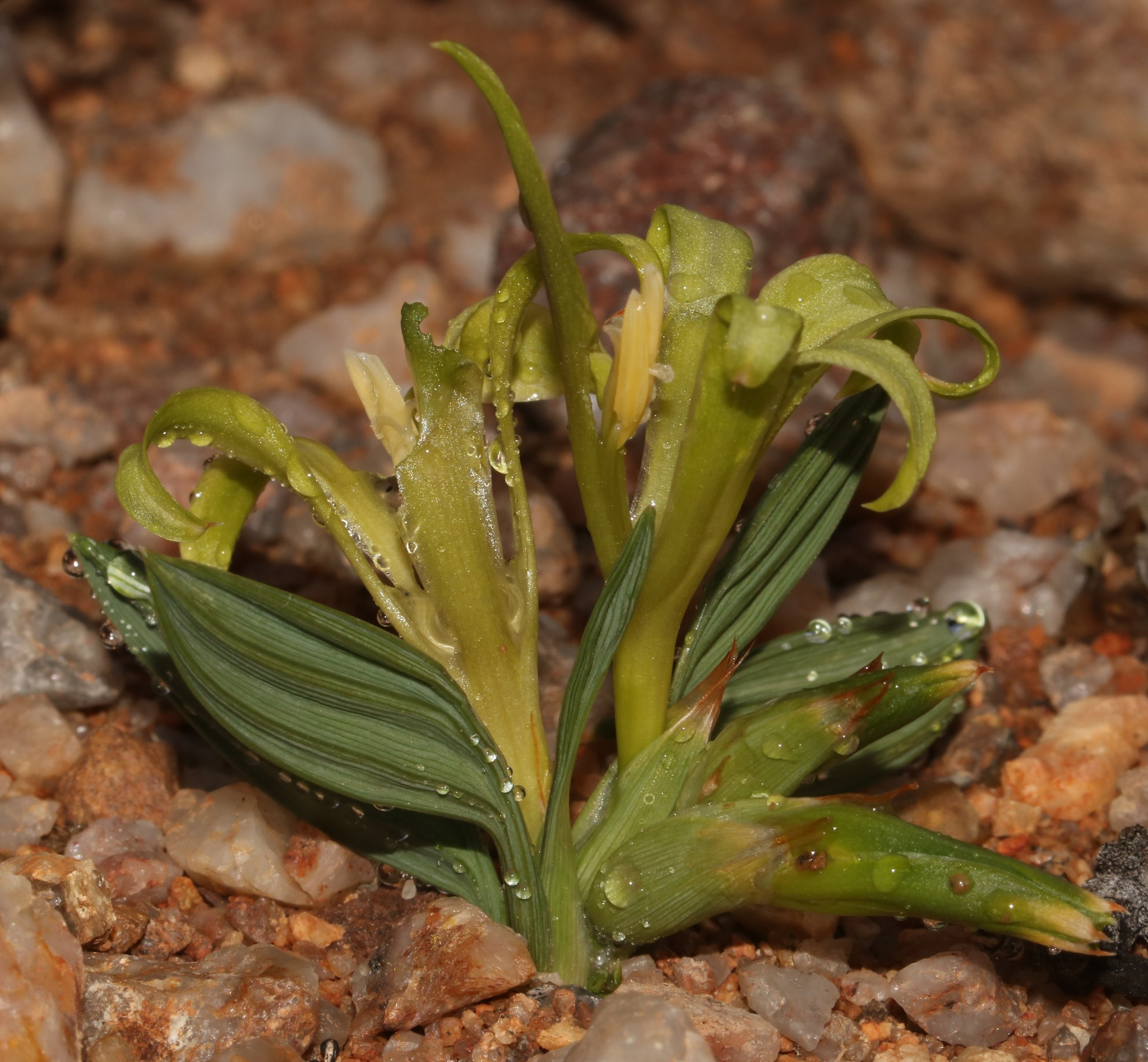

Scientific classification
- Kingdom: Plantae
- Clade: Embryophytes
- Clade: Tracheophytes
- Clade: Angiosperms
- Clade: Monocots
- Order: Asparagales
- Family: Iridaceae
- Genus: Babiana
- Species: B. horizontalis

Binomial name
- Babiana horizontalis G.J.Lewis

= Babiana horizontalis =

Species of flowering plant

Babiana horizontalis is a species of geophyte of up to 5 cm (2.0 in) high that is assigned to the family Iridaceae. It has leaves that consist of a sheath and a blade that are at a right angle with each other. The leaf blades are lance-shaped and have a left and right surface, rather than an upper and lower surface. The leaf blades have three or four prominent ribs, hardly pleated and glabrous except for some long hairs along the upper margin. The inflorescence contains two to five zygomorphic lilac or olive yellow flowers. Three stamens are crowding under the upper lip. Flowering occurs in June and July. B. horizontalis may be found in the Northern Cape province of South Africa.

== Description ==
Babiana horizontalis is a dwarf species that may grow up to 5 cm in height. The leaves consist of a sheath that encloses the sheaths of higher leaves and of a blade that is at an angle to the sheath. The sheaths of the leaves (officially called pseudo-petiole) are at a right angle with the leaf blades. The glabrous leaf blades are held horizontally, lance-shaped, 3–4 cm (1.2–1.6 in) long, 1.3 cm (0.51 in) high, hardly pleated, with 3-4 prominent ribs and a few long hairs on the upper margin. The flowers are sometimes single, but mostly with 2–5 on a smooth, unbrached stem that rises 2–3 cm above the surface at most and is surrounded by a collar of thick fibres at its base. Each flower is subtended by two bracts, both about 2.5 cm long. The inner bract is forked at the tip, which is pale and dry. The flowers are entirely lilac or olive yellow, or the outer tepals are lilac and the inner yellow. The flower has a narrowly funnel-shaped perianth tube of about 25 mm (0.98 in) long and splits into six tepals. The tepals are unequal in length, the one next to the cluster of anthers is about 25 mm (0.98 in) long, while those on the opposite side of the flower reach 20–23 mm (0.79–0.91 in). The three stamens have filaments of 16–17 mm (0.63–0.67 in) long and are topped by anthers of about 6 mm (0.24 in). The ovary is hairless and the style divides into three branches just above the tips of the anthers.

== Taxonomy ==
The South African botanist Gwendoline Joyce Lewis described Babiana horizontalis in her revision of the genus published in 1959 based on a specimen collected in 1900 from Anenous Pass, between Steinkopf and Port Nolloth, Northern Cape.

== Distribution ==
B. horizontalis grows on granite outcrops in the southern Richtersveld, Northern Cape province of South Africa. The species is regarded as vulnerable due to being known from seven locations only and suffering from severe overgrazing at some of these locations.
