= Erica ribisaria =

Scientific classification
- Kingdom: Plantae
- Clade: Tracheophytes
- Clade: Angiosperms
- Clade: Eudicots
- Clade: Asterids
- Order: Ericales
- Family: Ericaceae
- Genus: Erica
- Species: E. ribisaria

Binomial name
- Erica ribisaria Guthrie & Bolus

Species of flowering plant

Erica ribisaria is a plant belonging to the genus Erica and is part of the fynbos. The species is endemic to the Western Cape and occurs from Houwhoek to Kleinmond. There are currently three fragmented subpopulations remaining, two of which are threatened by invasive species. The third is threatened by road maintenance work and fire prevention belts.
