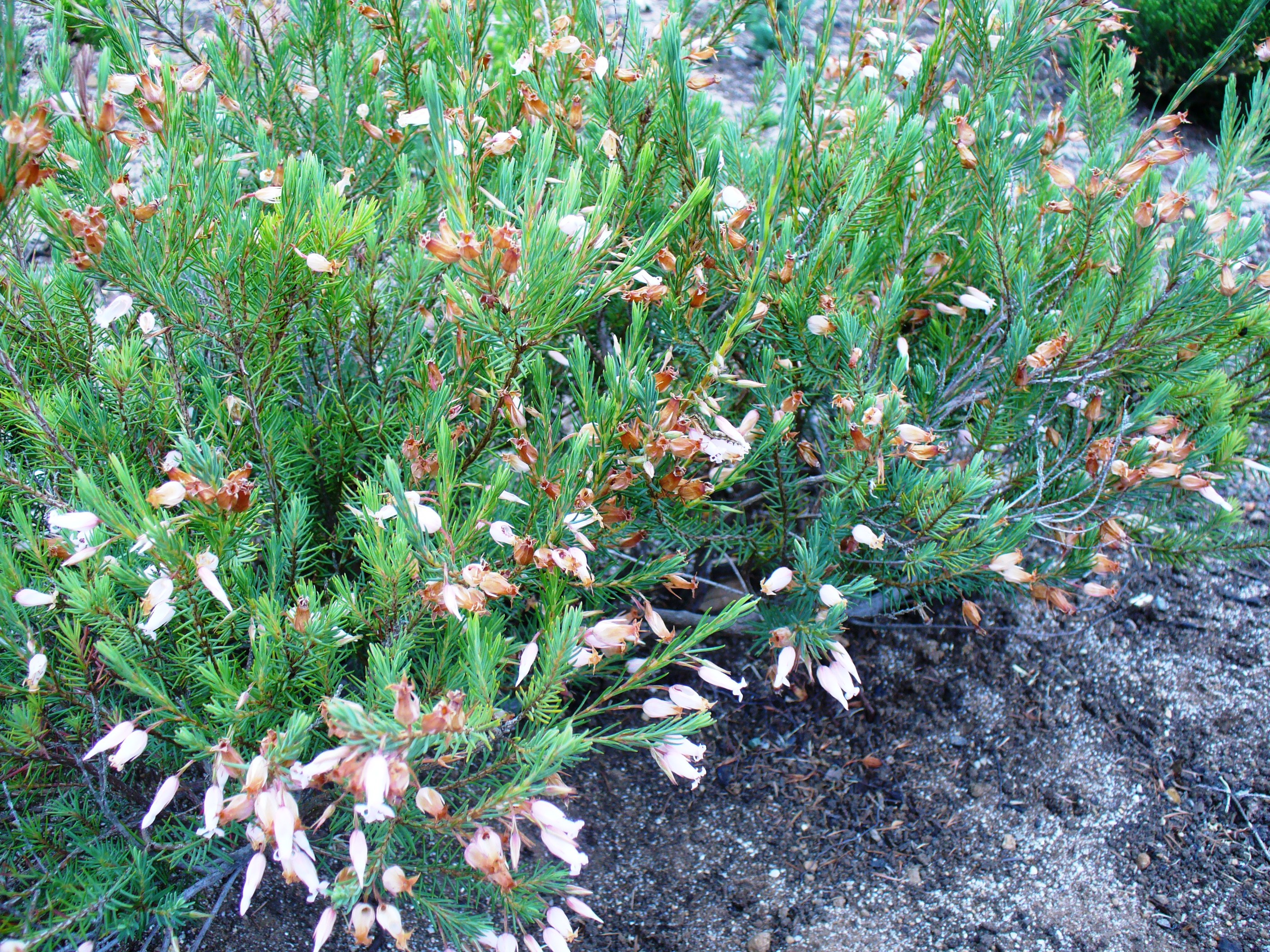

Scientific classification
- Kingdom: Plantae
- Clade: Tracheophytes
- Clade: Angiosperms
- Clade: Eudicots
- Clade: Asterids
- Order: Ericales
- Family: Ericaceae
- Genus: Erica
- Species: E. georgica

Binomial name
- Erica georgica Guthrie & Bolus, (1905)

= Erica georgica =

Species of flowering plant

Erica georgica, the George heath, is a plant belonging to the genus Erica and forming part of the fynbos. The species' scientific name was first published by Francis Guthrie & Harry Bolus. The plant is endemic to the Western Cape.
