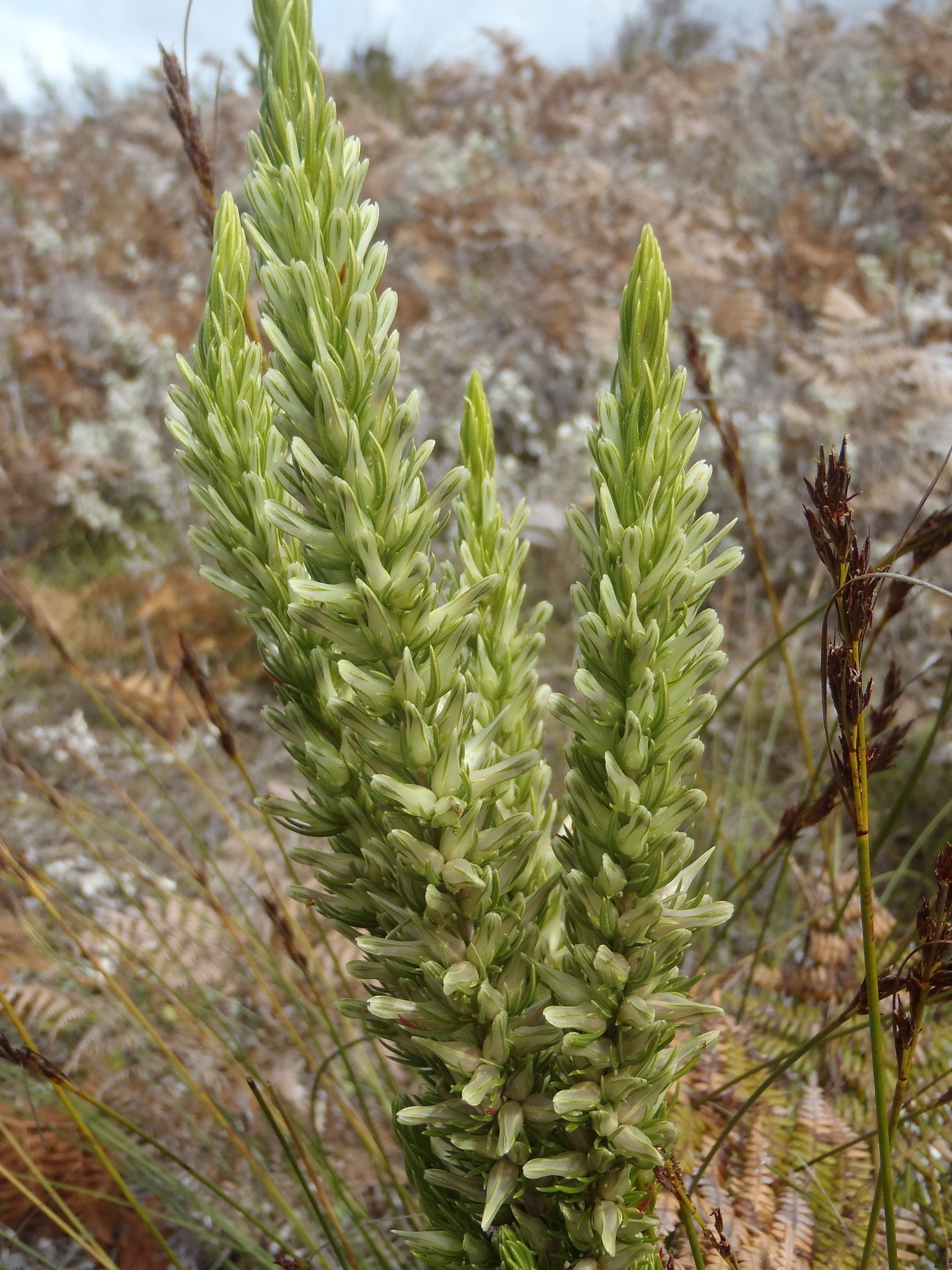

Scientific classification
- Kingdom: Plantae
- Clade: Tracheophytes
- Clade: Angiosperms
- Clade: Eudicots
- Clade: Asterids
- Order: Ericales
- Family: Ericaceae
- Genus: Erica
- Species: E. nabea

Binomial name
- Erica nabea Guthrie & Bolus

Synonyms
- Macnabia montana (Lehm. ex Klotzsch) Benth.; Nabea montana Lehm. ex Klotzsch

= Erica nabea =

Species of flowering plant

Erica nabea, the sepal heath or MacNab’s heath, is a plant belonging to the genus Erica and is part of the fynbos. The species is endemic to the Eastern Cape and Western Cape.
