= Thereianthus bracteolatus =

Scientific classification
- Kingdom: Plantae
- Clade: Tracheophytes
- Clade: Angiosperms
- Clade: Monocots
- Order: Asparagales
- Family: Iridaceae
- Genus: Thereianthus
- Species: T. bracteolatus

Binomial name
- Thereianthus bracteolatus (Lam.) G.J.Lewis, (1941)

Synonyms
- Sien Sinonieme

Species of flowering plant

Thereianthus bracteolatus is a perennial flowering plant and geophyte belonging to the genus Thereianthus and is part of the fynbos. The species is endemic to the Western Cape. It occurs in the Cape Peninsula, eastwards over the Hottentots Holland Mountains, Kogelberg to the coastal mountains at Bredasdorp. The plant has lost some of its habitat in the Cape Peninsula but the rest is safe in the Table Mountain National Park. Some subpopulations between Kleinmond and Bredasdorp are threatened by invasive plants.
