= Thereianthus montanus =

Scientific classification
- Kingdom: Plantae
- Clade: Tracheophytes
- Clade: Angiosperms
- Clade: Monocots
- Order: Asparagales
- Family: Iridaceae
- Genus: Thereianthus
- Species: T. montanus

Binomial name
- Thereianthus montanus J.C.Manning & Goldblatt, (2004)

Species of flowering plant

Thereianthus montanus is a species of flowering plant in the family Iridaceae. It is a perennial geophyte and is part of the fynbos ecoregion. The species is endemic to the Western Cape and occurs in the Riviersonderend Mountains near Pilaarkop. The plant has a range of less than 14 km^{2} and there are two subpopulations. It grows on the southern slopes at altitudes of 1500 m and is threatened by invasive plants.
