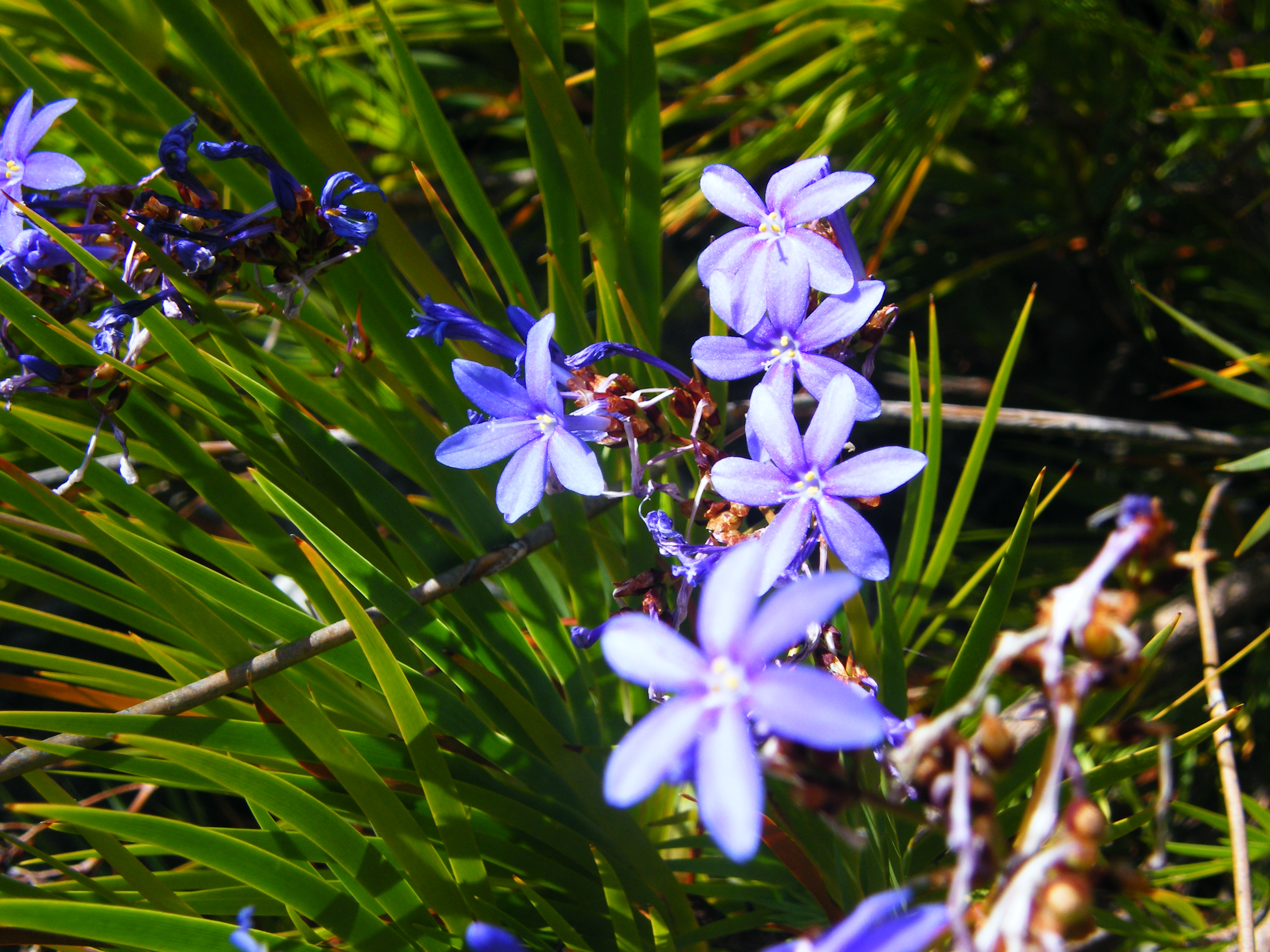
- Nivenia corymbosa

Scientific classification
- Kingdom: Plantae
- Clade: Tracheophytes
- Clade: Angiosperms
- Clade: Monocots
- Order: Asparagales
- Family: Iridaceae
- Subfamily: Nivenioideae
- Genus: Nivenia; Ventenat

Type species
- Nivenia corymbosa (Ker Gawler) Baker

Synonyms
- Genlisia Rchb.

= Nivenia =

Genus of flowering plants

Nivenia is a genus of flowering plants in the family Iridaceae first described as a genus in 1808. Species in the genus are restricted in distribution to an area in the Cape Province of South Africa.

The genus name is a tribute to the Scottish botanist James Niven (1774–1826), one of the first to collect the genus.

Species

- Nivenia argentea Goldblatt
- Nivenia binata Klatt
- Nivenia concinna N.E.Br - Viljoens Pass
- Nivenia corymbosa (Ker Gawl.) Baker
- Nivenia dispar N.E.Br - Olifantskloof
- Nivenia fruticosa (L.f.) Baker - Langeberg Mountains
- Nivenia inaequalis Goldblatt & J.C.Manning
- Nivenia levynsiae Weim.
- Nivenia parviflora Goldblatt
- Nivenia stenosiphon Goldblatt
- Nivenia stokoei (L.Guthrie) N.E.Br. - Caledon
