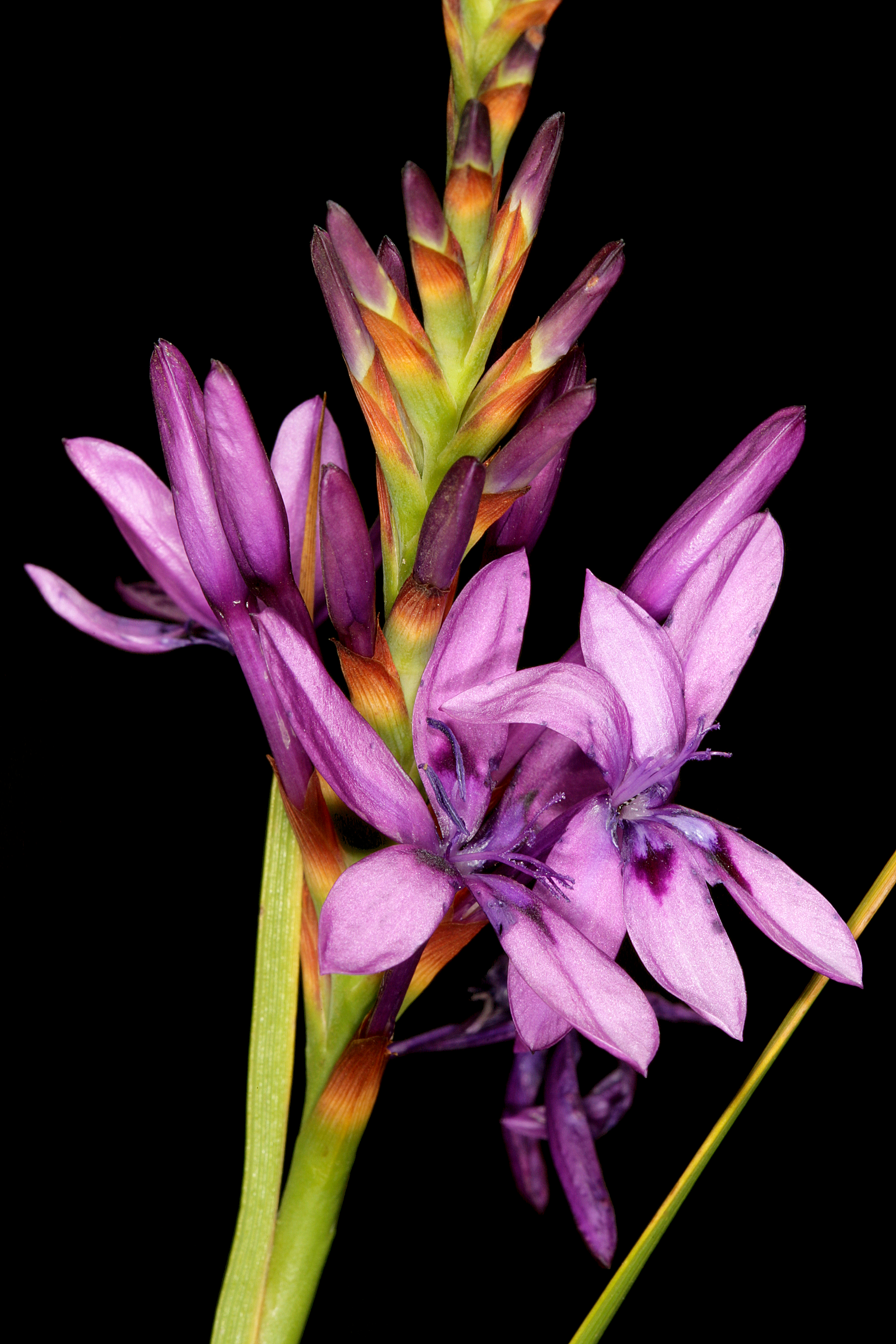

Scientific classification
- Kingdom: Plantae
- Clade: Tracheophytes
- Clade: Angiosperms
- Clade: Monocots
- Order: Asparagales
- Family: Iridaceae
- Genus: Thereianthus
- Species: T. spicatus

Binomial name
- Thereianthus spicatus (L.) G.J.Lewis, (1941)

Synonyms
- Beilia spicata (L.) Eckl. ex Kuntze; Gladiolus alopecuroides Pers.; Gladiolus rubens Vahl; Gladiolus spicatus L.; Ixia spicata (L.) Willd.; Micranthus spicatus (L.) Heynh.; Paulomagnusia spicata (L.) Kuntze; Thereianthus spicatus var. linearifolius G.J.Lewis; Watsonia punctata var. zeyheri Baker; Watsonia rubens (Vahl) Ker Gawl.; Watsonia spicata (L.) Ker Gawl.

= Thereianthus spicatus =

Species of flowering plant

Thereianthus spicatus is a perennial flowering plant and geophyte belonging to the genus Thereianthus and is part of the fynbos. The species is endemic to the Western Cape and occurs from the Piketberg and the Groot Winterhoek Mountains to the Palmiet River Estuary and the Riviersonderend Mountains. It grows from sea level to altitudes of 1000 m.
