= Klattia flava =

Scientific classification
- Kingdom: Plantae
- Clade: Tracheophytes
- Clade: Angiosperms
- Clade: Monocots
- Order: Asparagales
- Family: Iridaceae
- Genus: Klattia
- Species: K. flava

Binomial name
- Klattia flava (G.J.Lewis) Goldblatt, (1993)

Synonyms
- Klattia partita var. flava G.J.Lewis

Species of flowering plant

Klattia flava is a plant endemic to the Western Cape and forms part of the fynbos. The species occurs from the Hottentots Holland Mountains to Bainskloof. The plant has a range of 400 km² and it is estimated that there are less than 1000 individual plants left. The plant re-sprouts after fire and is threatened by water abstraction.
