= Thereianthus intermedius =

Scientific classification
- Kingdom: Plantae
- Clade: Tracheophytes
- Clade: Angiosperms
- Clade: Monocots
- Order: Asparagales
- Family: Iridaceae
- Genus: Thereianthus
- Species: T. intermedius

Binomial name
- Thereianthus intermedius J.C.Manning & Goldblatt, (2011)

Synonyms
- Thereianthus lapeyrouseoides var. elatior G.J.Lewis

Species of flowering plant

Thereianthus intermedius is a species of flowering plant in the family Iridaceae. It is perennial geophyte and is part of the fynbos ecoregion. The species is endemic to the Western Cape and occurs from Piketberg to Koue Bokkeveld and the upper Olifants River Valley. The plant has a distribution area of 1760 km^{2} and grows in mountainous areas.
