= Thereianthus elandsmontanus =

Scientific classification
- Kingdom: Plantae
- Clade: Tracheophytes
- Clade: Angiosperms
- Clade: Monocots
- Order: Asparagales
- Family: Iridaceae
- Genus: Thereianthus
- Species: T. elandsmontanus

Binomial name
- Thereianthus elandsmontanus Goldblatt & J.C.Manning, (2011)

Species of flowering plant

Thereianthus elandsmontanus is a species of flowering plant in the family Iridaceae. It is a perennial geophyte and is part of the fynbos and renosterveld. The species is endemic to the Western Cape and occurs at the foot of the Elandskloof Mountain, near Hermon. There is only one subpopulation, which was only discovered in 2011 after a controlled fire of fynbos between fields. There is a possibility that other subpopulations exist. The plant is threatened by lack of fire, invasive plants, absence of insects that fertilize the plant, fertilizers and insecticides
