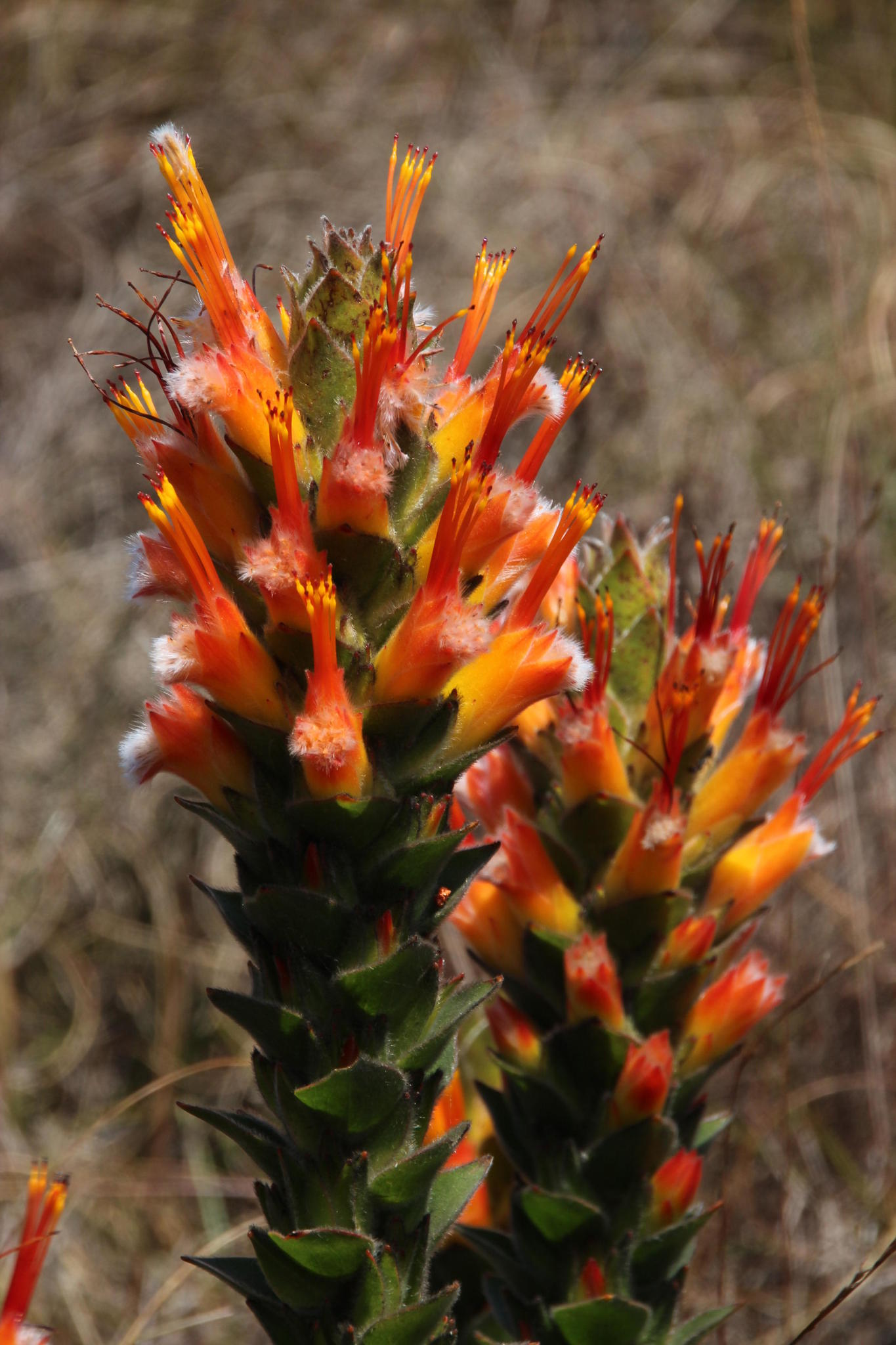

Conservation status
- Vulnerable (IUCN 3.1)

Scientific classification
- Kingdom: Plantae
- Clade: Tracheophytes
- Clade: Angiosperms
- Clade: Eudicots
- Order: Proteales
- Family: Proteaceae
- Genus: Mimetes
- Species: M. capitulatus

Binomial name
- Mimetes capitulatus R.Br.

Synonyms
- Protea capitulata

= Mimetes capitulatus =

Species of plant from South Africa

Mimetes capitulatus is an evergreen, upright, rounded shrub of about 2 m (7 ft) high, from the family Proteaceae. It has greyish green, lance- to egg-shaped leaves ending in a thickened tip. The flower heads and subtending leaves form a cylindric inflorescence, topped by ordinary, more or less upright leaves. Each primarily orange flowerhead contains 10–13 flowers with conspicuously scarlet styles, yellow under the narrow hourglass-like pollen presenter at its tip. Flowers can usually be found from mid-June till December, peaking in August. It is called conical pagoda in English and skraalstompie in Afrikaans.

== Description ==
Mimetes capitulatus is an evergreen, rounded shrub of about 2 m (7 ft) high that develops from a single trunk, and has a densely branched crown. Older specimens also develop several, usually unbranched straggling shoots. The branches are 5–8 mm (0.20–0.32 in) thick and are initially covered with greyish felty hairs that wear off later on. The leaves are set alternately along the branches, slightly overlapping at an upward angle. They lack stipules and leaf stalks, are lance- to egg-shaped in outline, 2–3.5 cm (0.8–1.4 in) long and ¾–2 cm (0.3–0.8 in) wide, with an entire margin ending sharply pointy in one thickened tip. The surface is initially covered in rough felty hairs, which eventually are lost.

The inflorescence is broadly cylinder-shaped, 6–10 cm (2.3–4 in) long and 6–8 cm (2.3-3.3 in) in diameter, topped by more or less upright leaves not unlike all other leaves. In the axils of the higher leaves are flower heads each containing ten to thirteen (most frequently eleven) flowers, the subtending leaves broadly oval, 2.5–4 cm (1–1¾ in) long and 1.5–2 (0.7–0.8 in) broad, set with rough hairs, and with a row of rough hairs along the margin, sometimes flushed reddish. The outer whorl of bracts that encircle the flower heads are upright, softly hairy, greenish white in colour but flushed with red, very narrowly lance-shaped to line-shaped, 1.5–2.5 cm (0.6–1.0 in) long and 3–6 mm (0.12–0.24 in) wide, the inner whorl lance-shaped to narrowly lance-shaped, with a sharply pointy tip, 1.5–4 cm (1.7–1.8 in) long and 0.8–1.5 cm (0.3–0.7 in) wide, orange to red in colour, hyaline in consistency and hairless towards the tip, powdery hairy towards the base.

The bract subtending the individual flower is orange to red in colour, narrowly lance-shaped with a pointy tip and 3–3.5 cm (about 1¼ in) long, about 0.5–1 cm (0.3 in) wide, hairless at the base and powdery hairy towards the tip, with a row of hairs along the edge. The 4-merous perianth is 3–4 cm (1.2–1.6 in) long. The lower part, that remains merged when the flower is open, is slightly inflated and hairless at the base, and about 5–7 mm (0.20–0.28 in) long. The segments in the middle part (or claws), are thread-shaped and silky hairy. The segments in the upper part (or limbs), which enclosed the pollen presenter in the bud, are line-shaped with a pointy tip and covered in dense silky hairs. The anthers are directly merged to the limbs, lack a filament, and are about 4 mm (0.16 in) long. From the centre of the perianth emerges the style of 4.5–5.5 cm (1.8–2.2 in) long, growing and curving when the flower opens and stretching out later on. It is scarlet in colour with yellow near the tip. The thickened part at the tip of the style called pollen presenter is 5–7 mm (0.2–0.3 in) long, with a narrow hourglass-like shape, with a thickened ring at the base, a narrow middle part and a cone- to head-shaped tip that contains the sigmatic groove across the middle. The ovary is silky hairy and about 2 mm long (0.08 in). It is subtended by four fleshy, blunt line-shaped scales of about 2 mm (0.08 in) long. The fruit is powdery hairy, cylinder-shaped, 5–6 mm (0.20–0.24 in) long and 2–3 mm (0.08–0.12 in) in diameter.

== Taxonomy ==
As far as known, the first person to collect the conical pagoda for science was William Roxburgh, who came across this species in 1798 or 1799. He however did not specify the location of his find. The species was described by Robert Brown in 1810, who named it Mimetes capitulatus, in a paper called On the natural order of plants called Proteaceae. In 1816, Jean Poiret collapsed several genera, including Mimetes and made the new combination Protea capitulata.

=== Naming ===
The species name capitulatus means little head.

== Distribution, habitat and ecology ==
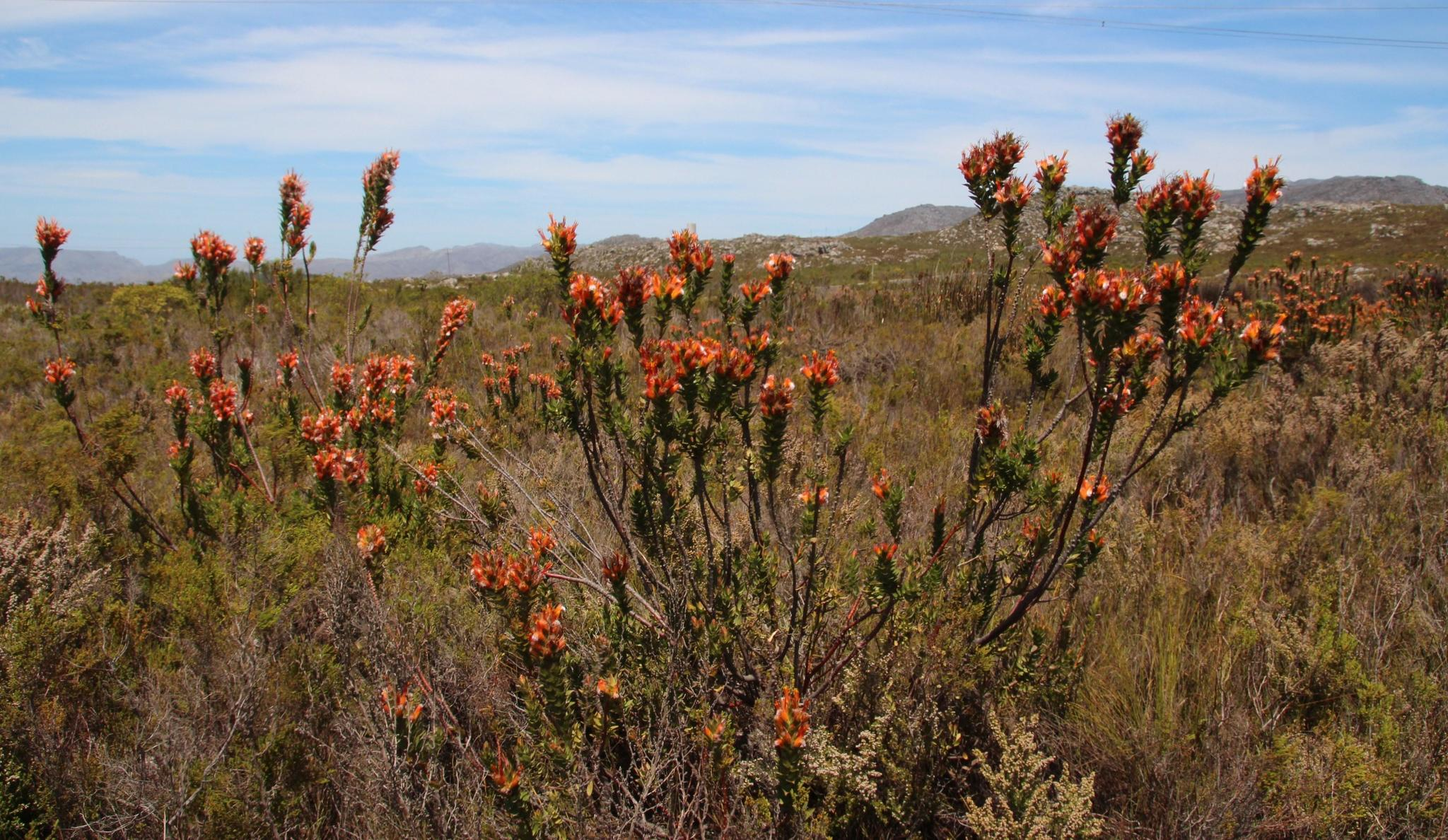
Habit

The five known populations of the conical pagoda can be found in the Kogelberg, Kleinrivier and Groenland Mountains, ranges adjacent or at least near the sea, at 600–1200 m (2000–4000 ft) altitude. The average annual precipitation is about 1500 mm (60 in) mostly falling during the southern winter. Here, it grows on permanently moist, sometimes outright swampy peaty soils, near the ridge or peak on the cool, southeastern slope in a vegetation that also contains the Restionid Elegia mucronata, Klattia partita, and the Bruniaceae species Berzelia ecklonii and Brunia alopecuroides. In these locations clouds condensate and cause precipitation during the otherwise dry summer months.

The species is pollinated by birds, mostly the malachite sunbird Nectarinia famosa, southern double-collared sunbird Cinnyris chalybeus and orange-breasted sunbird Anthobaphes violacea. It flowers from mid June to November, with a peak in August, and produces copious amounts of nectar. The fruits ripen one at a time, two to six months after flowering and fall to the ground. They are collected by native ants that carry the fruits to their underground nest, where the ants bread is eaten and the seeds remain protected. The seeds germinate after an overhead fieldfire. Plants do not survive fires.

== Conservation ==
The conical pagoda is considered an endangered species, due to the very limited areas where its populations occupy 29 km^{2} (11 sq mi) within a distribution area of 541 km^{2} (209 sq mi) and its decreasing population. Negative impacts may arise from too high frequency wildfires, flower picking, and habitat destruction.
