= Thereianthus bulbiferus =

Scientific classification
- Kingdom: Plantae
- Clade: Tracheophytes
- Clade: Angiosperms
- Clade: Monocots
- Order: Asparagales
- Family: Iridaceae
- Genus: Thereianthus
- Species: T. bulbiferus

Binomial name
- Thereianthus bulbiferus Goldblatt & J.C.Manning, (2011)

Species of flowering plant

Thereianthus bulbiferus is a species of flowering plant in the family Iridaceae. It is a perennial geophyte and is part of the fynbos and renosterveld. The species is endemic to the Western Cape and occurs from Piketberg to Gouda and Paarl. The plant has lost 70% of its habitat to crop cultivation, urban development and uncontrolled fires, the plant requires fire to flower.
