= Witsenia =

Scientific classification
- Kingdom: Plantae
- Clade: Tracheophytes
- Clade: Angiosperms
- Clade: Monocots
- Order: Asparagales
- Family: Iridaceae
- Subfamily: Nivenioideae
- Genus: Witsenia; Thunb.
- Species: W. maura

Binomial name
- Witsenia maura (L.) Thunb.

Synonyms
- Antholyza maura L.

Genus of flowering plants

Witsenia is a genus of flowering plants in the family Iridaceae, with one known species, Witsenia maura, or bokmakierie tail. It is an evergreen shrub of 1–3 m (3.3–9.8 ft) tall that grows from woody rootstock. It has woody, rarely branching stems that are flattened near the top, 3–5 mm (0.12–0.20 in) wide, and densely set with long-lived leaves in opposing rows, and yellow and black long spindle-shaped, upright flowers in pairs. It is endemic to Cape Province in western South Africa, where it grows along seeps.

== Description ==
Bokmakierie tail is an evergreen shrub of 1–3 m (3.3–9.8 ft) tall that grows from woody rootstock. It has woody, rarely branching stems that are flattened near the top, 3–5 mm (0.12–0.20 in) wide, and densely set with long-lived leaves in opposing rows, getting round in cross-section with age, eventually 10–15 mm (0.39–0.59 in) in diameter and covered in leaf scars. The leaves are dark green, sword-shaped, 10–15 cm (3.9–5.9 in) long and 4–7 mm (0.16–0.28 in) wide, laterally compressed and so having right and left rather than upper and lower surfaces. The inflorescences have branches of 2–4 mm (0.079–0.157 in) long each set with three to five pointy green to yellow bracts of 35–40 mm (1.4–1.6 in) long that cover the lower half of the tubes of each pair of flowers. The perianth is 8-8½ cm long and consists of six tepals that are merged into a tube for 5-5½ cm and separates into free lobes of 2½-3 cm at the top. The perianth tube widens from about 3 mm in diameter at its base to about 6 mm where it splits in the free tepal lobes. It is pale green or yellowish except for the upper quarter that is dark green shaded black. The free parts of the tepals are erect and connivent, black in colour except for the upper half that can be seen without deconstructing the flower, which is pale green and covered in dense yellow velvety hairs. The free part of the tepal has a limb of 10-12 mm long, widening in a blade The three anthers are nestled in a hollow in the outer tepals. The tepals are firmly presssed agains each other, with only the style emerging 2-3 mm when flowering but later retracting to within the perianth. The stigma is hollow at the very tip and splits into three lobes. The fruit is a like an upside-down egg—narrowest at the base (stem attachment) and widest near the tip—with a length significantly greater than its width of 9-12 mm long, eventually containing one flattened, shield-shaped seed of 5-6 mm long in each of the three chambers. Cells have 8 pairs of Homologous chromosomes (2n=16)

== Taxonomy ==
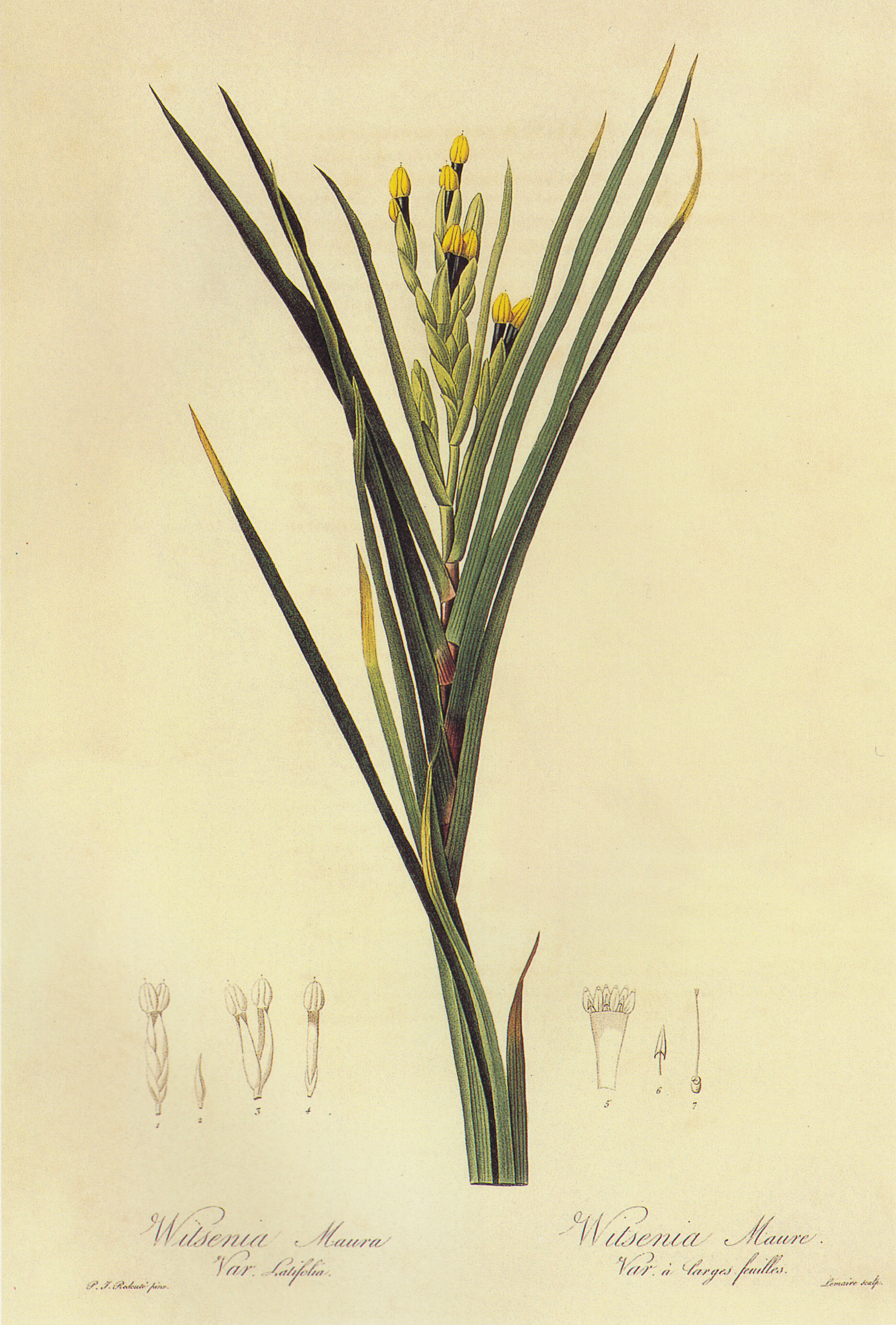
copperplate engraving, hand-coloured with watercolours

Bokmakierie tail was first described by Carl Linnaeus in his book Mantissa Plantarum Altera in 1771 and he gave it the scientific name Antholyza maura. His student, Carl Peter Thunberg thought the species sufficiently different to erect a new genus for it and so created the new combination Witsenia maura in 1782. In 1789, Jean-Baptiste Lamarck described the species and gave it the name Ixia disticha. In 1812, Richard Anthony Salisbury, created the name Witsenia tomentosa, but without a description, rendering it invalid. Witsenia is assigned to the Iridaceae family and Nivenioideae subfamily. The genus was named in honor of Nicolaes Witsen, an administrator of the Dutch East India Company and cartographer who financially supported the botanical explorations of Thunberg in both South Africa and Japan.

== Distribution, ecology and conservation ==
Bokmakierie tail occurs in the south western corner of the Western Cape province of South Africa, between Cape of Good Hope and Silvermine Nature Reserve on the Cape Peninsula in the west, through the Kogelberg, Groenland mountains, Hottentots Holland Mountains, Babilonstoringberge, the Kleinrivier Mountains and the Akkedisberg in the east. It grows on peat or in marshes. The flowers of bokmakierie tail have firmly closed tepals that do not allow for insects to enter. Malachite sunbirds are the only pollinator that has been seen visiting the flowers. The flowers contain a large amount of very liquid nectar, a trait typical for flowers pollinated by birds. A studie from 1989 however suggests that bird pollination if it occurs at all is ineffective, and that insect pollination, in particular by earwigs, may be the dominant mechanism. Seeds float and it is suggested that these are distributed wy water, consistent with the fact that seeds are released during the wet season The continued survival of the species was considered to be of least concern in 2016, even though the population was in decline due to by coastal development, an unsuitable fire regime, and competition by invasive species.
