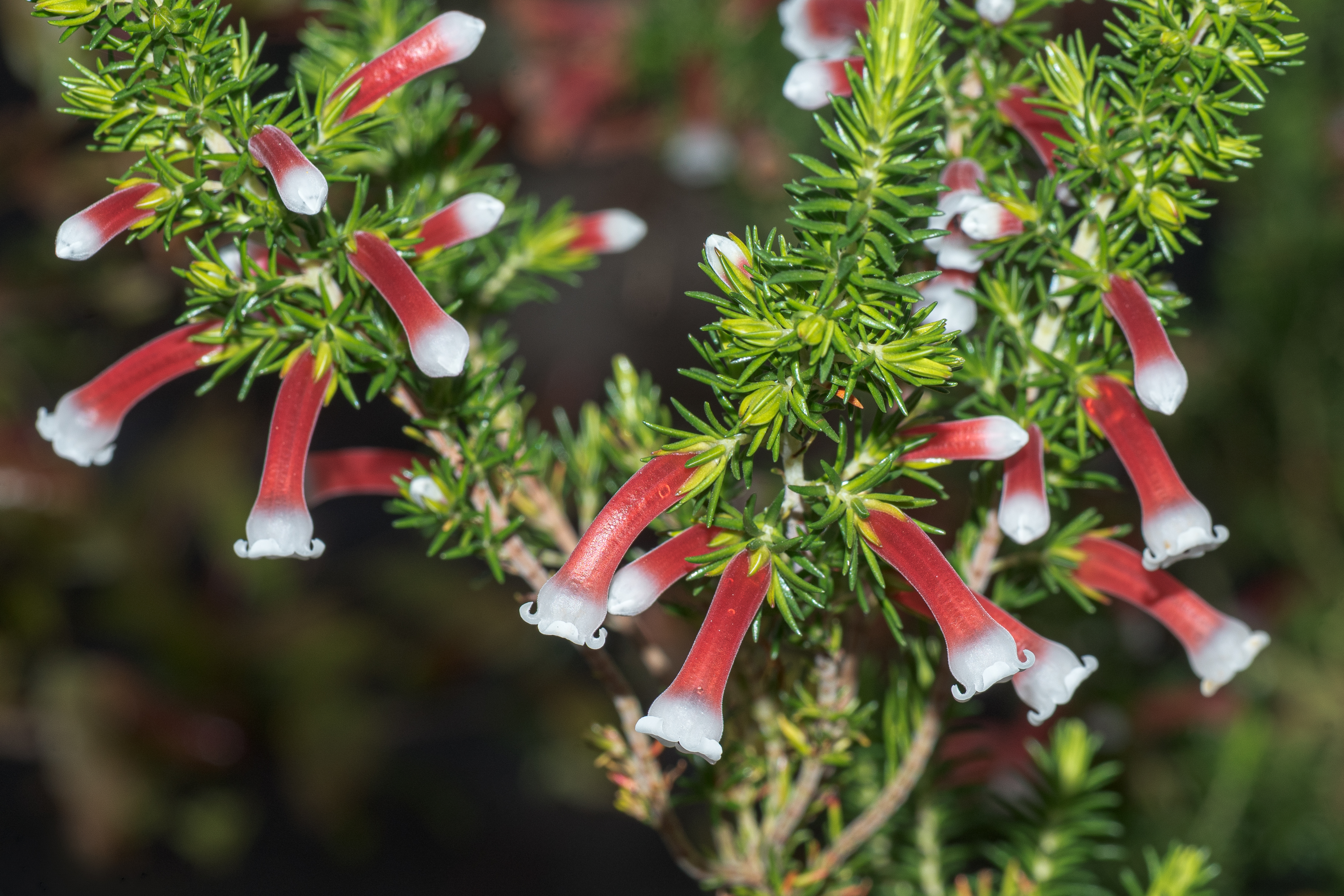

Scientific classification
- Kingdom: Plantae
- Clade: Tracheophytes
- Clade: Angiosperms
- Clade: Eudicots
- Clade: Asterids
- Order: Ericales
- Family: Ericaceae
- Genus: Erica
- Species: E. leucotrachela

Binomial name
- Erica leucotrachela H.A.Baker

= Erica leucotrachela =

Species of flowering plant

Erica leucotrachela, the white-tip heath, is a plant belonging to the genus Erica and is part of the fynbos. The species is endemic to the Western Cape.

The plant has one subspecies:Erica leucotrachela subsp. monicae E.G.H.Oliv. & I.M.Oliv.
