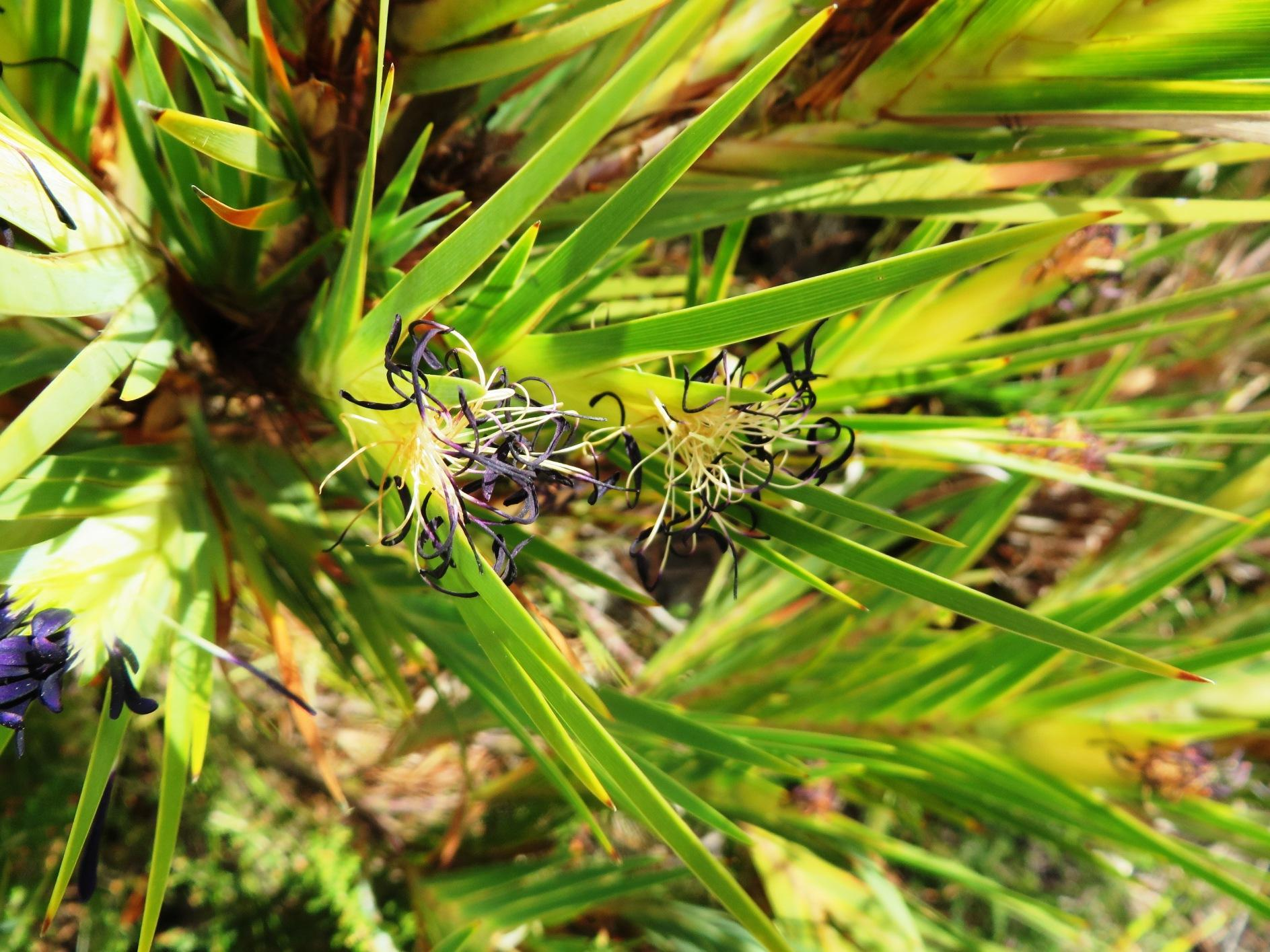

Scientific classification
- Kingdom: Plantae
- Clade: Tracheophytes
- Clade: Angiosperms
- Clade: Monocots
- Order: Asparagales
- Family: Iridaceae
- Genus: Klattia
- Species: K. partita

Binomial name
- Klattia partita Baker, (1877)

Synonyms
- Witsenia partita Ker Gawl. ex Klatt

= Klattia partita =

Species of flowering plant

Klattia partita is a plant that is endemic to the Western Cape and forms part of the fynbos. The plant occurs on the Cape Peninsula and from the Hottentots Holland Mountains to the Langeberg. Although the plant has a large range of 5905 km², it is considered rare. It is threatened by water abstraction in the Kogelberg and invasive plants in the Riviersonderend Mountains.
