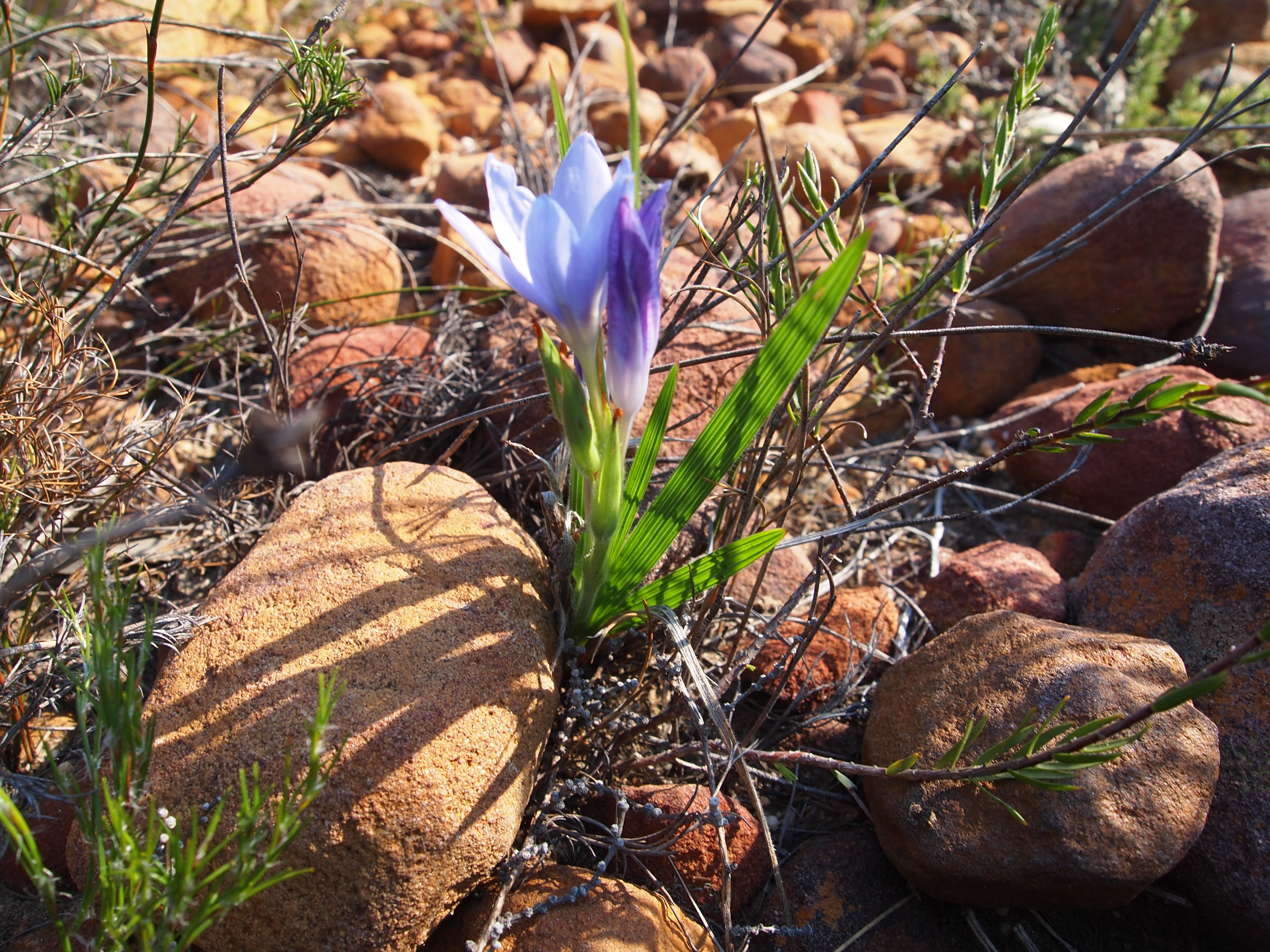

Scientific classification
- Kingdom: Plantae
- Clade: Tracheophytes
- Clade: Angiosperms
- Clade: Monocots
- Order: Asparagales
- Family: Iridaceae
- Genus: Babiana
- Species: B. villosula

Binomial name
- Babiana villosula (J.F.Gmel.) Ker Gawl. ex Steud., (1840)

Synonyms
- Babiana hiemalis L.Bolus; Babiana obtusifolia Ker Gawl.; Babiana orthosantha Baker; Babiana stricta var. obtusifolia (Ker Gawl.) Baker; Gladiolus plicatus (L.) L.; Gladiolus villosulus Roem. & Schult.; Ixia coerulescens Pers.; Ixia plicata L.; Ixia villosula J.F.Gmel.

= Babiana villosula =

Species of flowering plant

Babiana villosula is a perennial flowering plant and geophyte belonging to the genus Babiana. The species is endemic to the Western Cape; it occurs from Malmesbury to Gordon's Bay and is part of the fynbos and renosterveld. It has a range of less than 2000 km² and has already lost 80% of its habitat to development, invasive plants and the establishment of vineyards and orchards. Only seven of the eighteen original subpopulations remain and they are also threatened by invasive plants and development.
