= Louise Guthrie =

South African botanist (1879-1966)

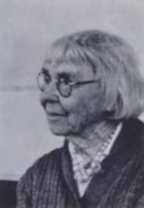
- Born: 10 October 1879; Cape Town, Cape Colony
- Died: 20 February 1966 (aged 86)
- Occupations: botanist, botanical artist

Louise Guthrie (10 October 1879 – 20 February 1966) was a South African botanist and botanical artist.

== Early life and education ==
Isobel Louise Sophie Guthrie was born in Cape Town, Cape Colony in 1879, the daughter of English-born botanist and mathematics professor Francis Guthrie and his wife, Isabella Grisbrook. She attended Rustenburg Girls High School.

== Career ==
Louise Guthrie was a botanical assistant at the Bolus Herbarium, beginning in 1918, until 1927. While there, she developed her skill as a botanical illustrator, best known for a series of 264 depictions of protea species found in South Africa, begun in 1925, with the last dated 1947. She donated the set to Bolus Herbarium in 1948.

The standard author abbreviation L.Guthrie is used to indicate this person as the author when citing a botanical name.

== Personal life and legacy ==
The guthriae plant name honors Louise Guthrie.

Her art is archived at the University of Cape Town. The Hermanus Botanical Society held an exhibit of 76 paintings by Guthrie in 2000, at the Fernkloof Nature Reserve. Some of her watercolors are on display at South Africa House in London.
