= Friedrich Wilhelm Klatt =

German botanist (1825–1897)

Friedrich Wilhelm Klatt (13 February 1825 Hamburg – 3 March 1897 Hamburg) was a German botanist who specialised in the study of African plants.

As a child he showed artistic talent, but for financial reasons, training and a career in art could not be followed. In 1854 he and his brother took over the running of a boys' school in Hamburg. He taught there until the outbreak of the Franco-Prussian War after which he taught natural science at several schools in Hamburg.

His first botanical collections were made in and about Hamburg as well as on the North Sea coastline. Through his collecting he became acquainted with Professor Lehmann of the Hamburg Botanical Gardens, who invited Klatt to organise and run his herbarium. Lehmann acted as mentor to Klatt, who soon concentrated his attention on the botanical families of Iridaceae and Pittosporaceae. His subsequent revision of the Iridaceae "Revisio Iridearum" led to his being awarded an honorary doctorate from the University of Rostock and an offer of a professorship which he declined.

Klatt contributed sections on Iridaceae to several publications — "Conspectus Florae Africae" by Durand & Schinz, "Flora Brasiliensis" by Martius, "Symbolæ ad Floram Brasiliæ centralis cognoscendam" by Eugenius Warming and "Baron Carl Claus von der Deckens reisen in Ost-Afrika in den jahren 1859 bis 1865" ("Karl Klaus von der Decken's travels in East Africa in 1859–65"). Klatt's greatest interest though, lay with the Compositae, and his publications on this family covered German East Africa, Madagascar, Australia, Brazil, Guatemala, Colombia and Costa Rica. He corresponded with and visited Kew, exchanged specimens with Asa Gray and managed to build up a considerable personal collection. In addition to his collection, he made detailed drawings of a large number of the specimens, especially type specimens, that were sent to him for identification. In 1877 John Gilbert Baker named the genus Klattia (family Iridaceae) in his honor.

After Klatt's death, his herbarium specimens were bought by and donated to the Gray Herbarium and the Botanical Institute of the University of Hamburg. This botanist is denoted by the author abbreviation Klatt when citing a botanical name.

== See also ==
- List of botanists by author abbreviation
- List of South African plant botanical authors

== Sources ==
- The Klatt Herbarium of Compositae at Harvard
