= Francis Guthrie =

South African mathematician and botanist (1831–1899)

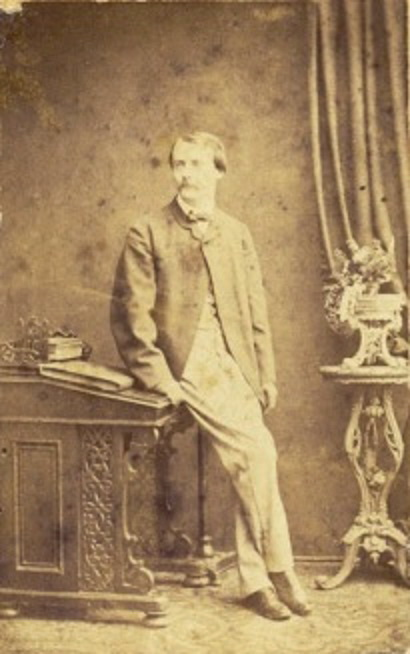
Francis Guthrie

Francis Guthrie (born 22 January 1831 in London; d. 19 October 1899 in Claremont, Cape Town) was a Cape Colony mathematician and botanist who first posed the Four Colour Problem in 1852. He studied mathematics under Augustus De Morgan, and botany under John Lindley at University College London. Guthrie obtained his B.A. in 1850, and LL.B. in 1852 with first class honours. While colouring a map of the counties of England, he noticed that at least four colours were required so that no two regions sharing a common border were the same colour. He postulated that four colours would be sufficient to colour any map. This became known as the Four Color Problem, and remained one of the most famous unsolved problems in graph theory for more than a century until it was eventually proven in 1976 using a lengthy computer-aided proof by Appel and Haken.

Guthrie arrived in South Africa on 10 April 1861 and was met and entertained by Dr Dale (later Sir Langham Dale), who was instrumental in the establishing of the University of the Cape of Good Hope in June 1873. Guthrie took up the post of mathematics master at the Graaff-Reinet College. While there he gave a course of acclaimed public lectures on botany in 1862 and thus started a lifelong friendship with local resident Harry Bolus. He advised Bolus to take up the study of botany to ease his grief at the loss of his six-year-old son. When Bolus left for Cape Town a few years later, he persuaded Guthrie to move there as well in 1875. For a while, he practised at the Bar and edited a newspaper before becoming the professor of mathematics at the South African College, which later became the University of Cape Town. He remained there from 1876 until he retired in 1898, staying on his farm at Raapenberg.

When Bolus undertook to do the family of Ericaceae for Flora Capensis, he enlisted Guthrie's aid and they collaborated until Guthrie's death. Before his death, Guthrie had made an extensive collection of the Cape Peninsula flora, which was eventually housed as the Guthrie Herbarium in the University of Cape Town Botany Department, and used for teaching and reference. Though Guthrie did not live to see the published work, he had the satisfaction of knowing that the greater part of the work on Erica had been completed. He is buried in the old cemetery attached to St. Thomas's Church in Rondebosch.

He was described as being warm-hearted, good-humoured, patient, and unpretentious. The scope of his interests was diverse and ranged from a lecture titled, "The Heat of the Sun in South Africa", in which he pointed out that it must be possible to transform solar energy into mechanical power, to aeronautics, where he was involved in the development of the first aircraft. Although dubbed the inventor of the first flying machine, no documentation of his work exists.

Some fynbos species from the Bredasdorp area were named after him: Gladiolus guthriei, Erica guthriei and Homoglossum guthriei, as well as the genus Guthriea Bolus. Cyrtanthus guthrieae was named after his daughter Louisa Guthrie, who was also a botanist. The new genus Guthriea was collected by Harry Bolus from Oudeberg in the Graaff-Reinet district, and also recorded from the Wittebergen in the Barkly East district and Mont-aux-Sources in Natal. To date no other species in this genus have been found.

Guthrie was an early member of the South African Philosophical Society (later the Royal Society of South Africa), an active member of the Meteorological Commission and an examiner of the Cape University.
