= Gwendoline Joyce Lewis =

South African botanist (1909–1967)

- Died: Cape Town, South Africa
- Education: University of Cape Town; Doctor of Philosophy (PhD)
- Known for: authority on the Iridaceae
- Scientific career
- Fields: Botany
- Author abbrev. (botany): G.J.Lewis

Gwendoline Joyce Lewis (1909–1967) was a South African botanist.

== Life ==
She graduated from the University of Cape Town, with a PhD. She was active in the description and classification of species of the family of the Iridaceae. She was an accomplished plant collector and added over 8000 plant specimens to herbaria. She was botanist at the Bolus Herbarium of the University of Cape Town for 2 years and then was appointed curator of the South African Museum Herbarium. In 1956 this herbarium and its staff moved to Kirstenbosch National Botanical Garden. Lewis was appointed a Research Officer with the National Botanical Gardens. She was a Fellow of the Royal Society of South Africa. She died in Cape Town on 11 April 1967.

The following plants were named after her: Geissorhiza lewisiae Forester; Muraltia lewisiae Levyns; Psilocaulon lewisiae Lbol and Thamnochortus lewisiae Pillans.

== Works ==
The standard author abbreviation G.J.Lewis is used to indicate this person as the author when citing a botanical name.

=== Books ===
- Gwendoline J. Lewis, A. Amalia Obermeyer, T. T. Barnard (1972). Gladiolus: A Revision of the South African Species. Purnell. 316 pp. colour illustrations by Gwendoline Joyce Lewis. (published posthumously)
- Gwendoline J. Lewis. 1954. Some Aspects of the Morphology, Phylogeny and Taxonomy of the South African Iridaceae. Volume 40, Splits 2 of Annals. Edition reimpresa of Ann. of the South African Museum, 99 pp.

== Sources ==
- Brummitt, RK; CE Powell. 1992. Authors of Plant Names. Royal Botanic Gardens, Kew. ISBN 1-84246-085-4
- The Journal of South African Botany: Supplementary volume. Trustees of the National Botanic Gardens of South Africa. 1 January 1972.
