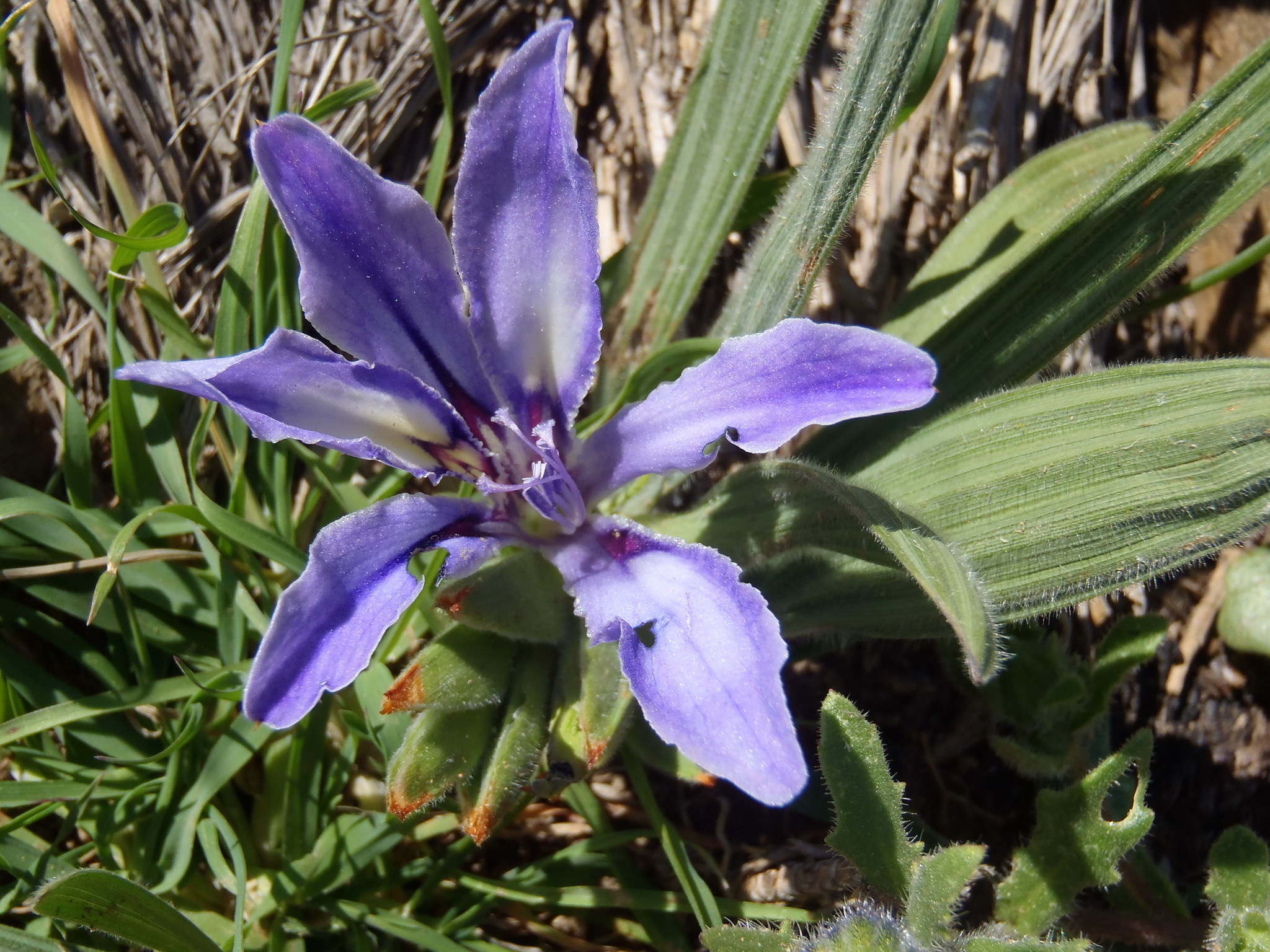

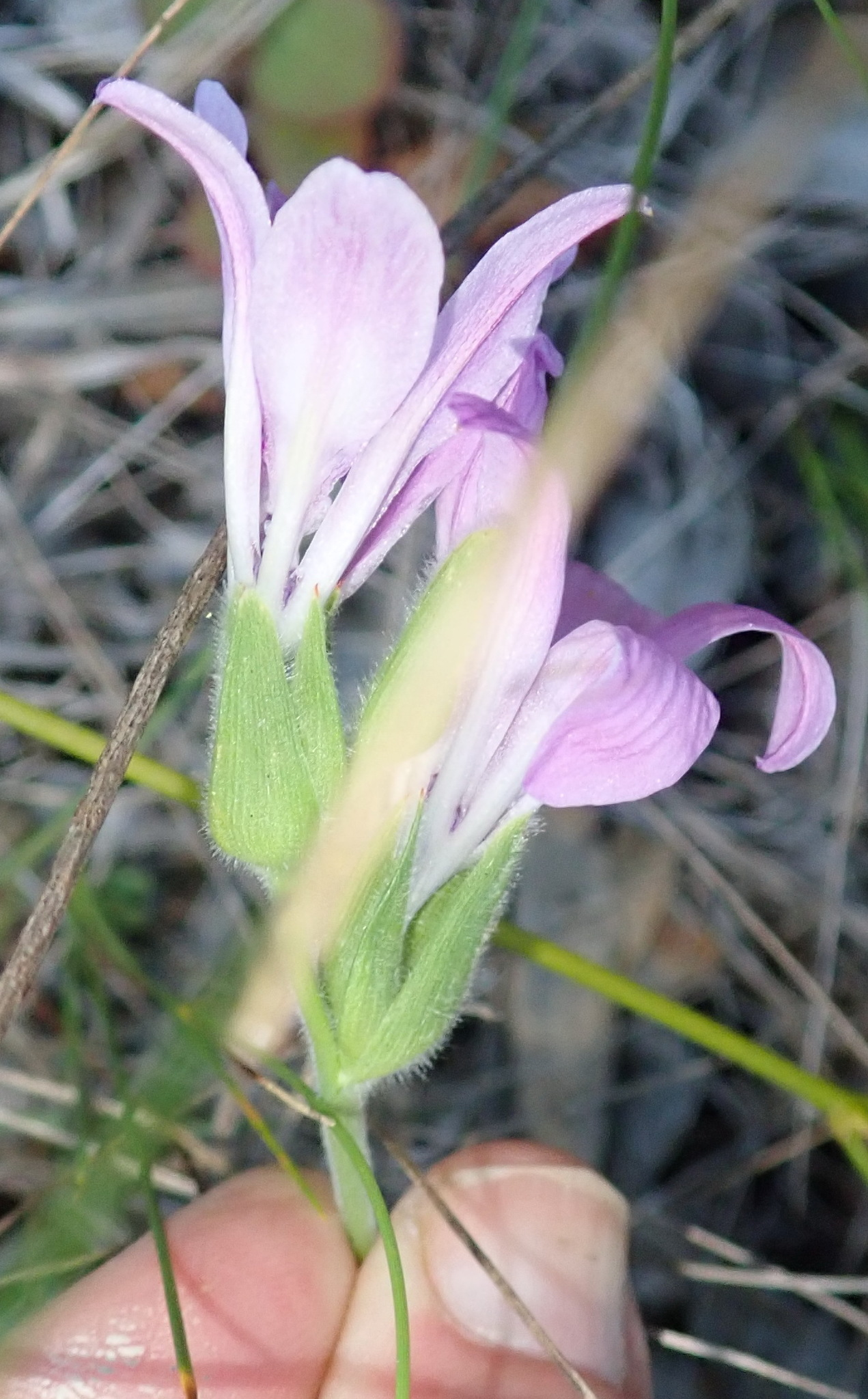

Scientific classification
- Kingdom: Plantae
- Clade: Tracheophytes
- Clade: Angiosperms
- Clade: Monocots
- Order: Asparagales
- Family: Iridaceae
- Genus: Babiana
- Species: B. ambigua

Binomial name
- Babiana ambigua (Roem. & Schult.) G.J.Lewis

Synonyms
- Gladiolus ambiguus Roem. & Schult.; Babiana obliqua E.Phillips

= Babiana ambigua =

Species of flowering plant

Babiana ambigua is a species of plant in the Iridaceae. It is endemic to the Western Cape province of South Africa. It is a geophyte, that appears from an underground corm every year and grows to a height of 5–8 cm (2.0–3.1 in) or occasionally up to 16 cm (6.3 in). Its leaves are pleated, hairy, lance-shaped, reaching higher than the inflorescence. The fragrant, mirror-symmetric, blue to mauve flowers, consist of six tepals merged into a tube at their base, but with free lobes at the top. The lower lateral tepals have whitish markings accentuated by a more intense blue line along their margin. Each flower is supported by two green bracts sometimes with a brownish tip, and the inner bract is divided entirely to its base. There are three anthers crowded to the dorsal side of the perianth and a style divided in three branches on top of a smooth ovary. Flowers can be found from late July at sea level to the end of September at high altitude. It is called common bobbejaantjie in English.

== Description ==
Babiana ambigua is a perennial plant of 5–8 cm (2.0–3.1 in), occasionally up to 16 cm (6.3 in) high that emerges from an underground globular corm at the start of its growing season. Unlike in most other Babiana species, the netted, fibrous tunic that surrounds the corm does not enclose the stem all the way to the surface where it does not form a fibrous collar. The sparsely hairy stem is completely underground or reaches only slightly above ground. It often produces small corms in the underground axils or rarely makes stolons. It has hairy, strongly pleated, line- to lance-shaped more or less upright leaf blades of 3–15 mm (0.12–0.59 in) wide that reach higher than the inflorescence. Each inflorescence contains two to four, blue to mauve or sometimes lilac flowers. The flowers are each enclosed at their base by two hairy, green bracts of 10–30 mm (0.39–1.18 in) or up to 40 mm (1.6 in) long, sometimes with a brown tip. The inner bract is as long as the outer or slightly shorter and is split entirely to its base. Each flower has a mirror-symmetrical perianth that consists of a 10–19 mm (0.39–0.75 in) long, funnel-shaped or oblique tube from the base, that splits in six unequal tepals near the top. The flowers smell spicy or sweet. The dorsal tepal is larger, 28–45 mm (1.1–1.8 in) long, 10–12 mm (0.39–0.47 in) wide and is joint 2–4 mm (0.079–0.157 in) less higher up than the remaining tepals among themselves. The lower tepals are 20–30 mm (0.79–1.18 in) long. The lower lateral tepals have white to cream-coloured blotches, that are offset by intense purple. The three stamens are crowded near the dorsal tepal, have curved filaments of 13–16 mm (0.51–0.63 in) long, topped by line-shaped anthers of 6–8 mm (0.24–0.31 in) long. The ovary is smooth or has some hairs on the higher end of the ribs, and is topped by a style that divides at the same level as the tips of the anthers into three branches, and each branches becomes wider it its upper third.

=== Differences with similar species ===
Babiana petiolata is most closely related to B. ambigua and shares the absence of the fibrous collar where the stem emerges, entirely split inner bracts and smooth ovaries, but the smooth, papillate or scabrid leaf blades that are inclined towards the ground, sit on a part of the leaf stems that does not form a sheath around the base of the higher leaves and so lacks wing-like extensions, has smaller flowers with a tube of only 11 mm long that emit an iris-scent and flowers from late June to July. B. patula is easily mistaken for B. ambigua but it has a fibrous collar and the lower lateral tepals are yellow, not blotched white or cream-coloured. B. cedarbergensis superficially resembles B. ambigua but has a fibrous collar, rigid leaves, the inner bract split only in the upper third, and a hairy ovary. B. montana looks a lot like B. ambigua but has a hard fibrous collar, floral bracts of only up to 2 cm long and style branches that expand only a little at their tips. b. nana flowers later than B. ambigua in coastal areas, from late August to the end of September, has somewhat larger, more fragrant and deeper coloured flowers and the inner bract is forked only at the tip. B. grandiflora has considerably larger flowers and also has its inner bract only notched at the tip. B. arenicola has 3-6 mm wide stiff leaves, a straight perianth tube of about 3 cm long, a style that branches near the base of the anthers and a minutely to prominently hairy ovary. B. scabrifolia has a fibrous collar and undulating tepal margins.

== Taxonomy ==
This species was first described by Johann Jacob Roemer and Josef August Schultes in 1817 as Gladiolus ambiguus, based on material stored by Jean-Baptiste Lamarck at the herbarium of the Muséum National d'Histoire Naturelle. In 1929, Edwin Percy Phillips described a plant collected near Lambert's Bay and named it Babiana obliqua. African botanist Gwendoline Joyce Lewis published in 1959 an extensive revision of the genus Babiana. She reassigned Roemer and Schultes' species to Babiana, creating the new combination B. ambigua, and regarded B. obliqua as a synonym.

== Distribution, ecology and conservation ==
Babiana ambigua can be found in the mountains and the coastal belt of the Western Cape province of South Africa between Riversdale in the southeast and the Gifberg in the northwest. It grows in fynbos and renosterveld on different kinds of soils, including the deep coastal sands of the strandveld habitat, mountain slopes and flats with a rocky sandstone underground, and renosterveld vegetation on granite-derived soils. Urban development in low-lying coastal areas and alien invasives threatened some subpopulations. But this species is still too common and too widespread, and many subpopulations are present in safe mountain habitat, therefore it is considered a least-concern species.
