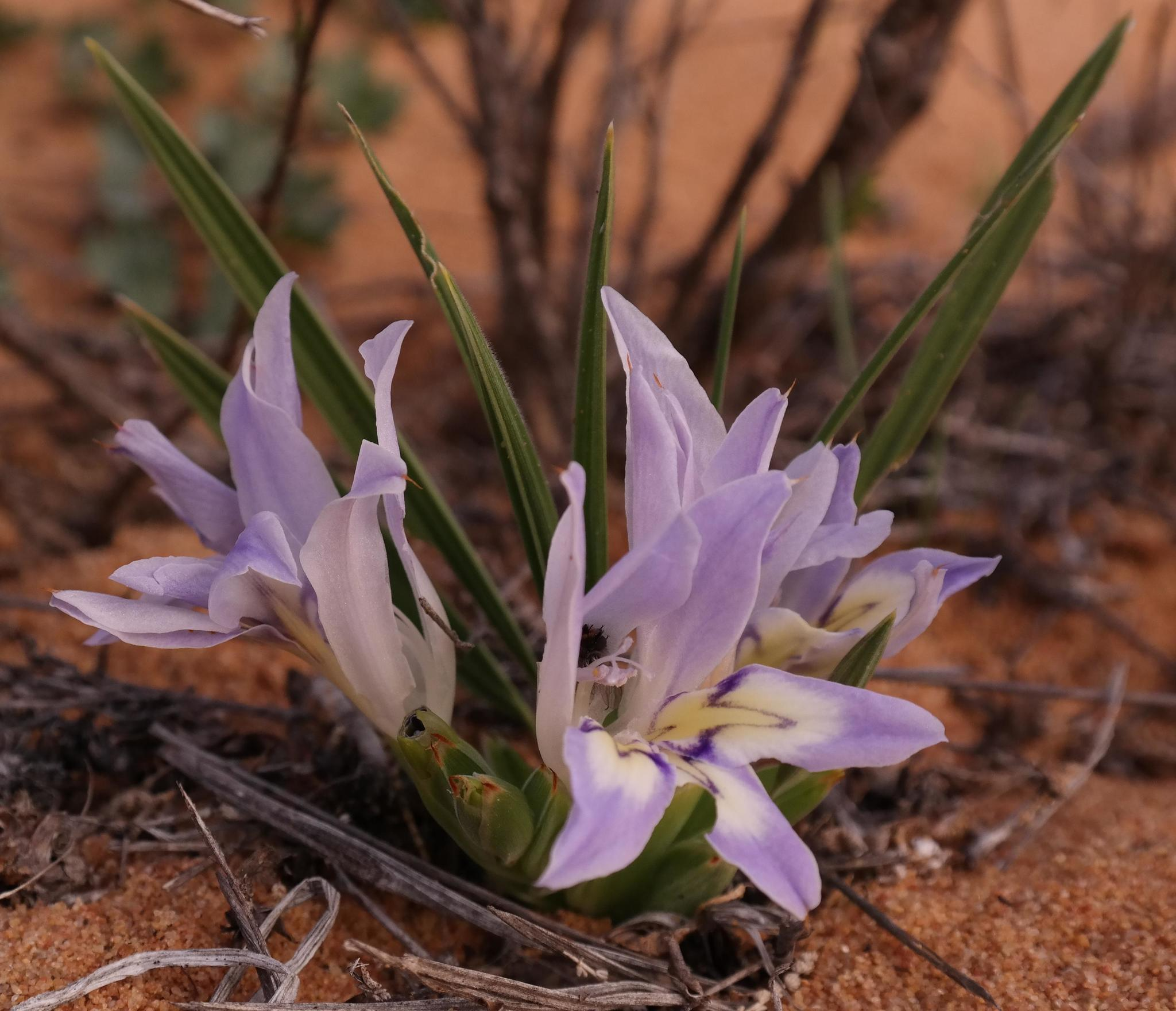

Scientific classification
- Kingdom: Plantae
- Clade: Embryophytes
- Clade: Tracheophytes
- Clade: Spermatophytes
- Clade: Angiosperms
- Clade: Monocots
- Order: Asparagales
- Family: Iridaceae
- Genus: Babiana
- Species: B. grandiflora

Binomial name
- Babiana grandiflora Goldblatt & J.C. Manning

= Babiana grandiflora =

Species of flowering plant

Babiana grandiflora is a species of flowering plant in the family Iridaceae. It is a perennial plant of 8–14 cm (3.1–5.5 in) high that emerges at the start of every growing season from an underground corm. It has pleated sideways flattened leaves. It can be distinguished from other species of bobbejaantjie mainly by its very large, mirror-symmetric deep to pale bluish flowers near the ground. It also has very short filaments crowded near the dorsal tepal, resulting in the anthers being largely hidden within the floral cup of the funnel-shaped perianth. The perianth is entirely filled by the style in the bottom half of the tube. The flowers have a strong acrid-spicy, violet-like scent. Babiana grandiflora is native to the coastal plains of Namaqualand, South Africa. The continued survival of this species is considered being of least-concern.

== Description ==
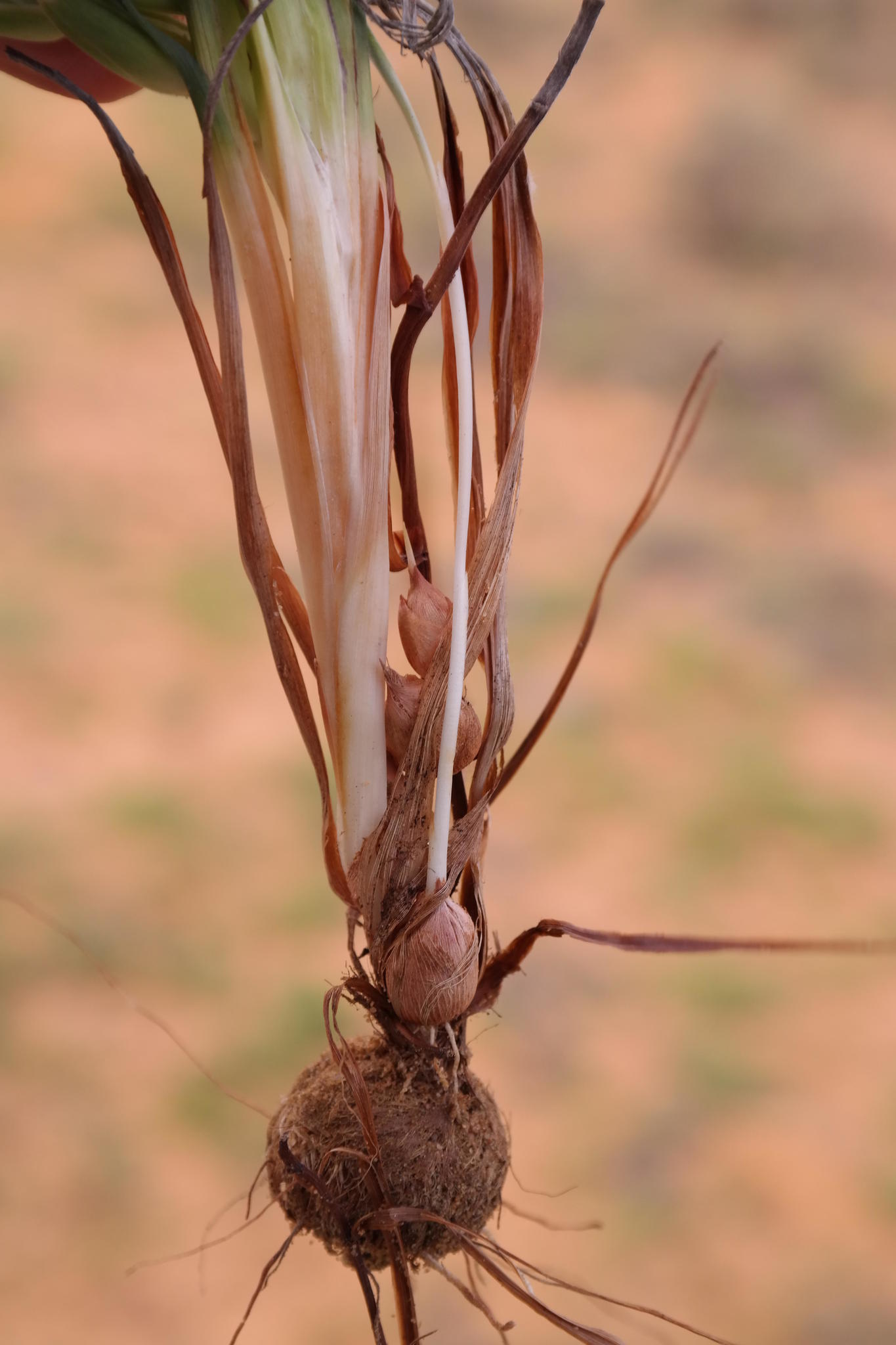
Underground parts of Babiana grandiflora showing corms and roots, and lack of a fibrous collar

Babiana grandiflora is a geophyte of 8–14 cm (3.1–5.5 in) high, including its leaves that are set in a fan. Its densely hairy stem may be completely underground or reaching shortly above ground level. It is simple or may occasionally have 1 or 2 side branches. The mostly 6–11 mm (0.24–0.43 in) occasionally up to 15 mm wide, lance- to sword-shaped leaves are covered in short, vervety hairs and slightly twisted. The two velvety bracts that subtend each of the flowers are 24–35 mm (0.94–1.38 in) long are green, with the tips drying brown when flowering. The inner bracht is often slightly longer than the outer, and forked at its tip. Each stem carries 2-5 deep to pale blue mirror-symmetrical flowers with markings, set in a decumbent spike. The flowers have a strong spicy but acrid scent with undertones of violet. The tube of the perianth is funnel-shaped, 18–20 mm (0.71–0.79 in) long. Up to about 12 mm from the base, the tube is a thickened and the lower half is blocked by the style. The tepals are lance-shaped. The dorsal tepal is 45–55 mm (1.8–2.2 in) long and about 13 mm (0.51 in) wide with undulating margins. The upper lateral tepals are joined to lower for about 8 mm (0.31 in). The lower lateral tepals are merged for about 4 mm (0.16 in) and are about 35 mm (1.4 in) long. The 3 stamens are hairy at base, crowded near the dorsal tepal, having arched filaments of about 10 mm (0.39 in) long, reach slightly beyond the upper part of tube. The filaments are topped by 8–9 mm (0.31–0.35 in) long, pale bluish anthers that produce off-white pollen. The ovary is hairless and topped with a style that arches over the stamens. This species flowers between late July and early September.

=== Differences with other Babiana species ===
Babiana grandiflora together with B. ambigua, B. petiolata and B. nana consistently have a poorly developed collar of fibres around the underground part of the stem. Babiana grandiflora is much alike B. nana but differs in having narrow, erect leaves covered with short, velvety hairs and mostly unbranched spikes at ground level bearing 2-5 flowers. It may also be confused with the commonly occurring species B. ambigua that grows in deep sandy soils on the coast and inland in the Western Cape, but that species has inner bracts that are split al the way to the base and has smaller flowers in which the dorsal tepal only measures 28–40 mm (1.1–1.6 in) and the filaments are longer at 13–16 mm, not dorsal tepals of 45–55 mm long and filaments of about 10 mm as in B. grandiflora.

== Taxonomy ==
As far as we know, specimens of this species were for the first time collected for scientific research in 1962 by the Swedish botanist, Bertil Nordenstam, 3.5 km east of Kotzesrus along the road to Garies on the coastal plains of Namaqualand. It was named Babiana grandiflora by Peter Goldblatt and John Charles Manning in 2007. It is not identical to Babiana stricta var. grandiflora, that was described by Gwendoline Joyce Lewis in 1959, but is currently named B. longiflora.

== Distribution and ecology ==
Babiana grandiflora occurs in the Northern and Western Cape provinces of South Africa on the coastal plains of Namaqualand between Koekenaap, near to the mouth of the Olifants River, and Soutfontein just south of Wallekraal. It can be found in fynbos and succulent karoo, where it grows on sandy flats, usually in deep sand.

== Conservation ==
Babiana grandiflora can be found in a part of South Africa that has been poorly explored. It is known from 12 locations, but it is likely that more subpopulations will be discovered in this large area that consists mostly of pristine habitat. A possible future threat is the expansion of open pit mining. It is listed as a least concern species since it is currently not threatened and widely distributed.
