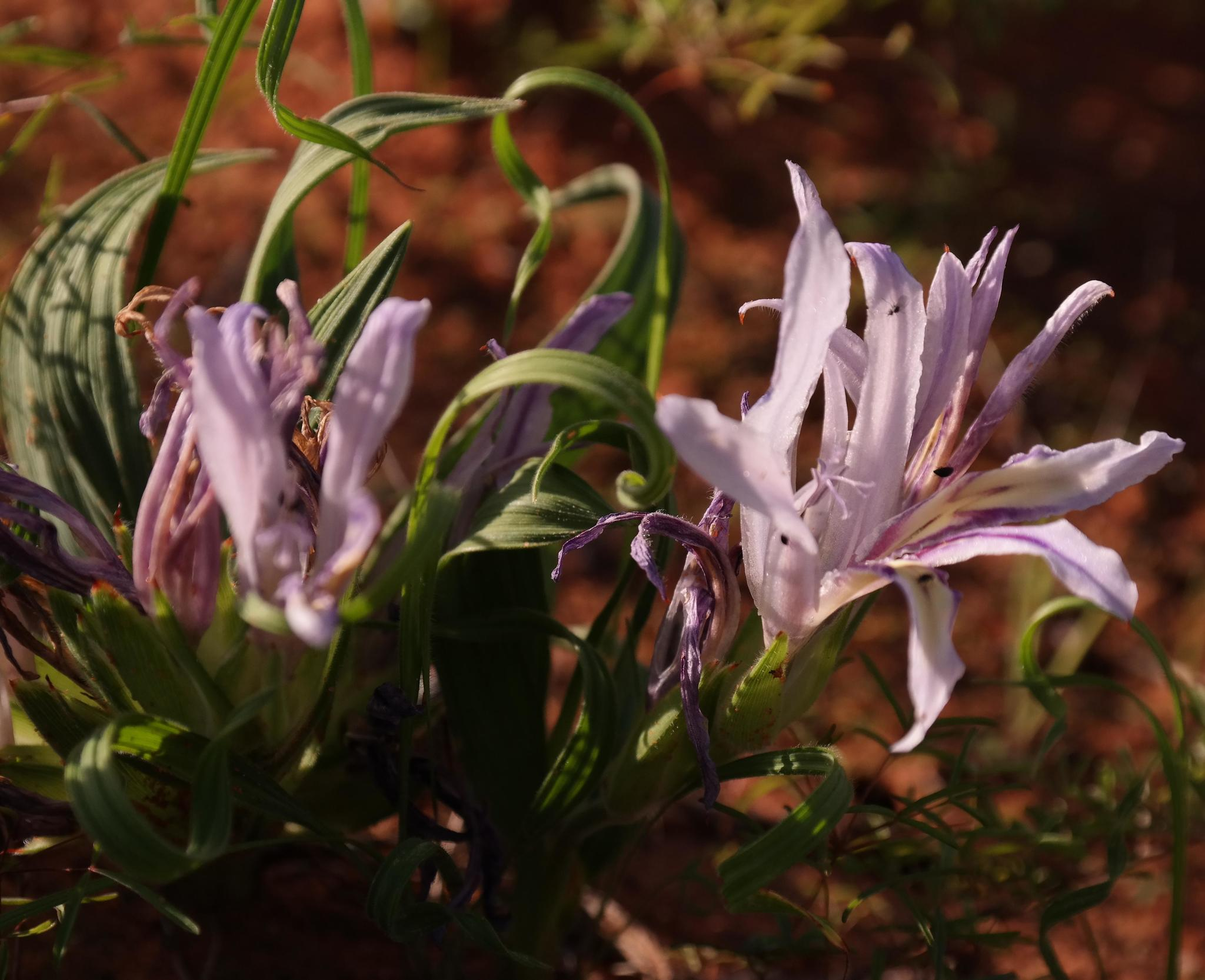

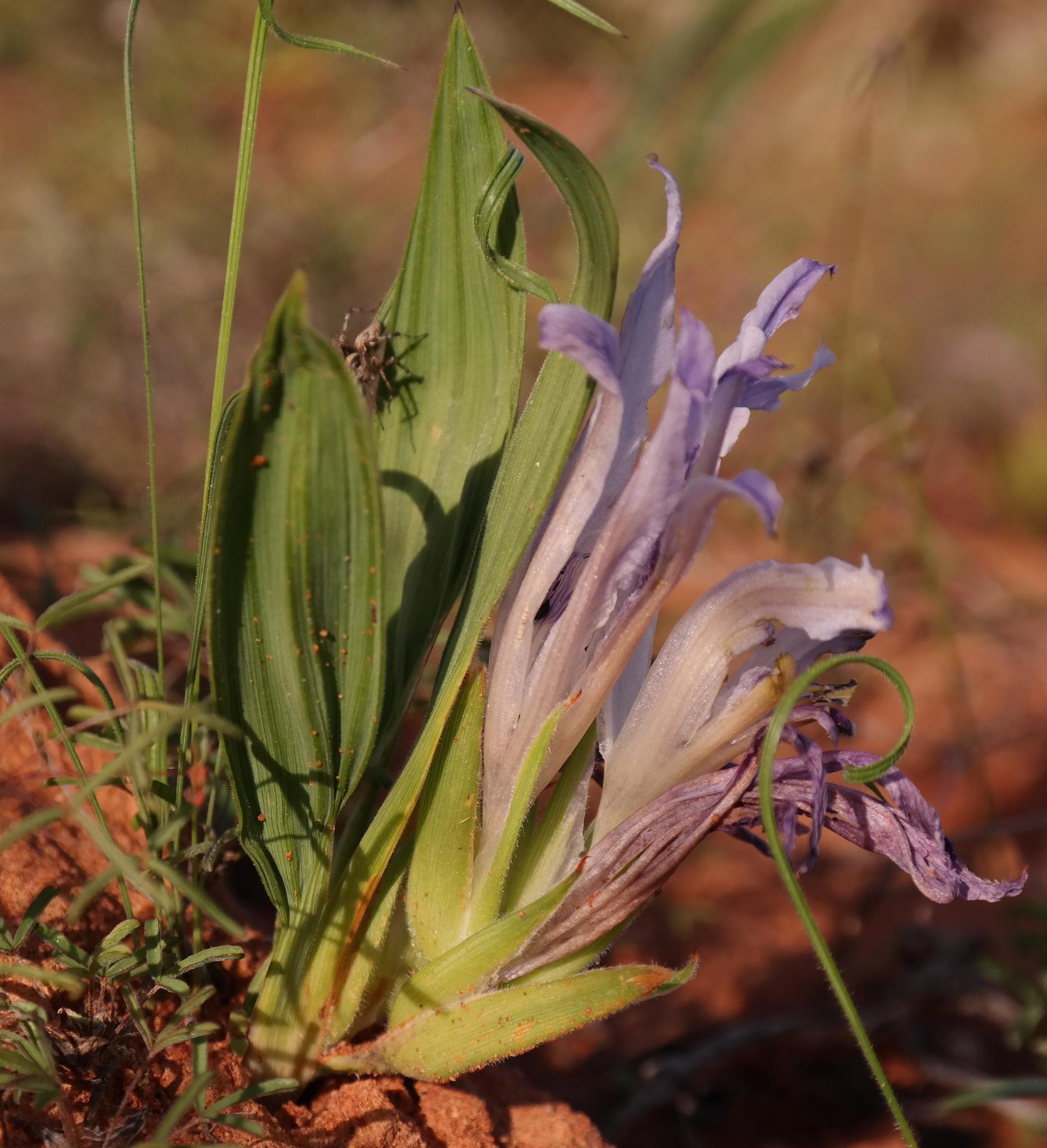

Conservation status
- Least Concern (IUCN 3.1)

Scientific classification
- Kingdom: Plantae
- Clade: Tracheophytes
- Clade: Angiosperms
- Clade: Monocots
- Order: Asparagales
- Family: Iridaceae
- Genus: Babiana
- Species: B. scabrifolia

Binomial name
- Babiana scabrifolia Brehm ex Klatt

Synonyms
- B. adpressa G.J.Lewis; B. occidentalis Baker; B. subglabra G.J.Lewis; B. scabrifolia var. acuminata G.J.Lewis; B. scabrifolia var. declinata G.J.Lewis

= Babiana scabrifolia =

Species of flowering plant

Babiana scabrifolia is a perennial plant of 5–15 cm (2.0–5.9 in) high that annually forms leaves and flowers from an underground corm and is assigned to the Iris family. It produces relatively large, pale lilac or blue flowers slightly above the soil, and soft, lightly pleated leaves that reach beyond the flowers. These leaves are lance-shaped to oblong in adults, but line-shaped and twisted in non-flowering specimens. Flowering occurs from June to August. The species can be found in the Western Cape province of South Africa.

== Description ==
Babiana scabrifolia is a geophyte with an underground corm from which annually the leaves and stems appear above ground, forming a plant of 5–15 cm (2.0–5.9 in) high including the leaves. The stem is mostly underground, simple or branched and enveloped by a thick fibrous collar. The above ground parts are hairy. The leaf blades have a soft texture and are lightly pleated, lance-shaped to oblong, 6–10 cm (2.4–3.9 in) long and 6–20 mm (0.24–0.79 in) wide, reaching beyond the flowers. The blade sits at an angle atop a sheath that envelops the sheaths of higher leaves.

The sweetly, mostly daffodil-like scented flowers sit with four to eight together in an inclined or horizontal spike, each subtended by two entire green, sparely hairy bracts of 20–32 mm (0.79–1.26 in). The inner bract is slightly shorter than the outer and split entirely or almost to the base and has wide transparent margins. The base colour of the mirror-symmetrical perianth is pale lilac or pale blue, merged to a narrowly funnel-shaped tube of 12–18 mm (0.47–0.71 in) long that splits into six unequal perianth lobes, the dorsal 30–45 mm (1.2–1.8 in) long and 7–10 mm (0.28–0.39 in) wide. The other five are 20–30 mm (0.79–1.18 in) long and merged to each other for about 4 mm (0.16 in) forming a distinctive lower lip. The lower lateral lobes are adorned with a cream-coloured or white splash in its basal half accentuated by dark violet to blue and have undulating or crisped margins. Three stamens are crowded at the dorsal side of the flower and consist of a 13–18 mm (0.51–0.71 in) long, arched filament and carrying a anther of 6–8 mm (0.24–0.31 in) long that contains white pollen. Below the perianth tube sits an ovary that is thinly hairy in the upper half, on the ribs or rarely hairless. From the ovary the style emerges, which splits into three branches of 4–5 mm (0.16–0.20 in) long between the middle and the tip of the anthers. These style branches widen considerably towards their tips. This species flowers between June and August.

=== Differences with similar species ===
Babiana mucronata occurs in the same area as B. scabrifolia but it has upright stems that reach into the air and are enveloped by a fibrous collar below ground, has floral bracts with dry, rusty brown tips, and much smaller blue-violet flowers with an acrid, unpleasant smell or sometimes scentless. Babiana ambigua lacks a collar of fibres surrounding the underground parts of the stem, and the margins of the lower lateral tepal lobes are plane. B. scabrifolia is equipped with a fibrous collar enveloping the stem, has lower lateral tepal lobes with undulating margins, and a sweet, mostly daffodil-like smell.

== Taxonomy and naming ==
This species was first described by Friedrich Wilhelm Klatt in 1882, based on a collection made in 1830 by Johann Franz Drège from the Langevallei near Clanwilliam, using a name that had been suggested by Joachim Brehm, who had failed to make a valid description. South African botanist Gwendoline Joyce Lewis published in 1959 an extensive revision of the genus Babiana. Therein she distinguished several forms that apparently reflected variations that reflect differences in soil and microclimate, in particular B. adpressa, B. subglabra, B. scabrifolia var. acuminata and B. scabrifolia var. declinata. Peter Goldblatt and John Charles Manning revised the genus again in 2007, and they regarded all of these names as synonymous.

The species name scabrifolia is derived from the Latin words scabro that means 'to scratch' and folius that means 'leaf', which together indicate the plant would have rough leaves.

== Distribution, ecology and conservation ==
Babiana scabrifolia can be found in the north-eastern Cederberg to the Olifants River Valley around Citrusdal and the Nardous Mountains in the Western Cape province of South Africa. Here its grows on stony and sandy lower mountain slopes in dry fynbos and karroo scrubland. It is pollinated by bees, including honey bees. The species readily reproduces by making small corms, which produce line-shaped, twisted leafs that contrast with the soft-textured and wide leaves of the adult corms. It is a locally common species, in particular in the northern parts of its range from Pakhuis Pass to the Nardous Mountains, that is known from over twenty locations. Even though some subpopulations are lost to expanding agriculture, most are safe from habitat loss, partially being in protected areas, and therefore it is unlikely that this species will be driven to extinction in the near future.
