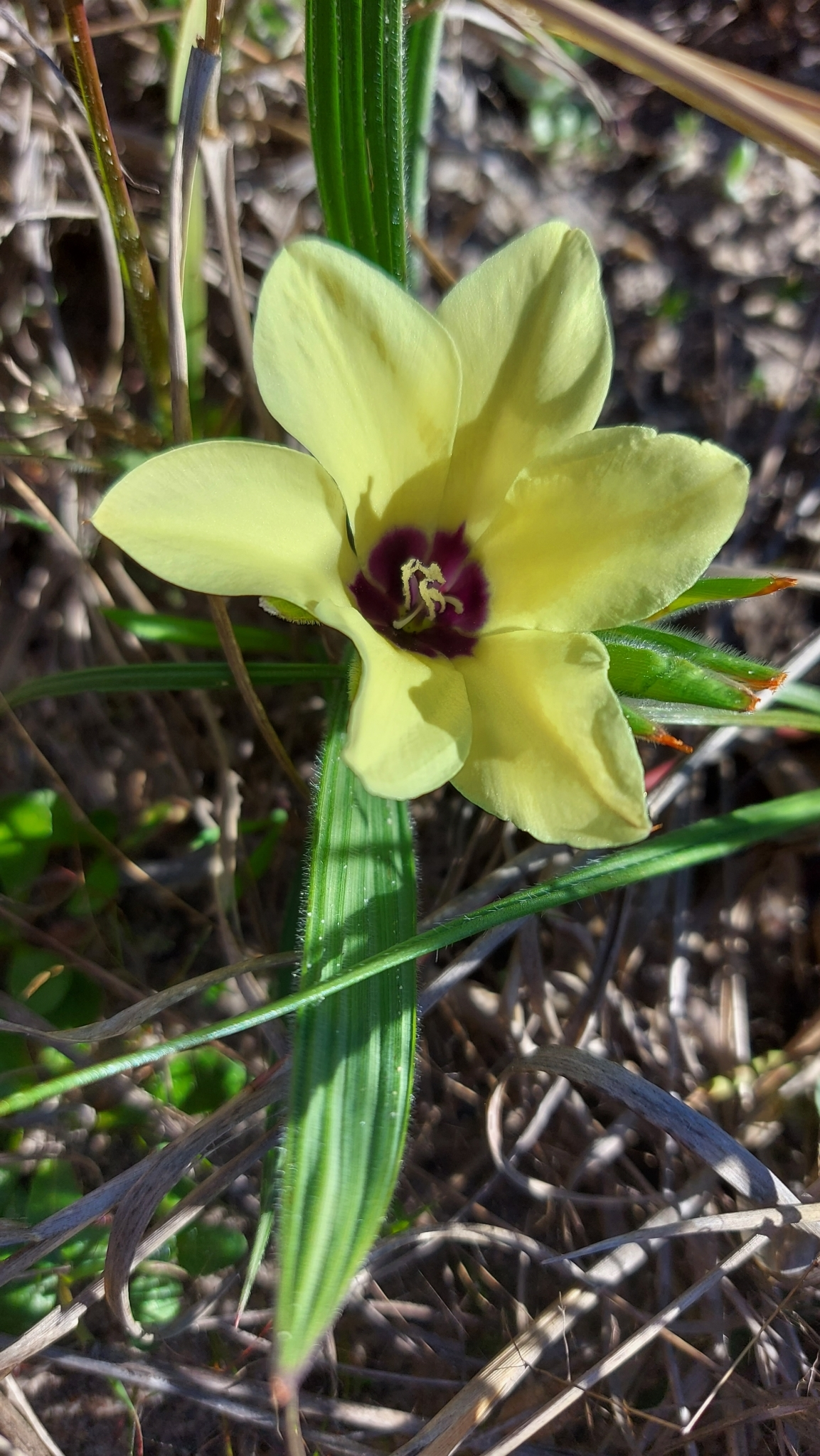

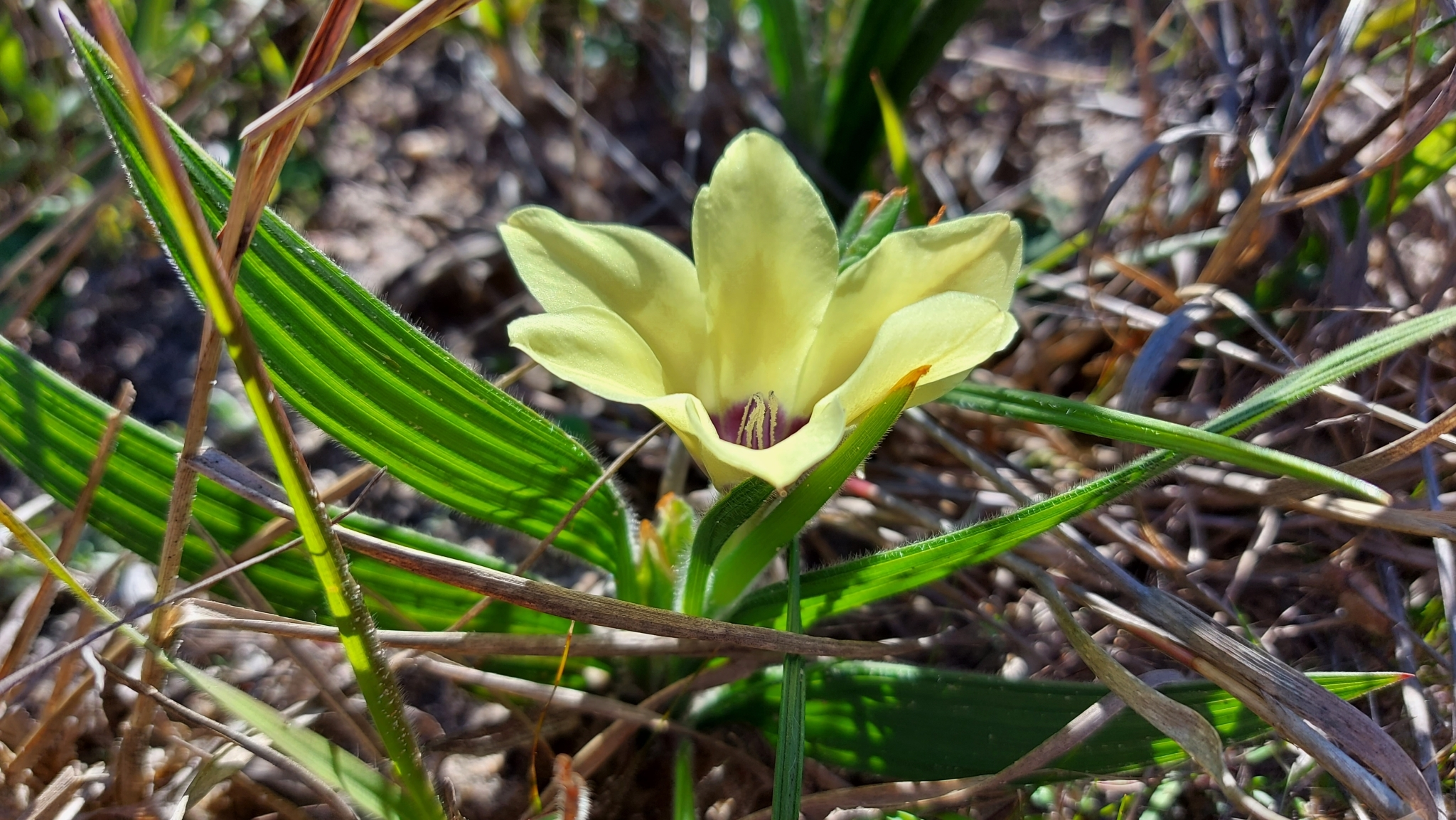

Scientific classification
- Kingdom: Plantae
- Clade: Tracheophytes
- Clade: Angiosperms
- Clade: Monocots
- Order: Asparagales
- Family: Iridaceae
- Genus: Babiana
- Species: B. pygmaea

Binomial name
- Babiana pygmaea (Burm.f.) Baker

Synonyms
- Ixia pigmaea Burm.f.; B. macrantha Peter MacOwan

= Babiana pygmaea =

Cream Bobbejaantjie

Species of flowering plant

Babiana pygmaea, known in English as the cream bobbejaantjie, is a perennial plant of about 10 cm (3.9 in) high that annually forms leaves and flowers from an underground corm that is assigned to the iris family. It has bowl-shaped, pale yellow flowers with six perianth lobes, purplish in its heart, emerging from a cylindrical tube, and lance-shaped, pleated and heary leafblades that are almost at a right angle with the sheaths. The species can be found in the Western Cape province of South Africa. It is called geelbobbejaantjie in Afrikaans.

== Description ==
Geelbobbejaantjie is a geophyte with an egg-shaped, underground corm from which annually the leaves and stems appear above ground, forming a plant of about 10 cm (3.9 in) high including the leaves. The stem is upright, seldomly branched and covered in velvety hairs. The leaf blades are pleated, softly hairy and lance-shaped 6–20 mm (0.24–0.79 in) wide. The blade sits at an almost right angle atop a sheath that envelops the sheaths of higher leaves.

The unscented flowers sit with two to five together in an upright spike and are each subtended by two bracts of 30–36 mm (1.2–1.4 in). The inner bract is slightly shorter than the outer and forked or split to approximately half length. The base colour of the star-symmetrical perianth is pale yellow with a dull purple to dark brown centre. The six tepals are merged into a cylindrical tube of 15–25 mm (0.59–0.98 in) long, which is slightly wider at the throat and splits into six almost equal, inverted egg-shaped perianth lobes of 23–33 mm (0.91–1.30 in) long and 14–20 mm (0.55–0.79 in) wide that are spreading when the flower is fully open. The three stamens are arranged symmetrically in the centre of the flower enclosing the style and consist of a 3–6 mm (0.12–0.24 in) long upright filament and carrying a anther of 8–10 mm (0.31–0.39 in) long. Below the perianth tube sits an ovary that is hairy in the upper half or on the ribs. From the ovary the style emerges, which splits into three branches at the same height as the middle of the anthers. This species flowers between August and early September.

== Taxonomy and naming ==
Geelbobbejaantjie was first described by Nicolaas Laurens Burman in 1768 and he named it Ixia pigmaea. John Gilbert Baker in 1877 created the new combination Babiana pygmaea, mistaking it for another species, B. nana, described earlier by Kurt Polycarp Joachim Sprengel, and he regarded Sprengel's species as a synonym of B. pygmaea. Even though the species name pygmaea was wrongly regarded as a synonym, it still is the valid name as botanical nomenclature dictates that the earliest published name has priority. Peter Goldblatt and John Charles Manning revised the genus again in 2007, and they regarded all of these names as synonymous.

The specific name pygmaea is a Latin word that means 'dwarf'. The species is however not the smallest in the genus, and it has some of the largest flowers. It is however much lower than other Ixia species, the genus that Burman the Younger originally assigned it to.

== Distribution, ecology and conservation ==
Geelbobbejaantjie can be found around Darling in the Western Cape province of South Africa. With its scentless, bowl-shaped pale yellow flowers and dark purplish heart, the species is typically adapted to pollination by monkey beetles. Small subpopulations remain on four to six locations after most renosterveld in the Swartland area has been reclaimed for agriculture. Even there, the species remains under pressure due to competition by unchecked invasive plants such as Acacia, and local heavy grazing. The total population in 2015 was estimated at less than 1500 specimen and is expected to further decline. Therefore, geelbobbejaantjie is considered to be critically endangered.
