= Erik Acharius =

Swedish botanist (1757-1819)

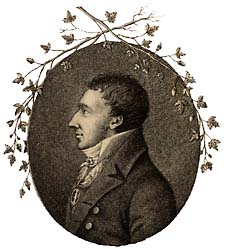
- Born: 10 October 1757; Gävle, Sweden
- Died: 14 August 1819 (aged 61); Vadstena, Sweden
- Education: Uppsala University
- Known for: Pioneering lichenology
- Awards: Member of the Linnean Society
- Scientific career
- Fields: Botany Lichenology
- Academic advisors: Carl Linnaeus
- Author abbrev. (botany): Ach.

Erik Acharius (10 October 1757 – 14 August 1819) was a Swedish botanist who pioneered the taxonomy of lichens and is known as the "father of lichenology". Acharius was famously the last pupil of Carl Linnaeus.

== Life ==
Acharius was born in 1757 to Johan Eric Acharius and Catharina Margaretha Hagtorn in Gävle. He received a private education until he was admitted to Gävle Gymnasium in 1770. Later he matriculated at Uppsala University in 1773 where he studied natural history and medicine under Linnaeus and was the last student to defend a dissertation before him. Acharius's dissertation titled, Planta Aphyteia, was on a vascular plant species (Hydnora) collected in Southern Africa by Carl Peter Thunberg, which Linnaeus incorrectly classified as fungi. Thus he is known as "Carl Linnaeus last disciple" or the last pupil of Linnaeus. After graduating from Uppsala in 1776, he later worked for the Royal Academy of Sciences in Stockholm and completed his medical studies at Lund University in 1782. He was appointed town medical officer in Vadstena in 1785, district medical officer in Östergötland County in 1789, director of the new Vadstena Hospital (which he had initiated) in 1795, and titular professor in 1803. As a cartoonist, Acharius Johan illustrated Peter Westring's work Svenska lafvarne color history (1805) and Carl Peter Thunberg's Flora Capensis.

In 1787 Erik Acharius married Helena Dorotea Scholander (1762–1804), the daughter of a trader, in Landskrona. After Helena's death Acharius married Margareta Maria Hoffberg on 31 December 1804. She was the daughter of Gottfrid Hoffberg who was in charge of production of saltpeter for munitions in Skänninge. In total Erik Acharius had four children, Lars Gustaf Acharius, Jean Torkel Acharius, Catharina Theodora Ohrling (née Acharius) and Charlotta Wilhelmina Acharius.

Acharius spent the remainder of his life in Vadstena, where he died of a stroke while in his household garden examining a Spanish collection of lichens on 14 August 1819, at the age of 61.

== Work in lichenology ==
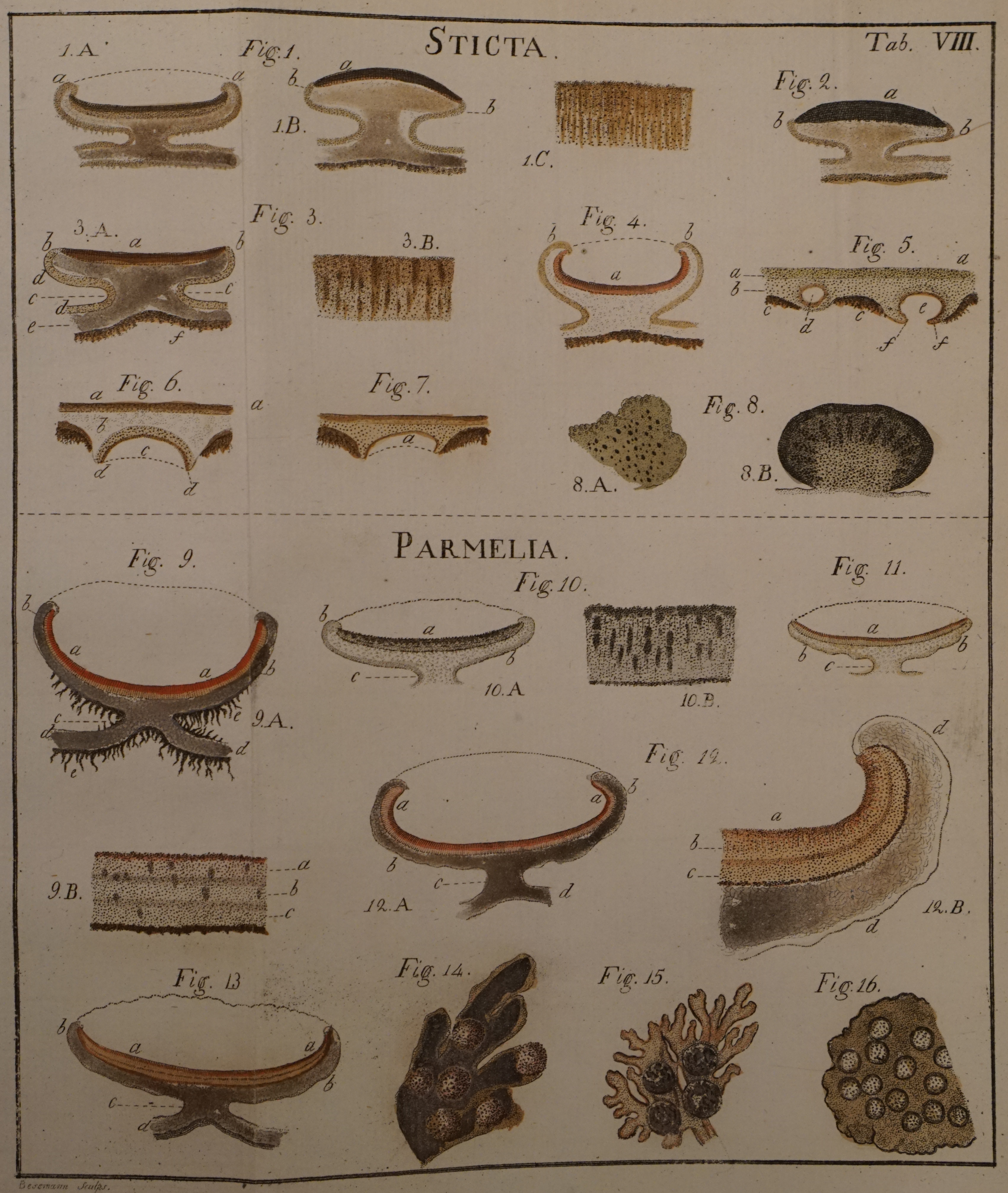
Illustration from Lichenographia universalis

Acharius belonged to the younger generations of Swedish botanists who continued what Linnaeus had left undone; classifying all living organisms. Acharius began the taxonomic classification of Lichenes and during his lifetime he classified over 3300 species of lichen separated into 40 different genera. At the time of Linnaeus's death all lichens were grouped into a single genus, thus Acharius was the first to expand lichen classification into the multi-divisional group of organisms it is known to be today. His first publication was Lichenographiae Suecia prodromus, published in 1798, which detailed all known lichen species found in Sweden. This was the first published work to detail lichens using binomial nomenclature and expand their classification beyond a single genus. While composing Lichenographiae Suecia prodromus, Acharius began communicating with Olof Swartz, another Linnaean disciple, and from 1780 to 1815 they sent nearly 350 letters to each other. Swartz is believed by many historians to have heavily influenced the development of Acharius's classification system. Additionally, Swartz introduced Acharius to many other Swedish naturalists as also several important international figures such as James Edward Smith, the head of the Linnean Society. This exposure aided Acharius in spreading his new findings on lichens to an international audience. After publishing his first work, he sent a copy to James Edward Smith who, in response, inducted Acharius as a foreign member of the Linnean Society. Subsequently, Acharius published Methodus qua omnes detectos lichenes (1803), Lichenographia universalis (1810), and Synopsis methodica lichenum (1814) each of which he sent to the Society in London, accompanied by hundreds of the specimens described in each book. Over his lifetime Acharius collected over 5500 specimens of lichen most of which are housed today in the Botanical Museum of the Finnish Museum of Natural History.

In his influential works, Acharius introduced many lichen-related terminology that remain in common use today. Starting with designating the pits on the underside of Sticta lichens as cyphellae in 1794, he added the terms apothecium, cephalodium, podetium, proper margin, soredium, and thallus in 1803; thalline margin in 1810; and mazaedium in 1817.

== Legacy ==
Acharius's international reputation influence many new lichenologist from all over Europe. In 1804 Friedrich Weber (1781–1823) and Daniel Matthias Heinrich Mohr (1780–1808), two German naturalists, published Naturhistorische Reise durch einen Theil Schwedens which heavily featured his work on lichens and also included four illustrations by Acharius. Furthermore, William Borrer who pioneered lichenology in Britain (and is often called the father of British lichenology) was heavily influence by Acharius's specimens and publications received by the Linnean society in London. These collections and books were studied by Borrer in 1809 and served as the basis for his own work. Additionally Thomas Gage published A Monograph of the Genus Cenomyce: Consisting of Coloured Drawings of Each Species and Variety, As Described in the Lichenographia Universalis of Acharius in 1815, which contained illustrations of every species and variation of the genus Cenomyce as described in Lichenographia universalis. To this day several of Acharius's original classification schema are still used in lichen taxonomy. The International Association for Lichenology has named its medal for lifetime achievement in lichenology the Acharius Medal after him. and also in 1992 installed a commemorative plaque on the house in Vadstena where he lived for many years.

== Publications and honors ==
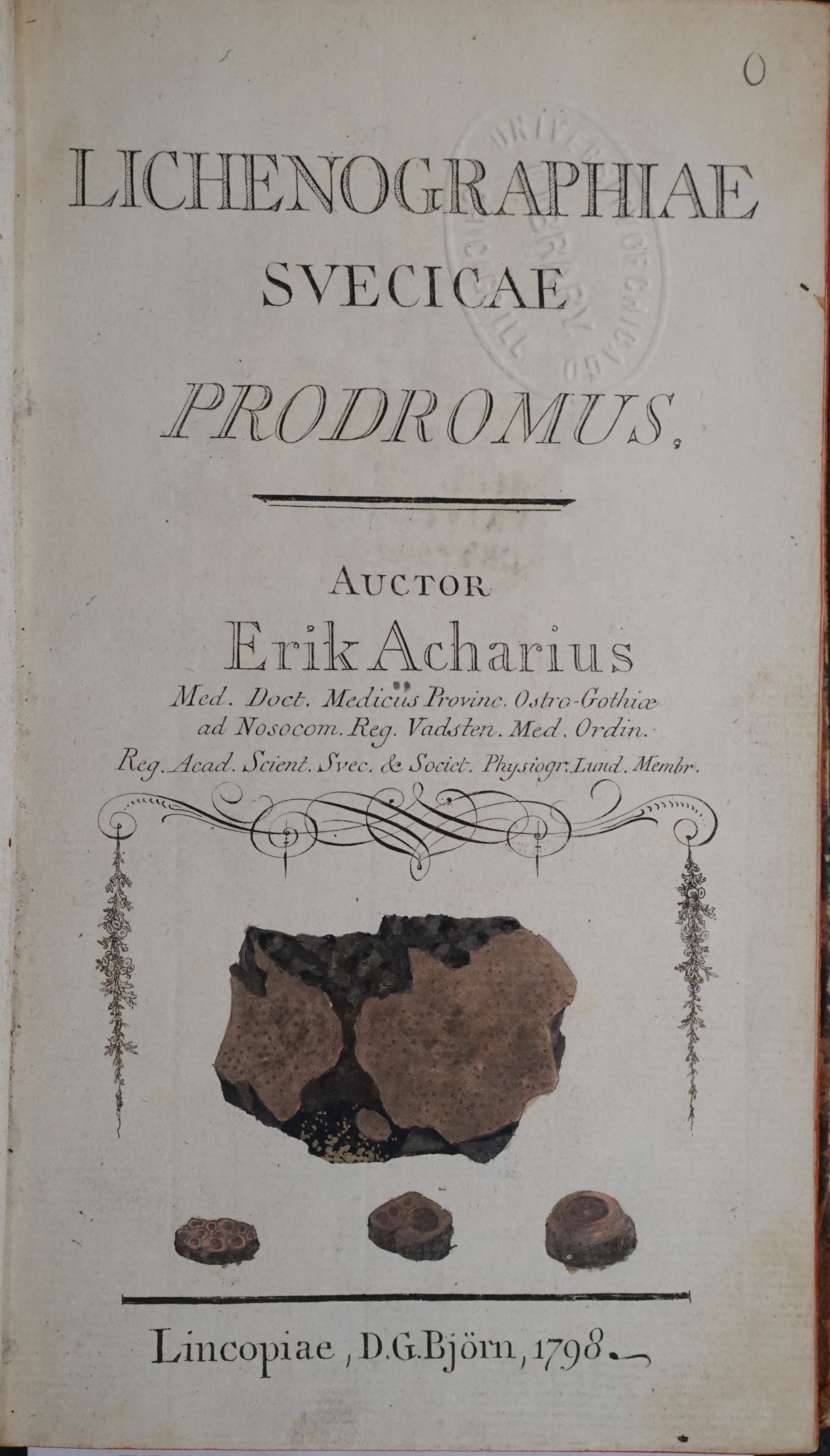
Title page of Erik Acharius's first work Lichenographia svecicae Prodromus (1798).

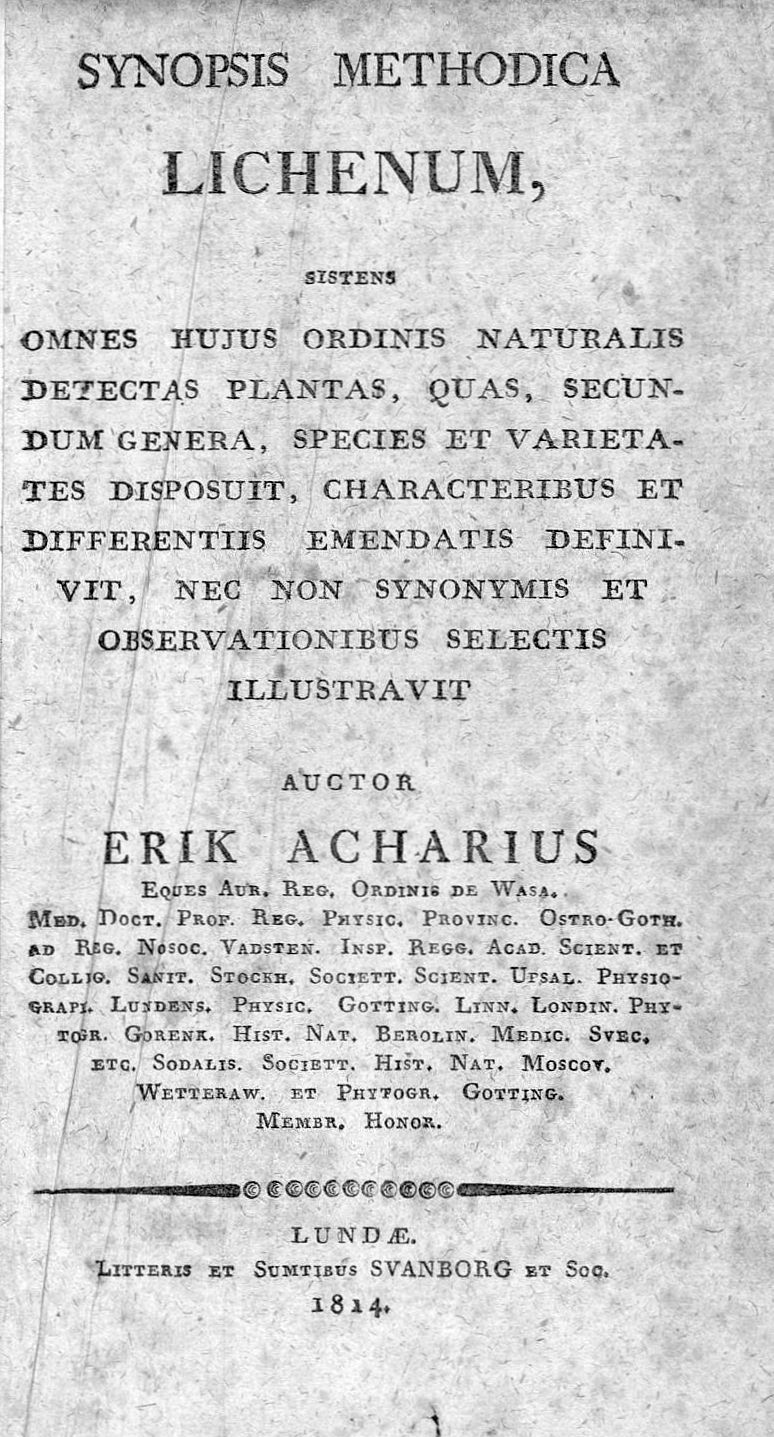
Synopsis methodica lichenum, 1814

He was a member of the Royal Physiographic Society in Lund (1795), the Royal Swedish Academy of Sciences (1796), the Linnean Society of London (1801), appointed Knight of the Order of Vasa (1809), and the Royal Society of Sciences in Uppsala (1810).

The plant genus Acharia (in 1794,), several plants species (e.g., Rosa acharii, and (type of lichen), Conferva acharii) and one insect, Tortrix achariana have all been named after Acharius.

The collections of Acharius are distributed over several museums: the Finnish Museum of Natural History in Helsinki, which holds the Botanical Museum in Uppsala, the Swedish Museum of Natural History and the Botanical Museum in Lund. His papers are in the Library of Uppsala University. There are also specimens that he collected in the Natural History Museum, London.

The following is a list of Erik Acharius's publications:

Lichenographiae svecicae Prodromus (Beginning of a Lichenography of Sweden) 1798

Methodus qua omnes detectos Lichenes (A Method by which Everyone Can Identify Lichens) 1803

Lichenographia universalis (A Universal Lichenography) 1810

Synopsis methodica Lichenum (Taxonomical Arrangement of Lichens) 1814

== See also ==
- List of mycologists
