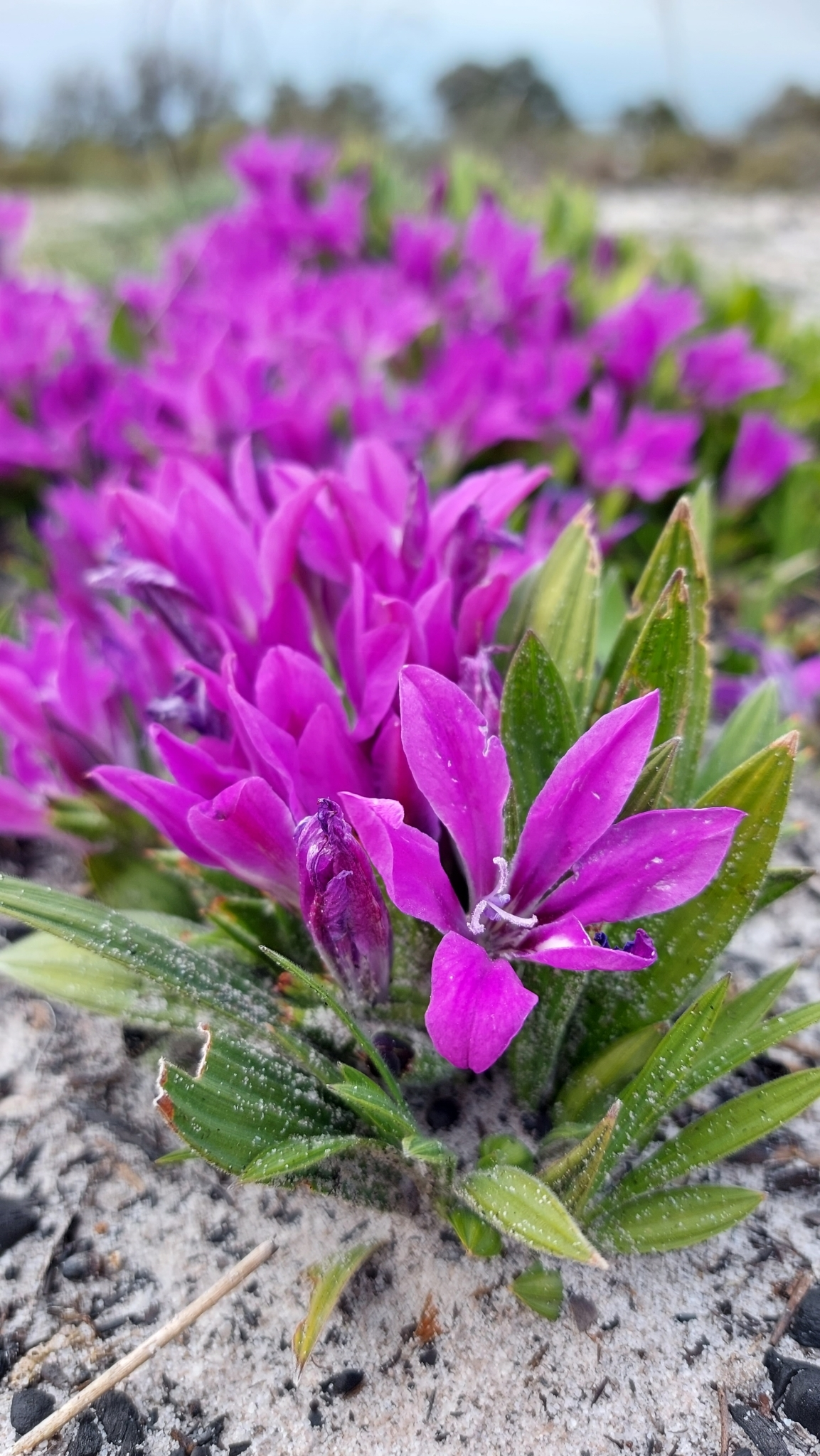
- ↑subsp. nana, ↓subsp. maculata
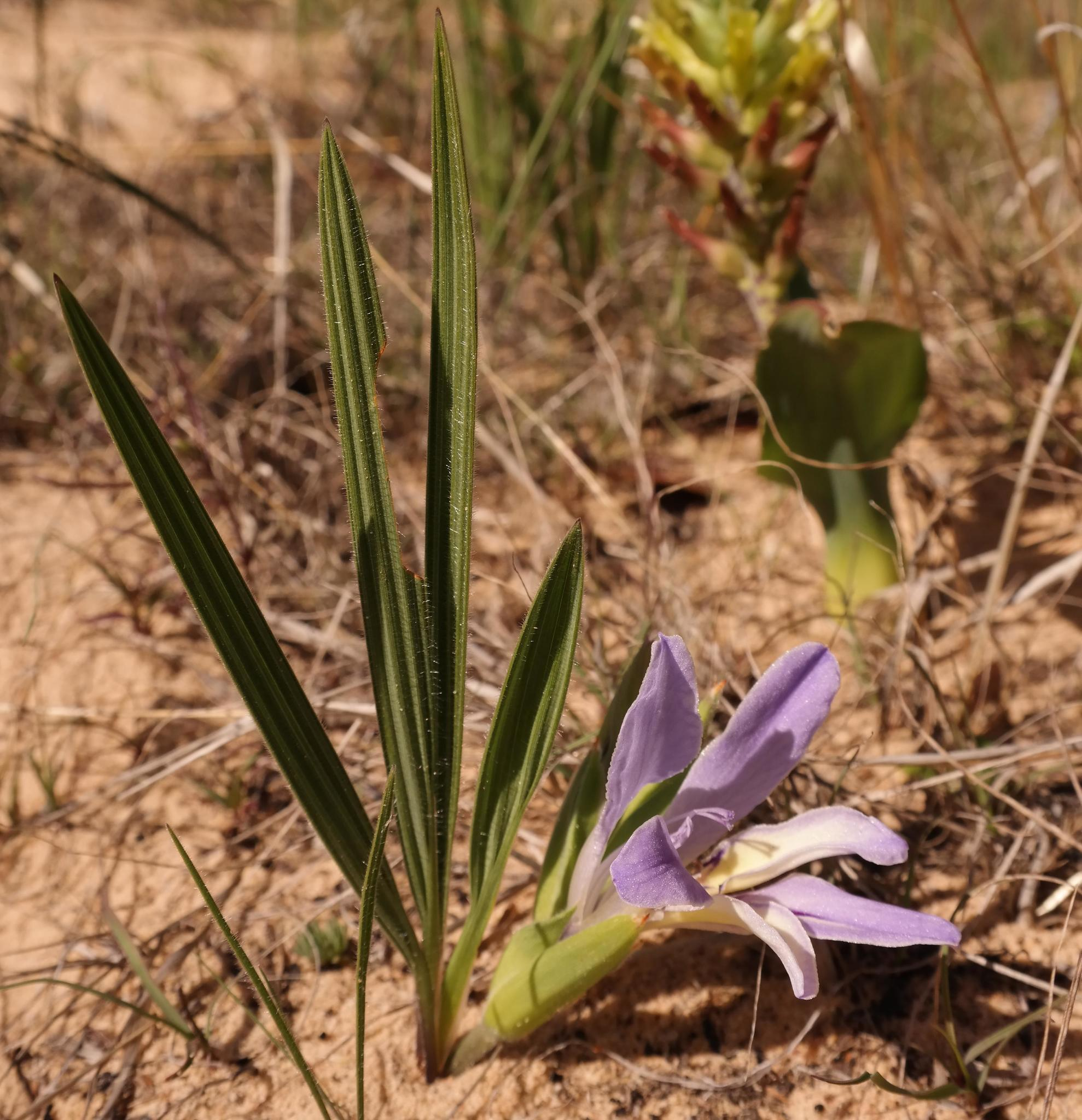

Scientific classification
- Kingdom: Plantae
- Clade: Tracheophytes
- Clade: Angiosperms
- Clade: Monocots
- Order: Asparagales
- Family: Iridaceae
- Genus: Babiana
- Species: B. nana

Binomial name
- Babiana nana (Andrews) Spreng.

Subspecies
- Babiana nana subsp. nana; Babiana nana subsp. maculata (Klatt) Goldblatt & J.C.Manning

= Babiana nana =

Species of flowering plant

Babiana nana is a species of geophyte of 6–15 cm (2.4–5.9 in) high that is assigned to the family Iridaceae. It has leaves that consist of a sheath and a blade that are at an angle with each other. The leaf blades are oval to almost line-shaped and have a left and right surface, rather than an upper and lower surface. The leaf blades are moderately pleated and covered in dense, soft hairs. The inflorescence contains two to six blue to violet or pale pink flowers adorned with white markings on the lower lip, and with three stamens crowding under the upper lip. Flowering occurs from late August to the end of September. The flowers emit a smell reminiscent of roses or violets.

== Description ==
Babiana nana is a geophytic perennial plant of 6–15 cm (2.4–5.9 in) high. Most of its stem can be found underground and can be branched. The plants lack a fibrous collar around the stem that is visible at the surface of the soil, but the stem appears above the ground. The leaves consist of a sheath that encloses the sheaths of higher leaves and of a blade that is almost upright or at an angle to the sheath. The leaf blade is densely softly hairy, laterally compressed, meaning it has a right and left, rather than an upper and lower side, and its surface is not flat but slightly to moderately pleated, meaning that the surfaces of the leaf abruptly and repetitively change angle at the location of one of the veins. The outline of the leaf blade is oval to narrowly lance-shaped in subsp. nana, or narrowly lance-shaped to almost line-shaped in subsp. maculata. The leaf blades are not coiled, their margins do not undulate, and their tips are pointy to blunt but do not end in several irregular teeth.

The upright or somewhat inclined inflorescence consists of two to six mirror-symmetrical flowers, each of which is subtended by two entirely green, densely hairy bracts of 16–30 mm (0.63–1.18 in) long, the outer bract slightly longer compared to the inner. The inner bract is forked only at the tip, which is different from many other species that have more deeply forked inner bracts or inner bracts that are split entirely to the base. The flowers have an oblique funnel-shaped perianth tube of 12–17 mm (0.47–0.67 in) long and splits into six tepals, the upper three slightly larger than the others at 25–30 mm (0.98–1.18 in) long, the three lower merged over a short distance and 22–25 mm (0.87–0.98 in)long. The perianth is violet to blue or rarely pale pink, with the lower lateral tepals carrying white or cream-coloured markings. Usually the flowers have a strong rose-violet scent. The three filaments are crowding at the side of the dorsal tepal, 10–14 mm (0.39–0.55 in) long, and topped by anthers of 5–6.5 mm (0.20–0.26 in) long. The inferior ovary is smooth or sometimes has short hairs on the ribs only. The style divides in three branches, generally opposite the tip of the anthers or slightly higher, the branches being 3–5 mm (0.12–0.20 in) long. Flowering occurs from late August to late September.

=== Differences with similar species ===
B. nana may be confused with B.ambigua, a species that flowers from late July to late August, with flowering stems entirely buried in the soil and the inner bracts split to the base.

== Taxonomy ==
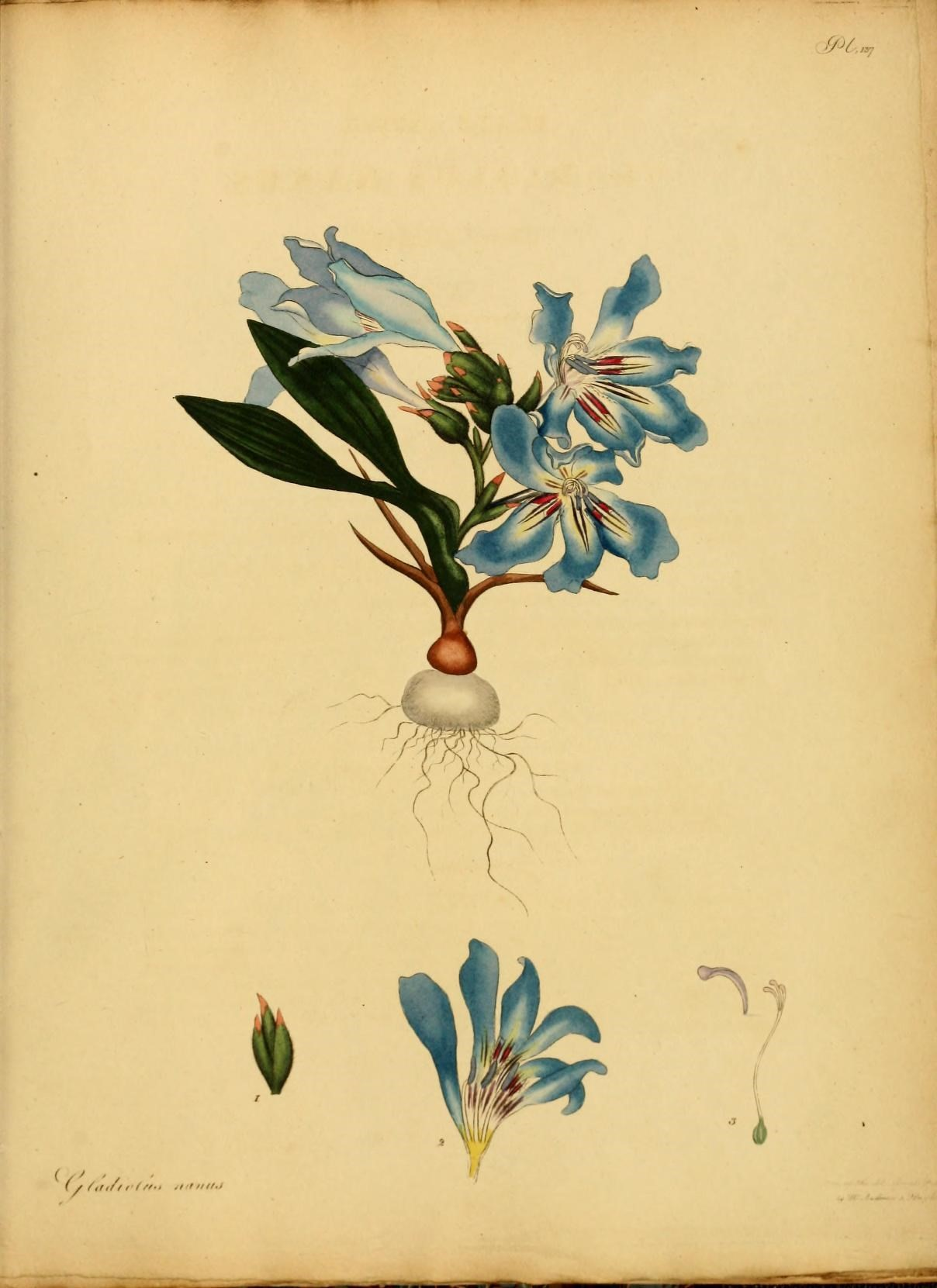
The original illustration by Henry Cranke Andrews from The botanist's repository

In 1801, the English botanist, botanical artist and engraver Henry Cranke Andrews described Gladiolus nanus. In 1825, Curt Polycarp Joachim Sprengel assigned the species to the genus Babiana that had been erected by John Bellenden Ker Gawler in 1802, so creating the new combination Babiana nana. In 1827, Christian Friedrich Ecklon named B. angustifolia, but failed to publish its description, and on top of that, this name was no longer available since Robert Sweet had already used it earlier that year. Friedrich Wilhelm Klatt named Ecklon's taxon in 1882 B. maculata. In the Flora Capensis of 1896, John Gilbert Baker described B. pygmaea (not B. pygmaea Burm.f.) and B. sprengelii. In 1959, Gwendoline Joyce Lewis considered both of Baker's names as synonyms of B. nana. Lewis distinguished three varieties, B. nana var. nana, B. nana var. angustifolia, and B. nana var. confusa. Bertil Nordenstam made the new combination B. nana var. maculata in 1970. In 2007, Peter Goldblatt and John Charles Manning considered B. nana var. confusa as a separate species, Babiana confusa.

== Distribution, ecology and conservation ==
Babiana nana subsp. nana can be found in an area bordering the west coast in the Western Cape province of South Africa. Here it used to occur between Saldanha on the Vredenburg Peninsula in the north to Milnerton in the south, but it is now extinct in the southern parts of its range. It grows on sandy plains and dunes including in the vegetation types Atlantis Sand Fynbos, Cape Flats Dune Strandveld, Cape Flats Sand Fynbos, Hopefield Sand Fynbos, Langebaan Dune Strandveld, Saldanha Flats Strandveld, Saldanha Granite Strandveld, and Swartland Granite Renosterveld. It is considered an endangered taxon, because its populations are severely fragmented, and this subspecies is declining primarily due to alien plant invasion and coastal development, with a range of at most 1,400 km^{2} (540 mi^{2}). Babiana nana subsp. maculata occurs along the south coast of the Western Cape province between the Cape Peninsula in the west to Mossel Bay in the east. Here it grows in dunes and on sandy coastal flats. It is a near-threatened taxon because its current range is severely fragmented and its habitat is lost on an extensive scale due to competition by alien plants, conversion for agriculture and coastal urban development, but its range is much larger at 36,000 km^{2} (14,000 mi^{2}).
