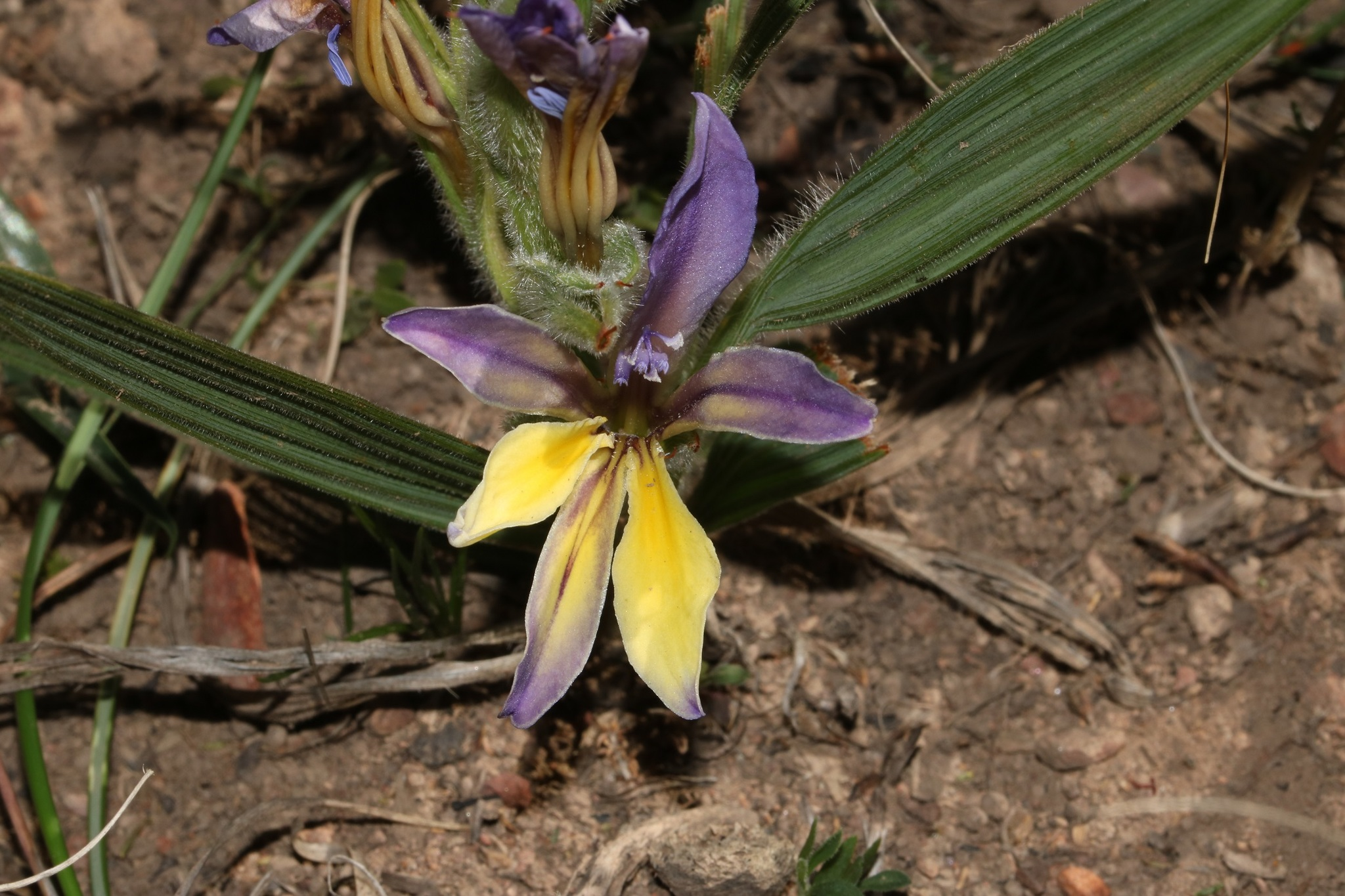

Scientific classification
- Kingdom: Plantae
- Clade: Tracheophytes
- Clade: Angiosperms
- Clade: Monocots
- Order: Asparagales
- Family: Iridaceae
- Genus: Babiana
- Species: B. patula

Binomial name
- Babiana patula N.E.Br.

= Babiana patula =

Species of flowering plant

Babiana patula is a perennial flowering plant and geophyte belonging to the genus Babiana and is part of the fynbos. The species is endemic to the Western Cape and occurs from Tulbagh to Albertinia. The plant has a range of 20 000 km^{2} and has lost 60% of its habitat to development, crop cultivation and invasive plants over 80 years.
