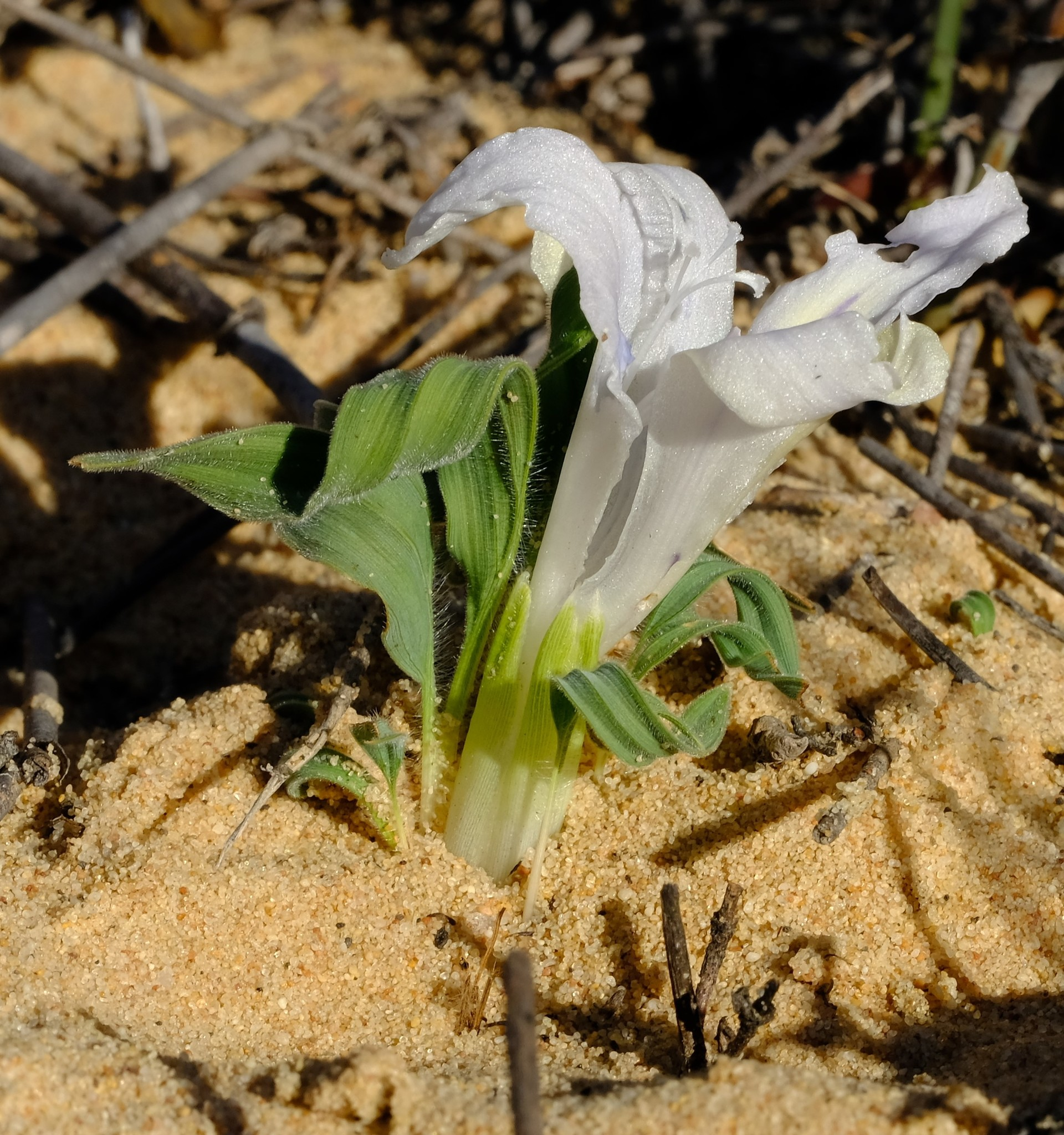

Scientific classification
- Kingdom: Plantae
- Clade: Tracheophytes
- Clade: Angiosperms
- Clade: Monocots
- Order: Asparagales
- Family: Iridaceae
- Genus: Babiana
- Species: B. confusa

Binomial name
- Babiana confusa (G.J.Lewis) Goldblatt & J.C.Manning, (2007)

Synonyms
- Babiana nana var. confusa G.J.Lewis

= Babiana confusa =

Species of flowering plant

Babiana confusa is a perennial flowering plant and geophyte belonging to the genus Babiana and is part of the fynbos and succulent Karoo. The species is endemic to the Northern Cape and the Western Cape. It occurs from the south of Namaqualand, the Groenriver to Hopefield and has a range of 9 825 km². The species is relatively unknown and it is suspected that there are still undiscovered subpopulations. Currently, eight subpopulations are known. In the south of the plant's range, some of its habitat has been lost to crop cultivation e.g. potatoes and rooibos tea.
