= Babiana montana =

Scientific classification
- Kingdom: Plantae
- Clade: Tracheophytes
- Clade: Angiosperms
- Clade: Monocots
- Order: Asparagales
- Family: Iridaceae
- Genus: Babiana
- Species: B. montana

Binomial name
- Babiana montana G.J.Lewis

Species of flowering plant

Babiana montana, the Agulhas baboon flower, is a perennial flowering plant and geophyte belonging to the genus Babiana. The species is endemic to the Western Cape and occurs from Caledon to Bredasdorp. The plant has a range of just under 3 000 km^{2} and is part of the fynbos and renosterveld. However, it has lost more than 70% of its habitat to grain cultivation in the past 70 years. The remaining three subpopulations are threatened by invasive plants and overgrazing by livestock.
