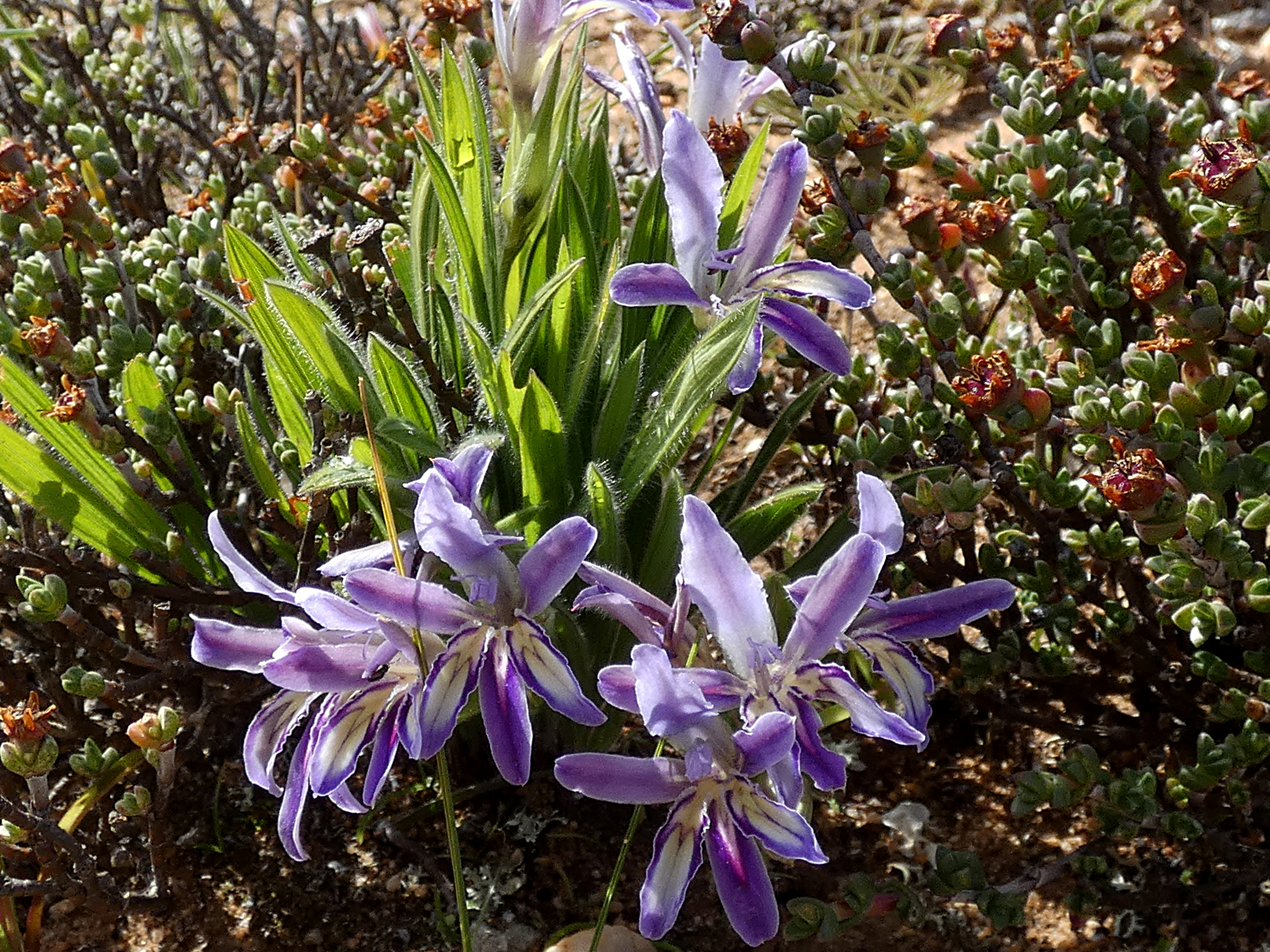
- subsp. minor↑, subsp. mucronata↓
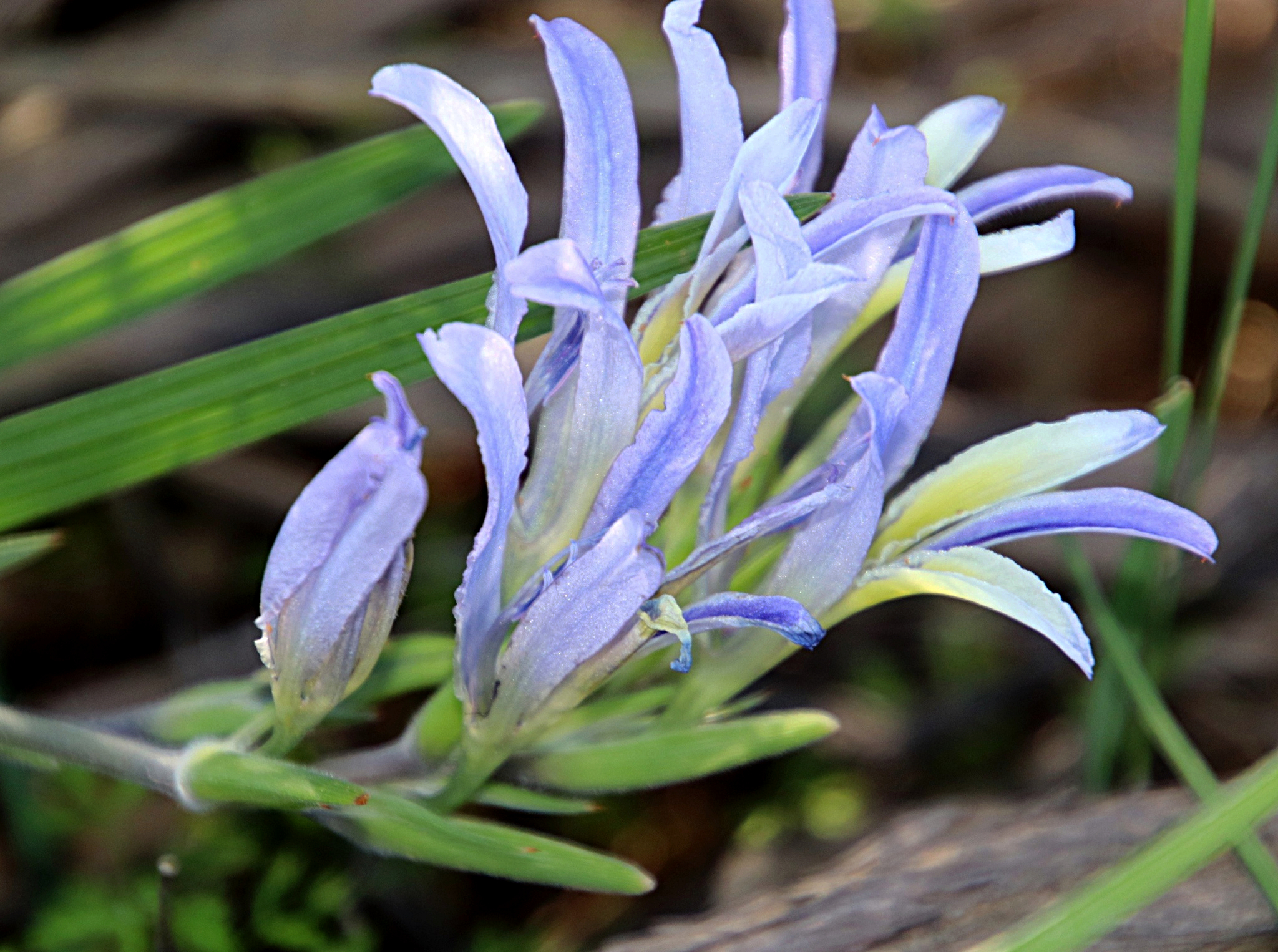

Scientific classification
- Kingdom: Plantae
- Clade: Tracheophytes
- Clade: Angiosperms
- Clade: Monocots
- Order: Asparagales
- Family: Iridaceae
- Genus: Babiana
- Species: B. mucronata

Binomial name
- Babiana mucronata (Jacq.) Ker-Gawl.

Subspecies
- Babiana mucronata subsp. mucronata; Babiana mucronata subsp. minor (G.J.Lewis) Goldblatt & J.C.Manning

= Babiana mucronata =

Species of flowering plant

Babiana mucronata is a perennial plant species that grows to about 5–18 cm (2.0–7.1 in) high and annually forms leaves and flowers from an underground corm. It is assigned to the iris family. It has a simple or branched, more or less upright spike of 3-12 dark to pale violet-blue, mirror-symmetrical flowers. Each flower consists of a perianth that is merged below into a funnel-shaped tube of 10–25 mm (0.39–0.98 in) long but splits into six unequal tepals. Three stamens are curved, crowded near the upper lip, and carry pale violet anthers. Flowers may be found between late July and September.

== Description ==
Babiana mucronata is a perennial plant of about 5–18 cm (2.0–7.1 in) high that annually forms leaves and flowers from an underground corm of up to 2.5 cm (0.98 in) in diameter. The leaves are line- to sickle-shaped, slightly pleated, thinly hairy or hairless and 7–20 mm (0.28–0.79 in) wide.

It has a simple or branched, more or less upright or outward bending spike of at least 3, but usually 6-12, dark to pale violet-blue, acrid- or metallic smelling or sometimes odourless, mirror-symmetrical flowers. The underground part of the stem is surrounded by a thick, fibrous collar. Each flower is subtended by two bracts that are green except for a dry russet tip. The outer bract is squared-off, blunt or has three teeth. The inner bract is only half as long as the outer or only slightly shorter and split all the way to the base. The perianth is merged below into a narrowly funnel-shaped tube of 10–25 mm (0.39–0.98 in) long. It splits into six unequal tepals towards the top. The dorsal tepal forms the upper lip and is 25–35 mm (0.98–1.38 in) long. The remaining tepals together form the lower lip, are merged for 3–5 mm (0.12–0.20 in) further, and the lower tepals are 15–18 mm (0.59–0.71 in) long and adorned with white to pale yellow blotches that are offset with a darker violet-blue edge. Three stamens are crowded near the upper lip and consist of curved filaments of 13–16 mm (0.51–0.63 in) long that carry pale violet or turquoise anthers of 5–7 mm (0.20–0.28 in) long. Below the perianth sits a densely hairy ovary that carries the style that splits into three branches of 3–4 mm (0.12–0.16 in) long opposite the middle half of the anthers. Flowers may be found between late July and September.

=== Differences between the subspecies ===
B. mucronata subsp. mucronata is mostly 15–35 mm (0.59–1.38 in) high with the inflorescence mostly extending beyond the leaves and the perianth tube 15–25 mm (0.59–0.98 in) long, while B. mucronata subsp. minor is mostly 5–8 cm (2.0–3.1 in) high, with the inflorescence shorter than the leaves and the perianth tube 10–14 mm (0.39–0.55 in) long.

=== Differences with similar species ===
Other species in the section Babiana with blue flowers have stems that are almost entirely underground with the leaves extending beyond the inflorescence. B. lineolata also produces a high inflorescence that is longer that the leaves, but it has narrow, rigid and heavily pleated leaves, floral bracts of 7–10 mm (0.28–0.39 in) only, and pale blue flowers.

== Taxonomy and naming ==
This species was first described by Nikolaus Joseph von Jacquin in 1794 and he named it Gladiolus mucronatus. It was based on a specimen that was collected somewhere in South Africa and illustrated by Von Jacquin in part 2, plate 253 of his Icones rariorum plantarum. John Bellenden Ker Gawler in 1802 proposed to use the genus name Babiana for the species of bobbejaantjie. Ker Gawler included Jacquin's species and created the new name Babiana mucronata. In 1959, Gwendoline Joyce Lewis distinguished Babiana mucronata var. longituba, a form with a longer than average perianth tube. She also distinguished var. minor, that differs by being smaller and having flowers with shorter perianth tubes which are shorter than the leaves, and Babiana klaverensis, that has narrower leaves with a thickened margin. Peter Goldblatt and John Charles Manning in their 2007 revision of the genus, considered var. longituba as synonymous to Babiana mucronata var. mucronata, raised the status of var. minor to subsp. minor, and included B. klaverensis in subsp. minor.

The species name mucronata is derived from the Latin word mucro, which is a reference to the pointed, often sharp extension of the mid vein that extends beyond the abruptly terminating leaf.

== Distribution, ecology and conservation ==
Olifantsbobbejaantjie can be found in the Western Cape province of South Africa, between Tulbagh and Piketberg in the south and the Pakhuis Pass and the Olifants River Mountains in the north. Here it grows on rocky outcrops, stony clay and sandstone rubble on slopes and flats. The continued survival of Babiana mucronata subsp. mucronata is considered to be of least concern. Babiana mucronata subsp. minor grows on sandy soils in vegetation types known as Nardouw Sandstone Fynbos and Bokkeveld Sandstone Fynbos, on the Gifberg and its slopes and the Bokkeveld Mountains, where it is only known from five locations, which are vulnerable to development for rooibos cultivation, and it is therefore considered endangered.
