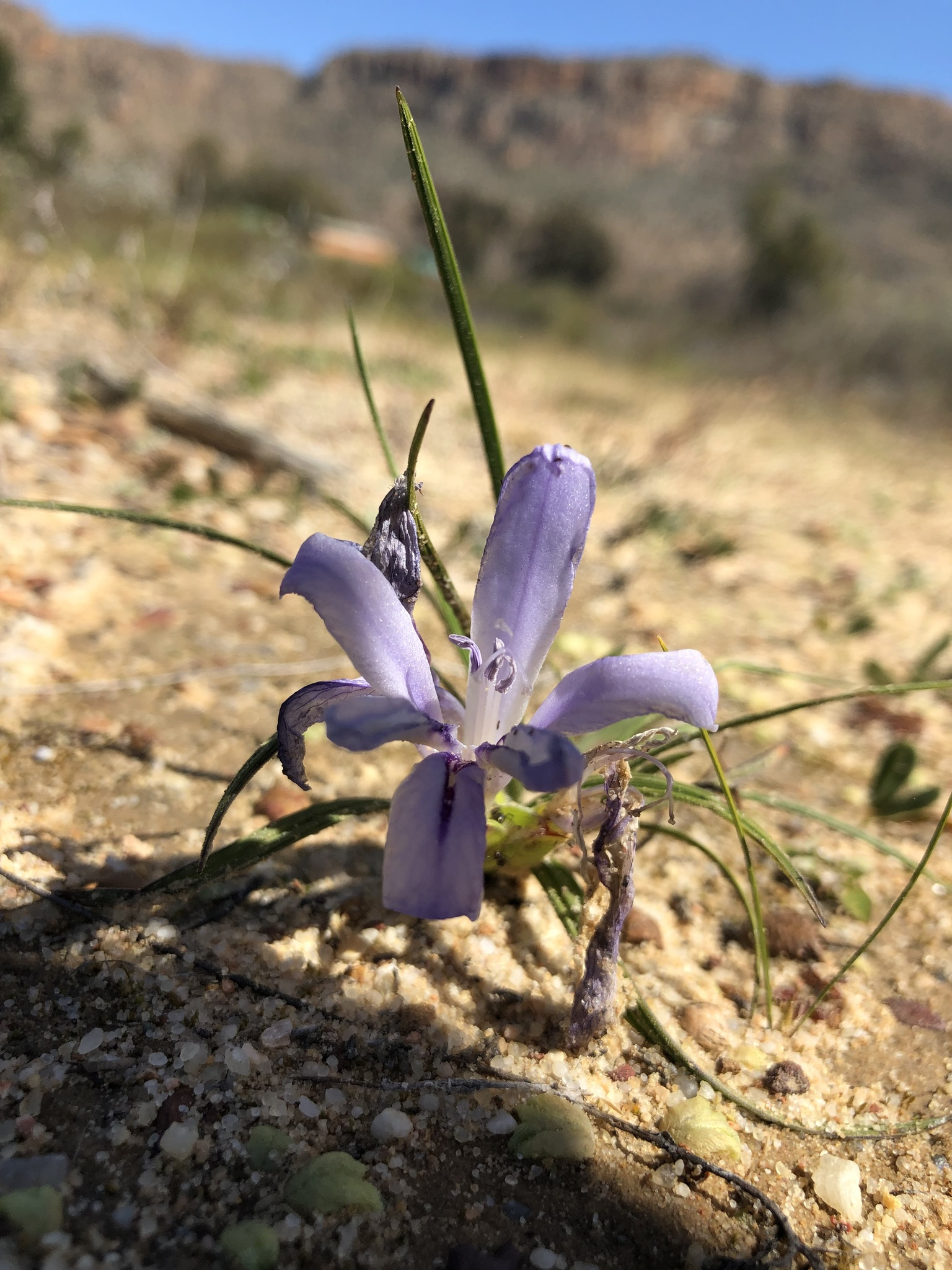

Scientific classification
- Kingdom: Plantae
- Clade: Embryophytes
- Clade: Tracheophytes
- Clade: Spermatophytes
- Clade: Angiosperms
- Clade: Monocots
- Order: Asparagales
- Family: Iridaceae
- Genus: Babiana
- Species: B. cedarbergensis

Binomial name
- Babiana cedarbergensis G.J.Lewis

= Babiana cedarbergensis =

Species of flowering plant

Babiana cedarbergensis is a perennial geophytic flowering plant of 4–6 cm (1.6–2.4 in) high that has been assigned to the family Iridaceae. It has rigid, pleated, velvety hairy, sword-shaped leaves of 4-6 cm long and 2-5 pale blue to violet mirror-symmetrical flowers consisting of 6 tepals that are merged into a tube at their base and smell slightly musky. The lower tepals have white marking with dark blue outliners. It is pollinated by long-tongued flies and probably also long-tongued bees. The species grows in fynbos in the Cederberg at an altitude of around 1 km. It is called Cederberg Bobbejaantjie in Afrikaans.

== Description ==
The Cederberg bobbejaantjie grows from an underground corm and attains a height of 4-6 cm and its stem is surrounded by a thick, fibrous collar particularly underground. It has 4-6 cm long, velvety hairy, pleated, rigid, sword-shaped leaved with a hard, pointy tip and entire, plane leaf margins. The bracts that subtend each flower are 18–25 mm (0.71–0.98 in) long, green and fresh sometimes with exception of the tiny extension of the primary vein at the tip of the bract. The inner bract, situated between the flower and the stem is slightly smaller than the outer, forked for about one third and has whitish, translucent margins. The slightly musk-scented, deep to pale violet, mirror-symmetrical flowers sit with 2-5 in a decumbent spike. The six tepals are merge at their base into an obliquely funnel-shaped tube of 16–18 mm (0.63–0.71 in) long, that contains nectar in the lower half. At 28–35 mm (1.1–1.4 in) long the dorsal tepal, that is closest to the stem, is larger than the others. The remaining five tepals are merged for about 3 mm (0.12 in) more than with the dorsal tepal and jointly for a prominent lower lip of 21–27 mm (0.83–1.06 in) long. The lower, lateral tepals have white markings with a dark blue outline. The tree stamens are clustered below the dorsal petal and consist of arched Filaments at the base, topped by about 13 mm (0.51 in) long anthers. The ovary is hairy above its base and is topped by the style which splits into 3 branches of about 4 mm long at or above the tips of the anthers.

=== Differences with resembling species ===
The Cederberg bobbejaantjie looks a lot like the common bobbejaantjie, particularly sharing sword-shaped leaves and flowers close to the ground. However, the inner floral bract is split to its base, the fibrous neck around the base of the stem is poorly developed, the leaves are firm but not rigid, and the ovary is hairless in the common bobbiaantjie. This contrasts with the inner bract insised for one-third, the prominent collar, the rigid leaves and the haiy ovary.

== Taxonomy ==
The Cederberg bobbejaantjie was first scientifically described by Gwendoline Joyce Lewis in 1959 in her revision of the genus, based on a collection made in 1930.

== Distribution, ecology and conservation ==
The Cederberg bobbejaantjie only naturally occurs in the eastern Cederberg region on rocky sandstone flats. It is known from 12 locations, but it does not appear to be declining since it grows in a habitat unsuited for agriculture and many of the locations lie in the Cederberg Wilderness Area. The flowers are visited by the long-tongued fly Prosoeca peringueyi. The continued survival of this species is considered to be of Least Concern.
