= Flora Capensis =

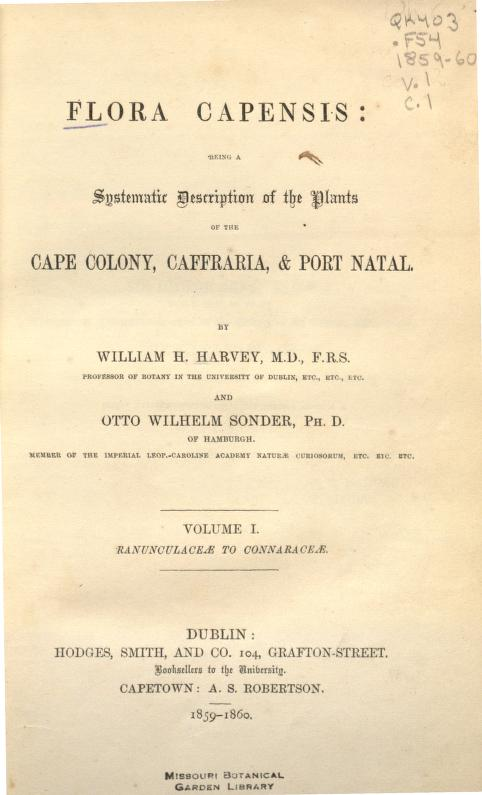
- William H. Harvey, Otto H. Sonder, Flora Capensis, 1859-1860, title page
- Author: William Henry Harvey, Otto Wilhelm Sonder
- Original title: Flora Capensis; being a systematic description of the plants of the Cape Colony, Caffraria, & port Natal.
- Series: Six volumes, supplement
- Subject: Botany
- Publisher: Hodges, Smith and Co., Dublin, and A.S. Robertson, Cape Town
- Publication date: 1860–1933
- Publication place: South Africa
- Media type: book

Flora Capensis is a book that describes the flora found in colonial South Africa, encompassing the Cape Colony, Kaffraria and the Colony of Natal, as it was known during the second half of the 19th century. Creating the book was suggested by the famous English botanist Sir William Jackson Hooker. William Henry Harvey and Otto Wilhelm Sonder took up the work of writing the first three volumes of the Flora Capensis, which were published between 1860 and 1865 by Hodges, Smith and Co. in Dublin, and A.S. Robertson in Cape Town. Parts 4 to 6 were edited by William Turner Thiselton-Dyer and issued over the following decades, with the supplement published in 1933.
