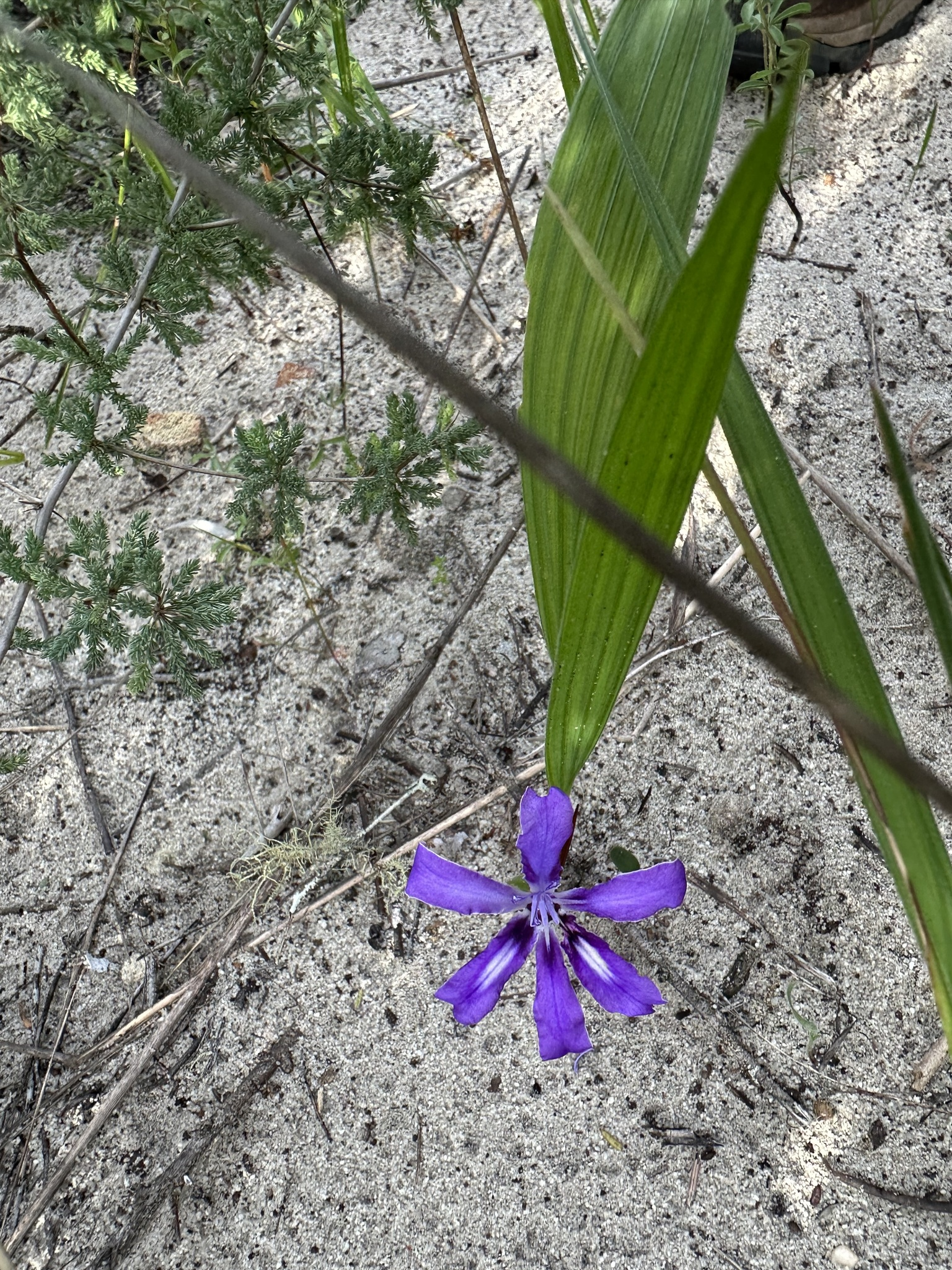

Scientific classification
- Kingdom: Plantae
- Clade: Tracheophytes
- Clade: Angiosperms
- Clade: Monocots
- Order: Asparagales
- Family: Iridaceae
- Genus: Babiana
- Species: B. petiolata

Binomial name
- Babiana petiolata Goldblatt & J.C.Manning

= Babiana petiolata =

Species of flowering plant

Babiana petiolata is a species of geophytic, perennial flowering plant in the family Iridaceae. The species is endemic to the Western Cape and is part of the fynbos. It occurs from Velddrif to Lamberts Bay. It has an area of occurrence of 175 km^{2} and there are four subpopulations. The plant has lost habitat to the planting of potato fields. Currently, the species is threatened by coastal development and mining activities.

== Description ==
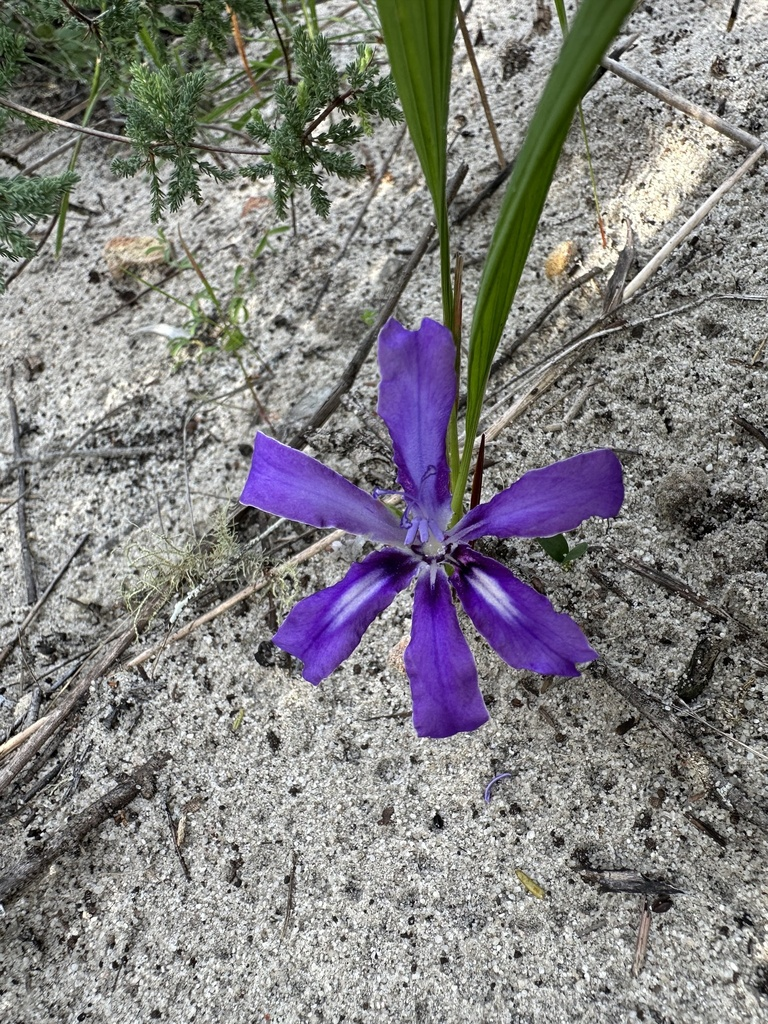
detail of the flower

Babiana petiolata is a perennial of 8–14 cm (3.1–5.5 in) high including its leaves, that emerges each growing season from an underground corm. The hairless stem is entirely underground, without or with one or two sidebranches, without the collar of fibres around base that is characteristic for the vast majority of other Babiana species, reproducing vegetatively by producing small cormlets from the first node above the corm. The lance- to sword-shaped leaves are shallowly pleated, thinly covered in rough papillae to virtually smooth, often on a cylindrical false petiole of 5–40 mm (0.20–1.57 in) long. The leaves arch forward and are concave with its margins facing toward the ground and that are sometimes thickened. The two hairless bracts that subtend each flower are 15–20 mm (0.59–0.79 in) long. The outer bract is keeled above and sparsely hairy on the keel and margins, with a blunt tip, and pale brown margins. The inner bract has sparsely hairy keels, is slightly shorter than outer, divided all the way to the base, and has broad membranous margins. The four to six violet mirror-symmetrical flowers are set in an inclined spike and have a faint iris-like scent. The lower tepals have pale yellow markings, reddish near the base. The perianth tube is obliquely funnel-shaped, about 11 mm (0.43 in) long, the lower cylinder-shaped part is about 7 mm (0.28 in) long. The tepals are unequal, with the dorsal tepal held slightly apart from the others, about 30 mm × 8 mm (1.18 in × 0.31 in), the upper lateral tepals smaller, the lower three tepals merged to the upper lateral tepals for about 5 mm (0.20 in) and to one another for about 3 mm (0.12 in), the lower median tepal narrowing below to a channelled claw. The stamens are crowded near the dorsal tepal and have curved filaments are about 12 mm (0.47 in) long and topped by about 6 mm long pale violet anthers that release cream-coloured pollen. The hairless egg-shaped ovary is about 4 mm (0.16 in) long. The style arches over the stamens, and divides into three branches of about 5 mm (0.20 in) long opposite the tips of the anthers and widen at their tips. Flowers mostly occur in July.

== Distribution and ecology ==
Babiana petiolata occurs in the Western Cape province of South Africa between the towns of Lambert's Bay and Velddrif, where it can be found on flat sandy soils in the strandveld near the coast. This species flowers during the late winter. It was only relatively recently described, likely because hardly any collecting was undertaken in its distribution area so early in the season and the plants are inconspicuous when in fruit. However, this plant species seems relatively common in a narrow band of strandveld.
