= Christian Konrad Sprengel =

German botanist (1750–1816)

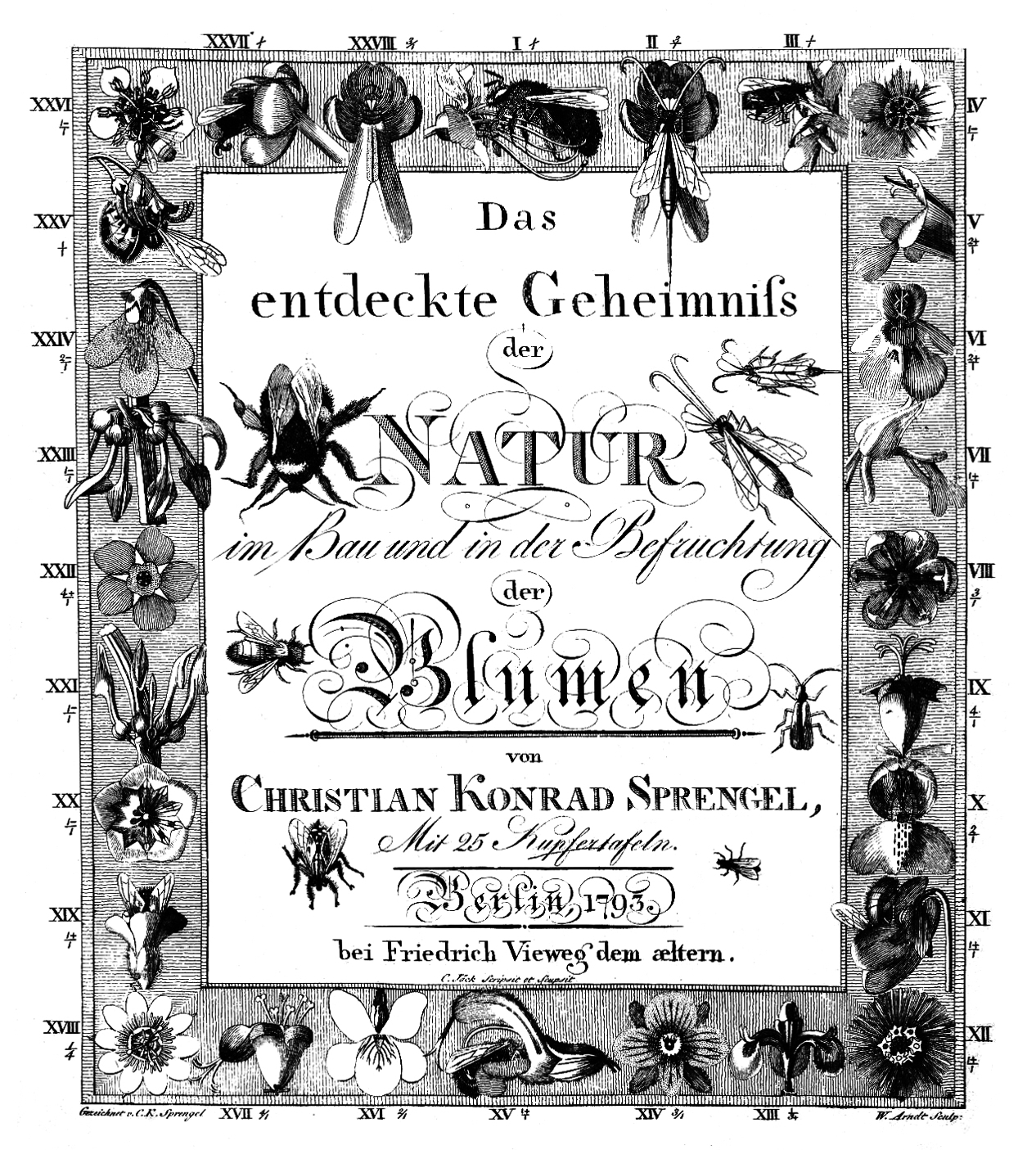
- Cover page of Sprengel's landmark book (1793)
- Born: 22 September 1750; Brandenburg an der Havel
- Died: 7 April 1816 (aged 65); Berlin
- Education: University of Halle-Wittenberg
- Known for: plant sexuality
- Scientific career
- Fields: natural history

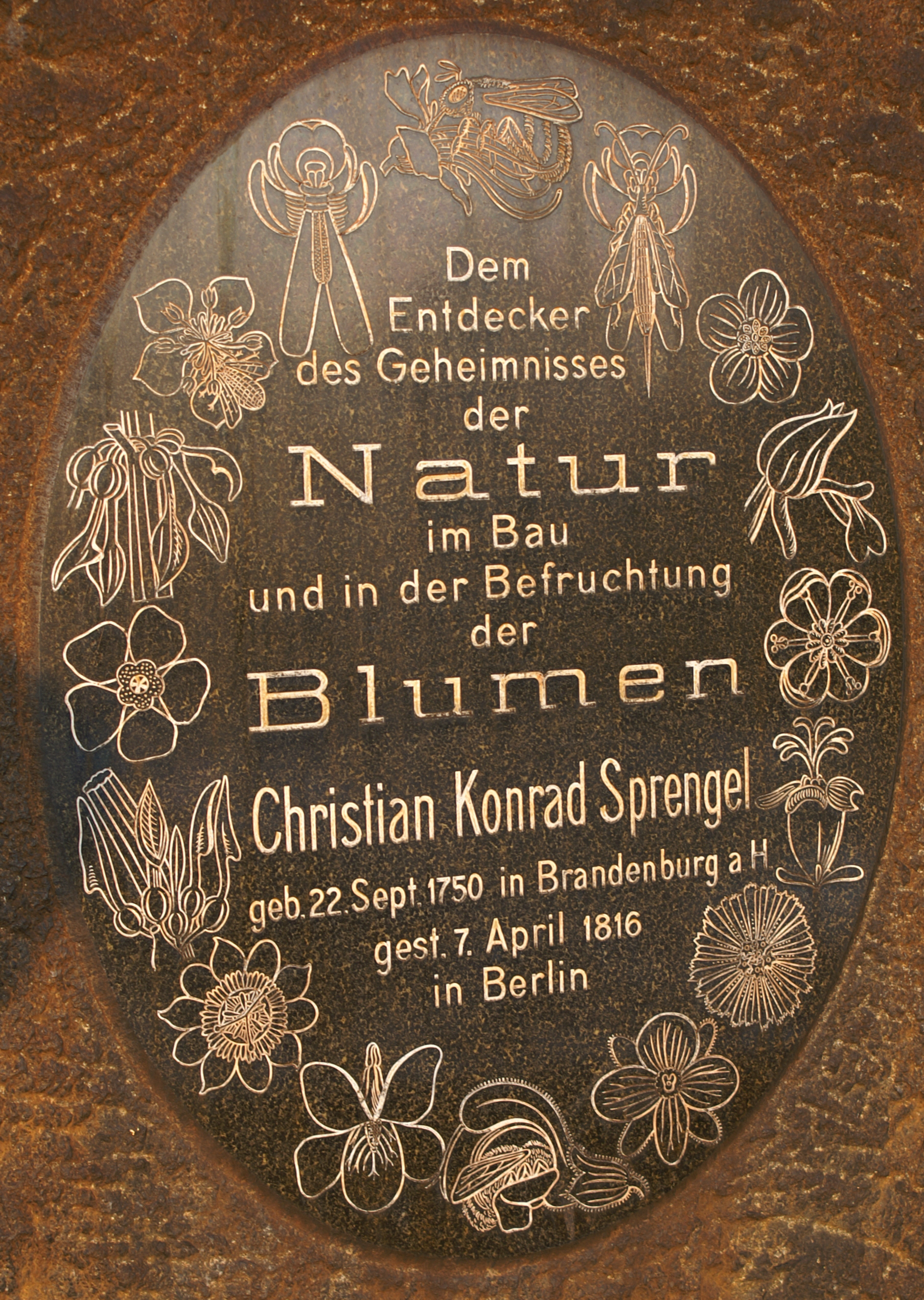
A small monument designed after the frontispiece of Spengel's fundamental work can be seen in Berlin Botanical Gardens. It was erected by Adolf Engler in 1917 after the 100th anniversary of Sprengel's death.

Christian Konrad Sprengel (22 September 1750 – 7 April 1816) was a German naturalist, theologist, and teacher. He is most famous for his research on plant sexuality. Sprengel was the first to recognize that the function of flowers was to attract insects, and that nature favored cross-pollination. Along with the work of Joseph Gottlieb Kölreuter he set the foundations for the modern study of floral biology and anthecology, but his work was not widely recognized until Charles Darwin examined and confirmed several of his observations almost 50 years later; see Fertilisation of Orchids (1862).

== Life ==
Sprengel was born in Brandenburg an der Havel in the Margraviate of Brandenburg. He was the 15th and the last son of a preacher Ernst Victor Sprengel and his second wife Dorothea Gnadenreich Schaeffer (died 1778). Ernst Victor's father had been an organist and he himself was a choirmaster, teacher and later archdeacon. Christian Konrad was expected to continue the traditional profession, and he studied theology in Halle. In 1774, in Berlin, he became a teacher and in 1780 moved to Spandau to head the Great Lutheran Town School. His interest in plants began around the age of 30 when he was advised by his surgeon to spend time outdoors for the health of his eyes. The surgeon was Ernst Ludwig Heim, an amateur mycologist and botanist who also influenced Alexander von Humboldt.

Sprengel undertook the study of plants, collaborating with Carl Ludwig Willdenow on his work Florae Berolinensis Prodromus (1787). He then proceeded to specifically study the pollination of plants, especially the interaction between flowers and their insect visitors in what was later called pollination syndrome. From his considerable research Sprengel published his first work, Das entdeckte Geheimnis der Natur im Bau und in der Befruchtung der Blumen (Berlin 1793), which established him as a founder of pollination ecology and floral biology as scientific disciplines. Together with Josef G. Köhlreuter, a predecessor, he is acknowledged as one of the two classic authors in this field. While conducting his research on plants, Sprengel appears to have neglected management of the school, which mainly served the rich and powerful. Sprengel was accused of mistreating some of the students. He was accused of punishing a mayor's son by making him stand in class and hitting him with a stick leading to injury. A nine-year-old son of a councillor was beaten up as were several other children. Sprengel was ultimately dismissed from service in 1784.

Sprengel subsequently lived on a pension and earnings from leading public outings on botanical field trips. He published a work on the usefulness of bees in 1811, suggesting that beehives be placed close to planted fields to enhance crop yield via bee pollination. Towards the end of his life, he returned to studying classical literature and published his last book on Roman Poets with his comments in 1815. He died on 7 April 1816 and is buried at the Invalidenfriedhof in Berlin. His gravesite is unmarked and no portrait of him is known to exist.

== The secret of nature discovered in the structure and pollination of flowers ==
During Sprengel's time scholars of natural science (naturalists), including botanist Joseph Gottlieb Kölreuter, viewed insects as only accidental or incidental visitors to flowers. They were seen as thieves of nectar which was considered a fluid meant to nourish the growing seed. (It was believed that the flower was the place for the marriage of the male and female parts and that self-fertilization was the norm.) Fertilization was understood by Kolreuter; he referred to pollen as farina fecundens (the "fertilizing flour"). Both Kolreuter and Sprengel believed in intelligent creation and sought and used teleological explanations of phenomena. (Like John Ray, Sprengel believed that observing nature was a kind of church service of beholding what "the wise Creator of nature had produced".)

Sprengel began various botanical observations in 1787. He noticed that the wood cranesbill (Geranium sylvaticum) had soft hairs on the lower part of the petals and came to a hypothesis that they protected nectar from rain in a way similar to those which eyebrows and eyelashes prevented sweat from entering the eye. He collaborated with Willdenow in describing Silene chlorantha (Willd.) Ehrh. (Caryophyllaceae), which was extremely rare in Berlin district. It took six years before Sprengel published the work of his own research. The book was based on the studies of 461 plants, presenting some 25 copperplate engravings based on his own drawings.

Sprengel identified that flowers were essentially organs adapted in their structures to attract insects, which events aided in pollinating the plant. He observed that nectar was an attractant and that petals had markings that guided insects to the nectar. He also observed dichogamy, both protogyny and protandry, and pointed out that these phenomena helped prevent self-pollination. He also noticed self-incompatibility. He classified insects as generalists and specialists and identified the principle of buzz pollination in Leucojum. He noticed that some flowers were nectarless, especially those that were wind-pollinated. He also observed that some flowers such as orchids attracted insects but did not have nectar, but he did not fully understand the nature of the deception. He also recognized nectar theft by certain insects.

During his lifetime, Sprengel's work was somewhat neglected by his peers, who themselves did not recognize the immanent importance of his findings re the aspects of selection and evolution; but it was also in part rejected because many of his contemporaries viewed as obscene the idea that flowers had anything to do with sexual functions. A. W. Henschel in Breslau (1820) wrote that Sprengel's idea gave the impression of a fairy tale to entertain a schoolboy. Sprengel's own Dr Heim, see above, gave the work a very favourable review, writing: the "work is a masterpiece, an original of which all of Germany can be proud". Georg Franz Hoffmann, the director of the botanical garden in Göttingen, noted that he himself had verified some of Sprengel's observations. Years later, Robert Brown introduced Sprengel's book to Charles Darwin, who lauded Sprengel and noted: "he clearly proved by innumerable observations how essential a part insects play in the fertilization of many plants. But he was in advance of his age." Darwin was impressed by Sprengel's approach; it inspired him in his own studies that led to the On the various contrivances by which British and foreign orchids are fertilised by insects, and on the good effects of intercrossing (1862), where he concluded that nature abhors perpetual self-fertilization.

== Impact and subsequent work ==
Plant pollination was studied further by Federico Delpino, who coined various terms for the modes and means by which it occurred. Important modern successors like Paul Knuth, Fritz Knoll, and Hans Kugler were inspired by Sprengel and advanced the fields of pollination ecology and floral biology. After the second World War, their work was continued by Stefan Vogel, Knut Faegri, Leendert van der Pijl, Amots Dafni, and G. Ledyard Stebbins, as well as by Herbert Baker and Irene Baker.

James Edward Smith named a genus of Epacridaceae in Sprengel's honour as Sprengelia. Kurt Sprengel, Christian Konrad's nephew who also wrote a history of medicine, was nominated to the "Regensburgische Botanische Gesellschaft".
