= Das entdeckte Geheimnis der Natur im Bau und in der Befruchtung der Blumen =

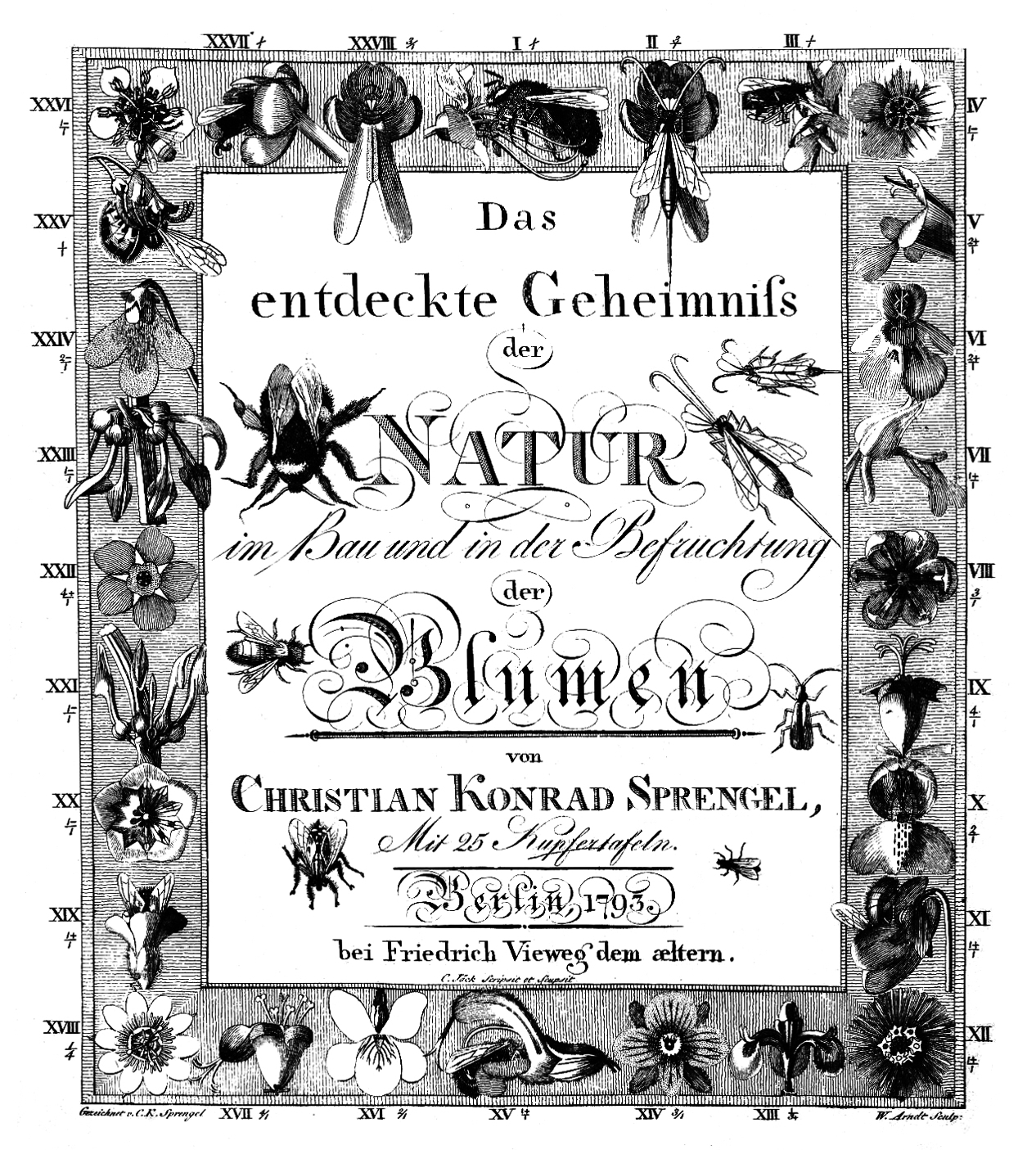
Cover

Das entdeckte Geheimnis der Natur im Bau und in der Befruchtung der Blumen (The Secret of Nature in the Form and Fertilisation of Flowers Discovered) by Christian Konrad Sprengel was published in 1793, but received little acclaim during the author's lifetime. Sprengel's ideas were rejected by other naturalists when it was published, but the importance of this work was duly appreciated by Charles Darwin some sixty years later. Darwin's use of Sprengel's ideas and reference to this book in the seminal work on the Fertilisation of Orchids established Sprengel's book as one of the most important works in the fields of floral biology and pollination ecology and its author as a founding father of these fields.

The fact that flowers have a sexual role had been recognised earlier by Linnaeus who did not investigate any functional significance of the visits of insects, but by Sprengel's time it was known that they were sometimes involved in fertilisation. These were thought to be chance visits and nectar was not thought to be intended for insects. Sprengel's book introduced a functional view, which would today be called ecology, and provided evidence that pollination was an organised process in which insects acted as "living brushes" in a symbiotic relationship for the teleological purpose of fertilising the flowers. His discovery enabled him to understand the construction and arrangement of the parts of flowers, but he was puzzled by some features such as the lack of nectar in orchids. He also investigated seed dispersal. His ideas went against prevailing dogma that flowers were generally self-fertilising and that insect visits were rare, so his proposals were thought unnecessary. His ideas were also in conflict with belief in the created harmony of nature: in disagreeing with him, Goethe described nature as behaving like an artist, not a workman. Sprengel's discoveries were ignored and largely forgotten.

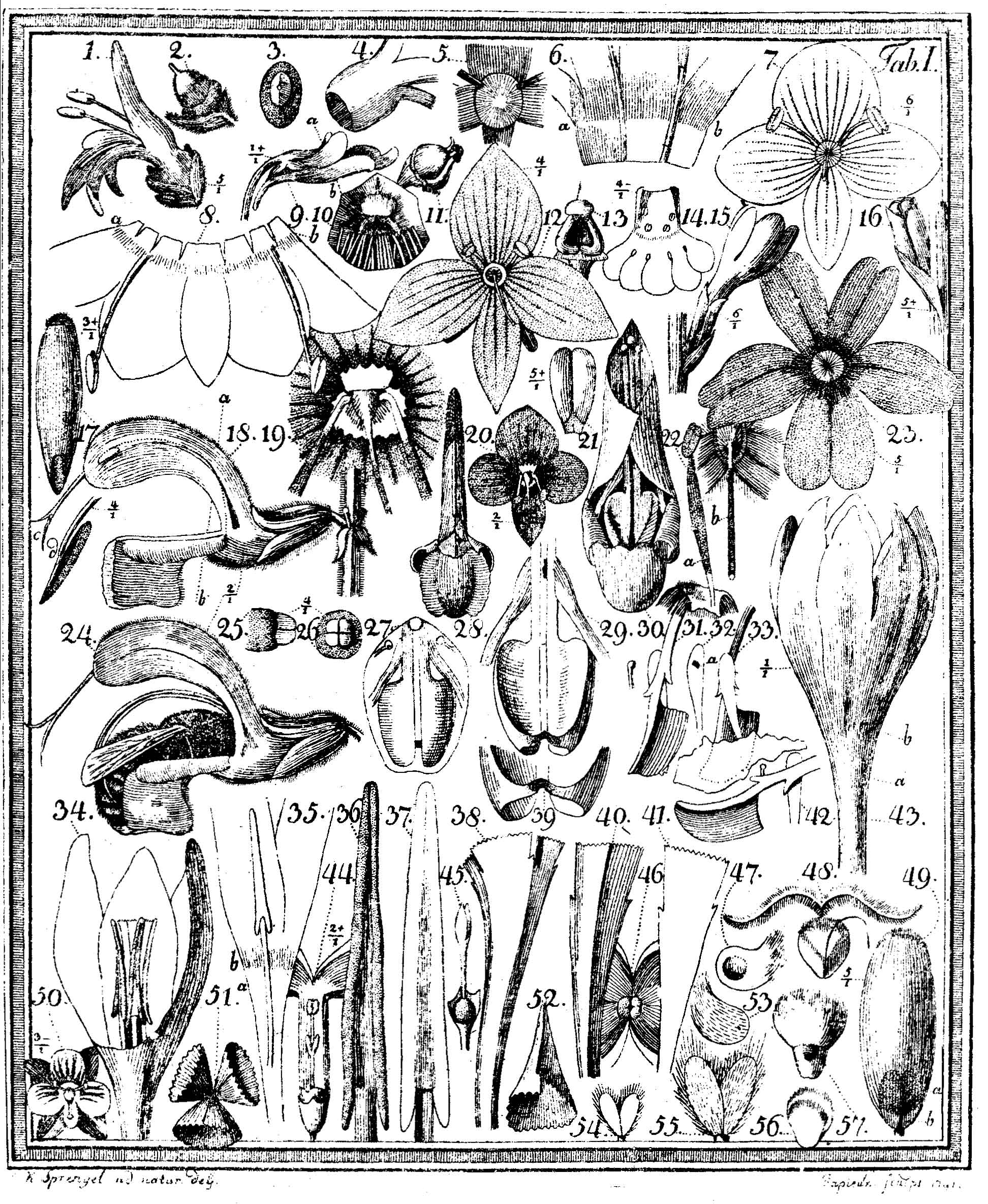
Illustration from Das entdeckte Geheimnis der Natur im Bau und der Befruchtung der Blumen

Darwin's new evolutionary ideas rejected the idea that species characters were invariable. He was aware from animal husbandry that inbreeding could lead to changes, but as wild species usually remained homogenous, he thought that species were kept the same by natural cross-fertilisation. It would also give the evolutionary advantage that favourable changes were spread through a reproductive community, but this was contradicted by the common supposition that plants were usually self-fertilising. Sprengel's work suggested answers to this problem, and Darwin adopted Sprengel's methods in investigating various plants, particularly orchids. He mentioned Sprengel in an 1841 letter to The Gardeners' Chronicle. and made reference to Sprengel's research in his unpublished 1844 Essay on the origin of species. A year later, Darwin wrote to his friend the botanist Joseph Dalton Hooker about the need for insects to pollinate flowering plants; "have you ever seen C. Sprengels curious book on this subject; I have verified many of his observations: doubtless he rides his theory very hard."
