= Floral biology =

Floral biology is an area of ecological research that studies the evolutionary factors that have moulded the structures, behaviours and physiological aspects involved in the flowering of plants. The field is broad and interdisciplinary and involves research requiring expertise from multiple disciplines that can include botany, ethology, biochemistry, and entomology. A slightly narrower area of research within floral biology is sometimes called pollination biology or anthecology.

Flowers are structures that are produced by angiosperms and their evolution is intricately associated with their pollinators, particularly insects. Flowers are costly structures that target pollinators by offering them rewards so as to enhance cross-pollination. The evolution of the size of flowers, their structure and the nature of rewards and the way these signals are transmitted and perceived by potential pollinators are typically examined in terms of the costs incurred and the benefits accrued. The timing of flowering, the duration of flowering and the mode by which they cease to function once their role is fulfilled are all areas of research within the field of floral biology.

Studies in floral biology can have applications since pollination and fruit set are key factors that affect yield in all crop plants.

== History of the field ==
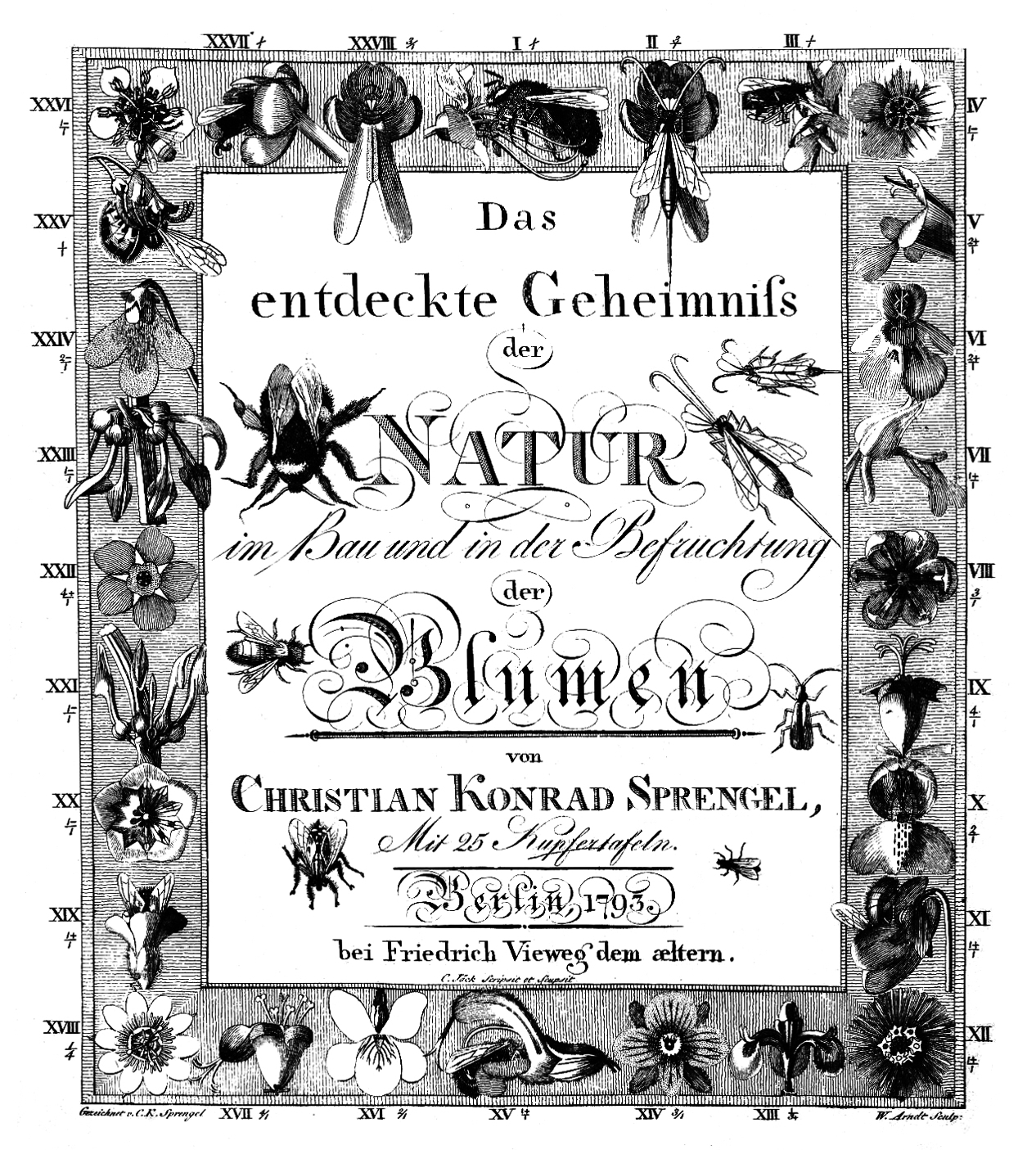
Cover of Sprengel's 1793 book

The beginnings of the field of floral biology are generally traced to Christian Konrad Sprengel's Entdeckte Geheimniss der Natur im Bau in der Befruchtung der Blumen (The Secret of Nature in the Form and Fertilization of Flowers Discovered) (1793). Sprengel may however have been influenced by the earlier work of Joseph Gottlieb Kölreuter in 1761. Sprengel began his studies in 1787 starting with the wood cranesbill Geranium sylvaticum. He noted that the lower portions of the petals had soft hairs. He believed in the wisdom of the "Creator" and that not even a single hard thing could be without purpose. He suggested that the hairs were present to protect the nectar from rain like eyebrows and eyelashes preventing sweat from flowing into the eyes. It took him six years of observation during which time he examined 461 plants. He observed that orchids lacked nectar but had nectar guides. He called these false nectar flowers and observed that the flowers of Aristolochia trapped insects. His book included twenty-five illustrations. Sprengel's work was favourably viewed by Carl Ludwig Willdenow who incorporated some of the results in his Grundriss der Kräuterkunde zu Vorlesungen (1802). Sprengel noted, contrary to popular belief of his time, that flowers were aimed at preventing self-fertilization. Sprengel identified the patterns on the petals as nectar guides ("Saftmale") for pollinators. At that time flowers were considered the place for the marriage of the stamens and pistils and nectar was thought to aid the growing seeds. Bees were thought of as thieves. Sprengel's work was criticized by Johann Wolfgang Goethe. Sprengel's work however got wider coverage in the English-speaking world only after Charles Darwin credited him in his Fertilisation of Orchids (1862).

== Aspects ==
Flowering plants, angiosperms, are relatively recent among the plants. The oldest flower structures date to about 140 million years ago. Flowering plants underwent a major diversification after this period. Darwin saw this as an "abominable mystery" in a letter to Joseph Hooker in 1879. The earliest flowers were principally actinomorphic or having radial symmetry with multiple axes of symmetry. These evolved flowers have bilateral symmetry or zygomorphy. It is thought that the attraction of insect pollinators led by visual cues had an influence in the evolution of zygomorphy.

The earliest groups of flowering plants among the Magnoliids and the families Chloranthaceae, Ceratophyllaceae, Nymphaeaceae, Annonaceae, and Aristolochiaceae are bisexual with both male and female parts present and functional within the usually large floral structure. The main pollinators of these flowers were beetles, flies, and thrips. They evolved mechanisms to reduce self-pollination by changing the timing of maturity of the male and female parts. This altered timing mechanism or dichogamy was principally expressed by protogyny or the early maturation of the female parts and only rarely by protandry or the early maturation of the male parts. The early flowers were principally flat and dish-like with the evolution of deeper corolla tubes being a later innovation and principally associated with long-tongued pollinators such as moths. There are a large number of other mechanisms that enhance cross-pollination and prevent self-pollination. The forces that led to the evolution of such systems as bearing male and female flowers on separate kinds of plants is still unclear. The evolution from solitary flowers to the production of inflorescences is also thought to be influenced by pollinator behaviour. Clusters of flowers may increase the visitation rates of pollinators. It may also reduce the risk of damage to individual flowers.

The production of volatile chemicals by flowers is targeted towards insects. Some evidence shows that there is significant overlap between the chemicals produced by plants and those used by insects for their communications, especially for mating. In the classic case of orchids in the genus Ophrys, the volatiles mimic the female sex pheromone of bees which attempt to copulate with the flower and thereby pollinate them. A study of the evolution of volatile chemicals in scarab beetles and flowers that attract them in the family Araceae showed that the insects had evolved the chemicals in the Jurassic Period while the plants evolved the attractants later in the Cretaceous Period.

The colours of flowers are another area of enquiry. Some distinct patterns have been noted, for instance bird-pollinated flowers are predominantly red while night-flowering plants tend to be white. The colours of flowers are produced by a variety of pigmentary mechanisms and they are meant to signal messages to pollinators. Flowers that have been pollinated often quickly wither and the nutrients resorbed by the plant. In some case parts of the flower may undergo colour changes to indicate their being unfit for visitation by pollinators.

== See also ==
- Anthecology
- Pollination syndrome
- Pollinator-mediated selection
- Pollination trap
- Floral scent
- Floral color change
