= Anthecology =

Study of pollination biology

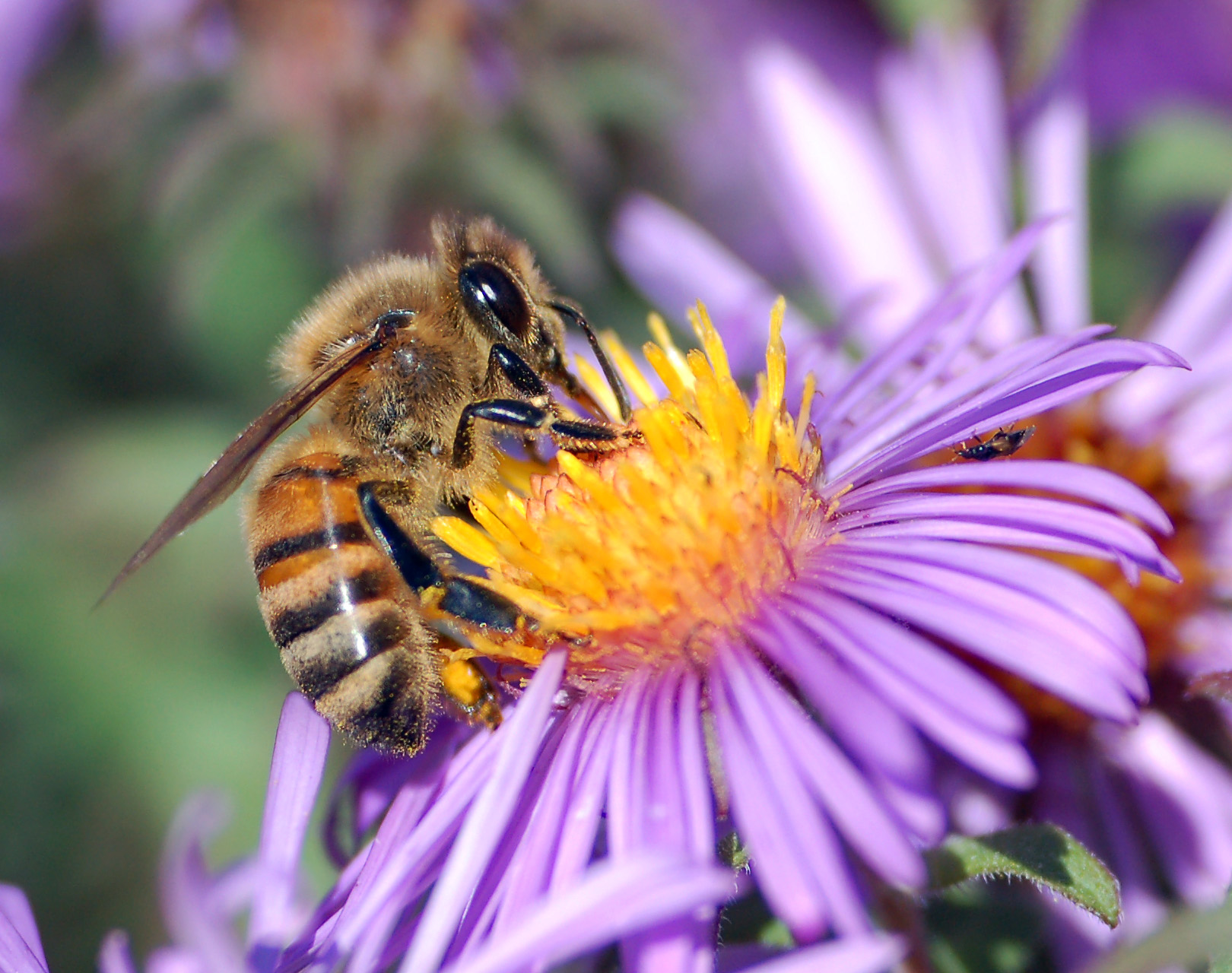
A European honey bee collects nectar, while pollen collects on its body.

Anthecology, or pollination biology, is the study of pollination as well as the relationships between flowers and their pollinators. Floral biology is a bigger field that includes these studies. Most flowering plants, or angiosperms, are pollinated by animals, and especially by insects. The major flower-frequenting insect taxa include beetles, flies, wasps, bees, ants, thrips, butterflies, and moths. Insects carry out pollination when visiting flowers to obtain nectar or pollen, to prey on other species, or when pseudo-copulating with insect-mimicking flowers such as orchids. Pollination-related interactions between plants and insects are considered mutualistic, and the relationships between plants and their pollinators have likely led to increased diversity of both angiosperms and the animals that pollinate them.

Anthecology brings together many disciplines, such as botany, horticulture, entomology, and ecology.

== History ==
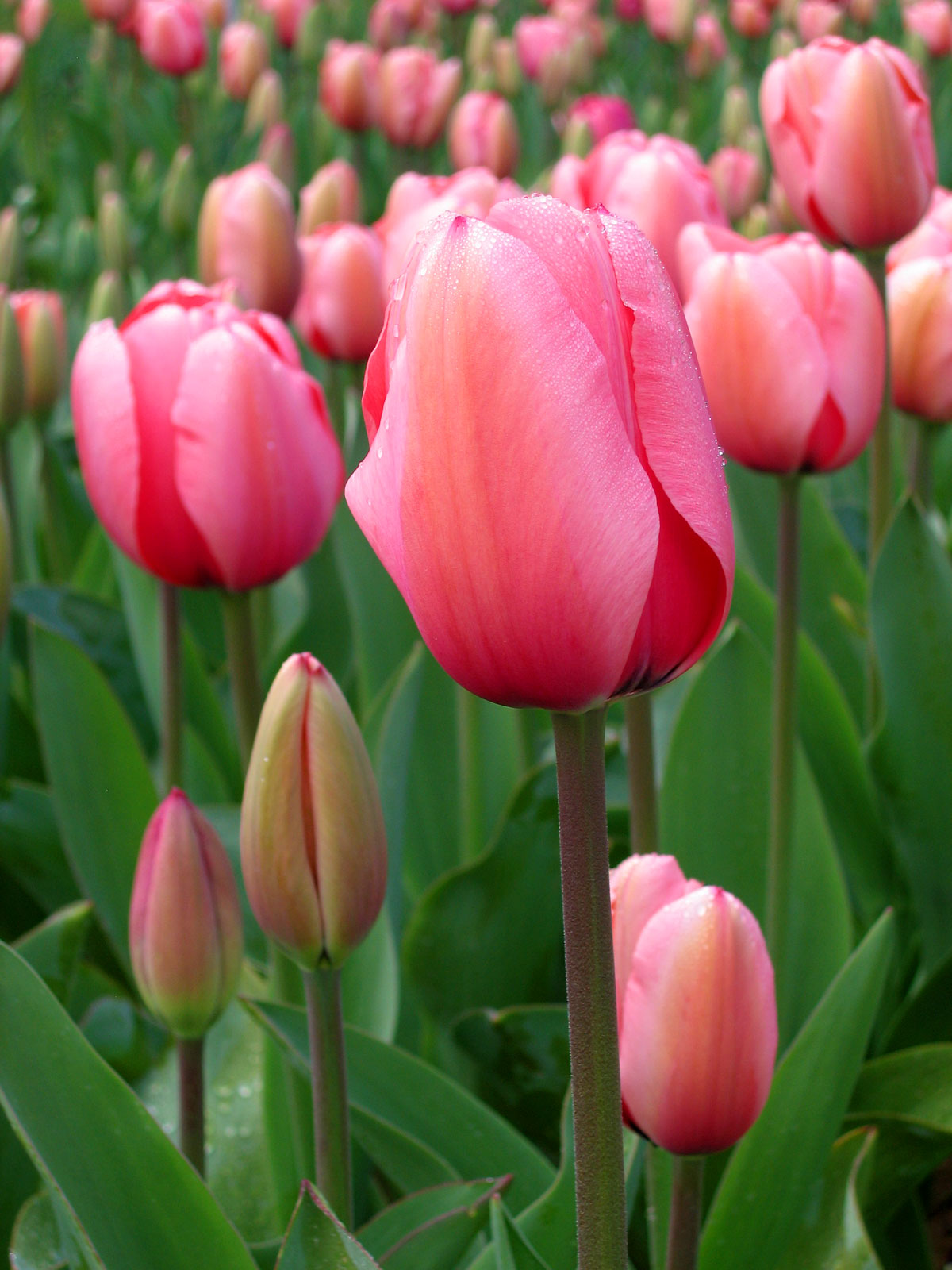
The tulip was a popular subject of study among early anthecologists.

Anthecology began as a descriptive science relying on observation, and more recently has come to rely upon quantitative and experimental studies.

By the 17th century, the sexual nature of plant reproduction was recognized following the work of Nehemiah Grew and the experiments of Rudolf Jakob Camerarius, who showed that pistillate plants need both male and female organs for reproduction. Tulips and maize were popular subjects of study during this time. In 1735, Carl Linnaeus developed a "sexual system" for the classification of seed plants. In the mid-to-late 18th century, Joseph Gottlieb Kölreuter demonstrated that pollen must be transferred from stamen to stigma for reproduction to occur, and also clarified the distinction between nectar and honey.

In the late 18th century, Christian Konrad Sprengel showed evidence that flowers attract insects and reward them with nectar. Following the emergence of the Darwinian theory of evolution in the late 19th century, scientists became keen on the selective advantage of cross-pollination. In an 1873 book, Hermann Müller made detailed observations of the particular relationships between certain insects and certain flowering plants, called pollination syndromes, and additional comprehensive surveys were made by Paul Knuth.

Anthecology went into decline for several decades, but the field was kept alive by several studies including those of honey bees by Karl von Frisch in the mid 20th century.

Anthecology gained a resurgence in the 20th century during the rise of neo-Darwinism. Specific plant-insect interactions were further documented, with an emphasis on tropical anthecology, comparative anthecology, and co-evolution.

Today, the biology of pollination has attracted the attention of scientists, governments, and the media, following observations of rapid pollinator decline in the late 20th century, including the unexplained and sudden disappearance of honey bees in a phenomenon known as colony collapse disorder.
