= Absyrtus (veterinarian) =

Ancient veterinary surgeon from Bithynia

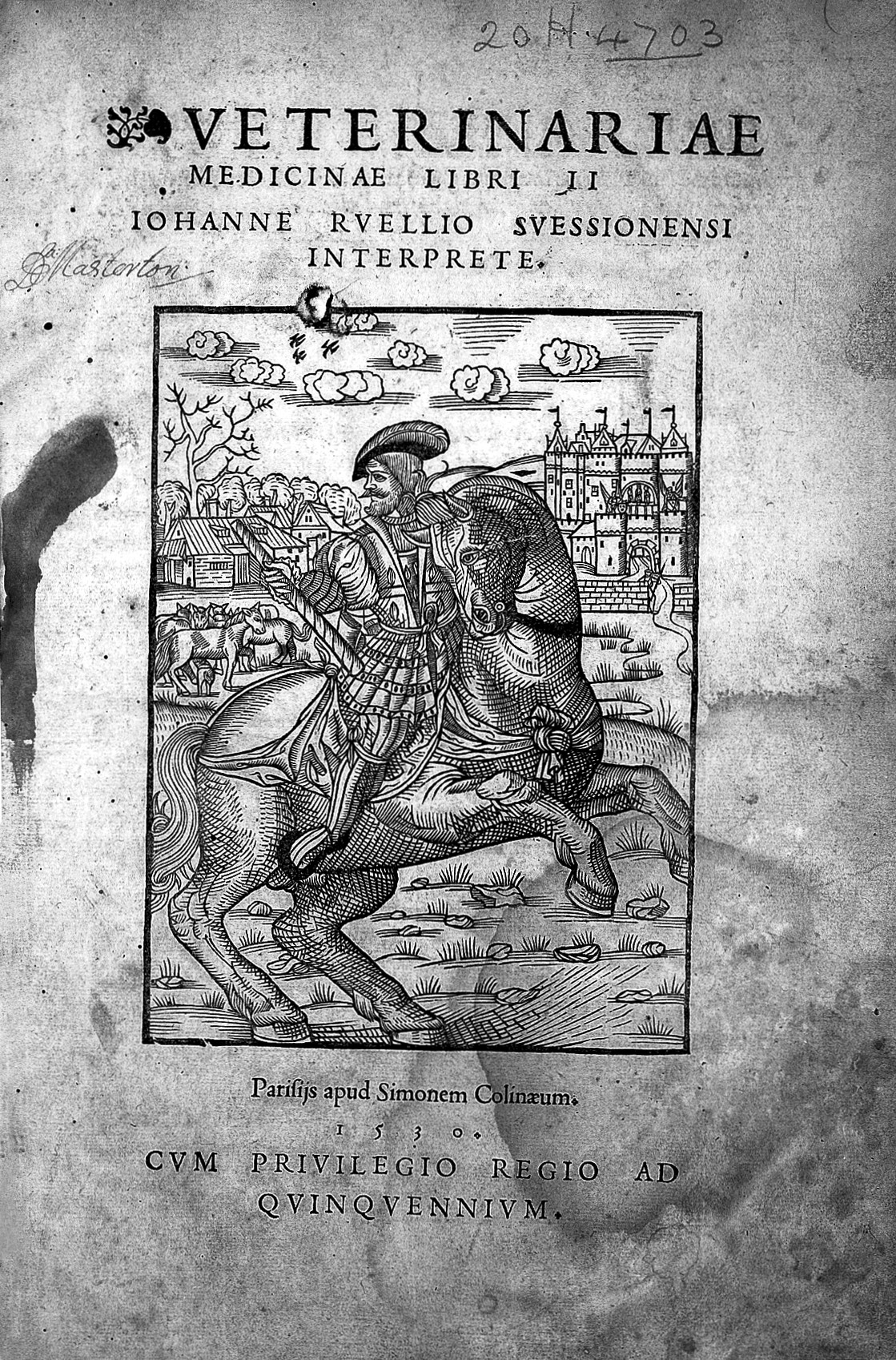
Veterinariae Medicinae, published by Jean Ruel, containing the works of Apsyrtus.

Absyrtus (Ancient Greek: Ἄψυρτος) was an Ancient Greek veterinary surgeon.

== History ==
Absyrtus was one of the principal veterinary surgeons of whom any remains are still extant. According to the Suda and Eudokia Makrembolitissa, he was born either at Prusa or Nicomedia in Bithynia (modern-day Turkey). He is said to have served under "Constantine" in his campaign on the Danube, which is generally supposed to mean Constantine the Great, in 322 CE, but some refer it to that under Constantine IV in 671 CE.

His writings are to be found in the Veterinariae Medicinae Libri Duo, first published in Latin by Jean Ruel, and afterwards in Greek by Simon Grynaeus. Christian Konrad Sprengel published a little work titled Programma de Apsyrto Bithynio.

The Suda mentions that he authored a work on horse medicine, a treatise on the physical characteristics of horses, and other works.
