= Fertilisation of Orchids =

1862 book by Charles Darwin

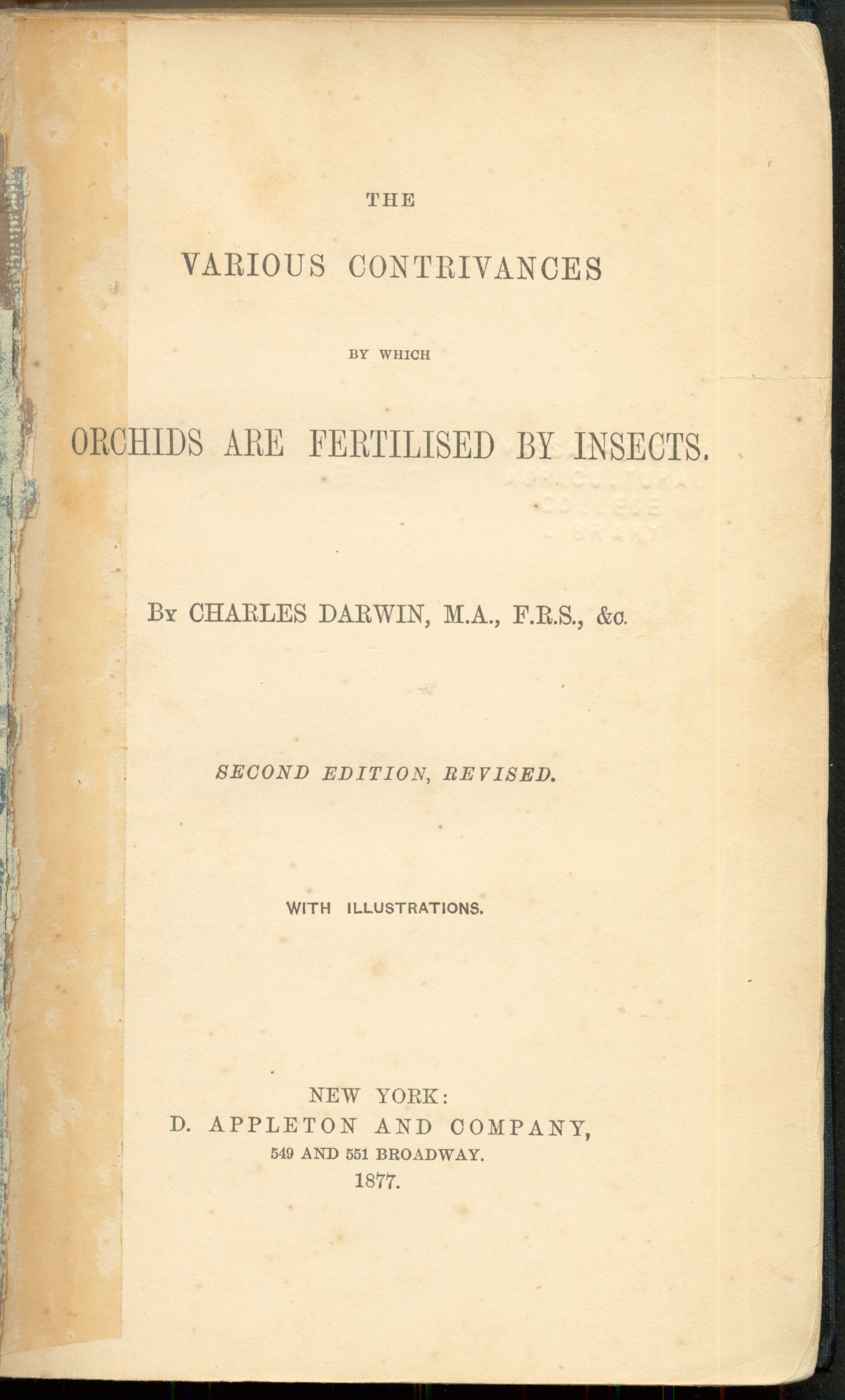
- The title page of the 1877 edition of Fertilisation of Orchids
- Author: Charles Darwin
- Language: English
- Subject: Natural selection Botany
- Published: 15 May 1862 (John Murray)
- Publisher: John Murray
- Publication place: United Kingdom
- Media type: Print (hardback)
- Pages: vi + 365
- OCLC: 1250711

Fertilisation of Orchids is a book by English naturalist Charles Darwin published on 15 May 1862 under the full explanatory title On the Various Contrivances by Which British and Foreign Orchids Are Fertilised by Insects, and On the Good Effects of Intercrossing. Darwin's previous book, On the Origin of Species, had briefly mentioned evolutionary interactions between insects and the plants they fertilised, and this new idea was explored in detail. Field studies and practical scientific investigations that were initially a recreation for Darwin—a relief from the drudgery of writing—developed into enjoyable and challenging experiments. Aided in his work by his family, friends, and a wide circle of correspondents across Britain and worldwide, Darwin tapped into the contemporary vogue for growing exotic orchids.

The book was his first detailed demonstration of the power of natural selection, and explained how complex ecological relationships resulted in the coevolution of orchids and insects. The view has been expressed that the book led directly or indirectly to all modern work on coevolution and the evolution of extreme specialisation. It influenced botanists, and revived interest in the neglected idea that insects played a part in pollinating flowers. It opened up the new study areas of pollination research and reproductive ecology, directly related to Darwin's ideas on evolution, and supported his view that natural selection led to a variety of forms through the important benefits achieved by cross-fertilisation. Although the general public showed less interest and sales of the book were low, it established Darwin as a leading botanist. Orchids was the first in a series of books on his innovative investigations into plants.

The book describes how the relationship between insects and plants resulted in the beautiful and complex forms which natural theology attributed to a grand designer. By showing how practical adaptations develop from cumulative minor variations of parts of the flowers to suit new purposes, Darwin countered the prevailing view that beautiful organisms were the handiwork of a Creator. Darwin's painstaking observations, experiments, and detailed dissection of the flowers explained previously unknown features such as the puzzle of Catasetum, which had been thought to have three completely different species of flowers on the same plant. In addition, they produced testable predictions including his then-controversial proposal that the long nectary of Angraecum sesquipedale meant that there must be a moth with an equally long proboscis. This was confirmed in 1903 when Xanthopan morganii praedicta was found in Madagascar.

== Background ==
Charles Darwin grew up with an interest in natural history, and as a student at the University of Cambridge he became a pupil and close friend of botany professor John Stevens Henslow. The year he graduated, Darwin was given a supernumerary position as a gentleman naturalist and geologist on the second voyage of HMS Beagle, a trip that lasted five years. By the time he returned in October 1836, he had doubts about the doctrine that species were fixed and unchanging. Within months, experts informed him that specimens he had collected were separate species, not just varieties, and the patterns he saw inspired the inception of his theory of natural selection in 1838. Darwin began editing and publishing the expert reports, collected in the Zoology of the Voyage of H.M.S. Beagle, at the same time as writing a series of books on geology, the first of which was The Structure and Distribution of Coral Reefs. His "species work" was his "prime hobby", a background to this writing, but it evolved into an extensive research programme during the twenty years before he published his theory.

=== Insect fertilisation of plants ===
Darwin's speculations on the origin of species convinced him that cross-fertilisation played an important role in keeping specific forms consistent. He rejected the doctrine that the characteristics of a species were static, and was aware from animal husbandry that inbreeding could lead to changes, often deleterious. He thought that natural outbreeding through cross-fertilisation would keep wild species homogenous yet vigorous. Cross-fertilisation would confer an evolutionary advantage by spreading favourable changes throughout a reproductive community. His ideas were contrary to the common supposition that plants were usually self-fertilising, and so every summer Darwin investigated the contribution of insect pollination to the cross-pollination of flowers.

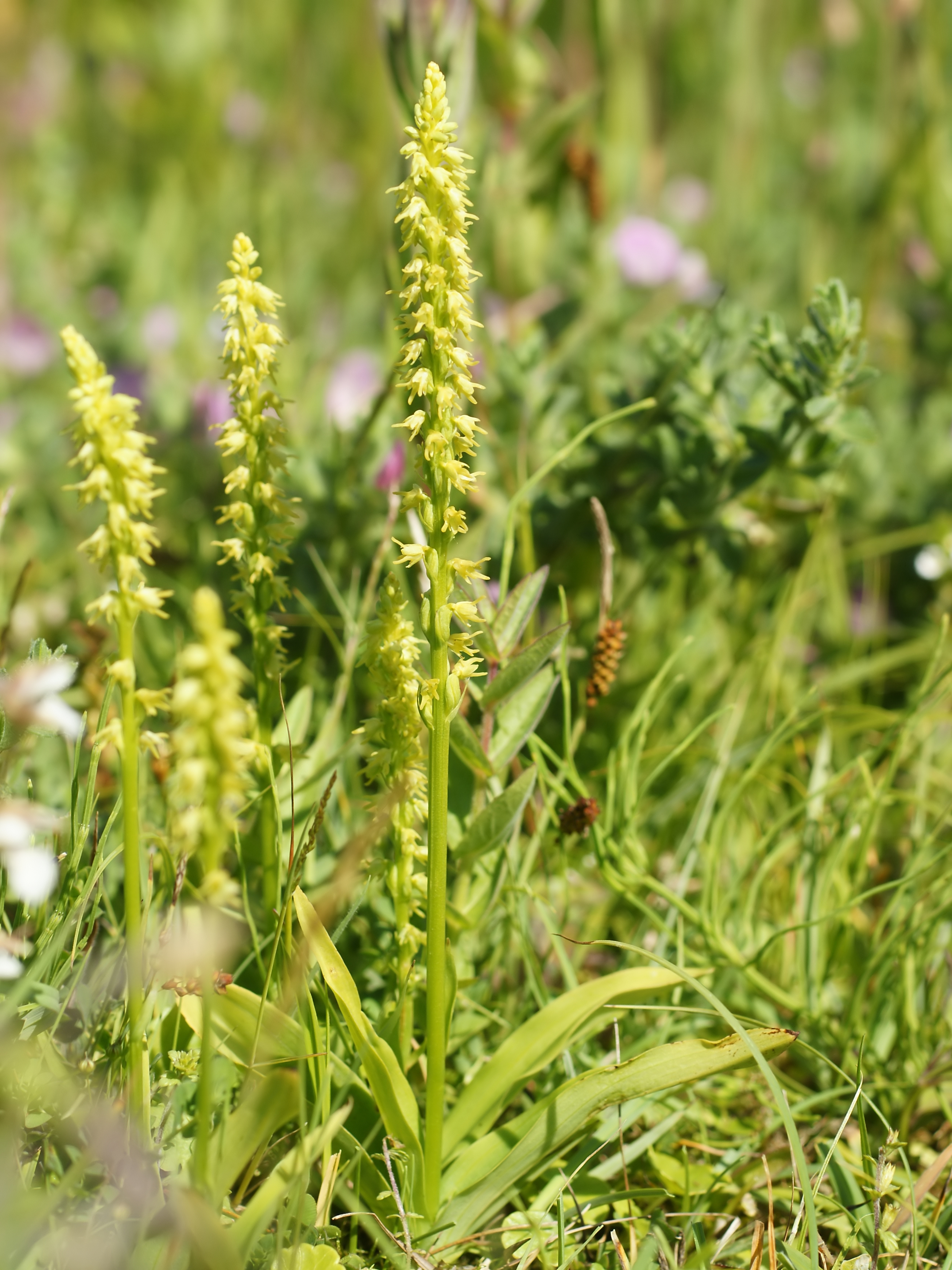
Musk orchids (Herminium monorchis) in grassland

In the summer of 1841 Charles and Emma Darwin moved from the turmoil of London to the countryside, to Down House, a quiet former parsonage in the village of Downe. He wrote, "The flowers are here very beautiful". Darwin followed the recommendation of his friend, the leading botanist Robert Brown, and read Das entdeckte Geheimnis der Natur im Bau und in der Befruchtung der Blumen (The Secret of Nature in the Form and Fertilisation of Flowers Discovered). The little known book, published in 1793 by Christian Konrad Sprengel but never translated into English, introduced the idea that flowers were created by God to fulfill a teleological purpose: insects would act as "living brushes" to cross-fertilise plants in a symbiotic relationship. This functional view was rejected and mostly forgotten, as it contradicted the common belief that flowers had been created for beauty, and were generally self-fertilising. For Darwin, the concept of evolution gave new meaning to Sprengel's research into the mechanisms for cross-fertilisation. He welcomed its support for his supposition that cross-fertilisation in flowering plants tended to allow their offspring to avoid possible disadvantages resulting from self-fertilisation, and by 1845 he had verified many of Sprengel's observations.

A favourite walk took the Darwin family to a spot above the quiet Cudham valley, teeming with orchids including Cephalanthera, Neottia, fly orchids and musk orchids. They called this place "Orchis Bank", and the whole family became involved in Darwin's researches. Darwin observed orchids every summer, but in twenty years, only on two occasions (when he noticed butterflies "sucking O. pyramidalis and Gymnadenia") did he see insects visiting flowers. In 1854, Darwin began to work full-time on the origin of species. He examined orchids and counted how often one or both pollinia (pollen masses) had been removed from their flowers, indicating that they had been visited by insects. He experimented with insect pollination to investigate whether, by cross-fertilising field crops such as Fabaceae, they would yield more vigorous offspring, and published letters about his inconclusive results in The Gardeners' Chronicle in 1857 and 1858. He next applied Sprengel's methods to empirical research on orchids. Despite delays caused by recurring illness, he made progress on writing his planned "Big Book" on evolution, but when Alfred Russel Wallace's letter prompted joint publication of both of their theories of natural selection in 1858, Darwin quickly wrote On the Origin of Species as an abstract of his theory, published on 22 November 1859. In this book, he gave credence to Sprengel's ideas on the advantages of "intercrossing", and noted: "Many of our orchidaceous plants absolutely require the visits of moths to remove their pollen masses and thus to fertilise them". He introduced his new concept, the process of coevolution, describing the co-adaptation of bumblebees and red clover, and speculating "how a flower and a bee might slowly become, either simultaneously or one after the other, modified and adapted in the most perfect manner to each other, by the continued preservation of individuals presenting mutual and slightly favourable deviations of structure". This was a theme he developed in his orchid book.

== Botany as recreation ==
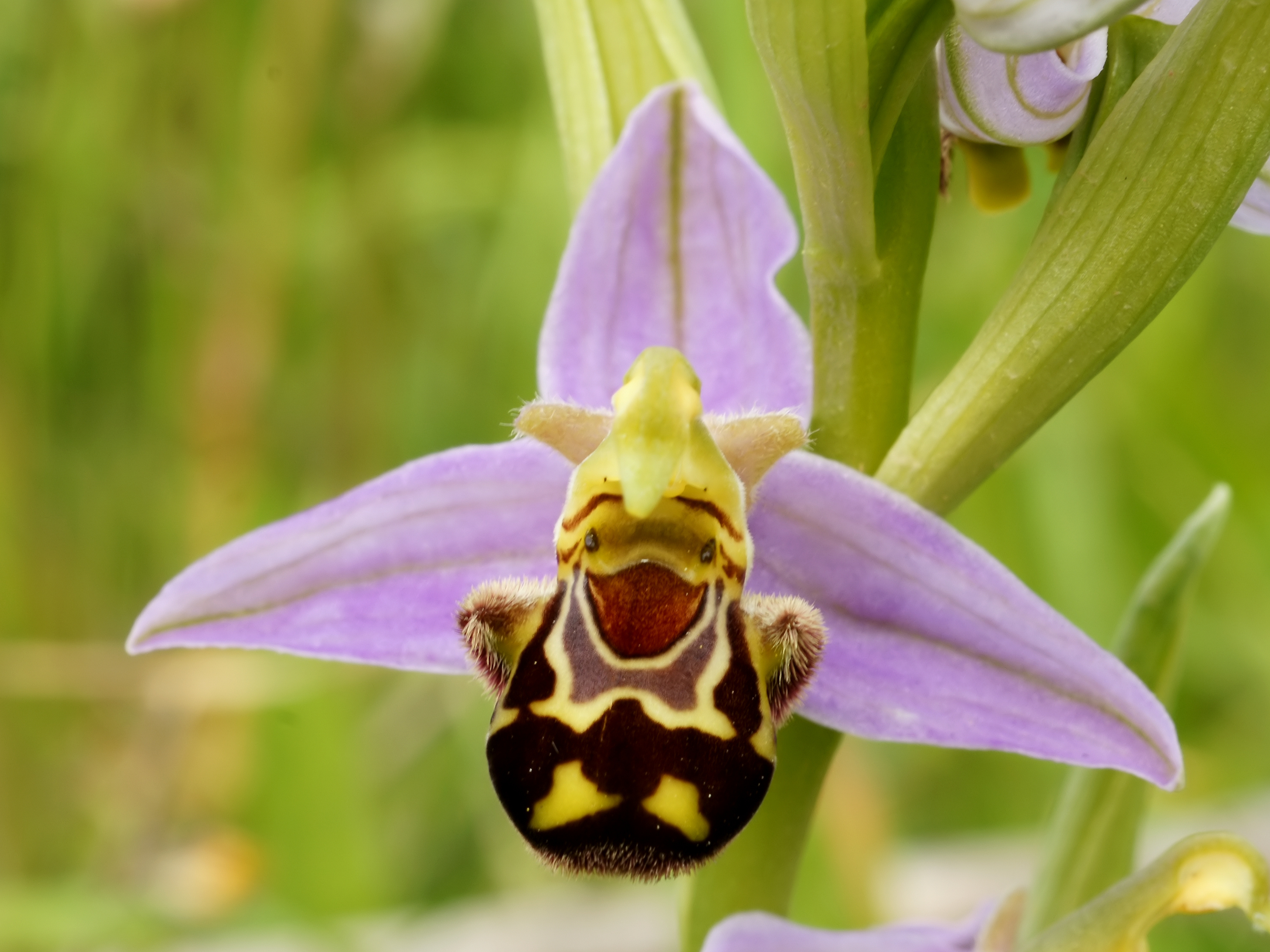
The bee orchid does not have nectar, but its labellum, imitating a female bee, attracts male bees. Darwin found that in northern Europe, it is mostly self-fertilising.

After On the Origin of Species was published, Darwin became involved in producing revised editions as well as working on Variation of Animals and Plants Under Domestication as the first part of his planned "Big Book". By the spring of 1860 he had tired of the grind of writing, and needed something fresh and interesting to study. During a family visit to relatives at Hartfield, he was searching for orchids when he noticed a sundew. He collected it and tried to feed it insects, thus beginning a long-term study of insectivorous plants. He investigated other botanical questions raised by his ideas of natural selection, including the advantages of sexual dimorphism in primulas, and the adaptive mechanisms that ensure cross-pollination in orchids. As an enthusiastic practical scientist, such investigations gave him a strong sense of personal enjoyment. He relished pitting his wits against nature, and following lucky hunches. His theory was a way of looking at the world, enabling him to find creative solutions to problems that traditional approaches could not solve. He later wrote, "I am like a gambler, & love a wild experiment."

Around the end of April 1860, Darwin discussed insect pollination with his friend Joseph Dalton Hooker, and mentioned the bee orchid. Darwin corresponded with Hooker's assistant Daniel Oliver, the senior curator at Kew Gardens, who became a follower of Darwin's ideas. At the start of June, Darwin wrote to The Gardeners' Chronicle asking for readers' observations on how bee or fly orchids were fertilised. His letter described the mechanisms for insect fertilisation he had discovered in common British orchids, and reported his experimental observations that pollen masses were removed from Orchis morio and Orchis mascula plants in the open, but left in their pouches in adjacent plants under a glass bell jar. He wrote to American botanist Asa Gray that he had been "so struck with admiration at the contrivances, that I have sent notice to Gardeners Chronicle", and made similar enquiries of other experts.

Darwin became engrossed in meticulous microscopic examination, tracing the complicated mechanisms of flowers that attracted insects by their nectar so that the insects transported pollen to cross-pollinate other plants, and on 19 July he told Hooker, "I am intensely interested on subject, just as at a game of chess." In September, he "dissected with the greatest interest" and wrote, "The contrivances for insect fertilisation in Orchids are multiform & truly wonderful & beautiful." By October, he had "a large mass of notes with many new facts", but set them aside "convinced that I ought to work on Variation & not amuse myself with interludes".

=== Research and draft ===
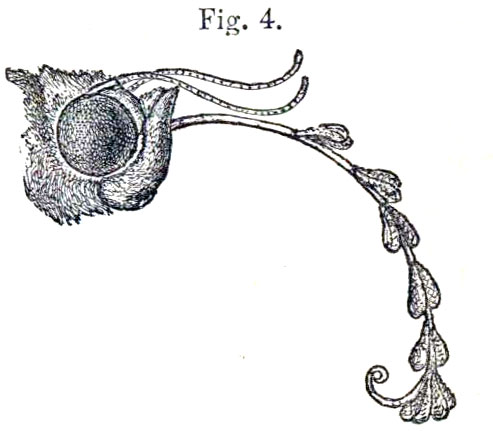
Head of a moth with its proboscis laden with seven pairs of pollinia from Orchis pyramidalis

During 1861, botany became a preoccupation for Darwin, and his projects became serious scientific pursuits. He continued his study of orchids throughout the summer, writing to anyone who might be able to supply specimens he had not yet examined. Field naturalists, botanists, and country gentry sent specimens from across the British Isles. Darwin also tramped around the countryside with tin cans and biscuit boxes, collecting specimens which his gardeners potted up for him. His family joined in, and neighbours contributed to the research. As he had only a cold greenhouse, a friend on the other side of the village who had a hot-house allowed him to use that, and offered the services of his gardener to look after the delicate specimens. Darwin's aim was to show how the complex structures and life cycles of the plants could be explained by natural selection rather than by the handiwork of God; he saw the huge variety of flowers as a collection of ad hoc evolutionary adaptations. In June he described his examination of bee orchids as a passion, and his findings on insect fertilisation of orchids as "beautiful facts".

There were several replies to Darwin's enquiry in The Gardeners' Chronicle seeking evidence to support his idea that pollen masses attached themselves to a convenient place on an insect's back or head, usually its proboscis, to transport the pollen to another flower. One envelope appeared to be empty when it arrived at Down House, but when he looked further before discarding it he found several insect mouthparts with pollen masses attached. To help their daughter Henrietta convalesce from illness, the Darwins arranged to spend two months in Torquay. Darwin wrote:

I have, owing to many interruptions, not been going on much with my regular work (though I have done the very heavy jobs of variation of Pigeons, Fowls, Ducks, Rabbits Dogs &c) but have been amusing myself with miscellaneous work.—I have been very lucky & have now examined almost every British Orchid fresh, & when at sea-side shall draw up rather long paper on the means of their fertilisation for Linn. Socy & I cannot fancy anything more perfect than the many curious contrivances.

He sought advice on obtaining the exotic South American Catasetum, to see it eject pollen masses, as "I am got intensely interested on subject & think I understand pretty well all the British species." They went to Torquay on 1 July, and Darwin began writing his orchid paper. By 10 August, he feared his paper would run "to 100 M.S. folio pages!!! The beauty of the adaptations of parts seems to me unparalleled ... I marvel often as I think over the diversity & perfection of the contrivances."

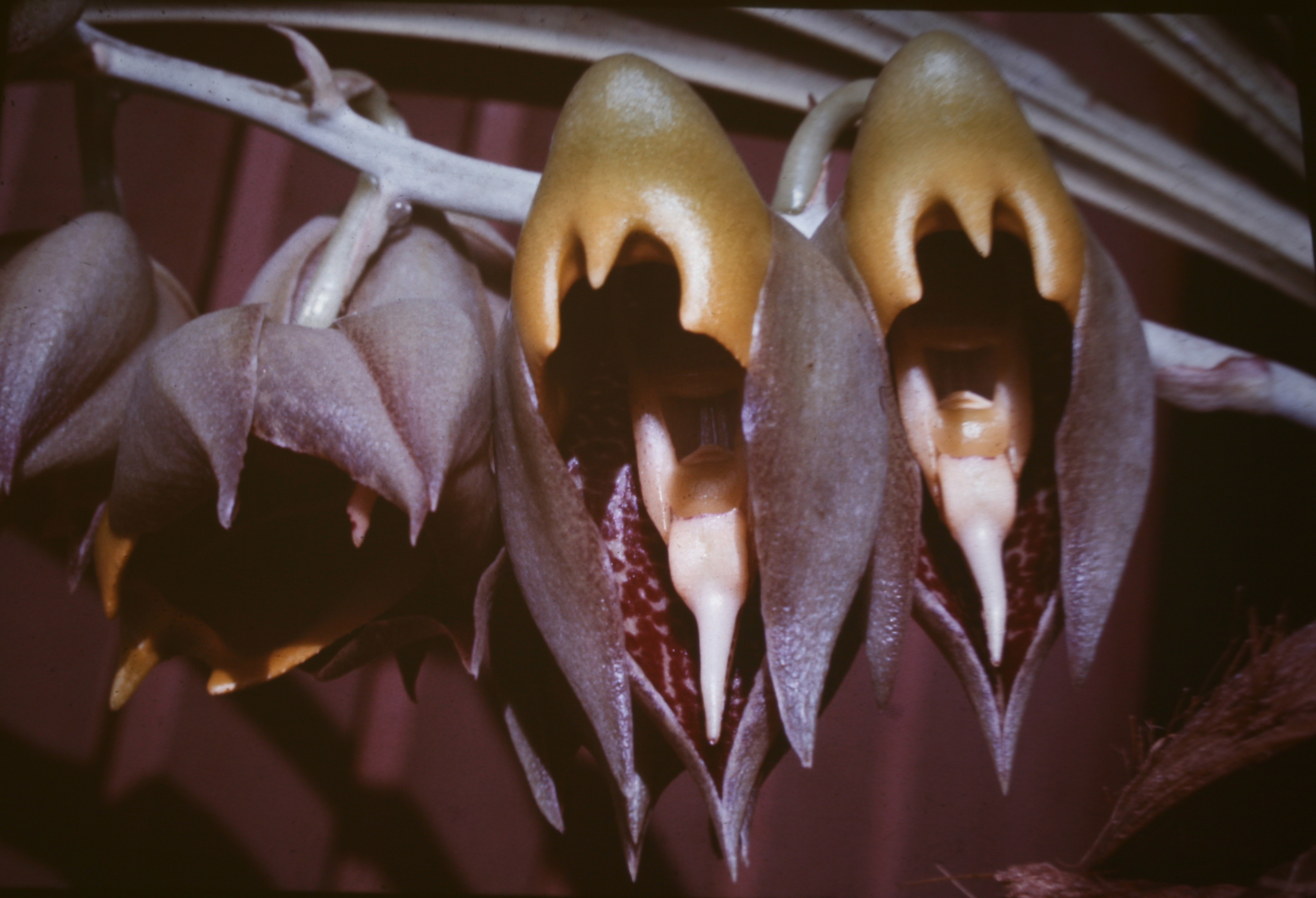
Catasetum macrocarpum from Suriname ejects its pollen masses at insects.

The family returned to Downe on 27 August, and Darwin again wrote to the Gardeners' Chronicle appealing for assistance as he was "very anxious to examine a few exotic forms". His requests to the wealthy enthusiasts who had taken up the fashionable pursuit of growing rare orchids brought large numbers of specimens. These would be a test of his theory: previously aspects such as coloration of plants and animals had often been regarded as having no adaptive function. For example, Thomas Henry Huxley was strongly influenced by German idealism and in 1856 had asked if it was "to be supposed for a moment that the beauty of colour and outline ... are any good to the animals? ... Who has ever dreamed of finding an utilitarian purpose in the forms and colours of flowers ... ?" Darwin had, and in the orchids he tackled the most difficult case. His ideas would transform the way naturalists thought about coloration.

The completed Orchis paper came to 140 folio pages, and Darwin decided against presenting it at the Linnean Society of London, thinking of publishing a pamphlet instead. He offered the draft to John Murray who agreed to publish it as a book. Although Darwin feared a lack of public interest, he hoped it would serve to "illustrate how Natural History may be worked under the belief of the modification of Species". In discussions with Asa Gray about natural theology, he wrote that "it really seems to me incredibly monstrous to look at an orchid as created as we now see it. Every part reveals modification on modification."

As a popular and acceptable activity, botany had been taken up by many middle class ladies, and Darwin included these botany enthusiasts in his correspondence. On the recommendation of John Lindley, Darwin wrote to Lady Dorothy Nevill, who responded generously by sending numerous exotic orchids, and requested a signed photograph of him to hang in her sitting room next to portraits of her other notable friends, including Hooker.

=== Linnean Society paper ===
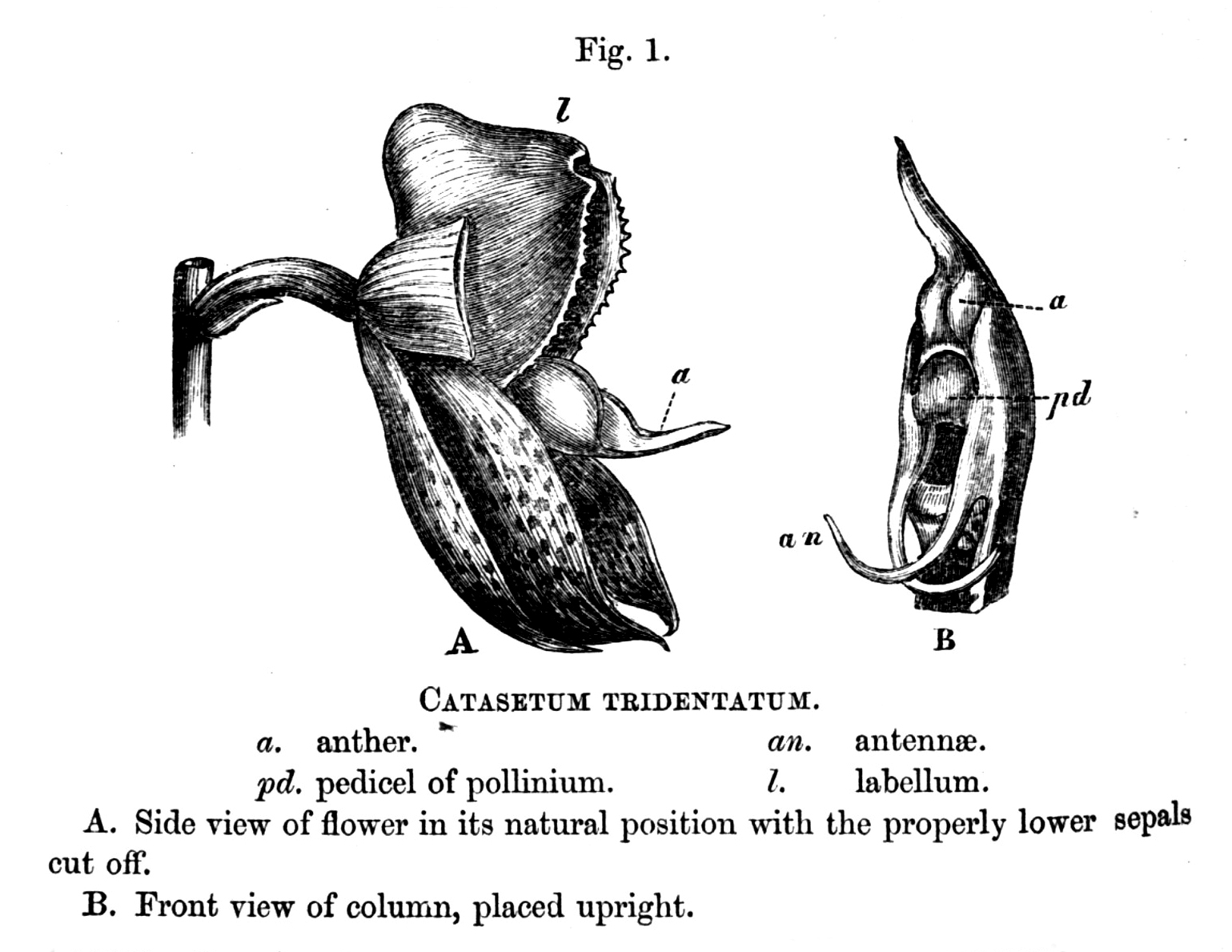
Illustration from Darwin's Linnean Society paper on Catasetum pollination

The orchid book was delayed because of illness, but Darwin continued to "look at it as a hobby-horse, which has given me great pleasure to ride". He was particularly astounded by the long spur of the Angraecum sesquipedale flowers, one of the orchids sent by the distinguished horticulturist James Bateman, and wrote to Hooker "Good Heavens what insect can suck it[?]"

By November, a specimen of the exotic South American Catasetum orchid Hooker had given to Darwin had shown its "truly marvellous" mechanism, by which it shot out a pollinium at any insect touching a part of the flower "with sticky gland always foremost". This plant had astonished botanists in 1836 when Robert Hermann Schomburgk stated that he had seen one plant growing three distinct flowers which usually grew separately and had wrongly been categorised as three distinct genera, namely Catasetum tridentatum, Monachanthus viridis, and Myanthus barbatus. John Lindley had remarked that "such cases shake to the foundation all our ideas of the stability of genera and species." One of Darwin's correspondents told of delight at growing a beautiful specimen of Myanthus barbatus imported from Demerara, then dismay when the plant flowered the next year as a simple Catasetum.

In view of this interest, Darwin prepared a paper on Catasetum as an extract from his forthcoming book, which was read to the Linnean Society of London on 3 April 1862. Darwin solved the puzzle by showing that the three flowers were the male, female, and hermaphrodite forms of a single species, but as they differed so much from each other, they had been classified as different genera.

=== Publication ===
Darwin sent the incomplete manuscript to his publisher John Murray on 9 February 1862, while he was still working on the last chapter. Although anxious that the book might not sell, he could "say with confidence that the M.S. contains many new & very curious facts & conclusions". When the book was printed, he sent out presentation copies to all the individuals and societies who had helped him with his investigations, and to eminent botanists in Britain and abroad for review.

On 15 May 1862 the book was published under the full title of On the Various Contrivances by Which British and Foreign Orchids Are Fertilised by Insects, and On the Good Effects of Intercrossing. In August, Darwin was "well contented with the sale of 768 copies; I shd. hope & expect that the remainder will ultimately be sold", but the book sold slowly and less than 2,000 copies of the first edition were printed. An expanded edition translated into French was published in Paris in 1870, and in 1877 Murray brought out a revised and expanded second edition, with the shortened title The Various Contrivances by Which Orchids Are Fertilised by Insects. This was also published by D. Appleton & Company of New York in 1877, and a German translation was published in the same year. Despite being well praised by botanists, only about 6,000 copies of the English editions had been sold by 1900.

== Content ==
Darwin set out a detailed study of common descent with modifications by expanding on the theme of coevolution between local populations of insects and flowering plants that he had briefly discussed in On the Origin of Species. He examined numerous ways in which orchids vary, showing how they had diverged and developed specialised pollen-dispersal mechanisms. The intricate morphology and anatomy of each flower was carefully described. Apparently trivial details were examined in relation to natural selection to demonstrate how slight variations in similar structures of closely related flowers led to specialised modifications that provided various pollinators (insects) with different ways to cross-fertilise. The mass of descriptive detail was a great achievement, but the result is demanding to read.

In the introduction, Darwin explained his aim of meeting complaints that detailed support for his theory was lacking in On the Origin of Species. He chose orchids for his subject as "amongst the most singular and most modified forms in the vegetable kingdom" in the hope of inspiring work on other species, and felt that "the study of organic beings may be as interesting to an observer who is fully convinced that the structure of each is due to secondary laws, as to one who views every trifling detail of structure as the result of the direct interposition of the Creator." He gave due credit to previous authors who had described the agency of insects in fertilising orchids, and all who had helped him.

=== British orchids ===
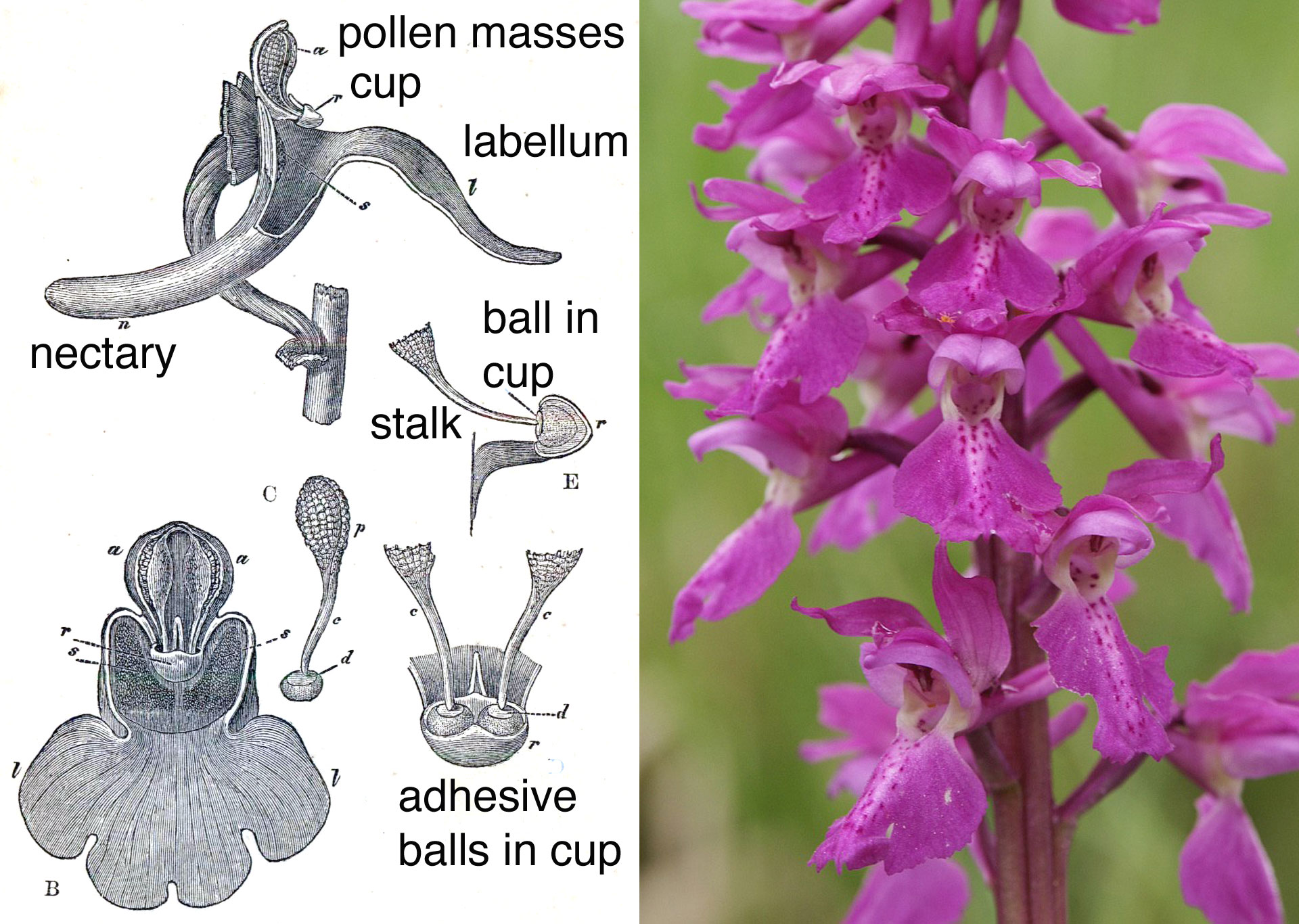
The pollination mechanism of Orchis mascula is given as an example of a mechanism for transferring pollen to insects: the diagram from the book shows all the petals cut away except the lowest petal, the labellum, which extends back to form a tubular nectary below the column.

In the first chapter Darwin described the British orchids he had studied, giving detailed explanations of their various mechanisms for transferring pollen to insects. The first mechanism described is that of Orchis mascula, which serves as an introduction to the explanation of other Orchidaceae. In the upper part of the flower a petal shelters the male organ which has two packages of pollen grains, held together by thin elastic threads. These pollen masses stand side by side and have stalks down to adhesive balls in a cup which keeps them moist and sticky. When an insect lands on the large projecting lower petal, the labellum, and pushes its head and proboscis into the centre of the flower and down to the nectary, it breaks the cup and the adhesive balls attach the pollen masses to the front of the insect. As the insect flies off, each stalk rotates the pollen mass downwards and forwards so that when the insect lands on another flower the pollen masses attached to the insect pass under the male organ and leave pollen on the female organ, achieving cross fertilisation. Darwin envisaged:

A poet might imagine, that whilst the pollinia are borne from flower to flower through the air, adhering to a moth's body, they voluntarily and eagerly place themselves, in each case, in that exact position in which alone they can hope to gain their wish and perpetuate their race.

This is followed by descriptions of the differences in the mechanisms of several other orchids. In Orchis pyramidalis, the adhesive balls are combined into a strap or saddle shape, which curls round the thin proboscis of a moth or butterfly to attach to it the pair of pollen masses, illustrated in the book by figure 4 showing a moth's head with seven pairs of pollen masses attached to its proboscis.

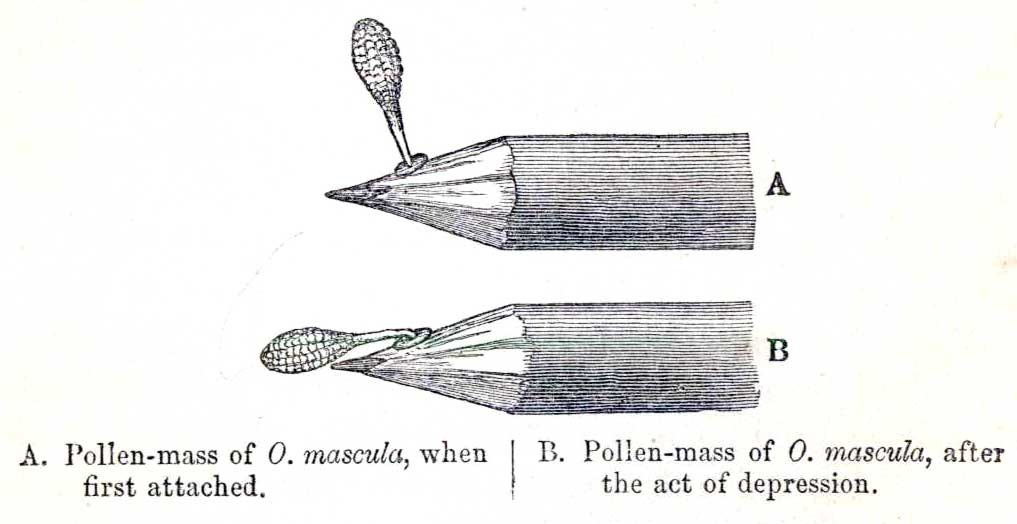
When an Orchis mascula pollen mass attaches itself to a probe, its stalk slowly rotates downwards.

While the bee orchid showed adaptation for self-fertilisation, its mechanism also enabled occasional cross-fertilisation, creating the biological diversity that Darwin felt was needed for vigorous survival, which could not be provided by self-fertilisation. As an example of "how beautifully everything is contrived", Darwin described how he had found that in Spiranthes flowers the pollen is ready for collection before access is open for the female organ to receive pollen. At Torquay he had watched bees visiting spires of these flowers, starting at the bottom of the spire and working their way up to the topmost flowers. He speculated that if bees moved from top to top of the spires, the pollen clusters they collected from the most recently opened flowers would be wasted as the topmost flowers on the next spike would not be ready to receive pollen. A bee starting at the lowest flowers on the first spire it visited would continue up until it reached flowers that still had their pollen masses to attach to the bee, then would fly to the mature lower flowers on another plant, and fertilise them. By this co-ordinated process, the bee would add "to her store of honey" while perpetuating the flowers "which will yield honey to future generations of bees".

=== Exotic orchids ===
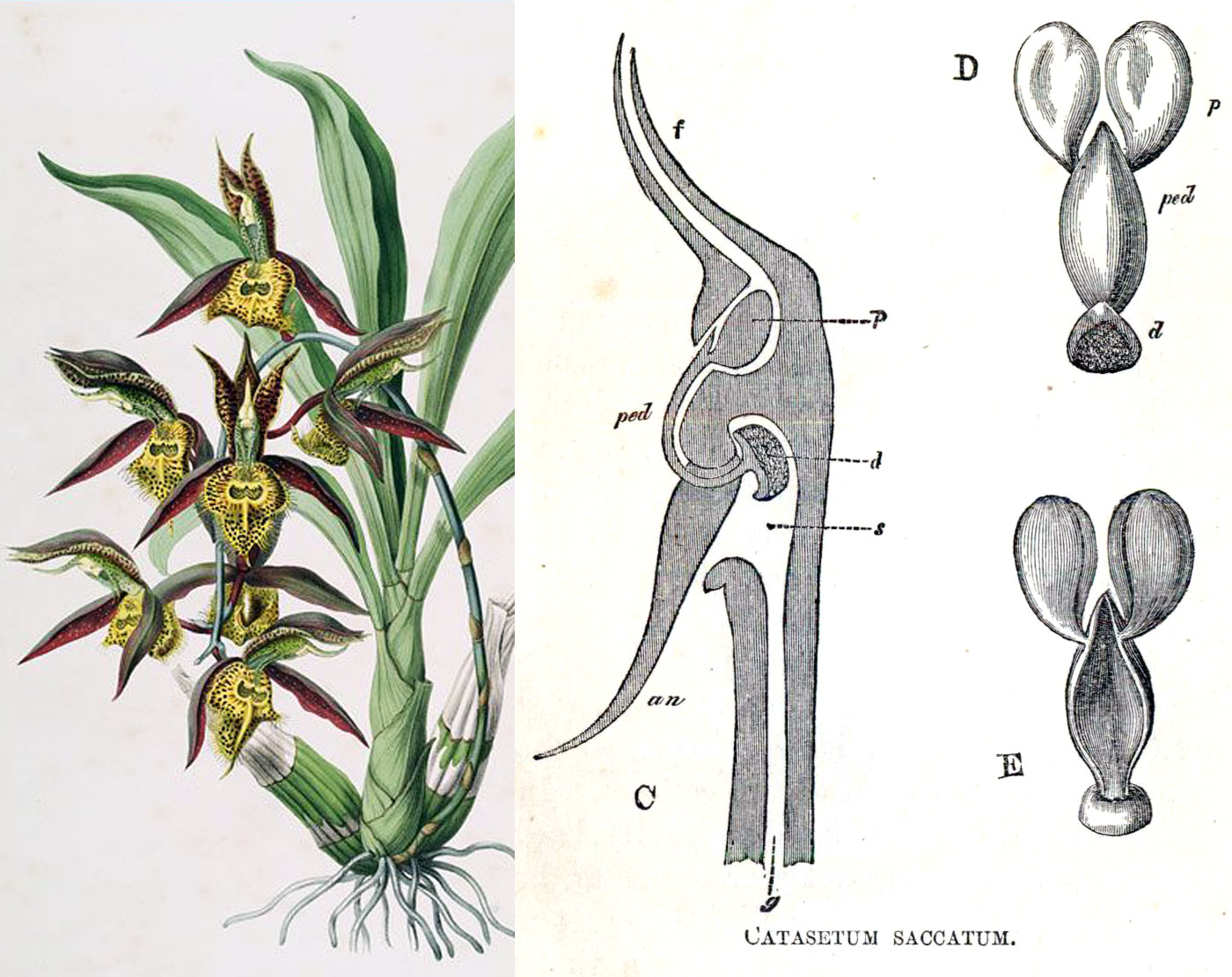
The mechanism by which Catasetum saccatum ejects its pollen is explained by a sectional illustration, shown here to the right of an earlier print showing the plant.

The book moves on to the various foreign orchids Darwin had received from others. His experiments showed that the "astonishing length" of the 11 1/2 inch (290 mm) long nectary hanging from Angraecum sesquipedale flowers implied the need for an as yet unknown moth with a proboscis 10–11 inches (250–280 millimetres) long to pollinate these flowers in Madagascar. He viewed this as the outcome of a coevolutionary race, writing that "there has been a race in gaining length between the nectary of the Angræcum and the proboscis of certain moths". This wastefulness is familiar in modern terms as the idea of an evolutionary arms race, but was disturbing to biologists of the time who believed that adaptations were the outcome of benevolent divine purpose.

Darwin described "the most remarkable of all Orchids", Catasetum, and showed how in these flowers, "as throughout nature, pre-existing structures and capacities [had been] utilised for new purposes". He explained the mechanism in which the pollen masses of the pollinium were connected by a bent stalk or pedicel to a sticky disc kept moist at the back of the flower. When an insect touched an "antenna" projecting from the back of the flower, this released the bent pedicel which sprang straight and fired the pollinium, sticky disc first, at the insect. In experiments, Darwin had imitated this action using a whalebone spring. He vividly illustrated how the flower ejected the pollinium with considerable force: "I touched the antennæ of C. callosum whilst holding the flower at about a yard's distance from the window, and the pollinium hit the pane of glass, and adhered to the smooth vertical surface by its adhesive disc."

=== Final chapter ===
Darwin noted that the essential nectar, secreted to attract insects, seemed also in some cases to act as an excretion: "It is in perfect accordance with the scheme of nature, as worked out by natural selection, that matter excreted to free the system from superfluous or injuring substances should be utilised for purposes of the highest importance." Homologies of the flowers of orchids showed them all to be based on "fifteen groups of vessels, arranged three within three, in alternating order". He disparaged the idea that this was an "ideal type" fixed by the Omnipotent Creator, but attributed it instead to its "descent from some monocotyledonous plant, which, like so many other plants of the same division, possessed fifteen organs, arranged alternately three within three in five whorls; and that the now wonderfully changed structure of the flower is due to a long course of slow modification,—each modification having been preserved which was useful to each plant, during the incessant changes to which the organic and the inorganic world has been exposed".

Describing the final end state of the whole flower cycle as the production of seed, he set out a simple experiment in which he took a ripe seed capsule and arranged the seeds in a line, then counted the seeds in one-tenth of an inch (2.5 mm). By multiplication he found that each plant produced enough seeds to plant 1-acre (4,000 m^{2}) of ground, and the great-grandchildren of a single plant could "carpet the entire surface of the land throughout the globe" if unchecked.

In conclusion, he felt that the book had "shown that Orchids exhibit an almost endless diversity of beautiful adaptations. When this or that part has been spoken of as contrived for some special purpose, it must not be supposed that it was originally always formed for this sole purpose. The regular course of events seems to be, that a part which originally served for one purpose, by slow changes becomes adapted for widely different purposes." He was almost exasperated by the inventiveness of forms in nature; "In my examination of Orchids, hardly any fact has so much struck me as the endless diversity of structure,—the prodigality of resources,—for gaining the very same end, namely, the fertilisation of one flower by the pollen of another." His focus on detail was justified, as "The use of each trifling detail of structure is far from a barren search to those who believe in natural selection." The "contrivances and beautiful adaptations" slowly acquired through slight variations, subjected to natural selection "under the complex and ever-varying conditions of life", far transcended the most fertile imagination. The mechanisms to transport the pollen of one flower or of one plant to another flower or plant underlined the importance of cross-fertilisation: "For may we not further infer as probable, in accordance with the belief of the vast majority of the breeders of our domestic productions, that marriage between near relatives is likewise in some way injurious,—that some unknown great good is derived from the union of individuals which have been kept distinct for many generations?"

== Reception ==
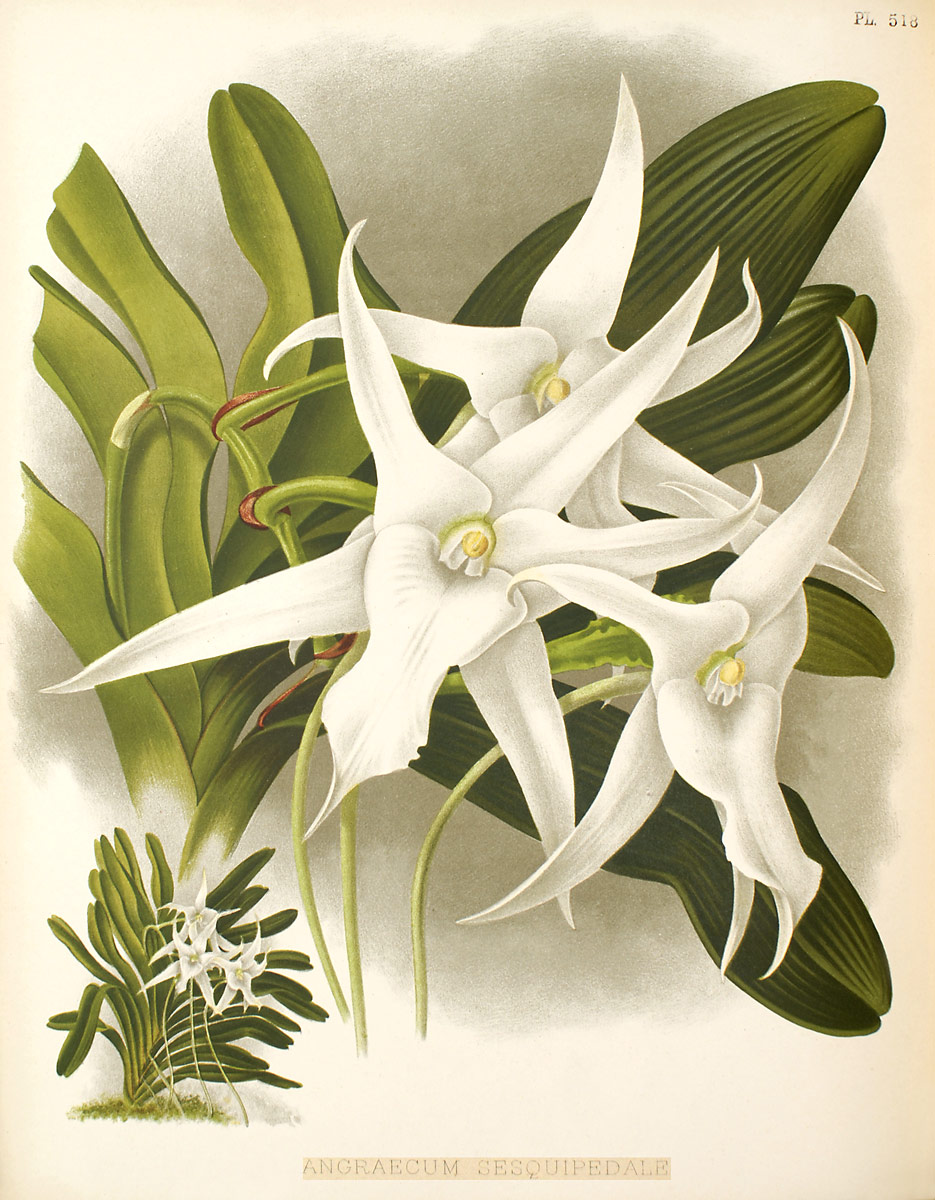
The nectary of Angraecum sesquipedale flowers is in a thin green spur about 12 inches (300 mm) long.

Botanists responded favourably to the book immediately on its publication. Hooker told Darwin that the book showed him to be "out of sight the best Physiological observer & experimenter that Botany ever saw", and was glad to note that two leading traditional botanists had accepted the concept of evolution; "Bentham & Oliver are quite struck up in a heap with your book & delighted beyond expression". Daniel Oliver thought it "very extraordinary", and even Darwin's old beetle-hunting rival Charles Babington, by then professor of botany at the University of Cambridge and inclined to oppose natural selection, called it "exceedingly interesting and valuable ... highly satisfactory in all respects. The results are most curious and the skill shown in discovering them equally so." George Bentham praised its value in opening "a new field for observing the wonderful provisions of Nature ... a new and unexpected track to guide us in the explanation of phenomena which had before that appeared so irreconcilable with the ordinary prevision and method shown in the organised world."

The book's success in botanical circles was enhanced following Bentham's public endorsement. In his presidential address to the Linnean Society on 24 May 1862, Bentham praised the book as exemplifying the biological method, and said that it had nearly overcome his opposition to the Origin. In his address in 1863 he stated that "Mr Darwin has shown how changes may take place", and described it as "an unimpeachable example of a legitimate hypothesis" in compliance with John Stuart Mill's scientific method. This endorsement favourably influenced Miles Joseph Berkeley, Charles Victor Naudin, Alphonse Pyramus de Candolle, Jean Louis Quatrefages, and Charles Daubeny.

In June 1862, Darwin welcomed favourable reviews in the press and wrote to Hooker; "Well my orchis-book is a success (but I do not know whether it sells) after cursing my folly in writing it". He told his publisher, "The Botanists praise my Orchid-book to the skies", and to Asa Gray he said, "I am fairly astonished at the success of my book with botanists." Darwin's geologist friend Charles Lyell gave it enthusiastic praise: "next to the Origin, as the most valuable of all Darwin's works." However, the book attracted little attention from the general public, and in September Darwin told his cousin Fox, "Hardly any one not a botanist, except yourself, as far as I know, has cared for it." The book baffled a general public more interested in controversy over gorillas and cavemen. There were some reviews in gardening magazines, but few natural philosophers or zoologists noticed the book, and hardly any learned appraisals appeared.

=== Theological responses ===
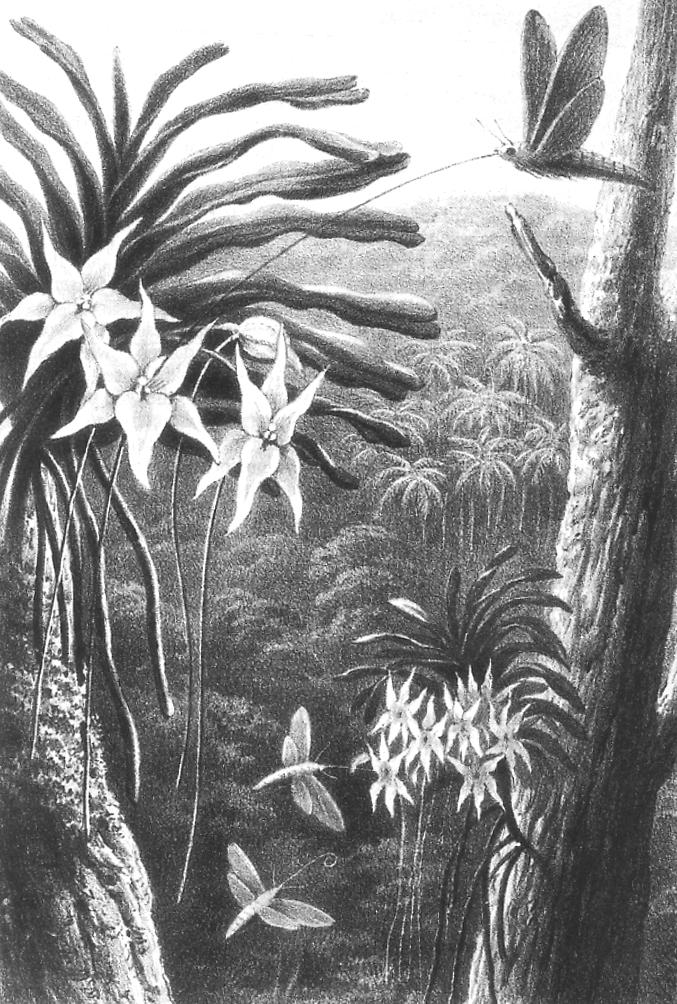
In 1867, zoological artist Thomas William Wood drew a speculative illustration of a then unknown moth pollinating Angraecum sesquipedale, based on Alfred Russel Wallace's descriptions.

Although the book contradicted the prevailing natural theology and its teleological approach to design in nature, the Saturday Review thought that it would avoid the angry polemics aroused by On the Origin of Species. The Literary Churchman welcomed "Mr. Darwin's expression of admiration at the contrivances in orchids", only complaining that it was too indirect a way of saying "O Lord, how manifold are Thy works!" (Psalm 104:24) Darwin regarded these theological views as irritating misunderstandings, but wrote to Asa Gray describing his approach as a "flank movement on the enemy". By showing that the "wonderful contrivances" of the orchid have discoverable evolutionary histories, Darwin was countering claims by natural theologians that the organisms were examples of the perfect work of the Creator.

There was considerable controversy surrounding Darwin's prediction that a moth would be found in Madagascar with a long proboscis matching the nectary of Angraecum sesquipedale. An anonymous article in the Edinburgh Review of October 1862 by George Campbell, 8th Duke of Argyll, argued that Darwin's wording implied purpose, and concluded that "We know, too, that these purposes and ideas are not our own, but the ideas and purposes of Another." He considered Darwin's explanations the "most unsatisfactory conjectures", and raised obscure metaphysical objections while supporting a kind of creative evolutionism. Emma Darwin thought that although Argyll was "quite opposed" to Darwin's views, "he praises the Orchids in such an enthusiastic way that he will do it a good turn". Darwin was delighted to find that a well written article "smashing" Argyll's review was by one of Darwin's own nephews.

Argyll went on in his 1867 book The Reign of Law to cleverly ridicule Darwin's ideas, particularly the prediction of a moth in Madagascar with a proboscis 10–11 inches (250–280 millimetres) long. He believed that adaptations showed divine purpose, not a mindless evolutionary arms race. In his response Creation by Law later that year, Alfred Russel Wallace produced a detailed explanation of how the nectary could have evolved through natural selection, and stated that he had carefully measured moths in the British Museum, finding that the proboscis of Macrosila cluentius from South America was 9 1/4 inches (230 mm) long, and the proboscis of Macrosila morganii from tropical Africa (since renamed Xanthopan morganii) was 7 1/2 inches (190 mm) long. An enquiry raised in 1873 was answered by Darwin's friend Hermann Müller, who stated that his brother Fritz Müller had caught a sphinx moth in Brazil with a proboscis nearly 10 inches (250 mm) long. Darwin's anticipation was fully met in 1903, when a subspecies of Xanthopan morganii was found in Madagascar with a proboscis about 12 inches (300 mm) long, and was named Xanthopan morganii praedicta to celebrate this verification of a testable prediction made by Darwin on the basis of his theory of natural selection.

== Influence ==
Michael Ghiselin has expressed the view that all studies of coevolution follow directly or indirectly from Darwin's orchid book, which was also the origin of all work on the evolution of extreme specialisation. Its publication led almost immediately to research by many other naturalists into specialisation and coevolution, in some cases analysing other taxa. In his autobiography, Darwin modestly recalled how this work had revived interest in Christian Konrad Sprengel's neglected ideas:

For some years before 1862 I had specially attended to the fertilisation of our British orchids; and it seemed to me the best plan to prepare as complete a treatise on this group of plants as well as I could, rather than to utilise the great mass of matter which I had slowly collected with respect to other plants. My resolve proved a wise one; for since the appearance of my book, a surprising number of papers and separate works on the fertilisation of all kinds of flowers have appeared; and these are far better done than I could possibly have effected. The merits of poor old Sprengel, so long overlooked, are now fully recognised many years after his death.

Among the many prominent biologists who began research on coevolution, Hermann Müller was particularly interested in the evolutionary sequence in which insects and flowers became adapted to each other. Like Darwin, he began with the premise that flowers were adapted to ensure cross-fertilisation, and added his own premise that most insects were not "limited by hereditary instinct to particular flowers". On this basis, he developed the view that specialisation develops from the need for flowers to attract pollinating insects (without making access too easy for non-pollinators), and from the evolution of pollinators to adapt to changes in the location of rewards such as nectar. He found that alpine flowers tended to be visited by bees at lower altitudes, and by butterflies at higher altitudes, beginning research on the idea that plants at different altitudes were specialised for different pollinators. By comparing related plant species that he thought had diverged in form from a common ancestor, and testing whether they were visited by butterflies or bees, he was the first to use a combination of morphological and ecological approaches to understand patterns in the evolution of interactions and specialisation. His brother Fritz Müller used similar methods when studying mimicry in Brazil. The early development of ideas on specialisation and coevolution became increasingly focused on the problem of mimicry; Henry Walter Bates had initially raised this issue in a paper read to the Linnean Society of London in December 1861 in Darwin's presence, and published in November 1862.

Others basing their studies of reproductive ecology on Darwin's evolutionary approach included Friedrich Hildebrand and Severin Axell in Europe, Asa Gray and Charles Robertson in North America. In Italy, Federigo Delpino adopted the theory of descent but like Sprengel had a teleological approach and explained the mechanisms of flowers by the intervention of a "psychovitalistic intelligence". Delpino classified flowers on the basis of the pollinators they attracted, and coined many of the terms still in use such as pollination syndrome and ornithophily. There was an enormous increase in knowledge during this period. In 1874, Asa Gray paid tribute to Darwin's work on orchids for explaining "all these and other extraordinary structures, as well as of the arrangement of blossoms in general, and even the very meaning and need of sexual propagation". He credited Darwin with establishing the understanding that "Nature abhors close fertilization".

By the end of the 19th century, there were so many uncritical and unproven speculations about floral mechanisms that floral ecology became discredited. In the 1920s, it was revived with further developments in detailed analyses of insects' senses, led by researchers Frederic Clements, Karl von Frisch and others. Their experiments resulted in new information, including the discovery that some insects have ultraviolet vision, and findings involving bee learning and communication. Modern floral ecology has been reinvigorated by its relevance for evolutionary studies.

== Further research by Darwin ==
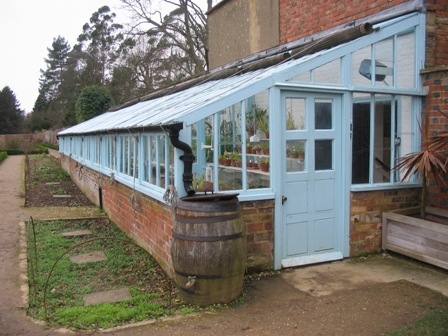
Darwin's greenhouse at Down House was extended to provide hothouses where he spent an hour or so every morning and afternoon, examining plants and planning future experiments.

Darwin had "found the study of orchids eminently useful in showing me how nearly all parts of the flower are coadapted for fertilisation by insects, & therefore the result of n. selection,—even most trifling details of structure". His own interest in orchids and in fertilisation of plants by insects continued. Darwin had been given the use of a hot-house at The Rookery on the other side of the village, and at the end of 1862 he was persuaded by this neighbour's helpful gardener to have his own built at Down House as an extension to the existing cold lean-to greenhouse. The gardener drew up plans, and Darwin investigated stoves and ventilation devices. When it was completed in February 1863 he asked Hooker for some plants from Kew Gardens, writing "I long to stock it, just like a school-boy", and sent his butler with a cart. When over 160 different plants were delivered, Darwin made apologetic remarks about depleting the national collection. He told Hooker "You cannot imagine what pleasure your plants give me ... Henrietta & I go & gloat over them." Darwin's life was changed by having a warm hothouse to spend time in before his walk round the Sandwalk, and in the 1870s he had several more hothouses built. The children later remembered this routine and the gardeners attending to Darwin's experimental plants, as well as the way that Darwin used simple equipment for his experiments, dissecting and measuring plants and seeds.

A chance observation "thoroughly aroused" Darwin's attention to a surprising decrease in vigour of the offspring of Linaria vulgaris following only one instance of self-fertilisation, and after eleven years of experimental work he published The Effects of Cross and Self Fertilisation in the Vegetable Kingdom in 1876 as "a complement to the 'Fertilisation of Orchids,' because it shows how important are the results of cross-fertilisation which are ensured by the mechanisms described in that book." He told a friend "I cannot endure doing nothing", and resumed his work on orchids, assisted in his research by his son Francis Darwin. He corresponded about orchids with Fritz Müller, and almost completely rewrote the book with a considerable amount of new material, much of which was contributed by Müller. The revised edition was published in 1877.

Francis Darwin described it as characteristic that his father delighted in the observations that preceded the publication of Fertilisation of Orchids, not the applause which followed it. He quoted one of his father's last letters about orchids, written in 1880:

They are wonderful creatures, these Orchids, and I sometimes think with a glow of pleasure, when I remember making out some little point in their method of fertilisation.

== Commemoration of Darwin's work on orchids ==
Kent Wildlife Trust manages Downe Bank, which is near Down House and was a favourite place of the Darwin family, who called it 'Orchis Bank' because of the many wild orchids which grew there. It is now part of the 'Downe Bank and High Elms' Site of Special Scientific Interest. Darwin's observations of local orchids and their insect pollinators gave him the evidence for co-evolution which provided the basis for the Fertilisation of Orchids." Experts have identified "Orchis Bank" as the species-rich setting encapsulated in the closing paragraph of On the Origin of Species, in which Darwin wrote:

It is interesting to contemplate an entangled bank, clothed with many plants of many kinds, with birds singing on the bushes, with various insects flitting about, and with worms crawling through the damp earth, and to reflect that these elaborately constructed forms, so different from each other, and dependent on each other in so complex a manner, have all been produced by laws acting around us.

Darwin's home and its surroundings, including specifically "Orchis Bank", have been called his landscape laboratory, and together were nominated in January 2009 for designation as a World Heritage Site. The bid was made by a partnership led by the London Borough of Bromley, which now includes Downe. It was included in the 39 proposed properties, but was not in the 21 new sites selected for the list.

The influence of Darwin's work was commemorated in the Smithsonian Institution's 15th Annual Orchid Show, Orchids Through Darwin's Eyes, 24 January to 26 April 2009.

== See also ==
- Pollination of orchids
