= Joseph Gottlieb Kölreuter =

German botanist (1733 - 1806)

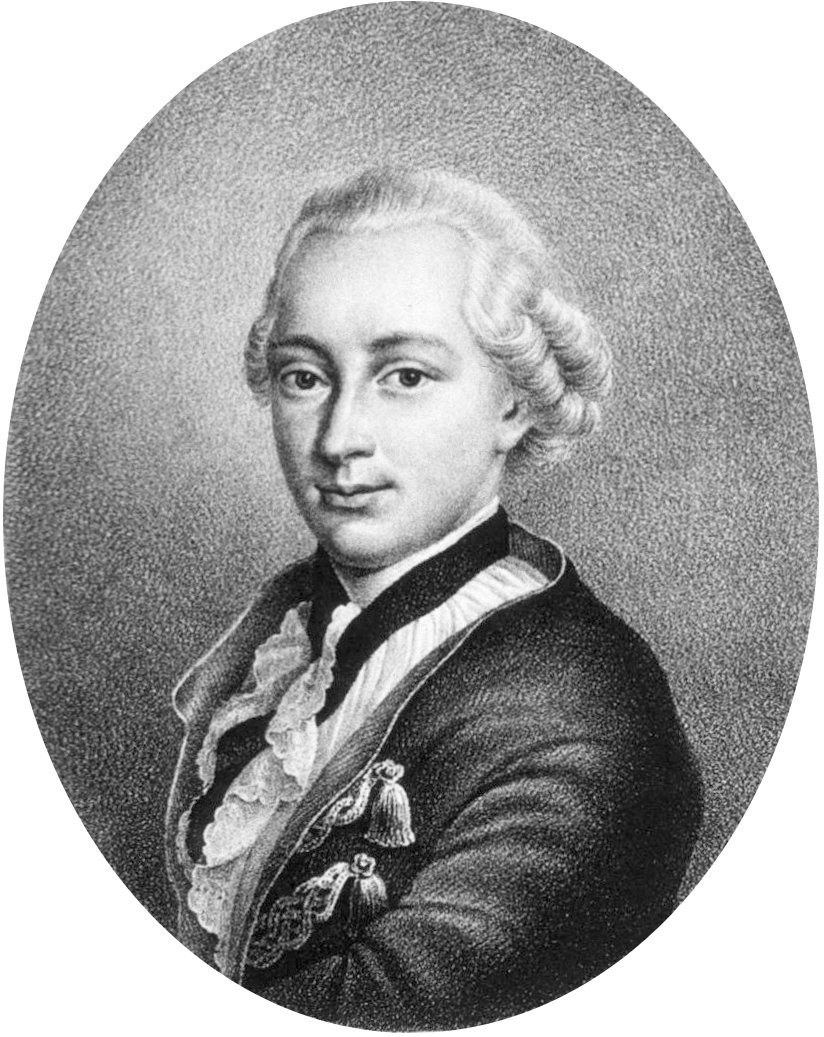
- Born: 27 April 1733; Sulz am Neckar, Kingdom of Württemberg, Holy Roman Empire
- Died: 11 November 1806 (aged 73); Karlsruhe, Grand Duchy of Baden, Confederation of the Rhine
- Known for: Reciprocal cross

Joseph Gottlieb Kölreuter (27 April 1733 – 11 November 1806), also spelled Koelreuter or Kohlreuter, was a German botanist who pioneered the study of plant fertilisation, hybridisation and was the first to detect self-incompatibility. He was an observer as well as a rigorous experimenter who used careful crossing experiments although he did not inquire into the nature of heritability.

== Biography ==
Kölreuter was the oldest of three sons of an apothecary in Karlsruhe, Germany, and grew up in Sulz. He took an early interest in natural history and made a collection of local insects. At the age of fifteen he went to study medicine at the University of Tübingen under physician and botanist Johann Georg Gmelin who had returned from St. Petersburg. Gmelin had an interest in floral biology and he reprinted a work by Rudolf Jakob Camerarius (who also taught at Tübingen) who was the first to demonstrate sexual reproduction in plants. In his inaugural address in 1749 Gmelin talked the need for research on the origin of new species by hybridisation. This may have had an influence on Kölreuter. Gmelin died in 1755, and Kolreuter earned his degree and received an appointment at the Imperial Academy of Sciences at St. Petersburg on 23 December 1755. Here his work included botany as well as the curation of the fish and coral collections. He stayed on until 6 June 1761. From 1759 he experimented on plant hybridisation before returning to Germany. He moved to Calw in 1763 and Karlsruhe in 1764 where he was briefly professor of natural history and director of the botanical garden at Carlsruhe, Baden. He was dismissed from the botanical garden after a dispute with the head gardener about his 'futil' experiments in 1783 but stayed as a professor until 1806 when he died.

== Researches ==
Kölreuter followed the standard idea of the period of plants and nature personified by a Creator. He expected patterns, for instance, homogeneity in the male and female contributions to the progeny. He also strongly believed in epigenetic influences which may have been derived from the teachings of C. F. Wolff. The dominant belief during his time was that an offspring was already preformed in the female or the male and that the embryo was developed after sex and the origin decided the offspring's characteristics or similarities to the parent. Kölreuter, however noted a mixing of characters and proposed the idea of “seed matters” (Saamenstoffe). According to Kölreuter there had to be two uniform fluids, male and female semen which combined in the process of fertilisation. He believed that equal quantities of the male and female fluid were needed and he therefore examined how much pollen was needed in fertilisation of a given number of seeds. In flowers with multiple stigmas, he cut all but one and found that pollinating it was enough to fertilise all the seeds. He examined the action of stigma fluid on pollen, described many plant species, and studied pollen and its transfer.

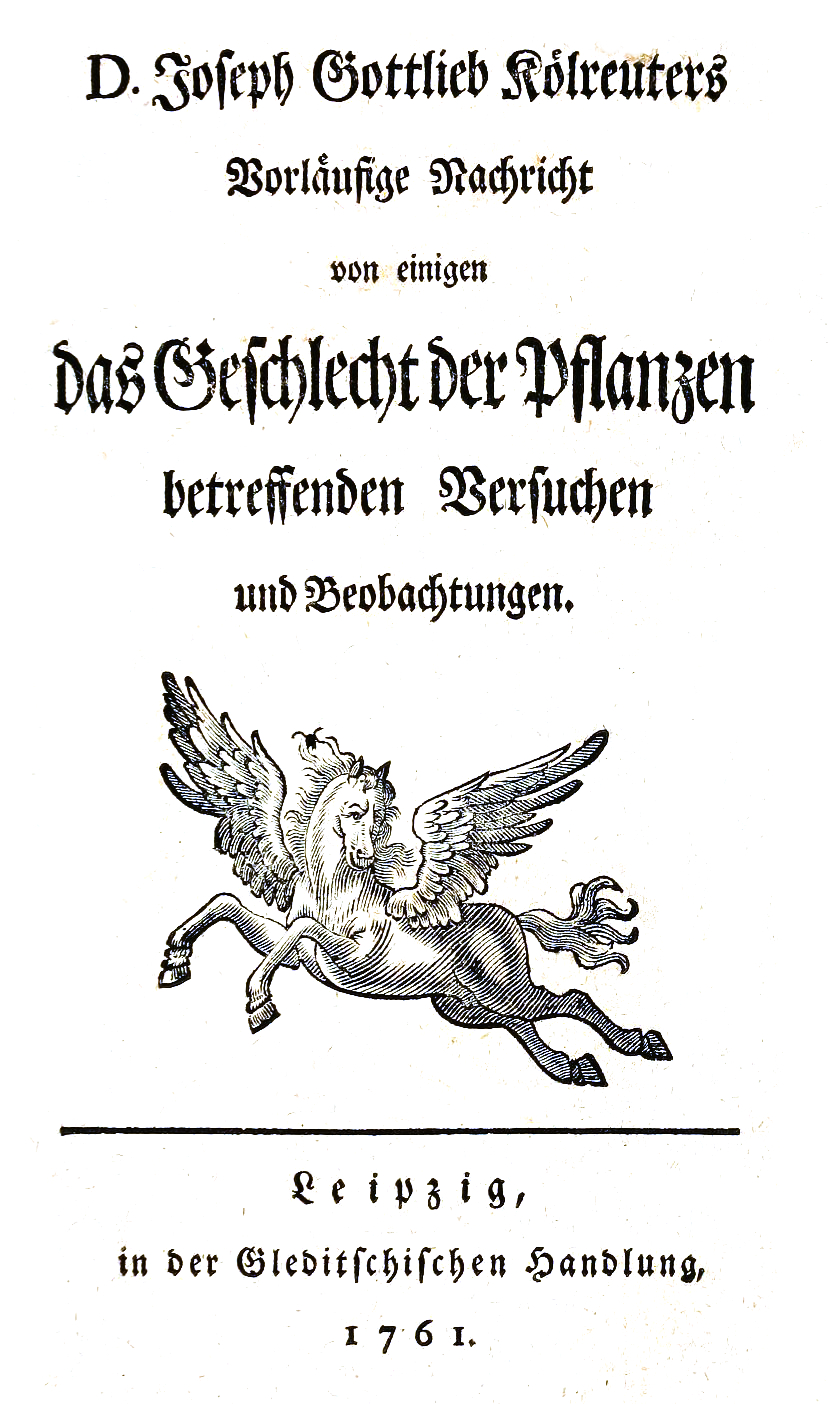
Title page of the 1761 book

Kölreuter's major works were produced as four reports Vorlaufige Nachricht von einigen das Geschlecht der Pflanzen betreffenden Versuchen und Beobachtungen (1761), Fortsetzung (1763), Zweyte Fortsetzung (1764), and Dritte Fortsetzung (1766). They were reprinted in 1893 in Wilhelm Ostwald's Klassiker der exakten Wissenschaften. Kolreuter's findings are not reported in easy to read sections but are distributed throughout the text. Many parts have not been fully translated to English and this has led to many of the results not being examined well. In all he conducted nearly 500 different hybridisation experiments across 138 species and examined the pollen characteristics of over 1000 plant species. The first documentation of male sterility in 1763 was by Kölreuter, who observed anther abortion within species and specific hybrids. Koelreuter was the first who reported self-incompatibility in Verbascum phoeniceum plants. He also observed heterosis, that hybrids surpassed their parents. His experimental method included repetitions and controls. He wanted to test if hybrids across species could be fertile. Buffon had used the idea of sterility of crosses as a method of testing species boundaries. Buffon used sterility versus fertility as a criterion for species but he gave up the idea in 1753 when he found fertile hybrids in domestic animals and cagebirds. Linnaeus through his student J. J. Hartmann reported the possibility of new "species" arising from hybridisation but Kölreuter was skeptical of the results. In one experiment Kölreuter sat beside a flower from dawn to dusk and shooed away all insects to find that the flower remained unfertilised. He tested a hypothesis by Jan Swammerdam that honey was nectar that underwent fermentation in the crop of a bee. Kölreuter collected nectar from many hundreds of orange trees and kept them in vials to evaporate and he reported that it thickened and tasted like honey with time. Kölreuter produced interspecific hybrids – specifically the tobacco plants Nicotiana rustica and Nicotiana paniculata in 1760. The hybrids showed male sterility. He also worked on Dianthus and Verbascum. He found that reciprocal crossing produced identical results. He also pondered over the commercial applications of hybridisation – "I would wish that I or somebody else would be so lucky someday to produce a species hybrid of trees which, with respect to the use of its lumber, would have a large influence on the economy. Among other good properties such trees might perhaps also have the one that they would reach their full size in one half of the time of normal trees" (translated by Ernst Mayr). Although Kölreuter conducted a variety of repeated crossing experiments much in the manner of Gregor Mendel, his interpretations were based on alchemical notions and he did not seek to examine the nature of heritability or the particulateness of heritable traits. Kölreuter followed an idea from alchemistry that metals were a mixture of mercury and sulphur and considered likewise that an equilibrium of the male and female "seed matters" had a role in deciding the qualities of hybrid offspring.

Although Koelreuter did not endorse the transmutation of species, his hybridisation research influenced the development of evolutionary theory in the eighteenth century.

The genus Koelreuteria has been named in his honour.

== Works ==
- Dissertatio inauguralis medica de insectis coleopteris, nec non de plantis quibusdam rarioribus... Tubingae: litteris Erhardianis (1755).
- Vorläufige Nachricht von einigen, das Geschlecht der Pflanzen betreffenden Versuchen (1761–1766).
- Das entdeckte Geheimniss der Cryptogamie (1777).
