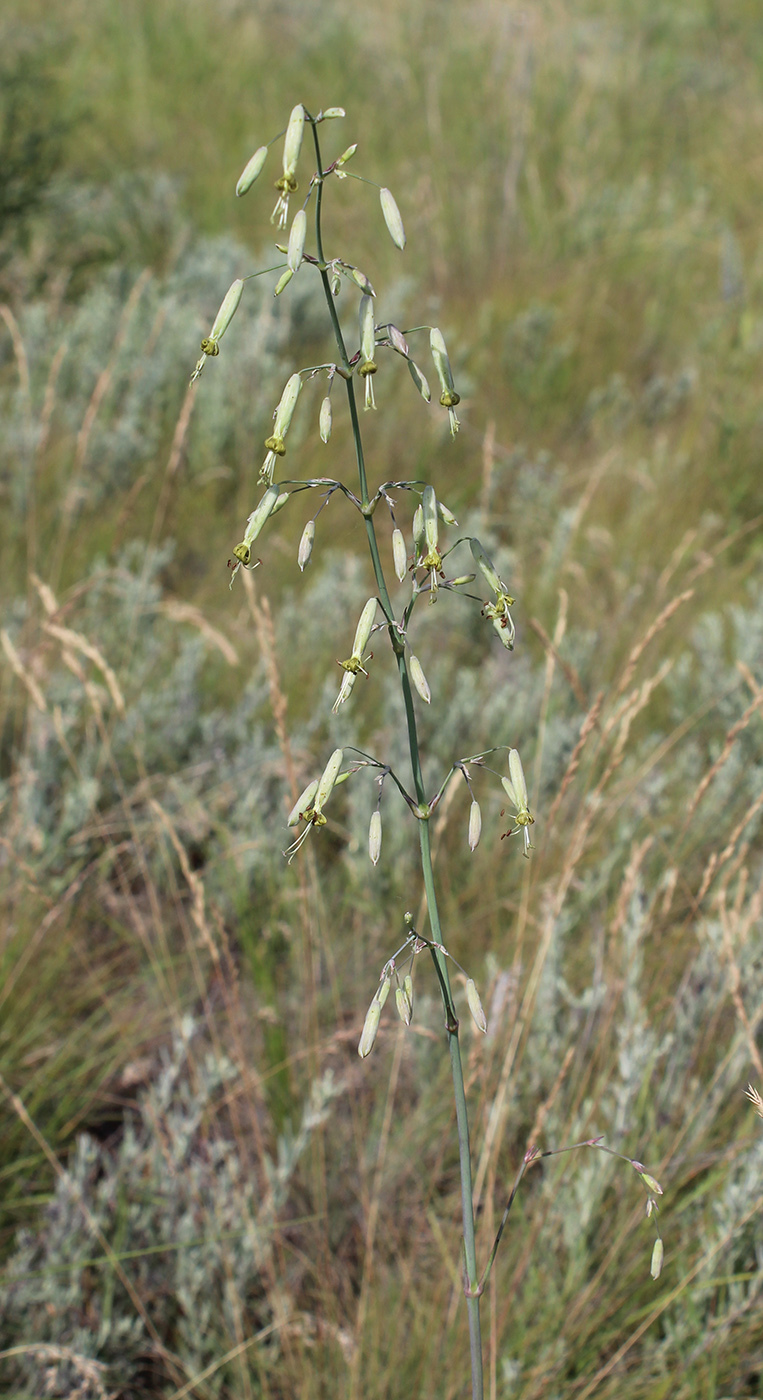

Scientific classification
- Kingdom: Plantae
- Clade: Tracheophytes
- Clade: Angiosperms
- Clade: Eudicots
- Order: Caryophyllales
- Family: Caryophyllaceae
- Genus: Silene
- Species: S. chlorantha

Binomial name
- Silene chlorantha (Willd.) Ehrh.

= Silene chlorantha =

Species of flowering plant

Silene chlorantha is a species of flowering plant belonging to the family Caryophyllaceae.

Its native range is Europe to Central Asia.
