= Paul Knuth =

19th-century German botanist and ecologist

Paul Erich Otto Wilhelm Knuth (20 November 1854 in Greifswald – 30 October 1900 in Kiel) was a 19th-century German botanist and pollination ecologist.

He studied chemistry and natural history at the University of Greifswald and obtained his doctorate degree in 1876. He then took up a career as "high school" (Realschule) teacher, first in Iserlohn in Westphalia and from 1881 in Kiel. Parallel with his teaching duties, he found time to study the flora of Schleswig-Holstein and the North Frisian Islands and meticulous studies of plant-pollinator interactions, which he published in his monumental work Handbuch der Blütenbiologie (Handbook of Flower Biology; from 1898 and continued after his death by Otto Appel and Ernst Loew). From 1891 he suffered from illness. He was granted leave of absence to visit the botanic garden at Buitenzorg in Java, where he stayed for five months and did pollination studies. He returned to Kiel via Japan, California and New York.
