= Hermann Müller (German botanist) =

German botanist (1829–1883)

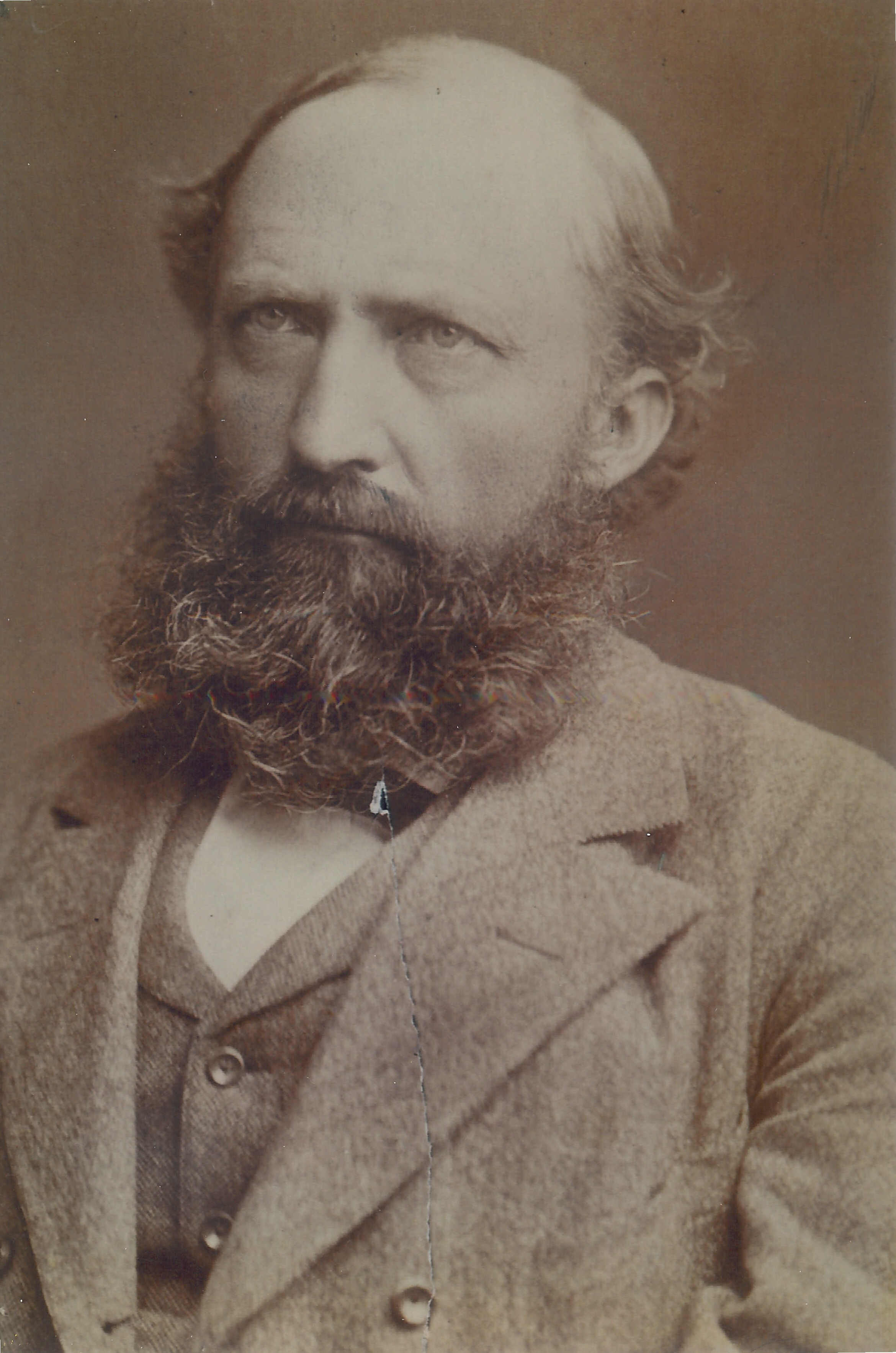
Prof. Dr. Hermann Müller (Lippstadt)

Heinrich Ludwig Hermann Müller (23 September 1829 – 25 August 1883) was a German botanist. Between 1864 and 1867 he edited an exsiccata series distributing bryophyte specimens under the title Westfalens Laubmoose, gesammelt und herausgegeben von Dr. H. Müller in Lippstadt. "Müller-Lippstadt" provided important evidence for Darwin's theory of evolution.

== Career ==
Müller was an early investigator of coevolution.^{p27} He was the author in 1873 of Die Befruchtung der Blumen durch Insekten, a book translated at the suggestion of Darwin in 1883 as The Fertilisation of Flowers. He and Darwin corresponded; 36 letters between the two, or from Darwin concerning Müller, are recorded. Darwin cited him extensively in The Descent of Man for his information relating to the behavior of bees.

Hermann was the brother of Fritz Müller,^{p29} the German doctor who lived in Santa Catarina, Southern Brazil and researched its natural history. Fritz Müller wrote the first book in support of Darwinian evolution in German,"Für Darwin"; he is also known as the discoverer of Müllerian mimicry. The work of both brothers was well known to Darwin.

Müller was increasingly attacked by conservative circles in Germany for his ideas about evolution. The discussion escalated in 1879 and was even brought to the Prussian Assembly, after Müller had dealt in his teaching with a work by the German Darwinist and popular writer Ernst Krause. Yet, the Prussian state did not dismiss Müller.

== Selected publications ==
- Die Befruchtung der Blumen (The Fertilisation of Flowers, 1883) [Translated by D'Arcy Wentworth Thompson with a Preface by Charles Darwin]
