= Pollination syndrome =

Flower traits that attract pollinators

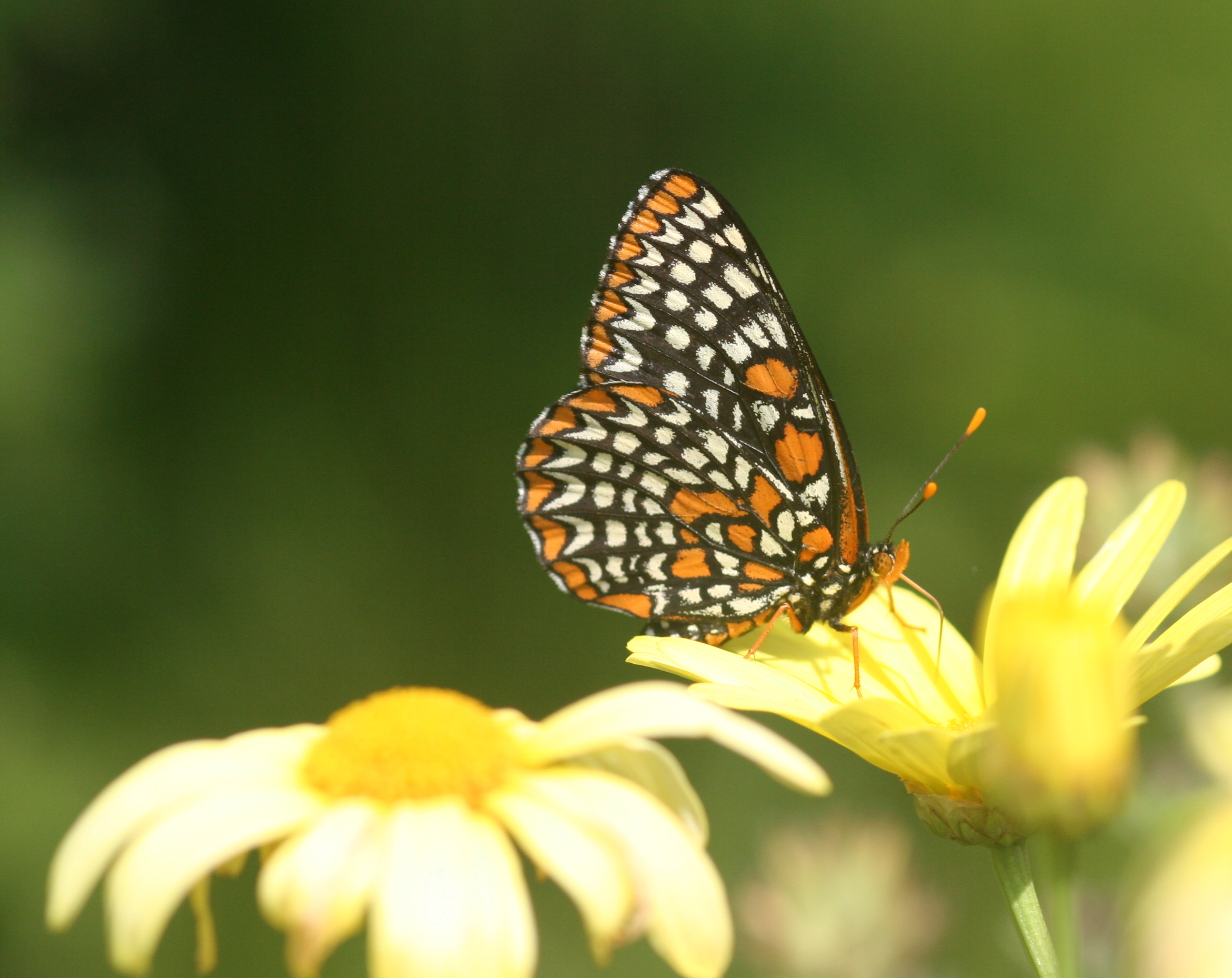
Baltimore Checkerspot (Euphydryas phaeton) nectaring at daisy (Argyranthemum)

Pollination syndromes are suites of flower traits that have evolved in response to natural selection imposed by different pollen vectors, which can be abiotic (wind and water) or biotic, such as birds, bees, flies, and so forth through a process called pollinator-mediated selection, a form of selection pressure. These traits include flower shape, size, colour, odour, reward type and amount, nectar composition, timing of flowering, etc. For example, tubular red flowers with copious nectar often attract birds; foul smelling flowers attract carrion flies or beetles, etc.

The "classical" pollination syndromes were first studied in the 19th century by the Italian botanist Federico Delpino. Although they are useful in understanding of plant-pollinator interactions, sometimes the pollinator of a plant species cannot be accurately predicted from the pollination syndrome alone, and caution must be exerted in making assumptions.

The naturalist Charles Darwin surmised that the flower of the orchid Angraecum sesquipedale was pollinated by a then undiscovered moth with a proboscis whose length was unprecedented at the time. His prediction had gone unverified until 21 years after his death, when the moth was discovered and his conjecture vindicated. The story of its postulated pollinator has come to be seen as one of the celebrated predictions of the theory of evolution.

== Abiotic ==
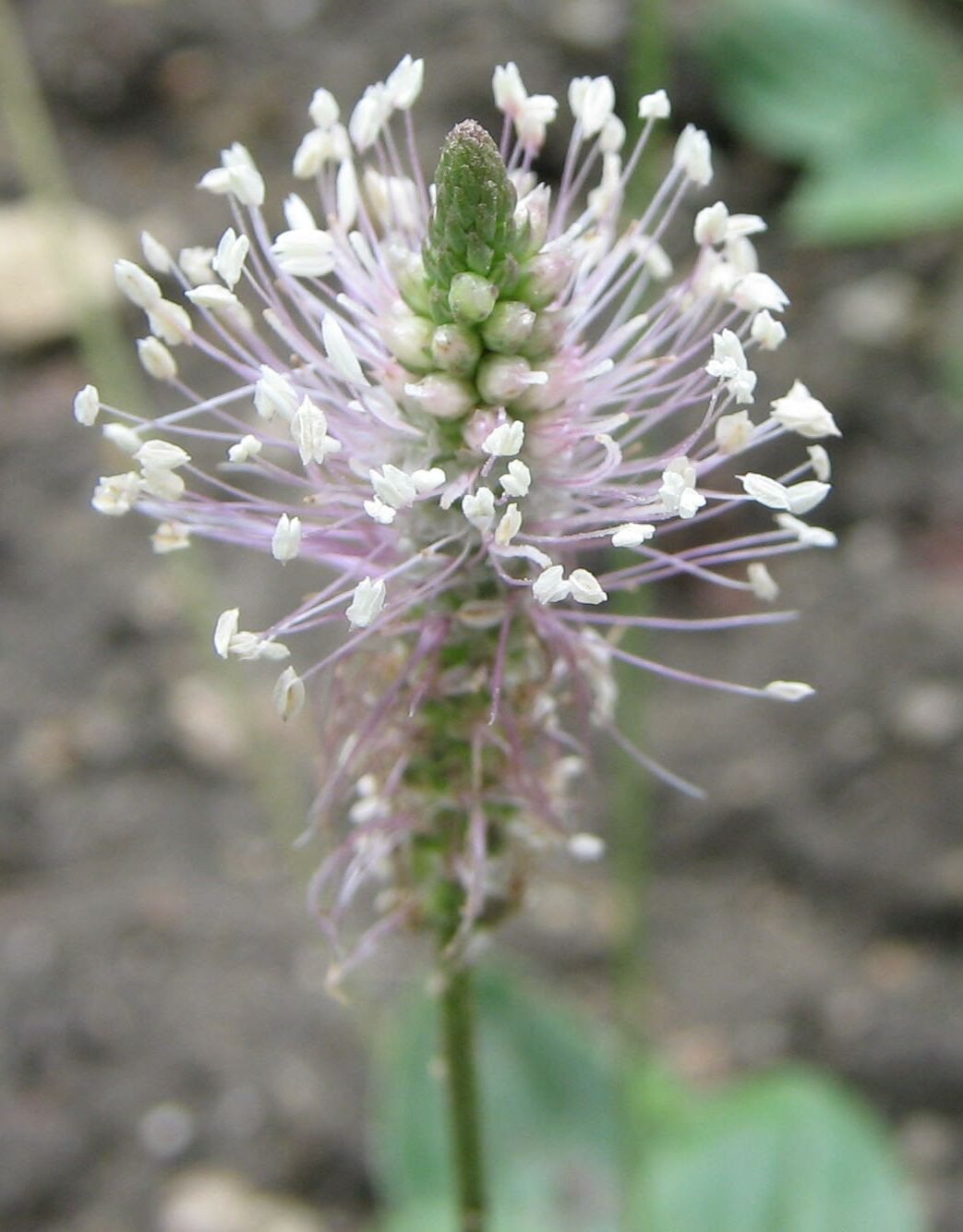
Plantago media, pollinated by wind or insects

Abiotically pollinated flowers do not attract animal pollinators. Nevertheless, they often have suites of shared traits.

=== Wind ===
Wind-pollinated flowers may be small and inconspicuous, as well as green and not showy. They produce enormous numbers of relatively small pollen grains (hence wind-pollinated plants may be allergens, but seldom are animal-pollinated plants allergenic). Their stigmas may be large and feathery to catch the pollen grains. Insects may visit them to collect pollen; in some cases, these are ineffective pollinators and exert little natural selection on the flowers, but there are also examples of ambophilous flowers which are both wind and insect pollinated. Anemophilous, or wind pollinated flowers, are usually small and inconspicuous, and do not possess a scent or produce nectar. The anthers may produce a large number of pollen grains, while the stamens are generally long and protrude out of the flower.

=== Water ===
Water-pollinated plants are aquatic and pollen is released into the water. Water currents therefore act as a pollen vector in a similar way to wind currents. Their flowers tend to be small and inconspicuous with many pollen grains and large, feathery stigmas to catch the pollen. However, this is relatively uncommon (only 2% of pollination is hydrophily) and most aquatic plants are insect-pollinated, with flowers that emerge into the air. Vallisneria is an example.

== Biotic ==
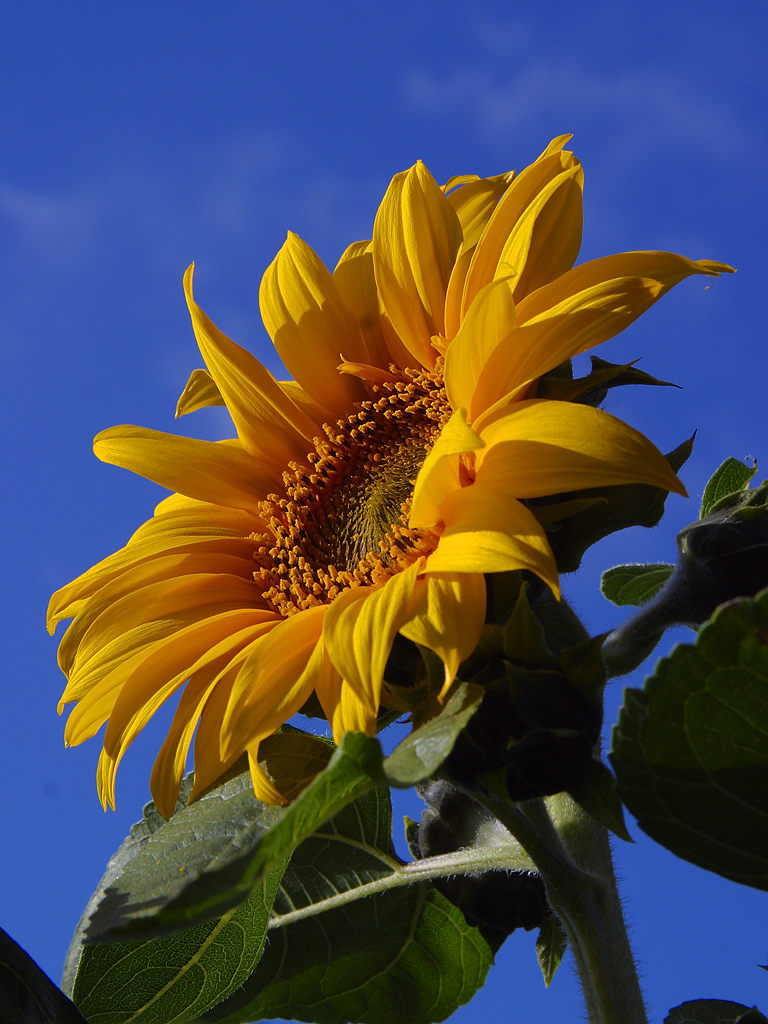
Sunflower pollinated by butterflies and bees

=== Insects ===
==== Bees ====
Bee-pollinated flowers can be very variable in their size, shape and colouration. They can be open and bowl-shaped ('actinomorphic', radially symmetrical) or more complex and non-radially symmetric ('zygomorphic'), as is the case with many peas and foxgloves.

Some bee flowers tend to be yellow or blue, often with ultraviolet nectar guides and scent. Nectar, pollen, or both are offered as rewards in varying amounts. The sugar in the nectar tends to be sucrose-dominated. A few bees collect oil from special glands on the flower.

==== Butterflies ====
Butterfly-pollinated flowers tend to be large and showy, pink or lavender in colour, frequently have a landing area, and are usually scented. Since butterflies do not digest pollen (with one exception), more nectar is offered than pollen. The flowers have simple nectar guides with the nectaries usually hidden in narrow tubes or spurs, reached by the long tongue of the butterflies.

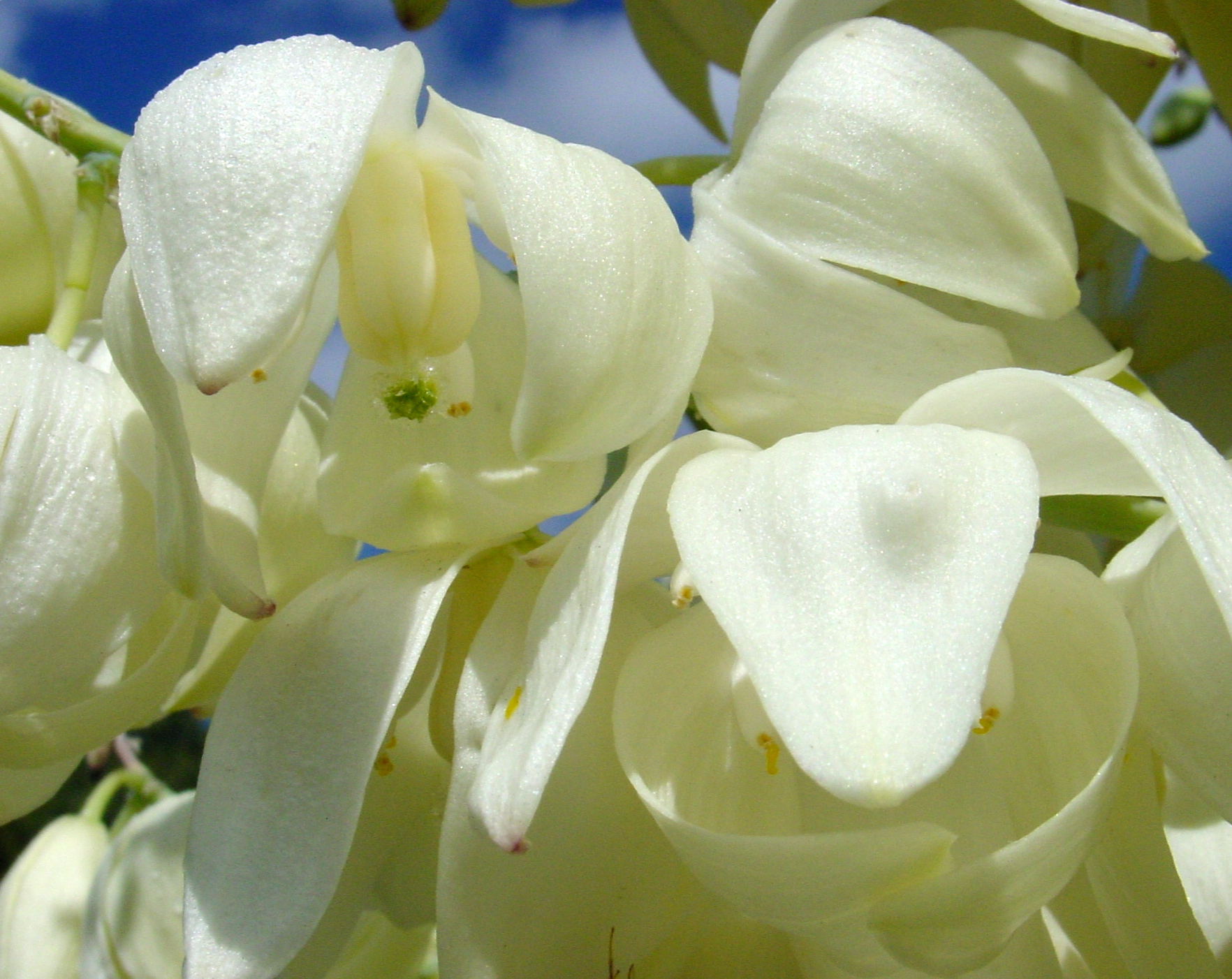
The moth-pollinated Hesperoyucca whipplei

==== Moths ====
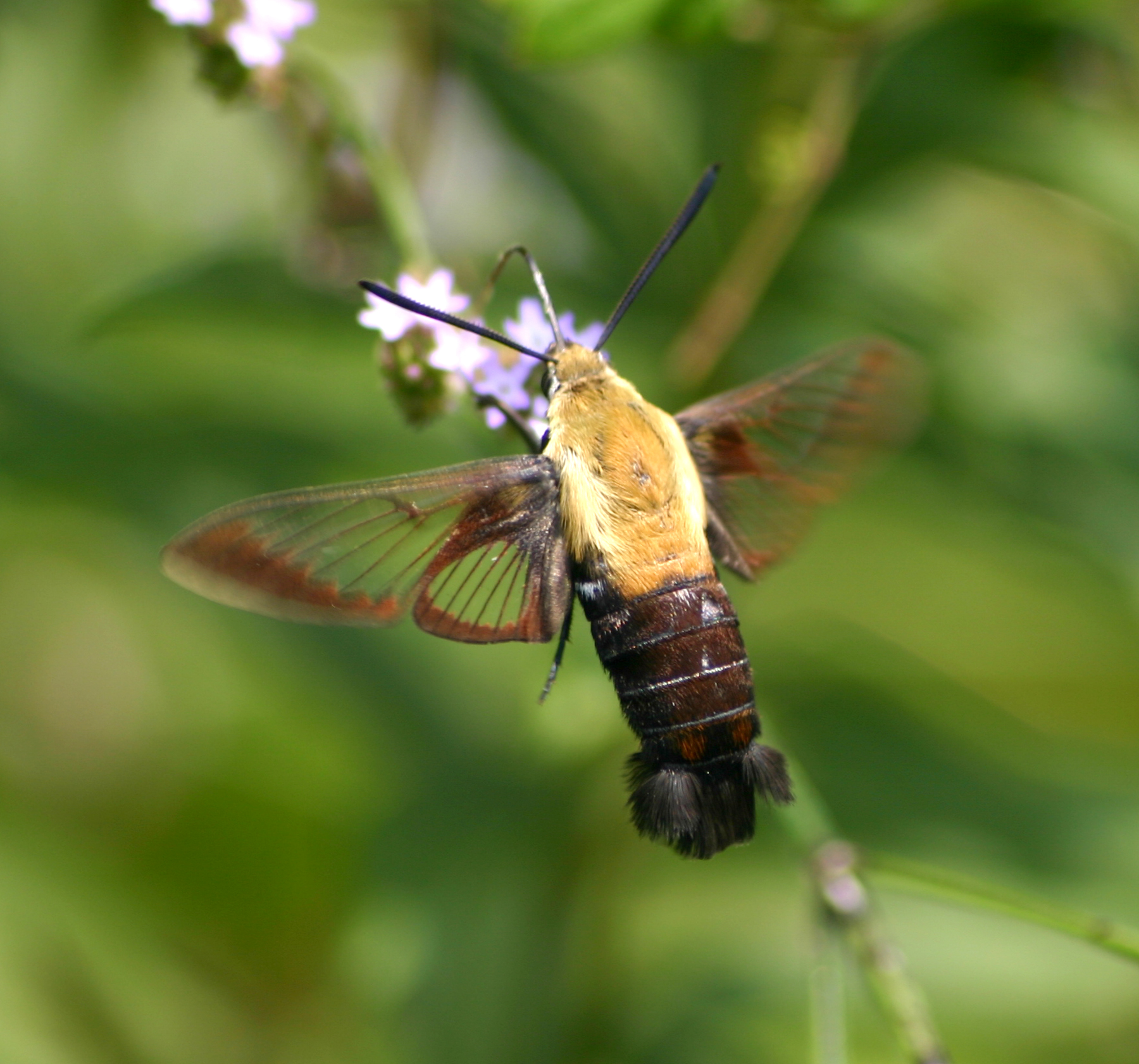
Day-flying sphinx moth nectaring on Brazilian vervain

Among the more important moth pollinators are the hawk moths (Sphingidae). Their behaviour is similar to hummingbirds: they hover in front of flowers with rapid wingbeats. Most are nocturnal or crepuscular. So moth-pollinated flowers tend to be white, night-opening, large and showy with tubular corollas and a strong, sweet scent produced in the evening, night or early morning. Much nectar is produced to fuel the high metabolic rates needed to power their flight.

Other moths (Noctuids, Geometrids, Pyralids, for example) fly slowly and settle on the flower. They do not require as much nectar as the fast-flying hawk moths, and the flowers tend to be small (though they may be aggregated in heads).

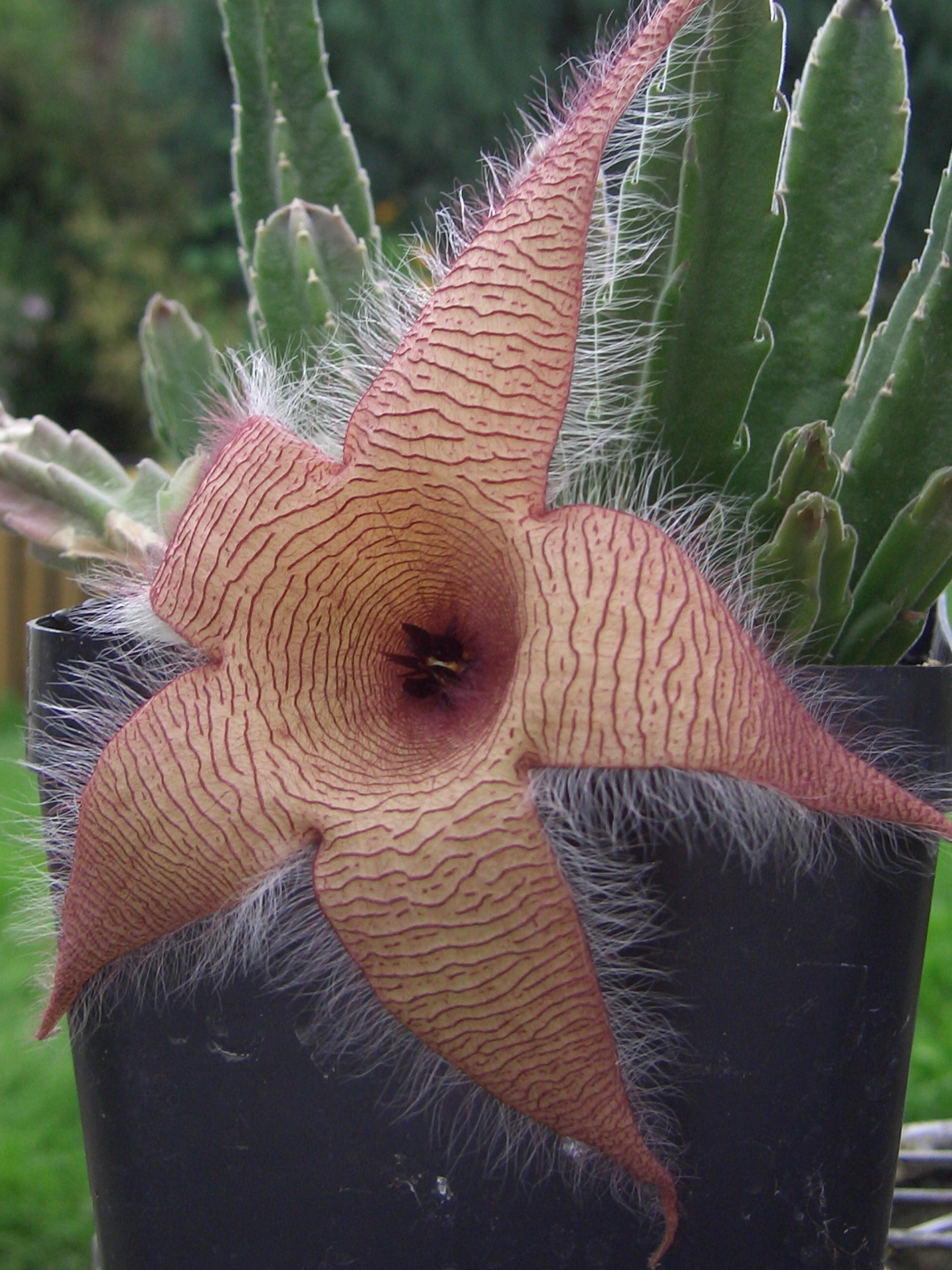
Sapromyophilous Stapelia gigantea

==== Flies ====
Myophilous plants, those pollinated by flies, tend not to emit a strong scent, are typically purple, violet, blue, and white, and have open dishes or tubes.

Sapromyophilous plants attract flies which normally visit dead animals or dung. Flowers mimic the odor of such objects. The plant provides them with no reward and they leave quickly unless it has traps to slow them down. Such plants are far less common than myophilous ones.

==== Beetles ====
Beetle-pollinated flowers are usually large, greenish or off-white in color and heavily scented. Scents may be spicy, fruity, or similar to decaying organic material. Most beetle-pollinated flowers are flattened or dish shaped, with pollen easily accessible, although they may include traps to keep the beetle longer. The plant's ovaries are usually well protected from the biting mouthparts of their pollinators. A number of cantharophilous plants are thermogenic, with flowers that can increase their temperature. This heat is thought to help further spread the scent, but the infrared light produced by this heat may also be visible to insects during the dark night, and act as a shining beacon to attract them.

=== Birds ===
Flowers pollinated by specialist nectarivores tend to be large, red or orange tubes with a lot of dilute nectar, secreted during the day. Since birds do not have a strong response to scent, they tend to be odorless. Flowers pollinated by generalist birds are often shorter and wider. Hummingbirds are often associated with pendulous flowers, whereas passerines (perching birds) need a landing platform so flowers and surrounding structures are often more robust. Also, many plants have anthers placed in the flower so that pollen rubs against the birds head/back as the bird reaches in for nectar.

=== Bats ===
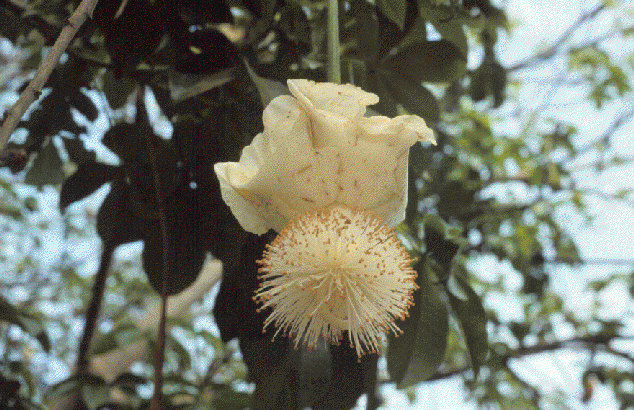
African baobab (bat-pollinated)

There are major differences between bat pollination in the New World as opposed to the Old World. In the Old World pollinating bats are large fruit bats of the family Pteropodidae which do not have the ability to hover and must perch in the plant to lap the nectar; these bats furthermore do not have the ability to echolocate. Bat-pollinated flowers in this part of the world tend to be large and showy, white or light coloured, open at night and have strong musty odours. They are often large balls of stamens.

In the Americas pollinating bats are tiny creatures called glossophagines which have both the ability to hover as well as echolocate, and have extremely long tongues. Plants in this part of the world are often pollinated by both bats and hummingbirds, and have long tubular flowers. Flowers in this part of the world are typically borne away from the trunk or other obstructions, and offer nectar for extended periods of time. In one essay, von Helversen et al. speculate that maybe some bell-shaped flowers have evolved to attract bats in the Americas, as the bell-shape might reflect the sonar pulses emitted by the bats in a recognisable pattern. A number of species of Marcgravia from Caribbean islands have evolved a special leaf just above the inflorescence to attract bats. The leaf petiole is twisted so the leaf sticks upwards, and the leaf is shaped like a concave disc or dish reflector. The leaf reflects echolocation signals from many directions, guiding the pollinating bats towards the flowers. The epiphytic bean Mucuna holtonii employs a similar tactic, but in this species it is a specialised petal that acts as a sonar reflector. In the New World bat pollinated flowers often have sulphur-scented compounds.

Bat-pollinated plants have bigger pollen than their relatives.

=== Non-flying mammals ===
The characteristics of the pollination syndrome associated with pollination by mammals which are not bats are: a yeasty odour; cryptic, drab, axillary, geoflorous flowers or inflorescences often obscured from sight; large and sturdy flowers, or grouped together as multi-flowered inflorescences; either sessile flowers or inflorescences or subtended by a short and stout peduncle or pedicel; bowl-shaped flowers or inflorescences; copious, sucrose-rich nectar usually produced during the night; tough and wiry styles; an adequate distance between the stigma and nectar to fit the rostrum of the pollinating animal; and potentially a winter–spring flowering period.

Many non-flying mammals are nocturnal and have an acute sense of smell, so the plants tend not to have bright showy colours, but instead secrete a strong odour. These plants also tend to produce large amounts of pollen because mammals are larger than some other pollinators, and lack the precision smaller pollinators can achieve.

The Western-Australian endemic Honey possum (Tarsipes rostratus) is an unusual non-flying mammal pollinator in that it has adapted to feeding exclusively on pollen and nectar. It is known to forage on a wide variety of plants (particularly in the families Proteaceae and Myrtaceae) including many with typical bird-pollinated flowers such as Calothamnus quadrifidus and many species of Banksia.

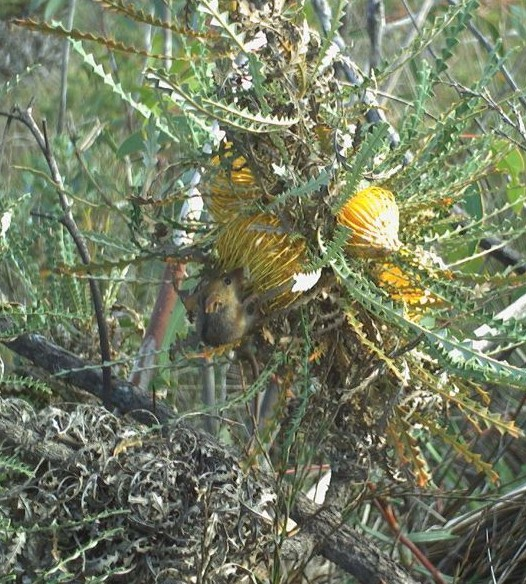
A honey possum (Tarsipes rostratus) feeding during daytime on an inflorescence of Banksia nobilis subsp. fragrans at Hi Vallee Farm in Western Australia

== Biology ==
Pollination syndromes reflect convergent evolution towards forms (phenotypes) that limit the number of species of pollinators visiting the plant. They increase the functional specialization of the plant with regard to pollination, though this may not affect the ecological specialization (i.e. the number of species of pollinators within that functional group). They are responses to common selection pressures exerted by shared pollinators or abiotic pollen vectors, which generate correlations among traits. That is, if two distantly related plant species are both pollinated by nocturnal moths, for example, their flowers will converge on a form which is recognised by the moths (e.g. pale colour, sweet scent, nectar released at the base of a long tube, night-flowering).

=== Advantages of specialization ===
- Efficiency of pollination: the rewards given to pollinators (commonly nectar or pollen or both, but sometimes oil, scents, resins, or wax) may be costly to produce. Nectar can be cheap, but pollen is generally expensive as it is relatively high in nitrogen compounds. Plants have evolved to obtain the maximum pollen transfer for the minimum reward delivered. Different pollinators, because of their size, shape, or behaviour, have different efficiencies of transfer of pollen. And the floral traits affect efficiency of transfer: columbine flowers were experimentally altered and presented to hawkmoths, and flower orientation, shape, and colour were found to affect visitation rates or pollen removal.
- Pollinator constancy: to efficiently transfer pollen, it is best for the plant if the pollinator focuses on one species of plant, ignoring other species. Otherwise, pollen may be dropped uselessly on the stigmas of other species. Animals, of course, do not aim to pollinate, they aim to collect food as fast as they can. However, many pollinator species exhibit constancy, passing up available flowers to focus on one plant species. Why should animals specialize on a plant species, rather than move to the next flower of any species? Although pollinator constancy was recognized by Aristotle, the benefits to animals are not yet fully understood. The most common hypothesis is that pollinators must learn to handle particular types of flowers, and they have limited capacity to learn different types. They can only efficiently gather rewards from one type of flower.

These honeybees selectively visit flowers from only one species for a period of time, as can be seen by the colour of the pollen in their baskets.

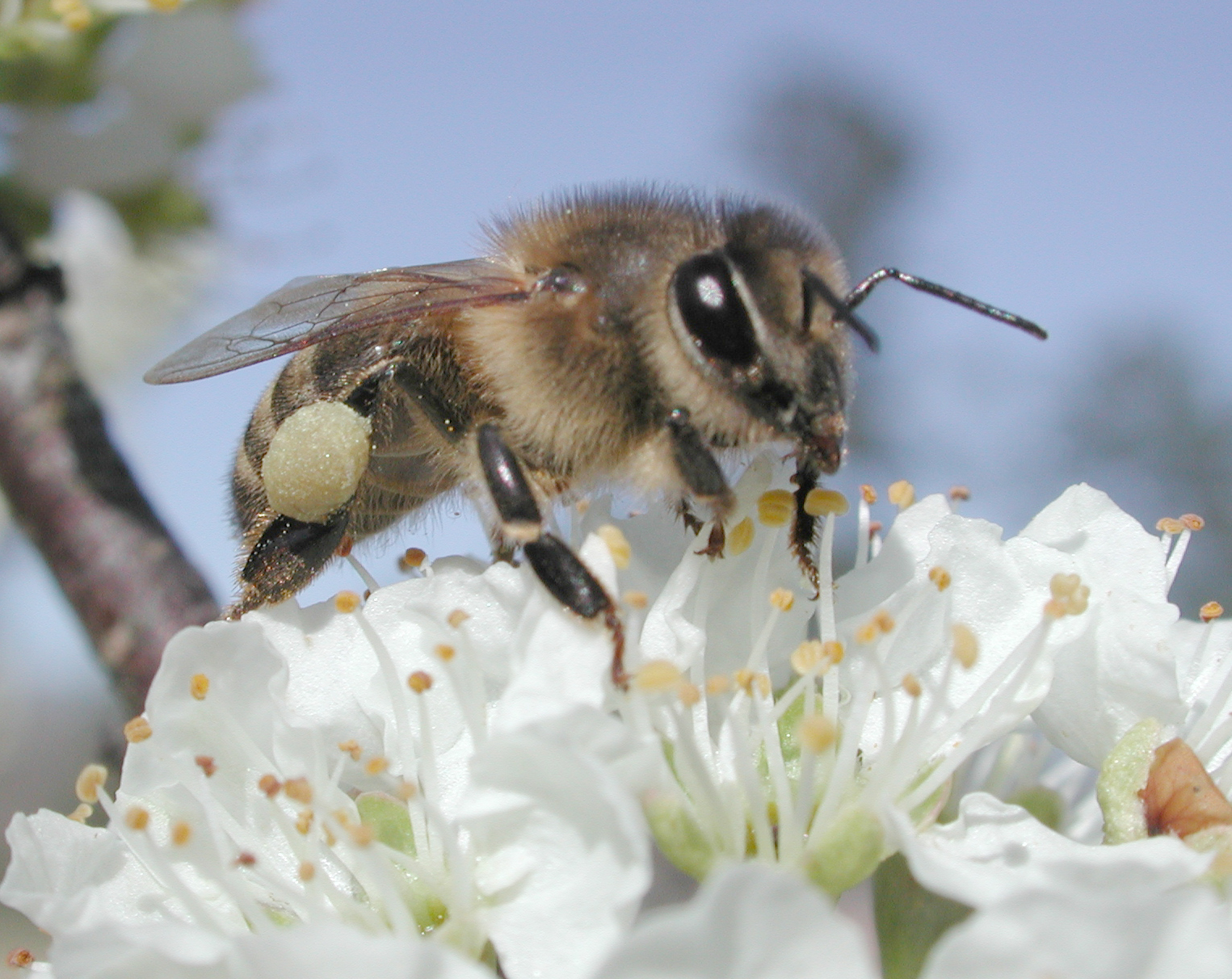

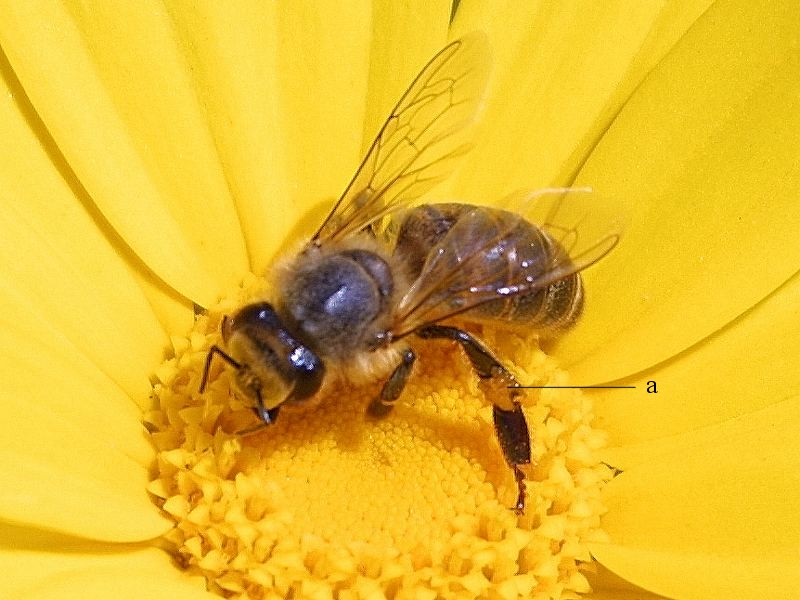

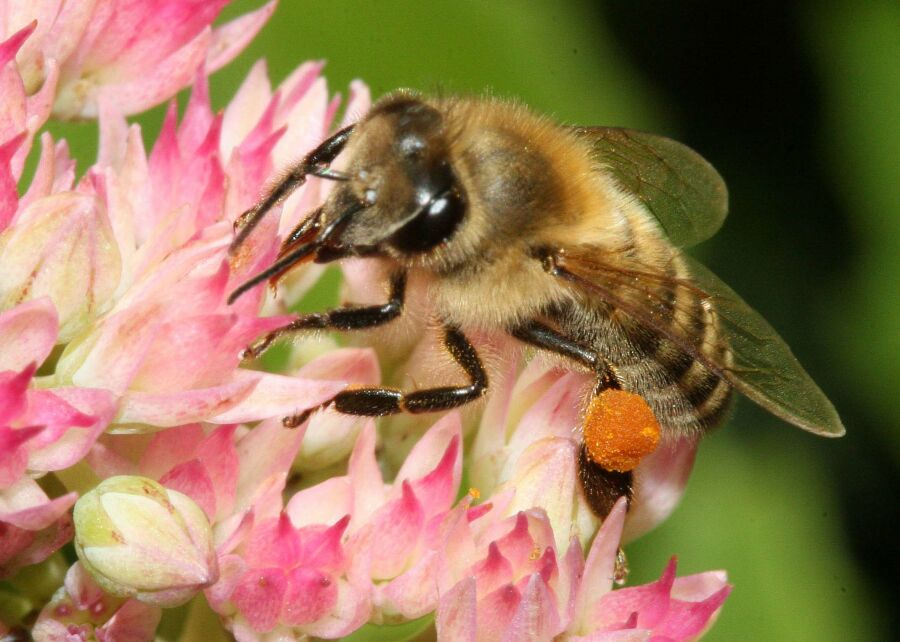

=== Advantages of generalization ===
Pollinators fluctuate in abundance and activity independently of their plants, and any one species may fail to pollinate a plant in a particular year. Thus a plant may be at an advantage if it attracts several species or types of pollinators, ensuring pollen transfer every year. Many species of plants have the back-up option of self-pollination, if they are not self-incompatible.

=== A continuum rather than discrete syndromes ===
Whilst it is clear that pollination syndromes can be observed in nature, there has been much debate amongst scientists as to how frequent they are and to what extent we can use the classical syndromes to classify plant-pollinator interactions. Although some species of plants are visited only by one type of animal (i.e. they are functionally specialized), many plant species are visited by very different pollinators. For example, a flower may be pollinated by bees, butterflies, and birds. Strict specialization of plants relying on one species of pollinator is relatively rare, probably because it can result in variable reproductive success across years as pollinator populations vary significantly. In such cases, plants should generalize on a wide range of pollinators, and such ecological generalization is frequently found in nature. A study in Tasmania found the syndromes did not usefully predict the pollinators.

A critical re-evaluation of the syndromes suggests that on average about one third of the flowering plants can be classified into the classical syndromes. This reflects the fact that nature is much less predictable and straightforward than 19th-century biologists originally thought. Pollination syndromes can be thought of as extremes of a continuum of greater or lesser specialization or generalization onto particular functional groups of pollinators that exert similar selective pressures" and the frequency with which flowers conform to the expectations of the pollination syndromes is relatively rare. In addition, new types of plant-pollinator interaction, involving "unusual" pollinating animals are regularly being discovered, such as specialized pollination by spider hunting wasps (Pompilidae) and fruit chafers (Cetoniidae) in the eastern grasslands of South Africa. These plants do not fit into the classical syndromes, though they may show evidence of convergent evolution in their own right.

An analysis of flower traits and visitation in 49 species in the plant genus Penstemon found that it was possible to separate bird- and bee- pollinated species quite well, but only by using floral traits which were not considered in the classical accounts of syndromes, such as the details of anther opening. Although a recent review concluded that there is "overwhelming evidence that functional groups exert different selection pressures on floral traits", the sheer complexity and subtlety of plant-pollinator interactions (and the growing recognition that non-pollinating organisms such as seed predators can affect the evolution of flower traits) means that this debate is likely to continue for some time.

== See also ==
- Pollinator-mediated selection
- Mutualism (biology)
- Floral biology
- Pollination trap
- Monocotyledon reproduction

== Bibliography ==
- Faegri, K.; Pijl, L. Van Der (1980) [1966]. Principles of Pollination Ecology (3rd ed.). Elsevier. ISBN 978-1-4832-9303-5.
