= Delpino =

Delpino is a surname. Notable people with the surname include:

- Federico Delpino, Italian botanist
- Robert Delpino (born 1964), American football player

== Fictional characters ==
- Vinnie Delpino, fictional character of Doogie Howser, M.D.

== See also ==
- 14104 Delpino, a main-belt asteroid
