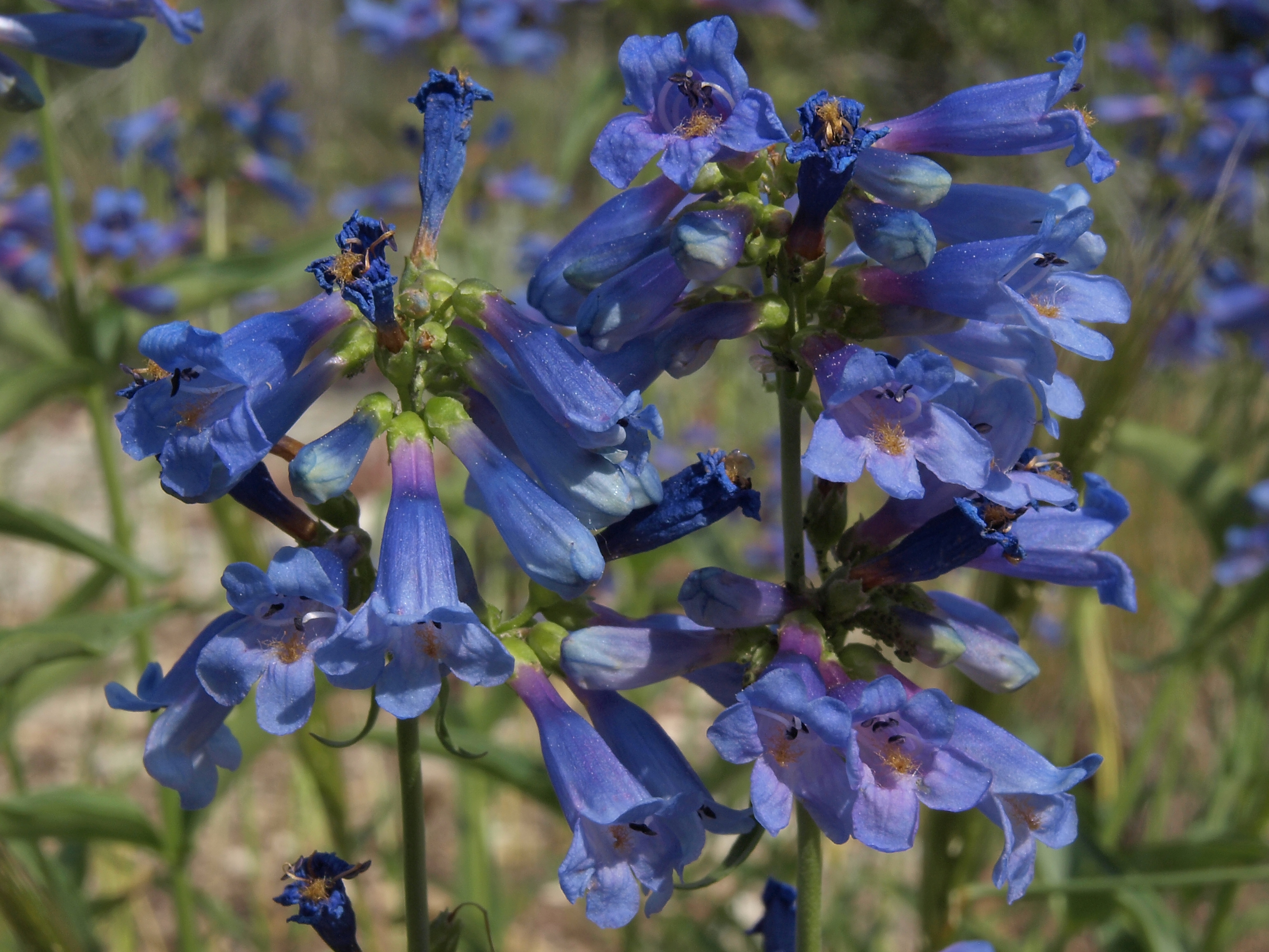

Conservation status
- Secure (NatureServe)

Scientific classification
- Kingdom: Plantae
- Clade: Tracheophytes
- Clade: Angiosperms
- Clade: Eudicots
- Clade: Asterids
- Order: Lamiales
- Family: Plantaginaceae
- Genus: Penstemon
- Species: P. watsonii

Binomial name
- Penstemon watsonii A.Gray, 1878

Synonyms
- Penstemon phlogifolius Greene (1906); Penstemon watsonii subsp. typicus D.D.Keck (1945)

= Penstemon watsonii =

Plant species in the plantain family

Penstemon watsonii is a flowering plant that grows largely in Nevada, Utah, and Colorado. It grows in dry rocky areas and has blue to violet flowers.

== Description ==
Penstemon watsonii is a herbaceous plant that may grow 25 to 65 centimeters tall. Its slightly hairy or occasionally smooth stems may grow outwards a short distance and then curve to grow upwards or grow straight up from the base of the plant. The stems sprout from a caudex that branches frequently. Among penstemons is it a relatively long lived plant.

On Penstemon watsonii basal leaves, ones that sprout from the base of the plant, are absent or poorly developed. The cauline leaves, attached to the stems, grow in pairs with four to eight pairs on each stem. They only have very short petioles, leaf stems, or have their bases attached directly the main stems. Higher up on the stem the base of the leaves clasp the stem. The length of leaves is usually between 30 and 70 millimeters, but they may be as long as 80 mm or as short as 13 mm. Their width varies between 8 and 35 mm and their shape may also range between oblanceolate, reversed spear head shaped, and lanceolate, spear head shaped with the wider portion towards the base rather than the tip of the leaf.

The inflorescence has flowers that are somewhat dense to grouped in clusters. Each cluster having two attachment points on opposite sides of the stem, usually with three to seven flowers each, but occasionally as many as ten. The funnel shaped flower is 12 to 18 mm long and may be blue to purple or violet in color with red-purple nectar guides. They are smooth on the outside and have sparse white hairs inside the floral tube. The staminode is 8 to 9 mm long and reaches the opening of the flower, but does not extend beyond it. It is covered in 1 mm long golden yellow hairs.

== Taxonomy ==
The scientific description of Penstemon watsonii was published by Asa Gray in 1878. In 1906 the botanist Edward Lee Greene described a species he named Penstemon phlogifolius that is now regarded as a heterotypic synonym of P. watsonii.

== Range and habitat ==
Penstemon watsonii grows in the central part of the Intermountain West of the United States. It grows in western Colorado, most of Utah, much of eastern Nevada, and some parts of southern Idaho. It is only known to grow in Mohave County in Arizona. It was also only found in Uinta County, Wyoming in the far southwestern corner of the state, but NatureServe lists it as probably locally extinct in that state.

This species grows on gravelly or rocky soils. The elevation range is between 1700 and 3200 meters. They are associated with sagebrush steppe, pine-oak woodlands, and pine woodlands with an open character.

== See also ==
List of Penstemon species
