= Honey guide =

Honey guide may refer to:

- Honeyguide, a bird, of which some species will lead humans to bee colonies
- Nectar guide, or honey guide, a marking in some flowers that guides pollinators to their rewards
