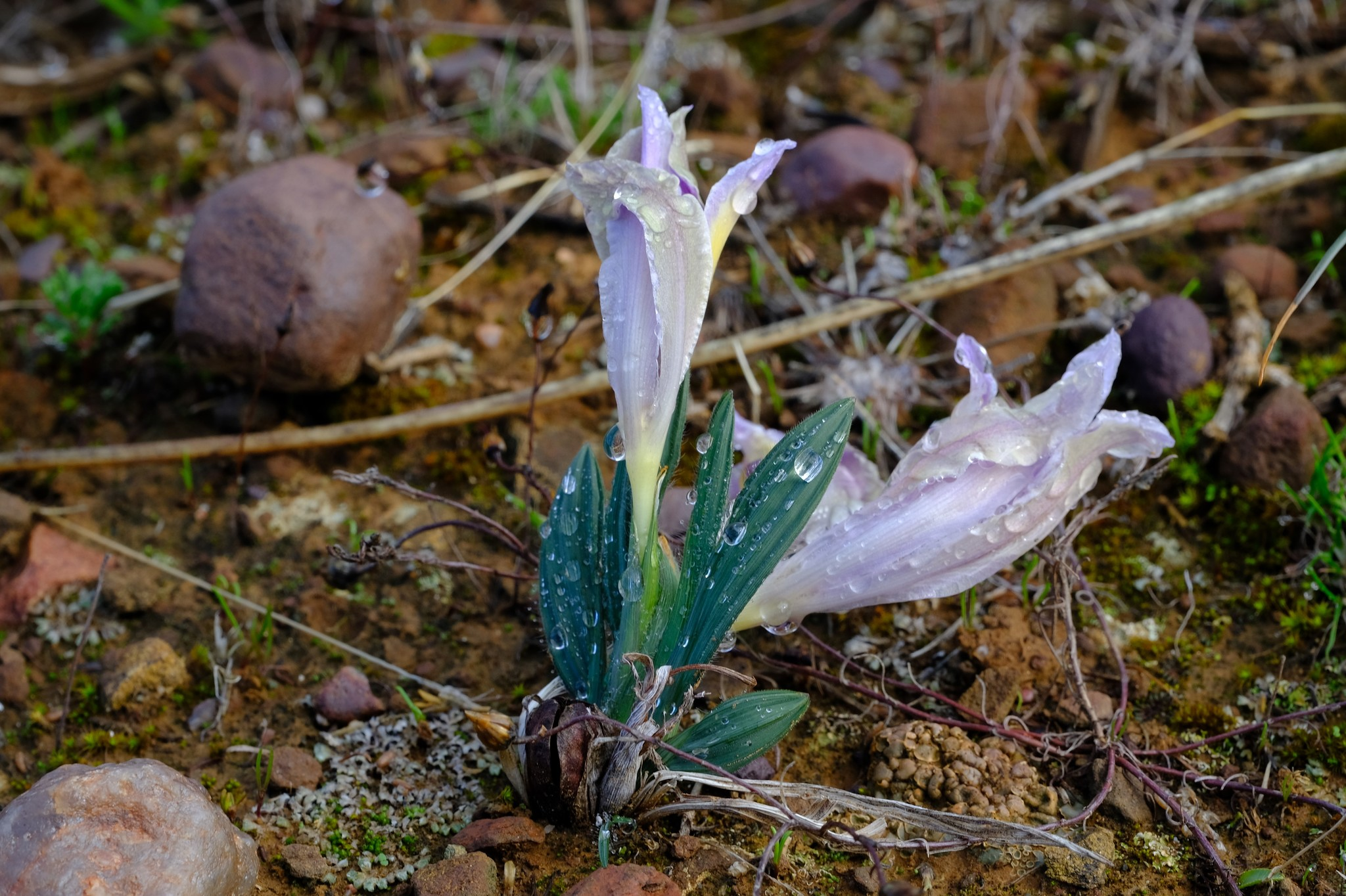

Conservation status
- Vulnerable (SANBI Red List)

Scientific classification
- Kingdom: Plantae
- Clade: Tracheophytes
- Clade: Angiosperms
- Clade: Monocots
- Order: Asparagales
- Family: Iridaceae
- Genus: Babiana
- Species: B. pauciflora

Binomial name
- Babiana pauciflora G.J.Lewis

= Babiana pauciflora =

Species of flowering plant

Babiana pauciflora is a perennial flowering plant of up to 10 cm (3.9 in) that is assigned to the Iridaceae family. The species is endemic to the Northern Cape and the Western Cape. It occurs on the Bokkeveld Mountains escarpment where it grows in the vegetation type called renosterveld. The species has lost habitat to wheat cultivation in the past; currently, the cultivation of olives and grain products is a threat. The plants on the road shoulders are also threatened by maintenance.

== Description ==
Babiana pauciflora is a plant of up to 10 cm (3.9 in). Like most Babiana species it has a globe-shaped corm underground that roots below. It has a short unbranched stem at an inclined angle which is enclosed by a fibrous collar at its base. It has oblong lance-shaped leaves that are somewhat pleated at their bases and carry hairs on the veins. Each flower is subtended by two conspicuously sized opposing green bracts, both of 35–55 mm (1.4–2.2 in) long. The inner bract is forked at the tip and has two distinct keels. The 2-4 mirror-symmetric, violet flowers emit a sweet rose scent, and are crowded on a short, more or less upright spike. The lower lateral tepals are marked with bright yellow blotches rimmed by a lilac-coloured edge. The six tepals are merged into a perianth tube that is cylindrical at base and funnel-shaped higher up, with a length of 35–45 mm (1.4–1.8 in) and ending in separate lobes. These tepal lobes are uneaqual in shape and size. The tepal at the side of the inner bract is 40–50 mm (1.6–2.0 in) long. The lower tepals at the side of the outer bract are 25–40 mm (0.98–1.57 in) long and merged a little higher up that the dorsal tepal. The three stamens are clustered close to the dorsal tepal and consist of curved filaments of about 15 mm (0.59 in) long topped by anthers of about 6 mm (0.24 in). The ovary is hairless and topped by the style that splits at the top of the anthers in three branches with widened tips. Flowering occurs in June.

== Taxonomy ==
This species of bobbejaantjie was first scientifically described by Gwendoline Joyce Lewis in 1959.

== Distribution, ecology and conservation ==
Babiana pauciflora is not uncommon south of Nieuwoudtville towards Botterkloof in stony clay. The species has an area of occupancy of 36 km^{2} divided over four or five locations. Habitat has been lost to land development for wheat cultivation but the decline has now been halted. Potentially, land development for olive orchards, cereal cultivation and clearing of road sides may threaten the species in the future. It is therefore considered vulnerable.
