= Pollinator-mediated selection =

Process in which pollinators effects a plant's evolution

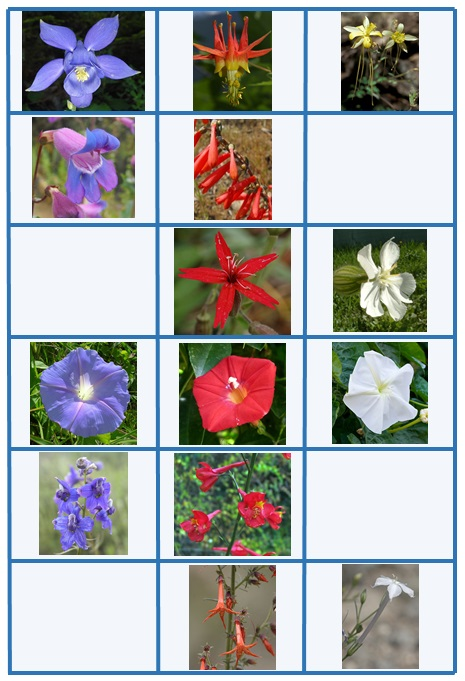
Evolution of multiple pollination syndromes. The columns from left to right are examples of bee, hummingbird and moth-pollination syndromes. Each row shows representatives of the same genus. The top row are columbines (Ranunculaceae). The second row are beardtongues (Plantagineaceae). Third row are catchfly (Caryophylaceae). The fourth row are morning glories (Convolvulaceae). The fifth row are larkspurs (Ranunculaceae) and the last row are gilias (Polemoniaceae). Photos by Stickpen, Walter Siegmund, Cstubben, Lionnel, Derek Ramsey, Jebulon, Dinkum, Forest & Kim Starr, S . Zenner, and Jerry Friedman.

Pollinator-mediated selection is an evolutionary process occurring in flowering plants, in which the foraging behavior of pollinators differentially selects for certain floral traits. Flowering plant are a diverse group of plants that produce seeds. Their seeds differ from those of gymnosperms in that they are enclosed within a fruit. These plants display a wide range of diversity when it comes to the phenotypic characteristics of their flowers, which attracts a variety of pollinators that participate in biotic interactions with the plant. Since many plants rely on pollen vectors, their interactions with them influence floral traits and also favor efficiency since many vectors are searching for floral rewards like pollen and nectar. Examples of pollinator-mediated selected traits could be those involving the size, shape, color and odor of flowers, corolla tube length and width, size of inflorescence, floral rewards and amount, nectar guides, and phenology. Since these types of traits are likely to be involved in attracting pollinators, they may very well be the result of selection by the pollinators themselves.

Having a floral display that either attracts a variety of pollinators or is efficient in the exchanges that occur during pollination can have advantages for the reproductive success of plants. Thus, pollinator behavior is important to understand in relation to the evolution of flowering plants and in some cases pollinator behavior is thought to lead to specialized pollination syndromes where floral traits have co-evolved with their pollinators in a way that are a direct response to the selection occurring from their pollen vectors. However, many flowering plants don't display morphology that excludes all pollinators except the one they co-evolved with. The most effective pollinator principle posits that floral traits reflect the adaptation to the pollinator that is efficient at transferring the most pollen. Selection might actually favor some degree of generalization while some flowers can also retain particular traits that allow them to adapt to a certain type of pollinator, but will ultimately be molded by the pollinators that are the most effective and visit the most frequently. This leads to shifts in pollination syndromes and to some genera having a high diversity of pollination syndromes among species, suggesting that pollinators are a primary selective force driving diversity and speciation.

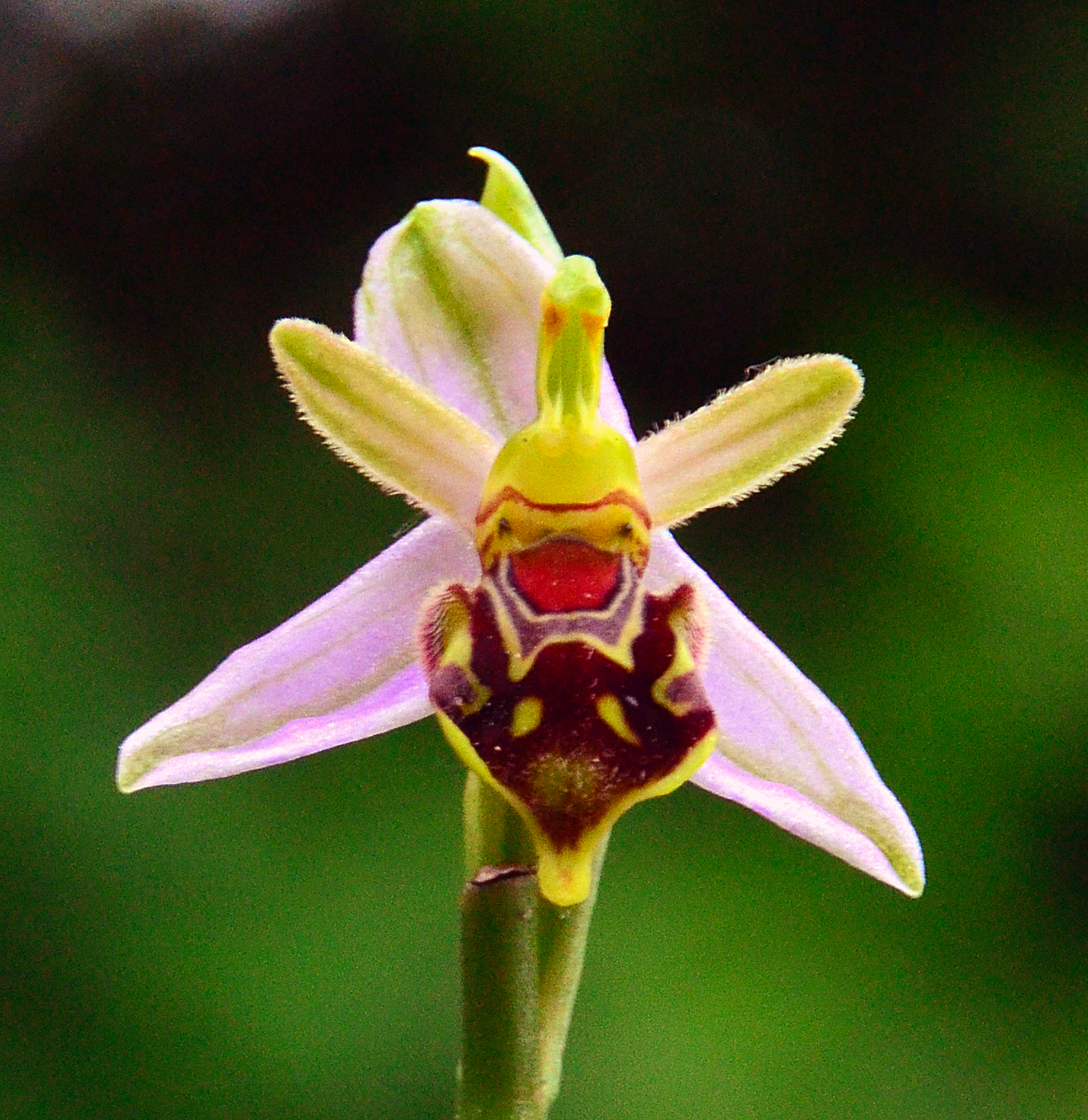
Ophrys apifera is an orchid species that has a highly evolved plant-pollinator relationship. This specific species displays sexual deception and floral mimicry that have resulted from the selection pressures of bees.

Pollinator-mediated selection requires isolation and therefore cannot function in sympatry. Floral isolation is a consequence of pollinator behavior that reduces inter-lineage pollen transfer, which reduces gene flow and increases the possibility for a transition to different syndromes. Isolation with no gene flow between populations allows for the development of distinct species, thus speciation is a result of reproductive isolation and can be driven by pollinator-mediated selection.

== See also ==
- Fertilisation of Orchids (1862)
- Pollination
- Pollination syndrome
- Floral biology
- Flower constancy
