= Federico Delpino =

Italian scientist (1833–1905)

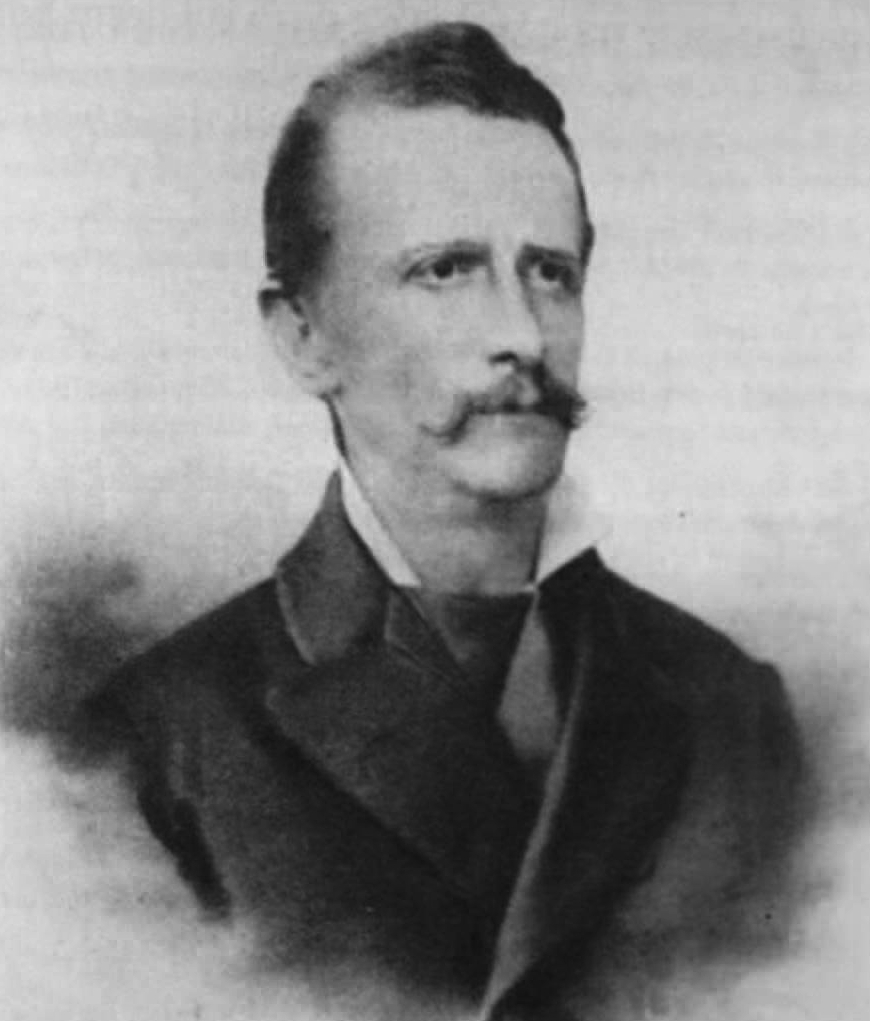
- Born: 27 December 1833; Chiavari, Liguria, Duchy of Savoy and Kingdom of Sardinia
- Died: 14 May 1905 (aged 71); Naples, Kingdom of Italy
- Scientific career
- Fields: Botany

Giacomo Giuseppe Federico Delpino (27 December 1833 – 14 May 1905) was an Italian botanist who made early observations on floral biology, particularly the pollination of flowers by insects. Delpino introduced a very broad view of plant ecology and was the first to suggest pollination syndromes, sets of traits associated with specific kinds of pollinators. He wrote Pensieri sulla Biologia Vegetale (Thoughts on Plant Biology) in 1867 and this failed to gather sufficient notice due to it being written in Italian. He corresponded with Charles Darwin and was one of the first to speculate on the idea of "plant intelligence".

== Life and career ==
Delpino was born in Chiavari, the first child of Enrico Delpino and Carlotta Enrico. He was baptized by Antonio Maria Gianelli, who was then a priest in the parish of St. John the Baptist. As a child, Delpino was forced to spend long hours in the garden to improve his strength. Delpino later recollected that he became a naturalist because of this - "What could a child do who was left to himself for so many hours in complete solitude? I spent all my time studying the habits of ants, bees and wasps. I discovered the curious nesting habit of a large black bee (Xylocopa violacea)."

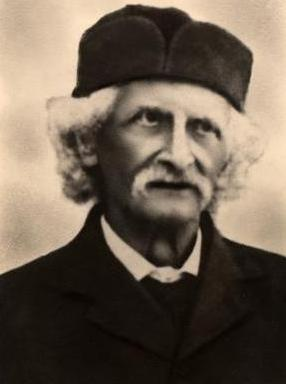
Portrait from the late 1800s

Delpino's early studies after high school were in mathematics and natural sciences at Genoa but he had to drop out in 1850 upon his father's death. Economic worries forced him to seek work and he became an official in the Customs House of Chiavari and later made botanical trips to Constantinople and Odessa. He moved in 1867 to Florence to assist Filippo Parlatore, In 1871 he was appointed as professor of natural history at the Forestry School in the Royal Institute of Vallombrosa. In 1875, he moved to the University of Genoa to head the botany department there. Delpino wished to travel around the world and boarded the warship Garibaldi as a naturalist with the Prince Tommaso di Savoia. He returned, however, after reaching Brazil and travelling around Rio de Janeiro. In 1884 he moved to Bologna and in 1894 to the University of Naples where he stayed until his death.

Delpino was one of the founders of modern floral biology along with Hermann Müller and corresponded with Charles Darwin from 1867 onwards. Delpino looked at the interactions of plants and the environment and the results in terms of physiology and structure of the plants. One of Delpino's pioneering researches was in the evolution of plant relationships with ants. This research was prompted by a dispute with Darwin on the function of extra-floral nectaries. According to Darwin, these were excretory in function. Delpino noted that the nectaries provided sweet substances and observed that ants provided defence to many of these plants and identified nearly 80 plants with ant associations. Darwin unfortunately could not read many of his works in Italian and was only able to examine some parts with the help of his wife. Delpino was also a keen observer of plant growth and behaviour and in his studies he examined the definition of intelligence and noted that the denial of intelligence to plants was a "serious mistake, born of a superficial appreciation of the facts. The solutions implemented by plants, in fact are successful in achieving the same results of animal locomotion and with the same perfection. In this I do not see any difference in the degrees of intelligence exhibited by animals and plants." In 1869 Delpino criticised Darwin's theory of pangenesis, to which Darwin responded.

Delpino believed in a teleological and vitalist interpretation of evolution. He has been described as trying to "reconcile Darwin's theory of evolution with a spiritual finalism." His thought process was teleological and assumed that nature had a purpose. Giovanni Canestrini described Delpino as a "Darwinian fully displayed" but was embarrassed about his belief in vitalism.

Delpino pioneered the concept of pollination syndrome and believed that flower biology could assist in taxonomy. In his Handbuch der Blütenbiologie (1898–1904), Paul Knuth, considered Delpino as one of the four pillars of support for Darwin's work on plant pollination.

In 1891, botanist Carl Ernst Otto Kuntze circumscribed Delpinoina, which is a genus of fungi within the Ascodichaenaceae family and named in Federico Delpino's honour.

In 1903, a plant (and monotypic genus of Delpinophytum) from South America, with sole species of Delpinophytum patagonicum was named after him. It was published and described in Anales Mus. Nac. Buenos Aires Vol.9 on page 9 in 1903.

== Scientific works ==
- Delpino F (1867) Sugli apparecchi della fecondazione nelle piante antocarpee.
- Delpino F (1868) Ulteriori osservazioni sulla dicogamia nel regno vegetale.
- Delpino, F (1869) Sulla darwiniana teoria della pangenesi. Rivista Contemporanea LVI: 196-204 & LVII: 25-38.
- Delpino F (1874) Ulteriori osservazioni e considerazioni sulla dicogamia nel regno vegetale. 2 (IV). Delle piante zooifile. Atti. Soc. Ital. Sci. Nat. 16:151–349.
