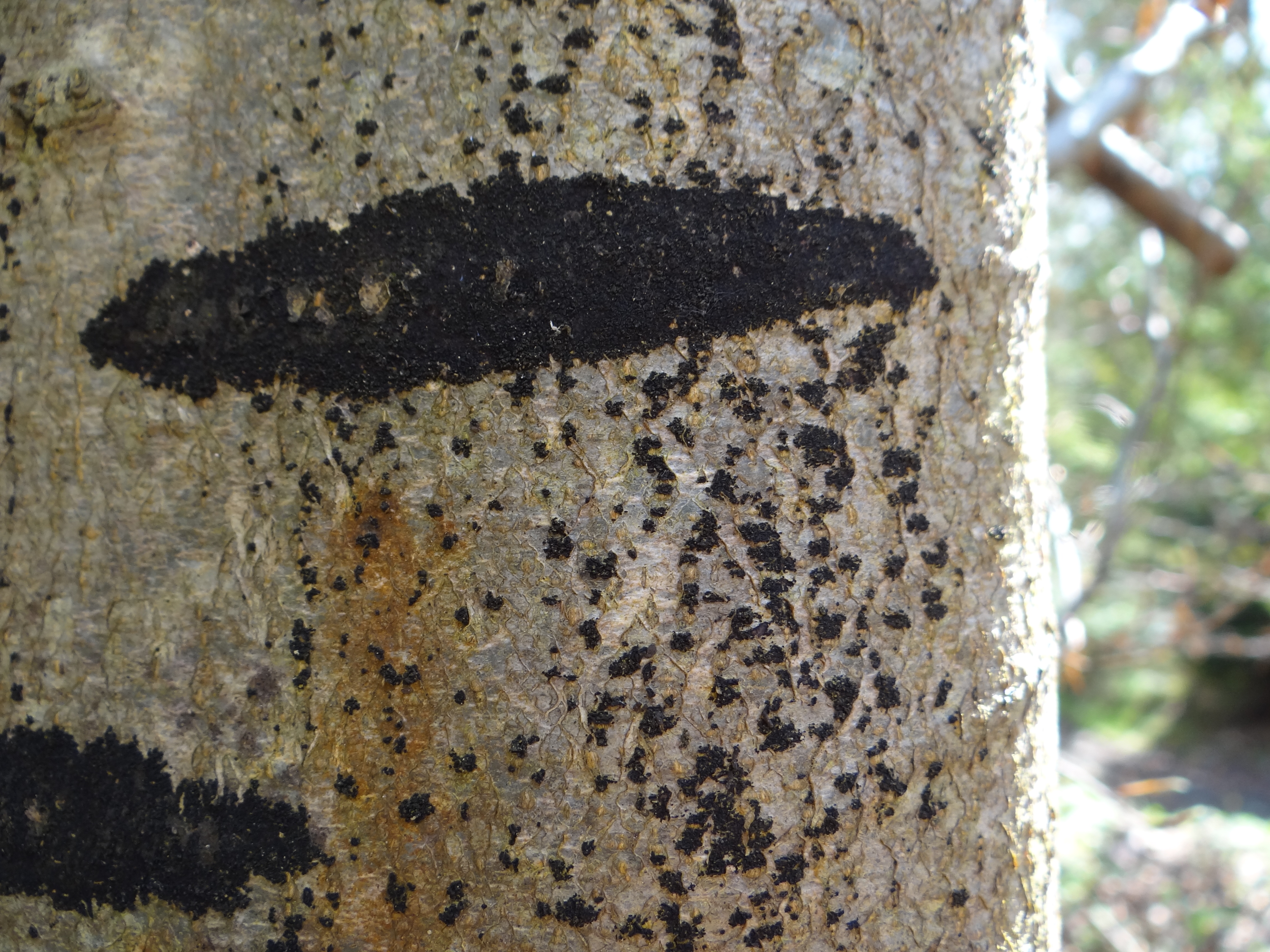
- Ascodichaena rugosa on European beech in Poland

Scientific classification
- Kingdom: Fungi
- Division: Ascomycota
- Class: Leotiomycetes
- Order: Rhytismatales
- Family: Ascodichaenaceae
- Genus: Ascodichaena
- Species: A. rugosa

Binomial name
- Ascodichaena rugosa Butin (1977)

Synonyms
- Lichen rugosum L. (1753)

= Ascodichaena rugosa =

Species of lichen

Ascodichaena rugosa is a species of fungus in the family Ascodichaenaceae. It was first scientifically described as a new species by Carl Linnaeus in 1753 as Lichen rugosum. Heinz Butin transferred it to the newly circumscribed genus Ascodichaena in 1977, in which it is the type species.
