= Delpinophytum =

Scientific classification
- Kingdom: Plantae
- Clade: Tracheophytes
- Clade: Angiosperms
- Clade: Eudicots
- Clade: Rosids
- Order: Brassicales
- Family: Brassicaceae
- Genus: Delpinophytum; Speg.
- Species: D. patagonicum

Binomial name
- Delpinophytum patagonicum (Speg.) Speg.

Synonyms
- Delpinoella Speg.; Coronopus patagonicus (Speg.) Muschl.; Delpinoella patagonica Speg.

Genus of plants

Delpinophytum is a monotypic genus of flowering plants belonging to the family Brassicaceae, with one species, Delpinophytum patagonicum, a subshrub native to southern Argentina.

The species was first described as Delpinoella patagonica by Carlo Luigi Spegazzini in 1902. The genus was named after Italian botanist Federico Delpino (1833–1905), then published and described in Anales Mus. Nac. Buenos Aires Vol.9 on page 9 in 1903.
