= Pseudophacidium =

Scientific classification
- Kingdom: Fungi
- Division: Ascomycota
- Class: Leotiomycetes
- Order: Rhytismatales
- Family: Ascodichaenaceae
- Genus: Pseudophacidium; P. Karst.

Type species
- Pseudophacidium ledi (Alb. & Schwein.) P. Karst.

Genus of fungi

Pseudophacidium is a genus of fungi within the Ascodichaenaceae family.
