= Delpinoina =

Scientific classification
- Kingdom: Fungi
- Division: Ascomycota
- Class: Leotiomycetes
- Order: Rhytismatales
- Family: Ascodichaenaceae
- Genus: Delpinoina; Kuntze

Type species
- Delpinoina lusitanica (Pass. & Thüm.) Kuntze

Genus of fungi

Delpinoina is a genus of fungi within the Ascodichaenaceae family.

The genus name of Delpinoina is in honour of Giacomo Giuseppe Federico Delpino (1833 – 1905), who was an Italian botanist who made early observations on floral biology, particularly the pollination of flowers by insects.

The genus was circumscribed by Carl Ernst Otto Kuntze in Rev. Gen. Pl. Vol.2 on page 851 in 1891.
