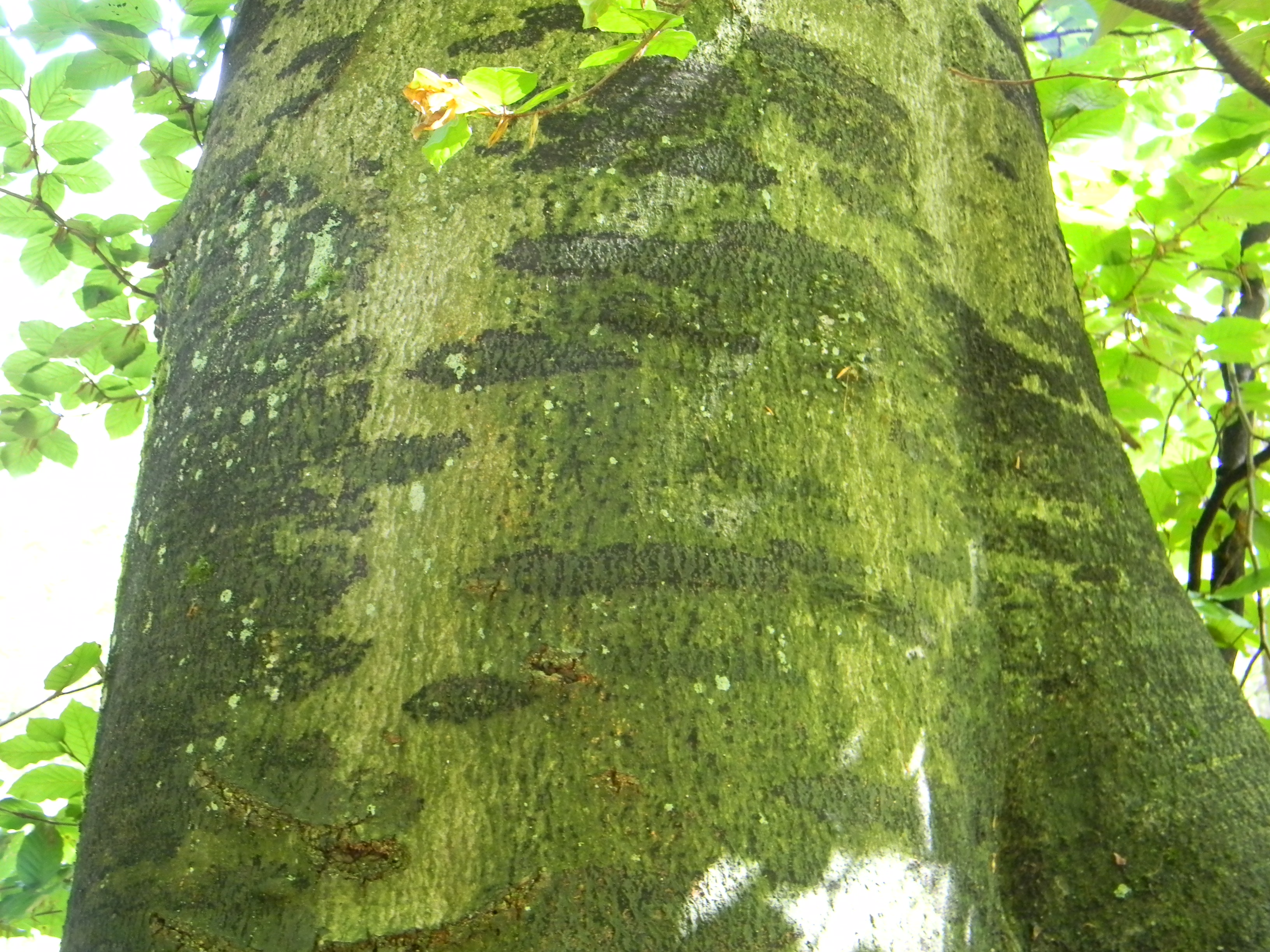
- Ascodichaena rugosa

Scientific classification
- Kingdom: Fungi
- Division: Ascomycota
- Class: Leotiomycetes
- Order: Rhytismatales
- Family: Ascodichaenaceae
- Genus: Ascodichaena; Butin (1977)

Type species
- Ascodichaena rugosa Butin (1977)

Species
- A. mexicana A. rugosa

= Ascodichaena =

Genus of fungi

Ascodichaena is a genus of fungi in the family Ascodichaenaceae. The genus was circumscribed in 1977.

== Species ==
According to Index Fungorum, the genus contains two species (as of February 2022):

Species	Author(s)	Year of publication
Ascodichaena mexicana	Butin & Marm.	1990
Ascodichaena rugosa (Ascodichaena rugosa)	Butin	1977
