= Flower constancy =

Tendency to visit certain flower species

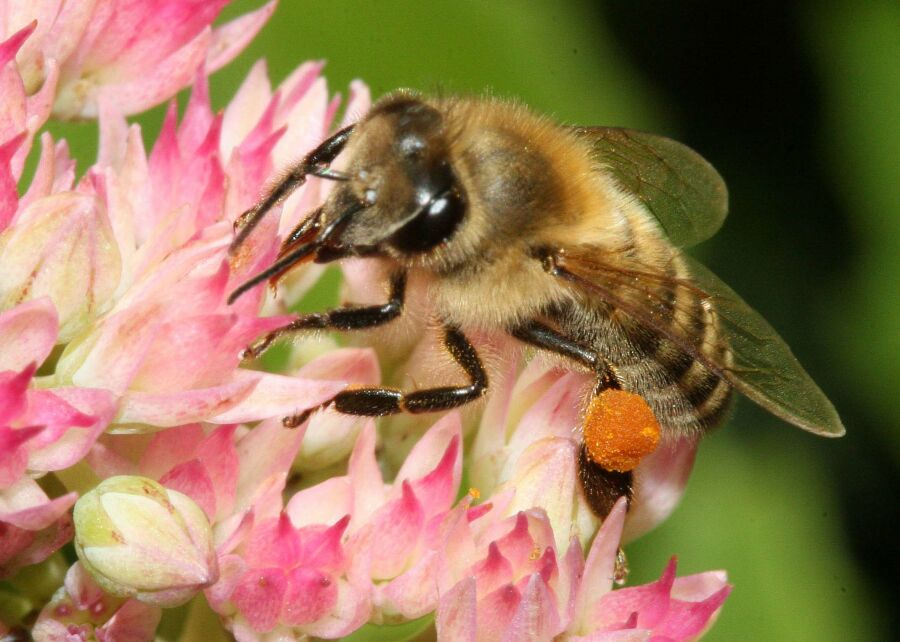

Flower constancy or pollinator constancy is a behavior of pollinators wherein an individual exclusively visits a single flower species or morph to the exclusion of other flowers from which it could obtain resources. Constancy is distinct from specialization, where the pollinator is evolved such that it can only derive resources from a few species. Constancy is also not a fixed preference; the same individual may exhibit constancy for different flowers on different bouts of foraging. This type of foraging behavior puts selective pressures on floral traits in a process called pollinator-mediated selection. Flower constancy is different from other types of insect specialization such as innate preferences for certain colors or flower types or focusing foraging effort on the most rewarding flowers.

Flower constancy has been observed for insect pollinators: especially honeybees (Apis mellifera), a bumblebee (Bombus terrestris), and a butterfly (Thymelicus sylvestris). For example, honeybees have demonstrated a preference for certain flower types and constantly return even if other more rewarding flowers are available. This is shown for example in experiments where honeybees remain flower constant and do not attempt to feed on other available flowers that exhibit an alternative color to their preferred flower type.

== Adaptive behavior ==
Flower constancy favors flower pollination, that is, pollinators that are flower constant are more likely to transfer pollen to other conspecific plants. Also, flower constancy prevents the loss of pollen during interspecific flights and pollinators from clogging stigmas with pollen of other flower species. Flower constancy can be enhanced when the flowers are more dissimilar, for example in their coloration. When, in a community of flowering plants, the flowers are all similarly colored, the constancy is often lower because different species are more difficult to distinguish, whereas constancy tends to be higher when the flowers are distinctly differently colored.

Flower constancy benefits flower pollination but, arguably, constancy is not so obviously adaptive for pollinators. Individuals that show constant behavior ignore other flowers that could potentially provide more nectar (reward) than their preferred type. As a result, flower constancy seems to contradict optimal foraging models, which assume that animals will move minimal distances between food resources and so will feed on a mixture of these to maximize their energy intake per unit time. As a result of this apparent contradiction, many hypotheses have been proposed to explain flower constancy in insects to determine the adaptability of flower constancy. One of the most popular explanations is that insects that are flower constant have limited memory space and can only focus on one flower type at a time.

== Hypotheses ==
=== Memory limitation ===
Insects, as with other animals, have short-term memory or "working memory" where information is stored temporarily for a few seconds or minutes. Additionally, insects have long-term memory or "reference memory", which stores information for hours or more. One of the most widespread explanations for flower constancy is that insects can only identify and handle one flower type or species at a time. Conversely, other scientists argue that insects such as bees can store large amounts of information (location of nest, flower patches, and existence of surrounding landmarks) in their long-term memory.

=== Learning investment ===
The learning investment hypothesis relates to the ability of an insect to learn a motor skill to handle and obtain nectar from a flower type or species. Learning these motor skills could require substantial investment; switching to other flower types or species could be inefficient and consequently non-adaptive. Concentrating and feeding on one particular flower type would then increase the insect's efficiency of obtaining nectar.

=== Costly information ===
The costly information hypothesis explains flower constancy by supposing that insects stay constant to a one flower type because they know they are obtaining a reliable reward: nectar. The insect does not venture to feed on other flower types because it cannot predict the amount of nectar in other flowers, and could waste foraging time probing less productive types of flower.

=== Resource-partitioning ===
In social foragers, flower constancy could benefit the colony in that foragers avoid competition by specializing on a specific flower type. In this case, an individual insect, for example a bee, becomes flower constant to avoid competition and thus increase its foraging efficiency.
