= Floral isolation =

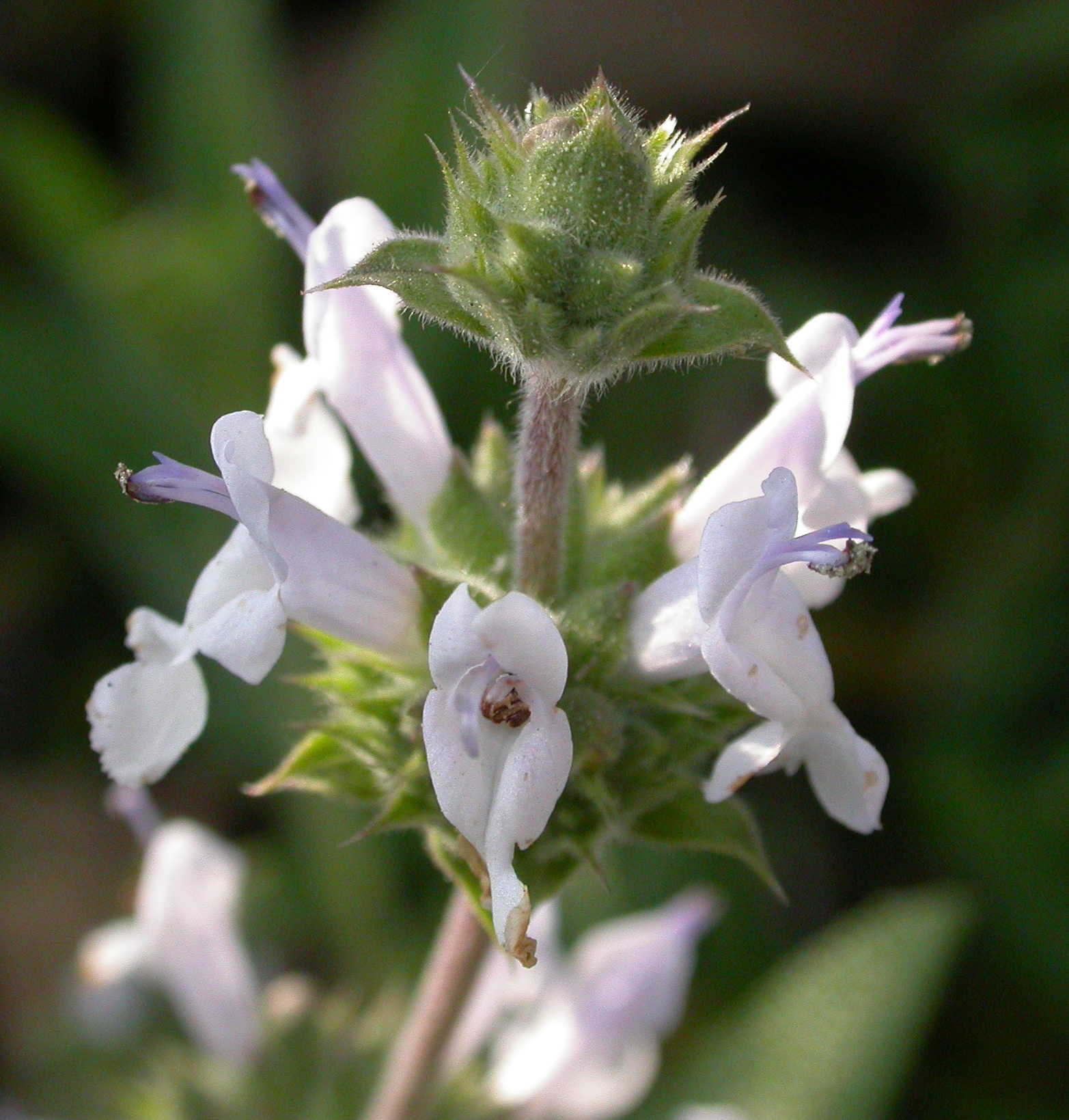
An example of morphological isolation in Salvia mellifera where the stigma and anther positioning determines the location of pollen contact on the bumblebee, promoting transfer within the species.

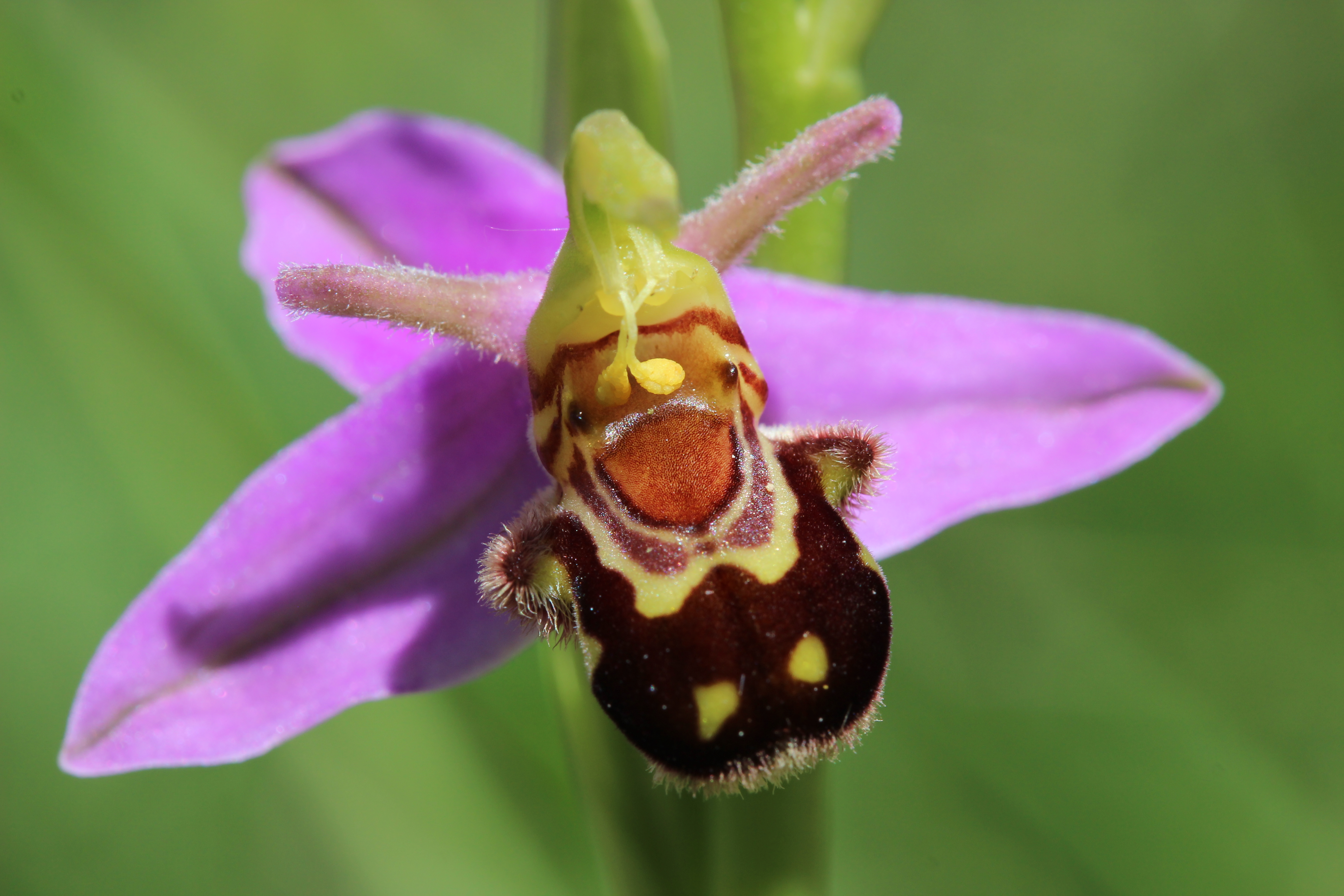
An example of ethological isolation in Ophrys apifera where the orchids structure mimics that of a female bee to attract the male counterparts.

Floral Isolation is a form of reproductive isolation found in angiosperms. Reproductive isolation is the process of species evolving mechanisms to prevent reproduction with other species. In plants, this is accomplished through the manipulation of the pollinator’s behavior (ethological isolation) or through morphological characteristics of flowers that favor intraspecific pollen transfer (morphological isolation). Preventing interbreeding prevents hybridization and gene flow between the species (introgression), and consequently protects the genetic integrity of the species. Reproductive isolation occurs in many organisms, and floral isolation is one form present in plants. Floral isolation occurs prior to pollination, and is divided into two types of isolation: morphological isolation and ethological isolation. Floral isolation was championed by Verne Grant in the 1900s as an important mechanism of reproductive isolation in plants.

== Morphological Isolation ==
Mechanical or morphological isolation is a form of floral isolation where the characteristics of the flower prevent reproduction between species. These morphological differences primarily affect the positioning of reproductive structures within flowers and control the placement of pollen on the pollinator’s body to promote transfer within the same species. For example, flowers of Salvia mellifera have anthers and stigmas which are positioned to contact the dorsal surface of the bumblebee abdomen while flowers of the co-occurring Salvia apiana place pollen on the bumblebee’s flanks.

== Ethological Isolation ==
Ethological isolation is a form of floral isolation caused predominantly by the behavior of pollinators. Flowers can have morphological features which attract or reward specific types of pollinators. The relationship between floral signals and pollinators can promote floral constancy, where different pollinators preferentially visit one species over others. The color or odor of flowers promotes this isolation as plants effectively manipulate the behavior of their animal pollinators. An example of this type of manipulation is found in orchids as they mimic female bees and wasps in order to attract male pollinators as a form of sexual deception referred to as pseudocopulation.
