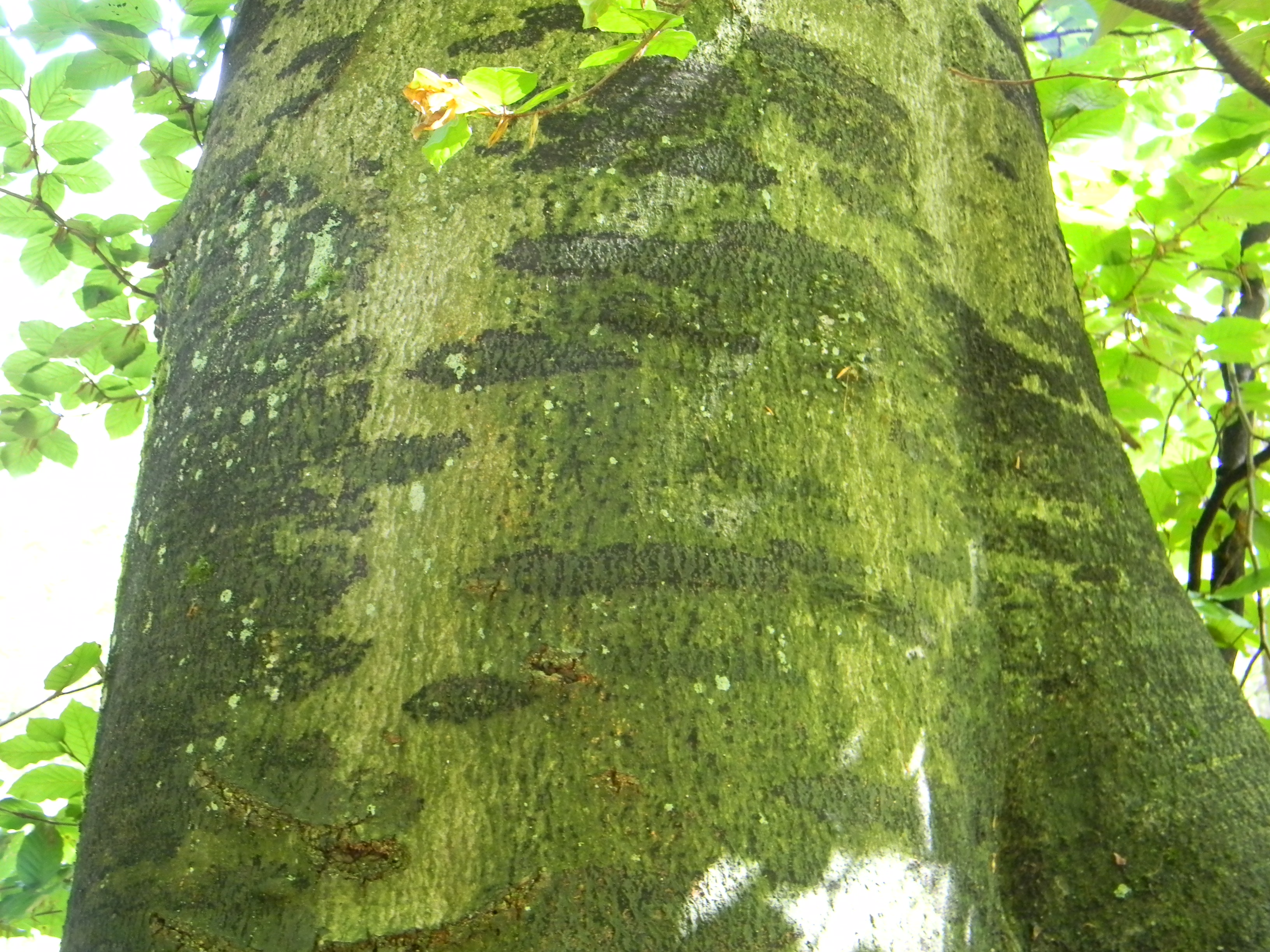
- Ascodichaena rugosa

Scientific classification
- Kingdom: Fungi
- Division: Ascomycota
- Class: Leotiomycetes
- Order: Rhytismatales
- Family: Ascodichaenaceae; D.Hawksw. & Sherwood (1982)

Type genus
- Ascodichaena Butin (1977)

Genera
- Ascodichaena; Delpinoina; Dichaenopsella; Myxophacidium; Pseudophacidium; Psilospora

= Ascodichaenaceae =

Family of fungi

The Ascodichaenaceae are a family of fungi in the order Rhytismatales.
