= Nectar guide =

Flower markings

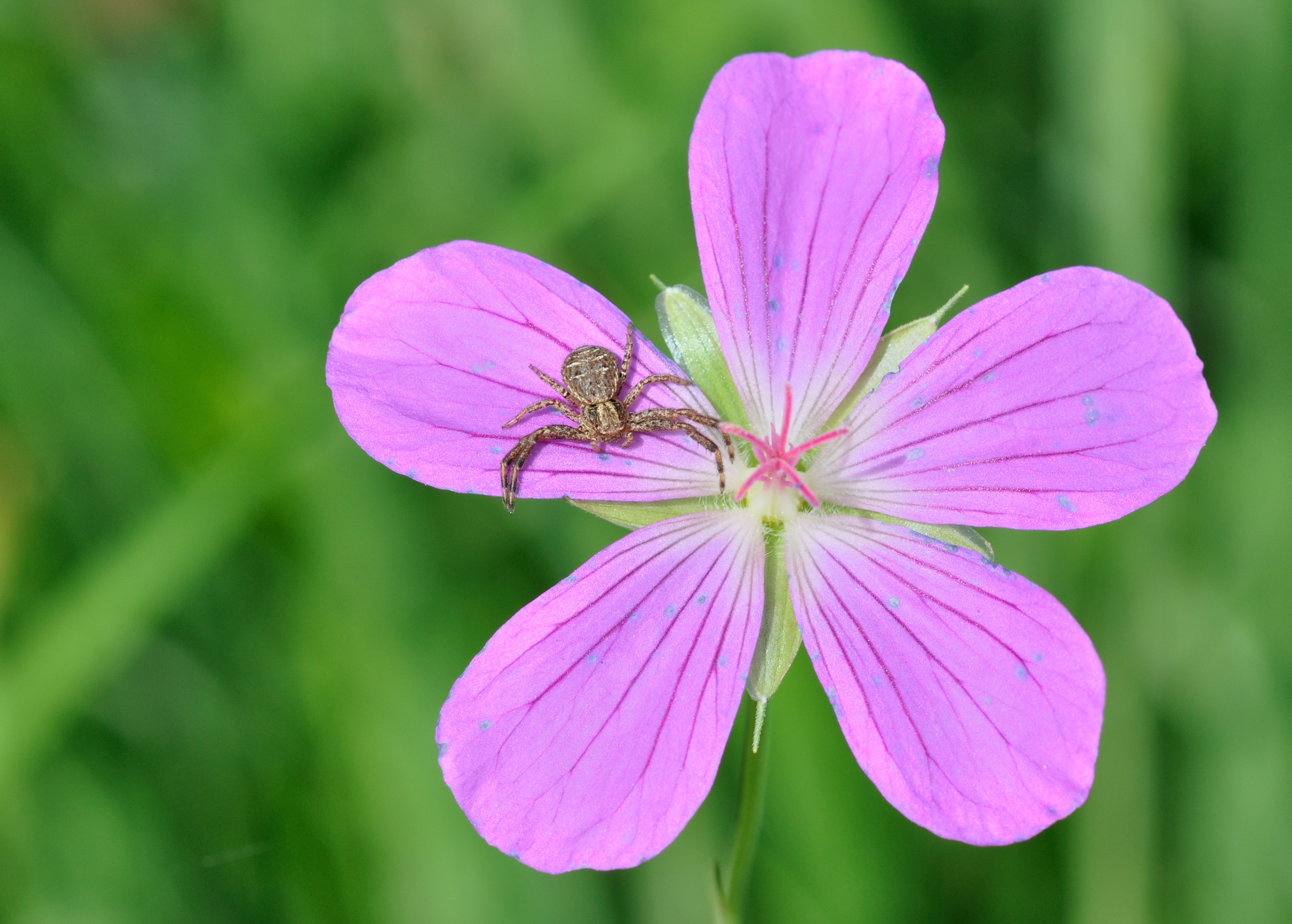
Crab spider (Xysticus sp.) lurking on Marsh Cranesbill (Geranium palustre) with visible nectar guides

Nectar guides are markings or patterns seen in flowers of some angiosperm species, that guide pollinators to their rewards. These markings may appear as lines, spots, or "blotches". Such patterns are also known as "pollen guides" and "honey guides", though some authorities argue for the abandonment of such terms in favour of floral guides (see, for example, Dinkel & Lunau).

== Pollination ==
Nectar guides serve as an interspecific signal that the flower contains a reward. Rewards commonly take the form of nectar, pollen, or both; however, plants may also produce oil, resins, scents, or waxes. Pollinator visitation can select for various floral traits, including nectar guides, through a process called pollinator-mediated selection. For example, nectar guides are thought to increase pollinator foraging efficiency by reducing handling time. These guides may also decrease nectar robbing, which leads more pollen to be transferred and ultimately increases plant fitness.

== Visibility ==
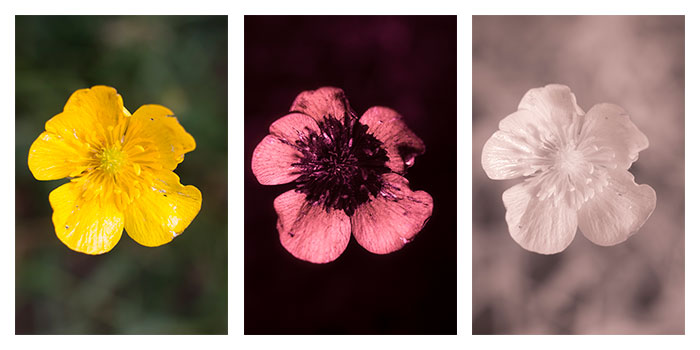
Images of Meadow buttercup (Ranunculus acris) under visible light (left), ultraviolet light (center) and infrared (right)

Nectar guides are sometimes visible to humans; for instance, the Dalmatian toadflax (Linaria genistifolia) has yellow flowers with orange nectar guides. However, in some plants, such as the meadow buttercup (pictured to the right), they are visible only when viewed in ultraviolet light. Under ultraviolet, the flowers have a darker center, where the nectaries are located, and often specific patterns upon the petals as well. This is believed to make the flowers more attractive to pollinators such as honey bees and other insects that can see ultraviolet light. This page on butterflies shows an animated comparison of black-eyed Susan (Rudbeckia hirta) flowers in visible and UV light.

The ultraviolet color, invisible to humans, has been referred to as bee violet, and mixtures of greenish (yellow) wavelengths (roughly 540 nm) with ultraviolet are called bee purple by analogy with purple in human vision.
