= Floral scent =

Chemical scents emitted by flowers

Floral scent, or flower scent, is composed of all the volatile organic compounds (VOCs), or aroma compounds, emitted by floral tissue (e.g. flower petals). Other names for floral scent include, aroma, fragrance, floral odour or perfume. Flower scent of most flowering plant species encompasses a diversity of VOCs, sometimes up to several hundred different compounds. The primary functions of floral scent are to deter herbivores and especially folivorous insects (see Plant defense against herbivory), and to attract pollinators. Floral scent is one of the most important communication channels mediating plant-pollinator interactions, along with visual cues (flower color, shape, etc.).

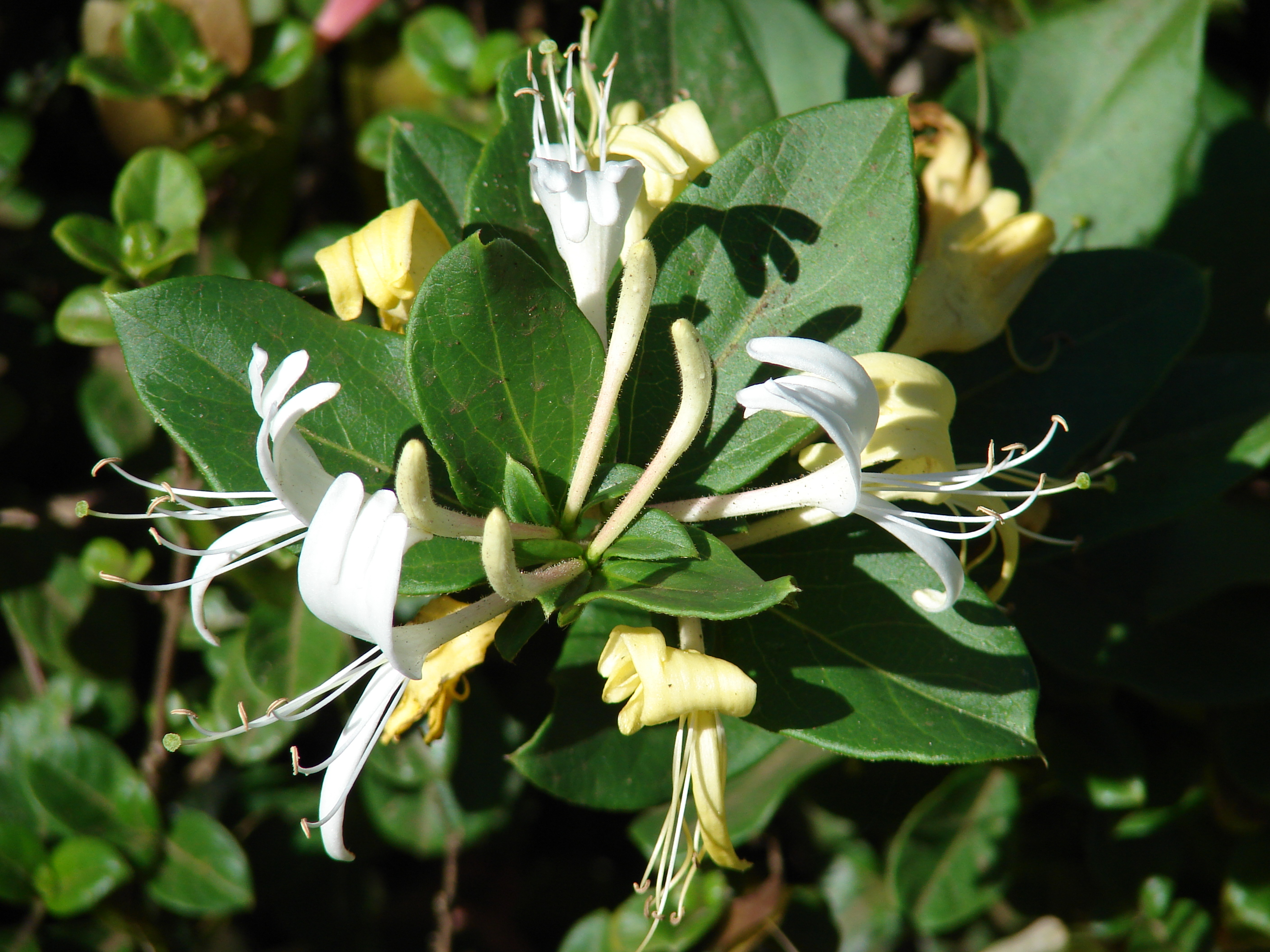
Flowers of Lonicera japonica emit a sweet, subtle fragrance mainly composed of linalool.

== Biotic interactions ==
=== Perception by flower visitors ===
Flower visitors such as insects and bats detect floral scents thanks to chemoreceptors of variable specificity to a specific VOC. The fixation of a VOC on a chemoreceptor triggers the activation of an antennal glomerulus, further projecting on an olfactory receptor neuron and finally triggering a behavioral response after processing the information (see also Olfaction, Insect olfaction). The simultaneous perception of various VOCs may cause the activation of several glomeruli, but the output signal may not be additive due to synergistic or antagonistic mechanisms linked with inter-neuronal activity. Therefore, the perception of a VOC within a floral blend may trigger a different behavioral response than when perceived isolated. Similarly, the output signal is not proportional to the amount of VOCs, with some VOCs in low amounts in the floral blend having major effects on pollinator behavior. A good characterization of floral scent, both qualitative and quantitative, is necessary to understand and potentially predict flower visitors' behavior.

Flower visitors use floral scents to detect, recognize and locate their host species and even discriminate among flowers of the same plant. This is made possible by the high specificity of floral scent, where both diversity of VOCs and their relative amount may characterize the flowering species, an individual plant, a flower of the plant, and the distance of the plume from the source.

To make the best use of this specific information, flower visitors rely on long-term and short-term memory that allows them to efficiently choose their flowers. They learn to associate the floral scent of a plant with a reward such as nectar and pollen, and have different behavioral responses to known scents versus unknown ones. They are also able to react similarly to slightly different odor blends.

=== Mediated biotic interactions ===
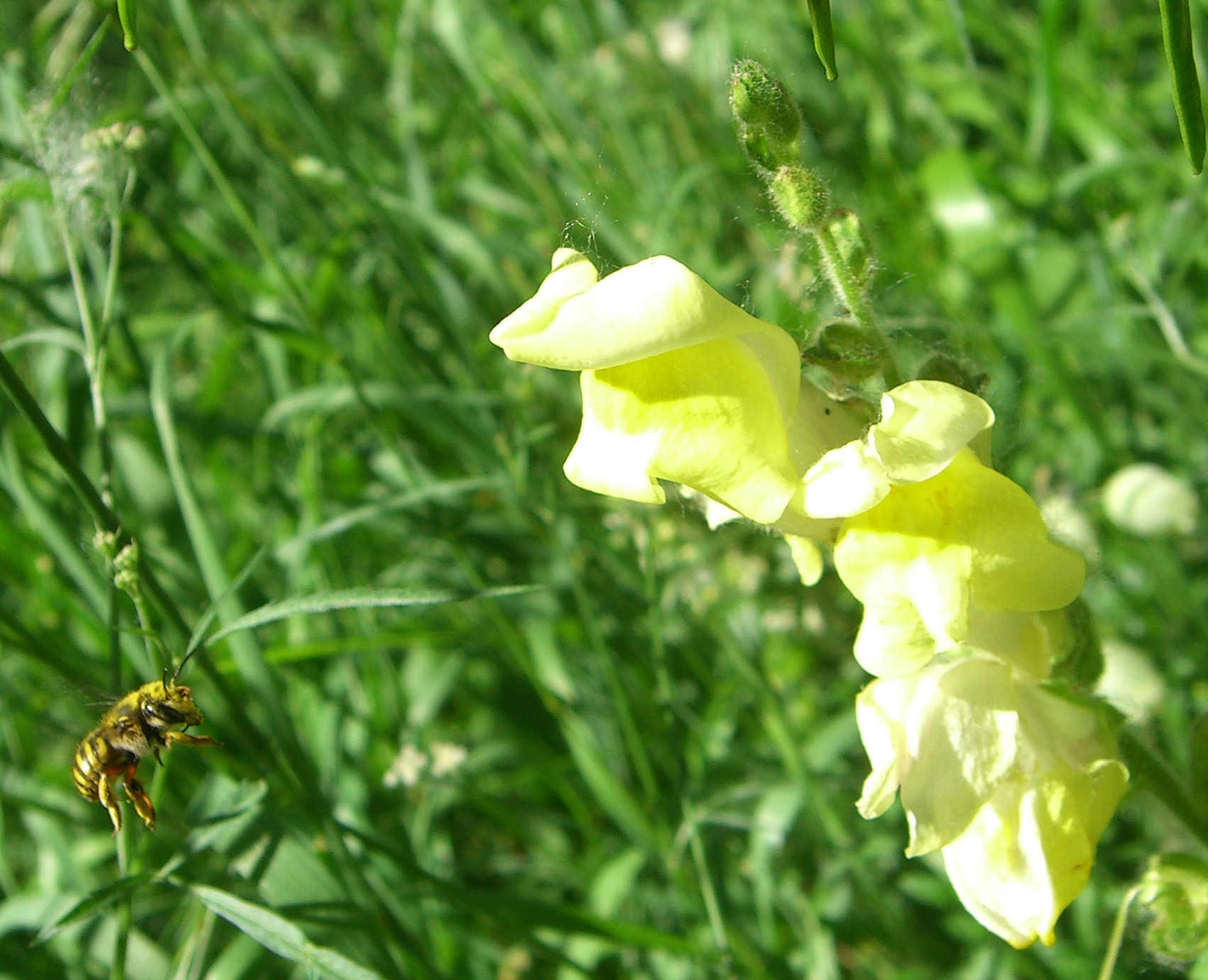
Pollinators use both floral scent and floral colour to locate flowers of Antirrhinum majus spp. striatum.

A primary function of floral scent is to attract pollinators and ensure the reproduction of animal-pollinated plants.

Some families of VOCs presented in floral scents have likely evolved as herbivore repellents. However, these plant defenses are also used by herbivores themselves to locate a plant resource, similar to pollinators attracted by the floral scent. Therefore, flower traits can be subject to antagonistic selection pressures (positive selection by pollinators and negative selection by herbivores).

=== Plant-plant communications ===
Plants have an array of volatile compounds they can release to signal other plants. By unleashing these cues, plants learn more about their environment and sufficiently respond. However, there are still many factors about plant scents scientists are still trying to understand. Scientists have studied how many of the volatile compounds released by plants are from a floral source. A study concluded that floral cues are as important as other volatile compounds and are pertinent for plant-to-plant communication. Further research found that plants which receive the floral volatiles have higher fitness than other volatile cues because floral cues are the only compounds released by plants that indicate their kind of mating environment. Plants are able to respond to these mating cues and change adjustable floral phenotypes that can affect plant pollination and mating. Floral volatiles can ward off or attract pollinators/mates all at once. Depending on the number of floral signals released by a plant can control the level of attracting/repelling the plant wants. The composition of floral compounds and the rate of their release are the potential factors that control attraction/repellence. These two elements can be in response to ecological cues like high plant density and temperature. For instance, in sexually deceptive orchids, floral scents emitted after pollination reduce the flower's attractiveness to pollinators. This mechanism acts as a signal to pollinators to visit unpollinated flowers.

Environmental conditions can affect plant communication and signaling. Signal factors include temperature and plant density. Environmentally high temperatures increase the rate of releasing floral compounds, which can increase the amount of signal released and thus its ability to reach more plants. When plant density increases, plant communication increases as well, since plants would be near each other and have signals reach many neighboring plants. This can also increase the signal's reliability and lowering the chance the signal will degrade before it can reach other plants.

== Biosynthesis of floral VOCs ==
Most floral VOCs belong to three main chemical classes. VOCs in the same chemical class are synthesized from a shared precursor, but the biochemical pathway is specific for each VOC and often varies from one plant species to another.

Terpenoids (or isoprenoids) are derived from isoprene and synthesized via the mevalonate pathway or the erythritol phosphate pathway. They represent the majority of floral VOCs and are often the most abundant compounds in floral scent blends.

The second chemical class is composed of the fatty acid derivatives synthesized from acetyl-CoA, most of which are known as green leaf volatiles, because they are also emitted by vegetative parts (i.e.: leaves and stems) of plants, and sometimes higher in abundance than from floral tissue.

The third chemical class is composed of benzenoids/phenylpropanoids, also known as aromatic compounds; they are synthesized from phenylalanine.

== Regulation of emissions ==
Floral scent emissions of most flowering plants vary predictably throughout the day, following a circadian rhythm. This variation is controlled by light intensity. Maximal emissions coincide with peaks of the highest activity of visiting pollinators. For instance, snapdragon flowers, mostly pollinated by bees, have the highest emissions at noon, whereas nocturnally-visited tobacco plants have the highest emissions at night.

Floral scent emissions also vary along with floral development, with the highest emissions at anthesis, i.e. when the flower is fecund (highly fertile), and reduced emissions after pollination, probably due to mechanisms linked with fecundation. In tropical orchids, floral scent emission is terminated immediately following pollination, reducing the expenditure of energy on fragrance production. In petunia flowers, ethylene is released to stop the synthesis of benzenoid floral volatiles after successful pollination.

Abiotic factors, such as temperature, atmospheric CO_{2} concentration, hydric stress, and soil nutrient status also impact the regulation of floral scent. For instance, increased temperatures in the environment can increase the emission of VOCs in flowers, potentially altering communication between plants and pollinators.

Finally, biotic interactions may also affect the floral scent. Plant leaves attacked by herbivores emit new VOCs in response to the attack, the so-called herbivore-induced plant volatiles (HIPVs). Similarly, damaged flowers have a modified floral scent compared to undamaged ones. Micro-organisms present in nectar may alter floral scent emissions as well.

== Measurement ==
Measuring floral scent both qualitatively (identification of VOCs) and quantitatively (absolute and/or relative emission of VOCs) requires the use of analytical chemistry techniques. It requires collecting floral VOCs, and then analyzing them.

=== VOCs sampling ===
The most popular methods rely on adsorbing floral VOCs on an adsorbent material such as SPME fibers or cartridges by pumping air sampled around inflorescences through the adsorbent material.

It is also possible to extract chemicals stocked in petals by immersing them in a solvent and then analyze the liquid residue. This is more adapted to the study of heavier organic compounds, and/or VOCs that are stored in floral tissue before being emitted into air.

=== Sample analysis ===
==== Desorption ====
- Thermal desorption: the adsorbent material is flash-heated so that all adsorbed VOCs are carried away from the adsorbent and injected into the separation system. This is how work injectors in gas chromatography machines, which literally volatilize introduced samples. For VOCs adsorbed on bigger amount of adsorbent material such as cartridges, thermal desorption may require the use of a specific machine, a thermal desorber, connected to the separation system.
- Desorption by solvent: VOCs adsorbed on the adsorbent material are carried away by a small quantity of solvent which is volatilized and injected in the separation system. Most commonly used solvents are very volatile molecules, such as methanol, to avoid co-elution with slightly heavier VOCs

==== Separation ====
Gas chromatography (GC) is ideal to separate volatilized VOCs due to their low molecular weight. VOCs are carried by a gas vector (helium) through a chromatographic column (the solid phase) on which they have different affinities, which allows to separate them.

Liquid chromatography may be used for liquid extractions of floral tissue.

==== Detection and identification ====
Separation systems are coupled with a detector, that allows the detection and identification of VOCs based on their molecular weight and chemical properties. The most used system for the analysis of floral scent samples is GC-MS (gas chromatography coupled with mass spectrometry).

==== Quantification ====
Quantification of VOCs is based on the peak area measured on the chromatogram and compared to the peak area of a chemical standard:

- Internal calibration: a known quantity of a specific chemical standard is injected together with the VOCs, the measured area on the chromatogram is proportional to the injected quantity. Because the chemical properties of VOCs alter their affinity to the solid phase (the chromatographic column) and subsequently the peak area on the chromatogram, it is best to use several standards that reflect the best chemical diversity of the floral scent sample. This method allows a more robust comparison among samples.
- External calibration: calibration curves (quantity vs. peak area) are established independently by the injection of a range of quantities of chemical standard. This method is best when the relative and absolute amount of VOCs in floral scent samples varies from sample to sample and from VOC to VOC and when the chemical diversity of VOCs in the sample is high. However, it is more time-consuming and may be a source of errors (e.g. matrix effects due to solvent or very abundant VOCs compared to trace VOCs).

=== Specificity of floral scent analysis ===
Floral scent is often composed of hundreds of VOCs, in very variable proportions. The method used is a tradeoff between accurately detecting quantifying minor compounds and avoiding detector saturation by major compounds. For most analysis methods routinely used, the detection threshold of many VOCs is still higher than the perception threshold of insects, which reduces our capacity to understand plant-insect interactions mediated by floral scent.

Further, the chemical diversity in floral scent samples is challenging. The time of analysis is proportional to the range in molecular weight of VOCs present in the sample, hence a high diversity will increase analysis time. Floral scent may also be composed of very similar molecules, such as isomers and especially enantiomers, which tend to co-elute and then to be very hardly separated. Unambiguously detecting and quantifying them is of importance though, as enantiomers may trigger very different responses in pollinators.
