= Pollination network =

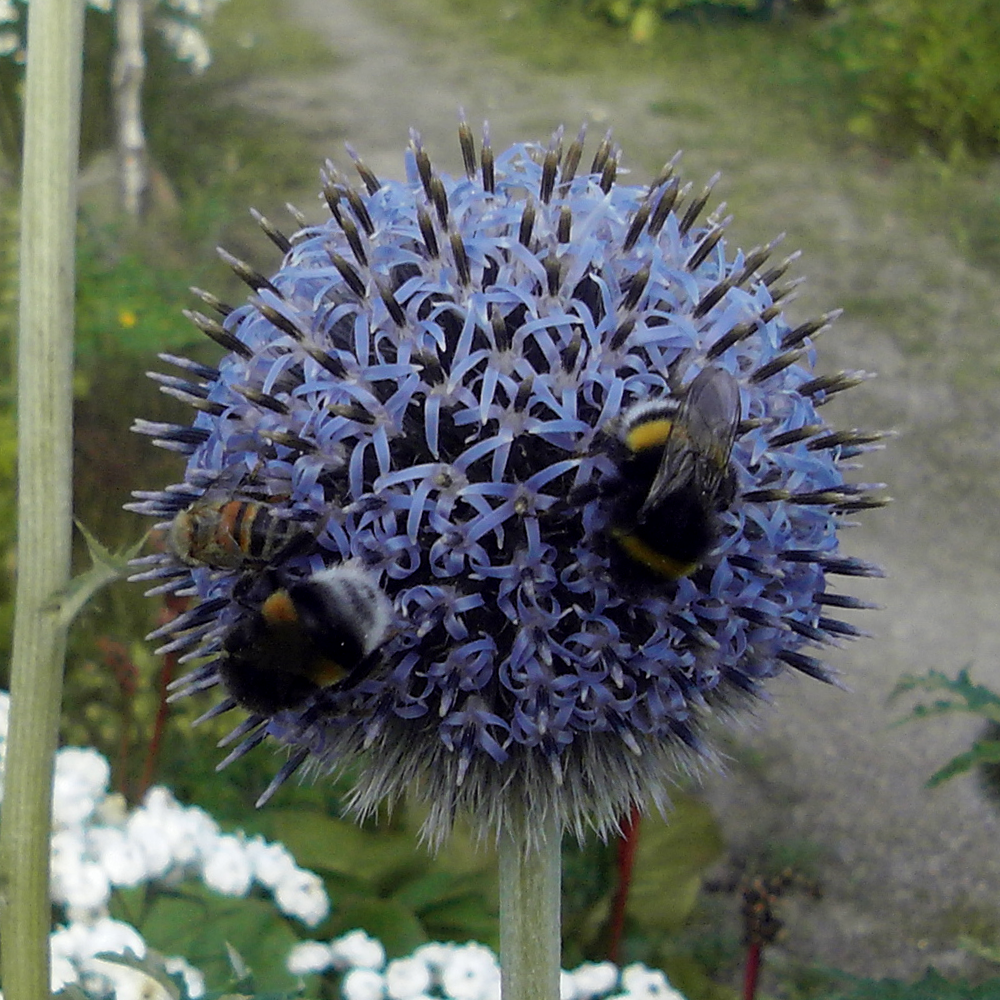
Bees pollinating

A pollination network is a bipartite mutualistic network in which plants and pollinators are the nodes, and the pollination interactions form the links between these nodes. The pollination network is bipartite as interactions only exist between two distinct, non-overlapping sets of species, but not within the set: a pollinator can never be pollinated, unlike in a predator-prey network where a predator can be depredated. A pollination network is two-modal, i.e., it includes only links connecting plant and animal communities.

== Nested structure of pollination networks ==
A key feature of pollination networks is their nested design. A study of 52 mutualist networks (including plant-pollinator interactions and plant-seed disperser interactions) found that most of the networks were nested. This means that the core of the network is made up of highly connected generalists (a pollinator that visits many different species of plant), while specialized species interact with a subset of the species that the generalists interact with (a pollinator that visits few species of plant, which are also visited by generalist pollinators). As the number of interactions in a network increases, the degree of nestedness increases as well. One property that results from nested structure of pollination networks is an asymmetry in specialization, where specialist species are often interacting with some of the most generalized species. This is in contrast to the idea of reciprocal specialization, where specialist pollinators interact with specialist plants. Similar to the relationship between network complexity and network nestedness, the amount of asymmetry in specialization increases as the number of interactions increases.

== Modularity of networks ==
Another feature that is common in pollination networks is modularity. Modularity occurs when certain groups of species within a network are much more highly connected to each other than they are with the rest of the network, with weak interactions connecting different modules. Within modules it has been shown that individual species play certain roles. Highly specialized species often only interact with individuals within their own module and are known as ‘peripheral species’; more generalized species can be thought of as ‘hubs’ within their own module, with interactions between many different species; there are also species which are very generalized which can act as ‘connectors’ between their own module and other modules. A study of three separate networks, all of which showed modularity, revealed that hub species were always plants and not the insect pollinators. Previous work has found that networks will become nested at a smaller size (number of species) than that where networks frequently become modular.

== Species loss and robustness to collapse ==
There is substantial interest into the robustness of pollination networks to species loss and collapse, especially due to anthropogenic factors such as habitat destruction. The structure of a network is thought to affect how long it is able to persist after species decline begins. In particular, the nested structure of networks has been shown to protect against complete destruction of the network, because the core group of generalists are the most robust to extinction by habitat loss. Models specifically focused on the effects of habitat loss have shown that specialist species tend to go extinct first, while the last species to go extinct are the most generalized of the network. Other studies focusing specifically on the removal of different types of species showed that species decline is the fastest when removing the most generalized species. However, there have been contrasting results on how rapidly decline occurs with removal of these species. One study showed that even at the fastest rate, the decline was still linear. Another study revealed that with the removal of the most common pollinator species, the network showed a drastic collapse. In addition to focusing on the removal of species themselves, other work has emphasized the importance of studying the loss of interactions, as this will often precede species loss and may well accelerate the rate at which extinction occurs.

== See also ==
- Aeroplankton
- Biological network
