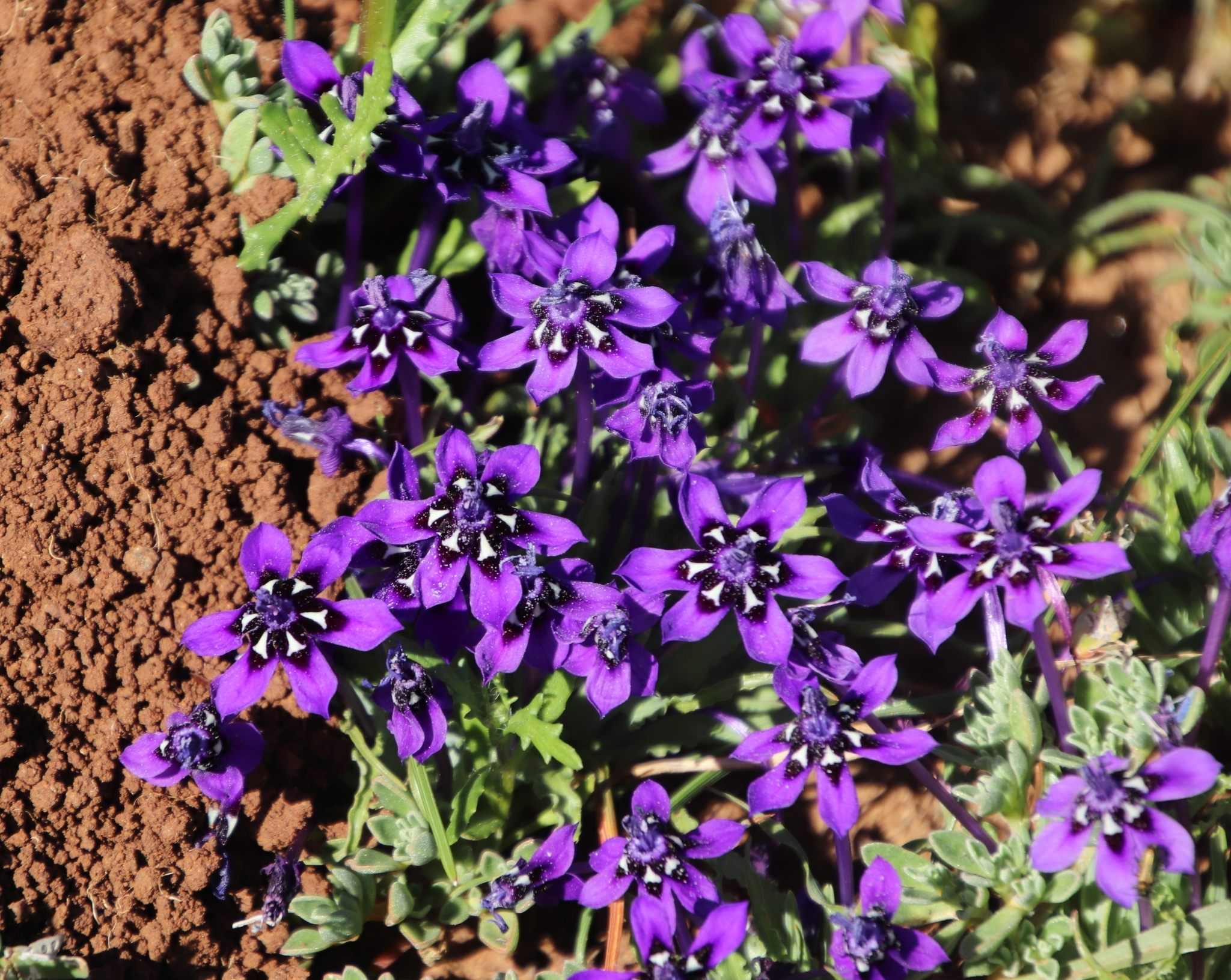

Scientific classification
- Kingdom: Plantae
- Clade: Tracheophytes
- Clade: Angiosperms
- Clade: Monocots
- Order: Asparagales
- Family: Iridaceae
- Genus: Lapeirousia
- Species: L. oreogena

Binomial name
- Lapeirousia oreogena Schltr. ex Goldblatt
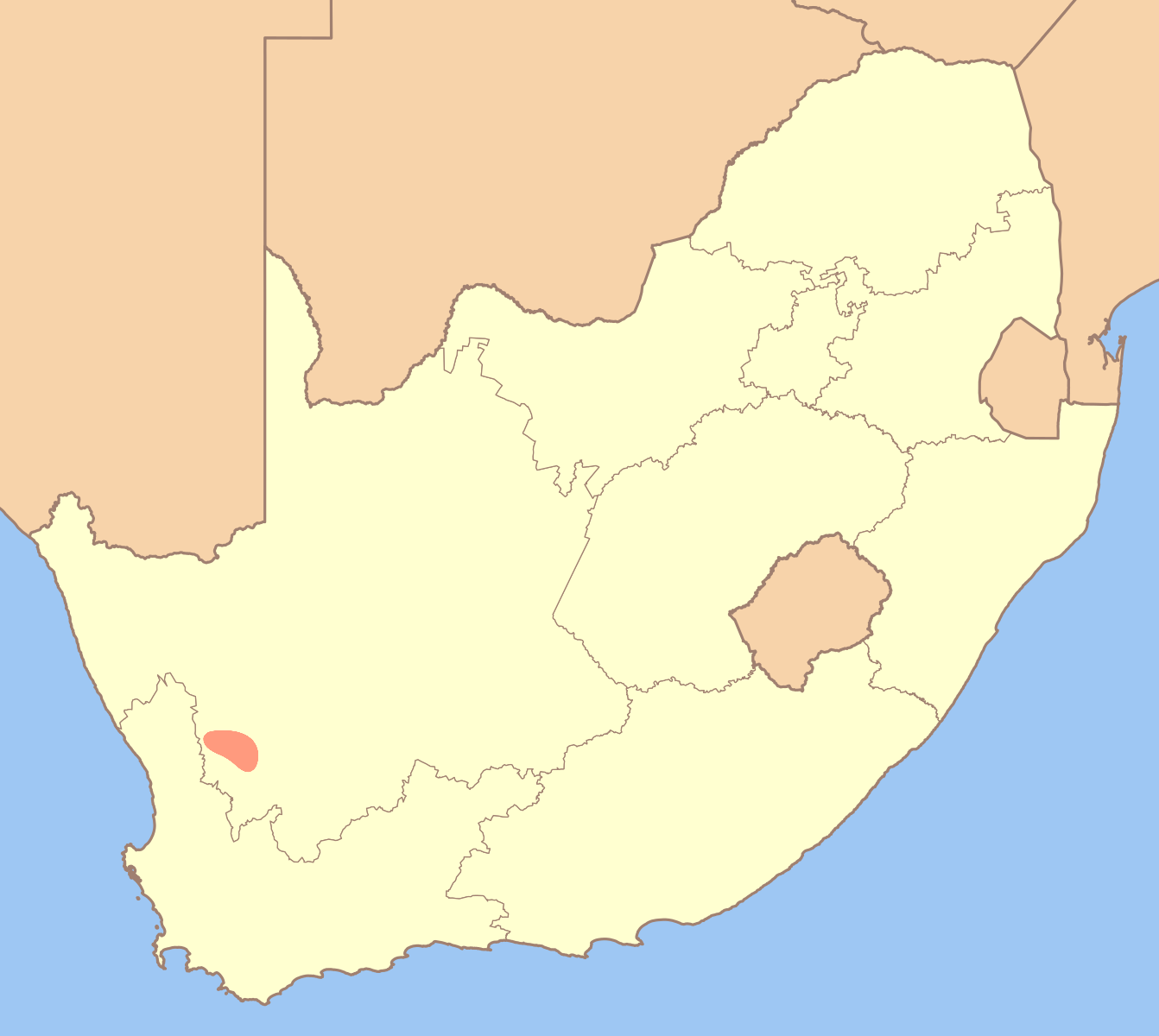
- Distribution of L. oreogena in South Africa

= Lapeirousia oreogena =

Species of plant

Lapeirousia oreogena, known in English as cushion cabong and in Afrikaans as perskussing, is a species of tuberous geophyte in the Iris family, Iridaceae. It is found in a small area between the provinces of Northern Cape and Western Cape in South Africa. Lapeirousia oreogena was first described in 1897 by Rudolf Schlechter and then subsequently published in Contributions from the Bolus Herbarium by Peter Goldblatt in 1972.

The flowers of L. oreogena are pollinated by a single species of fly in the family Nemestrinidae, Prosoeca marinusi, a relationship described as one of the "most specialized systems" of coevolution among related plants. It is recognized by the Red List of South African Plants as being "least concern".

== Description ==
Lapeirousia oreogena is a tuberous geophyte in the Iris family, Iridaceae. It formerly was placed in the subgenus Lapeirousia, in the L. silenoides group, within the genus Lapeirousia, with recent genetic analysis showing that it belongs in Clade B, with its closest relative being Lapeirousia plicata. The plant grows out of a corm and lacks a stem, it is a perennial that reaches heights of 10 centimetres (3.9 in). It is described as a "striking species" by the Pacific Bulb Society, with linear to sword shaped outer leaves and undulated inner leaves. The leaves are described as being lanceolate in shape, ribbed, and tufted.

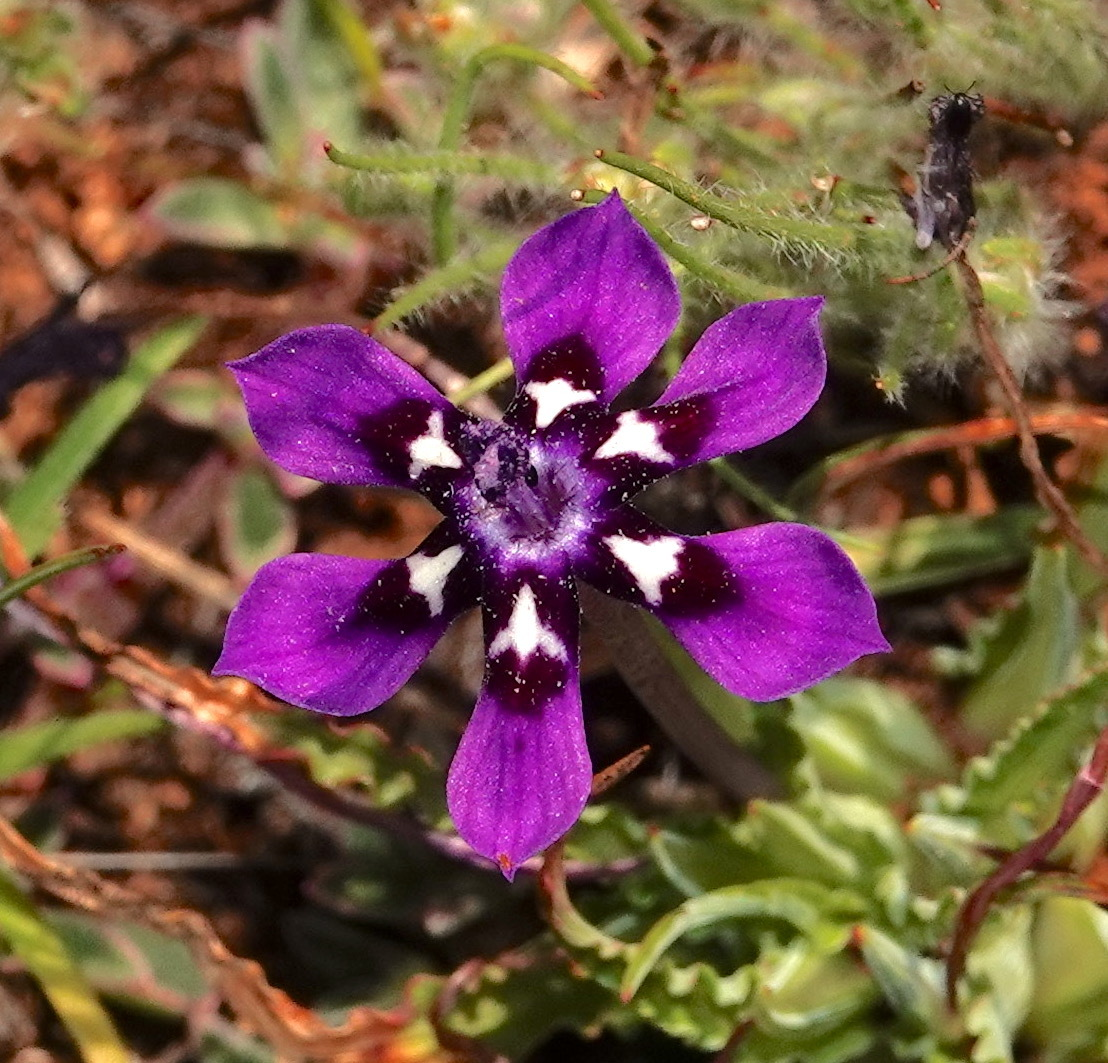
Closeup of a flower, note the arrowhead shaped markers that serve to aid in proboscis insertion

The flowers are actinomorphic, being star-shaped, rather than the two-lipped flowers that are common for the cabong genus Lapeirousia. The flowers of L. oreogena are protandrous, meaning the male sexual organs develop before the female. The flowers are scentless to the human nose. They are borne on an inflorescence at ground level, in the shape of a spiralling spike on slender, undulating bracts that are green in colour. Flowers per plant vary between year to year, in vigorous plants, they can have five spikes with up to 20 flowers per spike. They are violet in color, with the tepal bases having black to dark purple blotches in an inner ring, with six cream colored markings that are shaped resembling isosceles triangles or arrowheads that point towards the entrance of the corolla tube. These markings serve as functional nectar guides to facilitate the successful insertion of the pollinator fly's proboscis during pollination. The flowers are 2 centimetres (0.79 in) in diameter. The flowers have six tepals which are slightly obovate in shape, with the upper parts rounded and slightly curving inwards. At the base of the flower is a long perianth tube at a length of 4.5–6 centimetres (1.8–2.4 in). Both the tepals and the flower markings are UV absorptive.

Due to the actinomorphic nature of the flower, the stamens and style are symmetrically disposed. There are three stamens which stand erect at the centre of the flower. The anthers are oblong in shape, and are blue-purple in colour. The style has three branches, the thinner-style branches are slightly longer than the rest. L. oreogena is known to be able to set seed in greenhouses where insects were excluded, implying partial autogamy, but field studies demonstrate that the plant is dependent on pollinator visitation for seed production.

Flowering occurs in late winter and early spring, from August to September. Flowers generally are open from 3 to 5 days, and stigmas are extended and open on days 2 to 3.

== Pollination ==
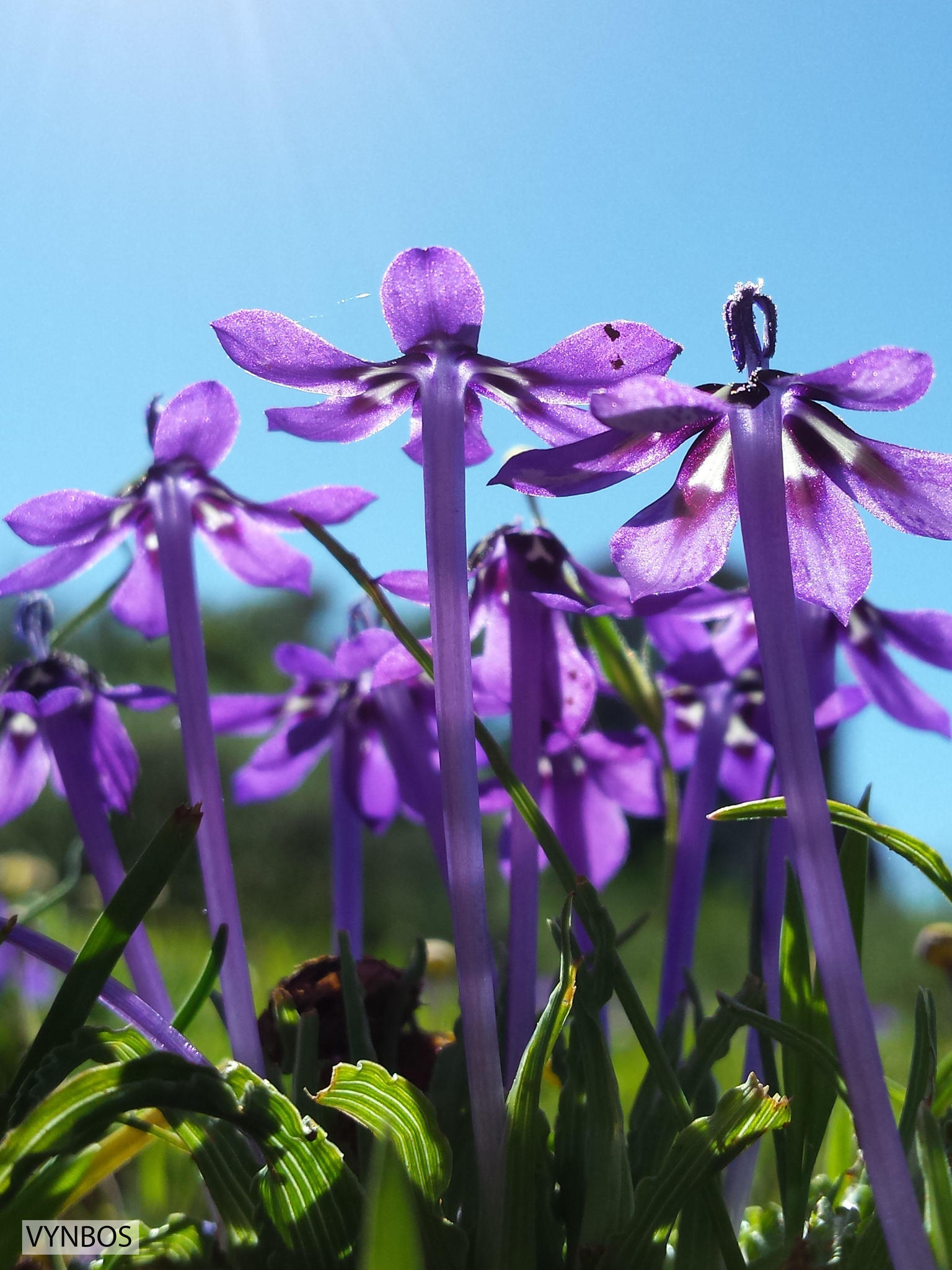
Ant's eye view showing the long flower tubes that evolved against the longer proboscis of the Prosoeca pollinator fly in an evolutionary arms race.

Lapeirousia oreogena is rhinomyophilous, a pollination syndrome referring to the pollination of flowers by flies with long mouthparts. The flowers of L. oreogena are pollinated by a single species of Nemestrinid fly in the genus Prosoeca, described as one of the "most specialized systems" of coevolution among related plants. 28 plants in the region converged to the same pollination syndrome as L. oreogena. The species of Prosoeca was formally named in 2018 as Prosoeca marinusi, which serves as the only or main pollinator for four species of plant.

The flies hover in order to orient themselves and insert their proboscis into the tube. When the proboscis is inserted into the tube of sufficient length, as it feeds the fly grabs the tepals of the flower with all three pairs of legs through flexing its tibiae while the wings remain in motion. The pollinator fly is most active on mild and warm days from mid-afternoon and the early afternoon, and has a second flight period in the late afternoon. Flowers are visited between 3 and 5 seconds, pollen is adhered to the frons and thorax. It is the sole species that has pollen deposition on the frons and thorax, with other Lapeirousia species depositing pollen on the dorsum and upper frons. In order to facilitate the most efficient transfer of pollen, flies must be just out of reach of the bottom of the nectar tube. Because of this, there exists an evolutionary arms race between the plant and the fly selecting for longer flower tubes and longer tongued flies to facilitate more efficiency in nectar acquisition.

In experiments conducted by Dennis Hansen et al., the flowers' arrow markings were blotted out using black ink from markers which resulted in a reflectivity similar to the base colour of the tepal. Pollen dispersal was simulated using the application of dye powder. The result was that flies were able to find the flowers with equal frequency. But with the removal of the arrow markings, the pollinators were unable to insert their proboscis successfully. Only 5 out of 64 flies (7.8%) were successfully able to insert their proboscis successfully. The UV absorption of the nectar guides contradicted popular notions that nectar guides provided reflective contrast on the UV spectrum. Without arrow markings, only a single flower out of 20 was able to export dye grains, compared to 11 out of 21 which had retained their arrow markings. The fruit set of unmarked female flowers (17 out of 29) compared to marked female flowers (9 out of 34) was significantly higher. The results demonstrated a causal link between nectar guides and plant fitness for both male and female components of a plant within a natural system. Long distance attraction was not impacted significantly by the absence of nectar guides, but when pollinators were attracted, in the absence of guides, flies were left hovering above the corolla or attempting to probe the flower and finding themselves unable to.

== Distribution ==
Lapeirousia oreogena has a fairly restricted distribution, on the northern extremity of the Cape Floristic Region of South Africa. It is found in clay soils in the Northwestern Cape region of South Africa. Namely the Calvinia District, to the Bokkeveld Plateau and the western Karoo, and Nieuwoudtville.

=== Habitat ===
Lapeirousia oreogena inhabits renosterveld on clay flats. In the Nieuwoudtville Wildflower Reserve, plants were found in dense patches in open grassy areas between boulder outcrops made of dolerite.

== Conservation ==
Lapeirousia oreogena is not currently considered to be threatened. In a 2005 review of South African Flora, D. Raimondo and J.E. Victor ranked Lapeirousia oreogena as "least-concern". This is the current designation of L. oreogena as recognized by the South African National Biodiversity Institute's Red List of South African Plants. It was previously assessed as "rare" in a 1996 review by C. Hilton-Taylor for the "Red data list of southern African plants". According to a 2024 assessment by S.P. Bachman et al., it was described as "confident" to be threatened in the future.

== Etymology ==
The generic epiphet for the genus Lapeirousia is derived from Philippe-Isidore Picot de Lapeyrouse. The specific epiphet, oreogena, means "born of mountains." Lapeirousia oreogena was first described in 1897 by Rudolf Schlechter and then subsequently published in Contributions from the Bolus Herbarium by Peter Goldblatt in 1972.

The English language name for the plant is "cushion cabong", in Afrikaans its name is perskussing, which means "purple cushion." It is also known as "purple laps" or "bluesy" in English. The Afrikaans name perskussing is shared with the related Babiana praemorsa.
