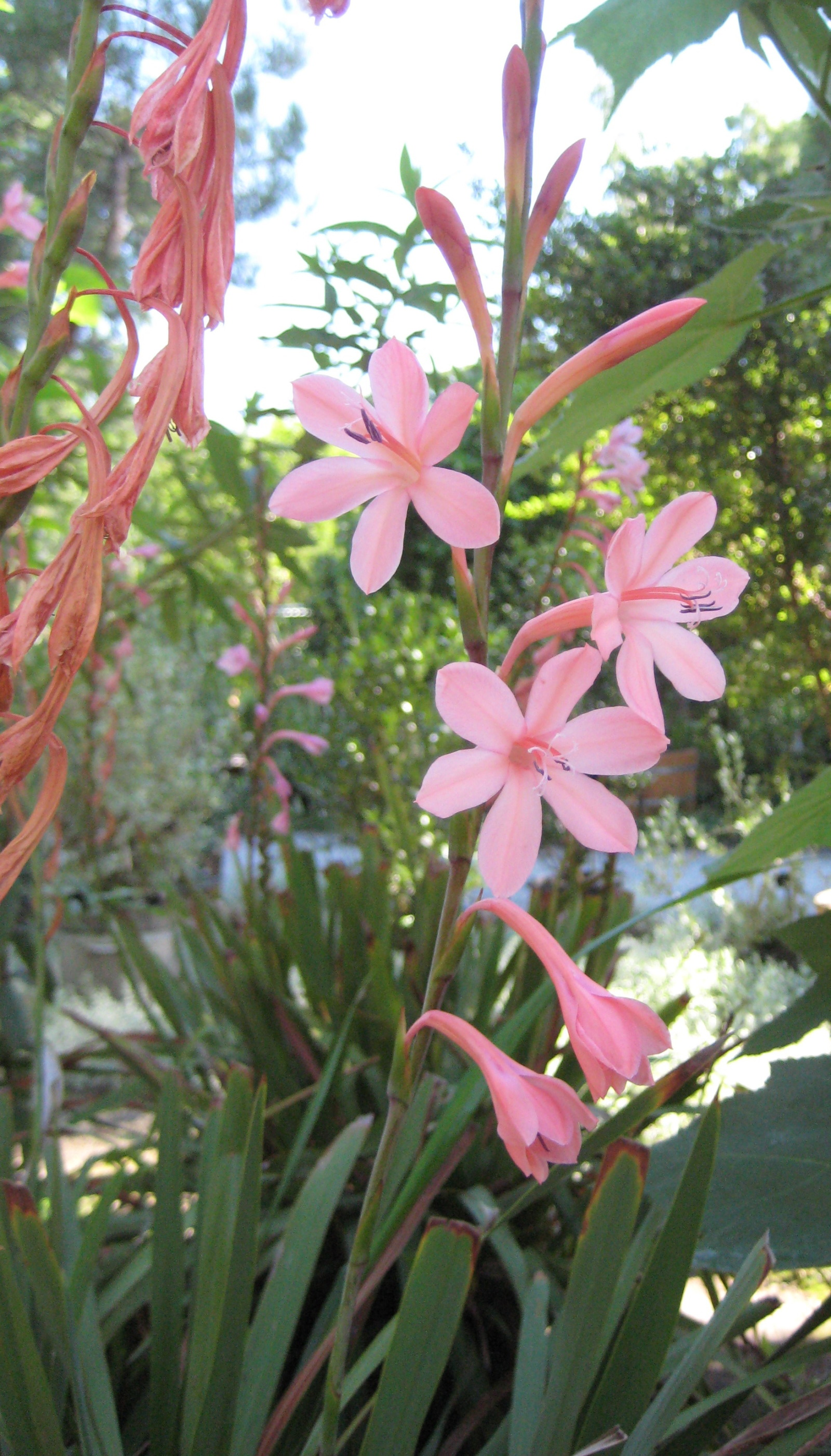
- Watsonia tabularis

Scientific classification
- Kingdom: Plantae
- Clade: Tracheophytes
- Clade: Angiosperms
- Clade: Monocots
- Order: Asparagales
- Family: Iridaceae
- Subfamily: Crocoideae
- Tribe: Watsonieae; Klatt

Genera
- See text

= Watsonieae =

Tribe of flowering plants

Watsonieae is the second largest tribe in the subfamily Crocoideae (which is included in the family Iridaceae) and named after the best-known genus in it — Watsonia. The members in this group are widely distributed in Africa, mainly in its southern parts.

The species in this tribe sometimes have the typical sword-shaped leaves of the family Iridaceae, but sometimes, like in Lapeirousia pyramidalis or Lapeirousia divaricata, they have different morphologies. The rootstock is a corm.

The flowers are arranged in inflorescences and sometimes are scented. The flowers have six tepals which are identical in the most cases or have small differences. The ovary is 3-locular.

Watsonia is often used for ornamental purposes. The other genera have ornamental potential but are less well known.

== List of genera ==
Genera:

- Cyanixia
- Lapeirousia
- Micranthus
- Pillansia
- Savannosiphon
- Thereianthus
- Watsonia
- Zygotritonia
