= Pierre André Pourret =

French abbot and botanist (1754–1818)

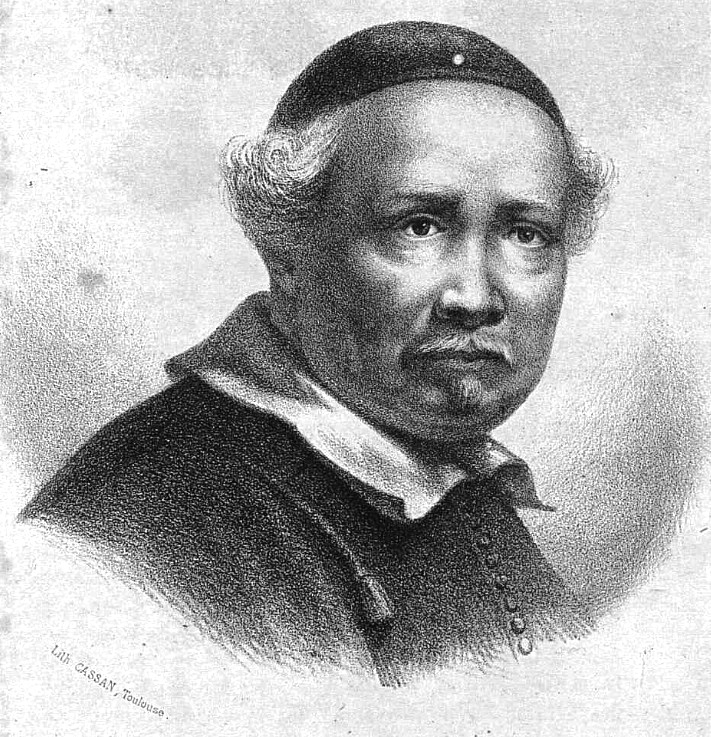

Pierre André Pourret (1754–1818) was a French abbot and botanist who did research and teaching in France and Spain. He described and collected large amounts of plant species, especially from the Mediterranean, and amassed many species in his botanical garden and herbarium for his research. Pourret was also a pioneer user of binomial nomenclature, first developed by Carl Linnaeus.

== Career ==
Pierre André Pourret was a clergyman, but started his botanical career earlier, working in the regions around his hometown, Narbonne. His given parish, however, was Saint-Jacob in Provence. He sent manuscripts of documented research to the Académie des sciences, inscriptions et belles-lettres de Toulouse. During the French Revolution in 1789, Pourret was exiled to Spain. He did botanical work in Barcelona, Madrid, and ultimately the city of Ourense in Galicia. Due to xenophobia to the French during Napoleon's invasion of Spain, an angry mob drove Pourret out of his herbarium, burning many of his resources in the process. He lived an obscure life in Santiago de Compostela until his death in 1818.

== Legacy ==
His botanical collection can be found in the School of Pharmacy at the Complutense University of Madrid, donated by the University of Santiago de Compostela.

== Publications ==
- Pourret, P.A.(1781), Itineraire pour les Pyrénées
- Pourret, P.A.(1783), Projet d'une histoire générale de la famille des Cistes
- Pourret, P.A.(1784), Chloris Narbonensis
- Pourret, P.A.,Memoire sur divers volcans ėteints de la Catalogne, Palassou, Pierre Bernard (1823), Nouveaux mémoires pour servir à l'histoire naturelle des Pyrénées et des pays adjacents, Pau: Vignancour.

== See also ==
- Lapeirousia
- List of botanists by author abbreviation
- Philippe-Isidore Picot de Lapeyrouse
