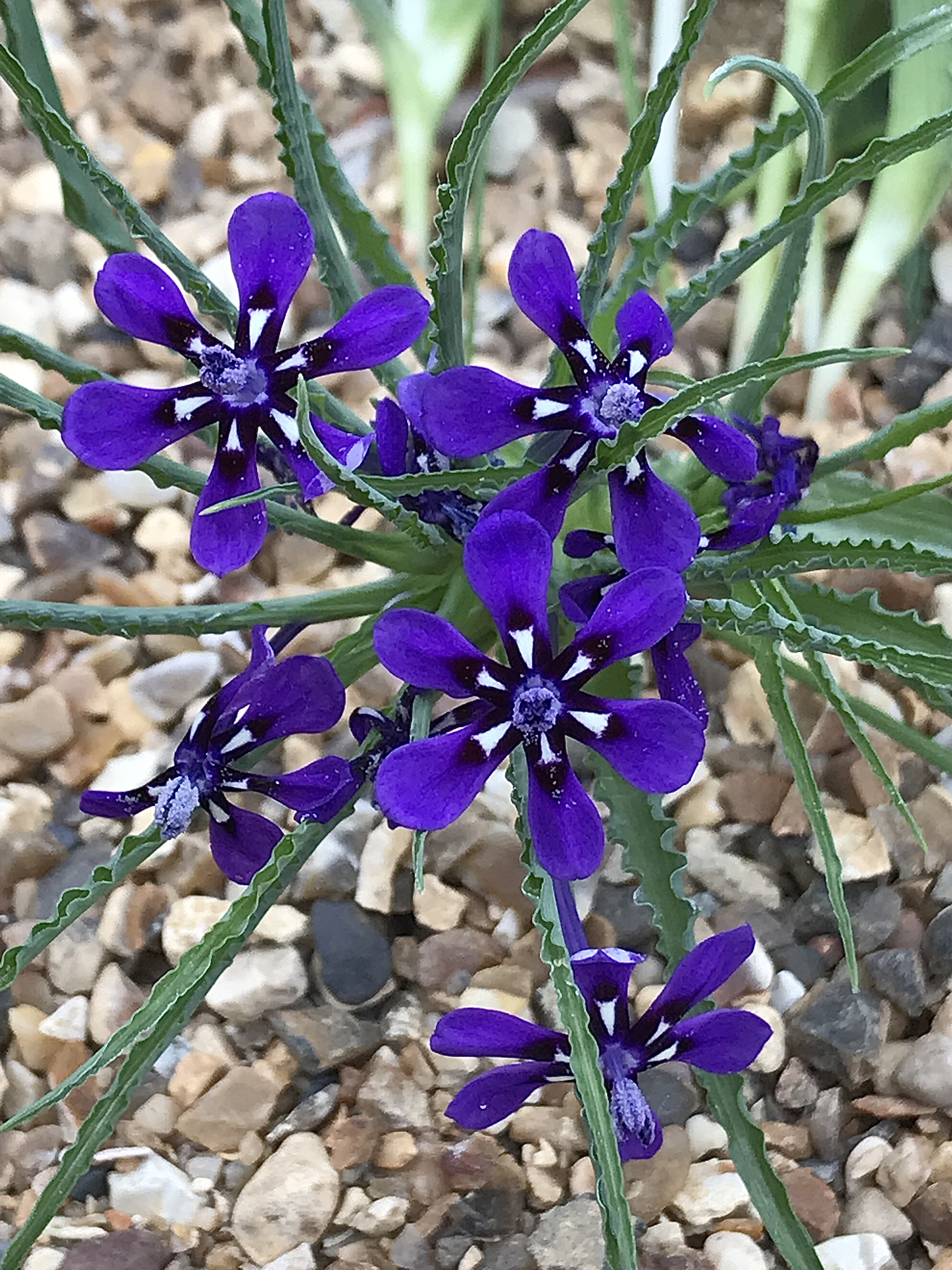
- Lapeirousia oreogena

Scientific classification
- Kingdom: Plantae
- Clade: Tracheophytes
- Clade: Angiosperms
- Clade: Monocots
- Order: Asparagales
- Family: Iridaceae
- Subfamily: Crocoideae
- Tribe: Watsonieae
- Genus: Lapeirousia; Pourr., 1788

= Lapeirousia =

Genus of flowering plants

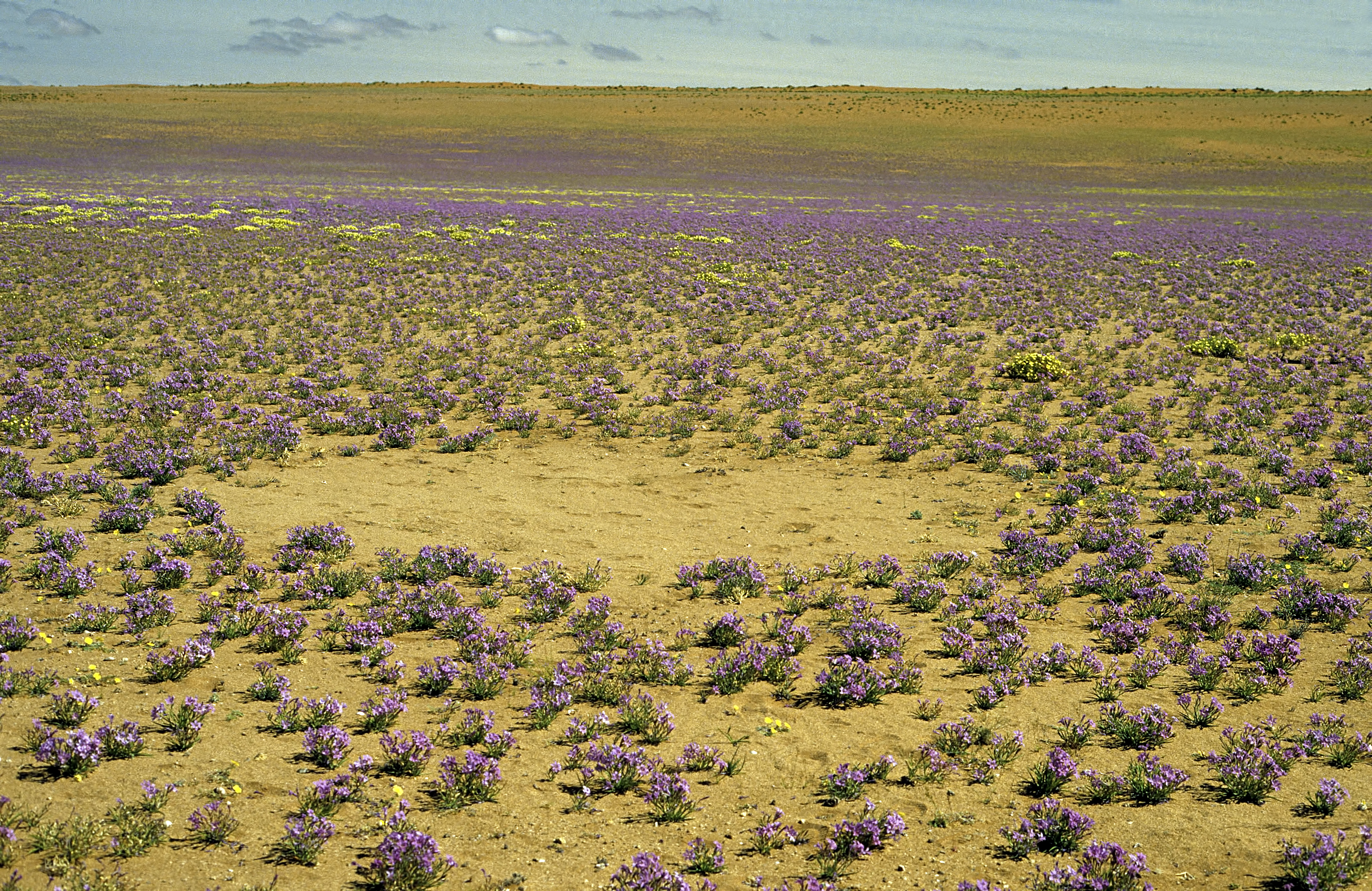
Vast expanse of the southern Namib Desert (specifically the area lying to the west of Obib Mountain near Rosh Pinah) carpeted with thousands of L. barklyi and featuring also a fairy circle (foreground)

Lapeirousia is a genus in the plant family Iridaceae. It is endemic to sub-Saharan Africa, about a third of the species occurring in fynbos.

== Origin of genus name ==
The genus Lapeirousia was described by Pierre André Pourret in Mém. Acad. Sci. Toulouse 3 : 79 (1788); Bak. In FC. 6 : 88 (1896) in part; Goldblatt in Contrib. Bol. Herb. 4 : 1 (1972); Sölch & Roessl. in FSWA. 155 : 6 (1969). Chasmatocallis Foster in Contrib. Gray Herb. 127 : 40 (1939). He named the genus in honour of his friend, the botanist Philippe-Isidore Picot de Lapeyrouse. The inconsistent spellings of that name no doubt led to the original genus name being spelt "Lapeirousia" and contributed to various subsequent misspellings of the genus in various reference sources, notably "Lapeyrousia". There also has been confusion leading to unfounded claims that the genus was named after the French mariner Jean-François de Galaup, comte de Lapérouse, who had nothing substantial to do with matters botanical, and was unrelated to de Lapeyrouse.

== Description ==
Lapeirousia are cormous plants, usually small, and bearing deciduous leaves. The corms are small, campanulate to triangular in outline, and flat-based. The tunics comprise hard, woody layers, of which the innermost layers are entire. The leaves are basal, often solitary. They may be plane and falcate, or linear and ribbed. Various forms of scape occur; they may be either subterranean or aerial, and simple or branched. The inflorescence is a spike, sometimes contracted and fasciculate or a corymbose panicle. There are firm, green bracts, either small and subequal, or with the outer bract very large, often keeled, crisped and ribbed. The perianth may be either actinomorphic or zygomorphic; the tube short or very long. It might be slender and cylindrical, adapted to pollination by long-tongued flies, or it might be funnel-shaped. The flowers' lobes may be subequal and spreading, or unequal with upper largest petals erect, the lower three forming a lip. The stamens are symmetrically arranged. The fruit is a membranous capsule containing many small seeds, either globose or angled by pressure.

== Species ==
About 26 species have been described from Southern Africa, of which about a third are endemic to fynbos. Common names are various and regional, including painted petals, cabong, chabi, koringblom (Afrikaans for "wheat flower"). The flowers are commonly scented, though possibly only at certain times of day.

- Lapeirousia anceps (L.f.) Ker Gawl.
- Lapeirousia angustifolia Schltr.
- Lapeirousia arenicola Schltr.
- Lapeirousia barklyi Baker
- Lapeirousia divaricata Baker
- Lapeirousia dolomitica Dinter
- Lapeirousia exilis Goldblatt
- Lapeirousia fabricii (D.Delaroche) Ker Gawl.
- Lapeirousia jacquinii N.E.Br.
- Lapeirousia kalahariensis Goldblatt & J.C.Manning
- Lapeirousia kamiesmontana Goldblatt & J.C.Manning
- Lapeirousia littoralis Baker
- Lapeirousia macrospatha Baker
- Lapeirousia montana Klatt
- Lapeirousia odoratissima Baker
- Lapeirousia oreogena Schltr. ex Goldblatt
- Lapeirousia plicata (Jacq.) Diels
- Lapeirousia purpurascens Goldblatt & J.C.Manning
- Lapeirousia purpurea Goldblatt & J.C.Manning
- Lapeirousia pyramidalis (Lam.) Goldblatt
- Lapeirousia silenoides (Jacq.) Ker Gawl.
- Lapeirousia simulans Goldblatt & J.C.Manning
- Lapeirousia spinosa (Goldblatt) Goldblatt & J.C.Manning
- Lapeirousia tenuis (Goldblatt) Goldblatt & J.C.Manning
- Lapeirousia verecunda Goldblatt
- Lapeirousia violacea Goldblatt

== Traditional and current relevance ==
The plants are of considerable biological and evolutionary interest because of their adaptions to particular pollinators, such as flies in the families Tabanidae, Acroceridae, Bombyliidae, and most spectacularly, Nemestrinidae.

Though most species of Lapeirousia are not showy, they are elegant and often fragrant. Collectors of fynbos plants value them.

The corms of several species were important sources of food for early hunter-gatherers. The vernacular names cabong or chabi are derived from Khoisan names for the plants.

== Gallery ==
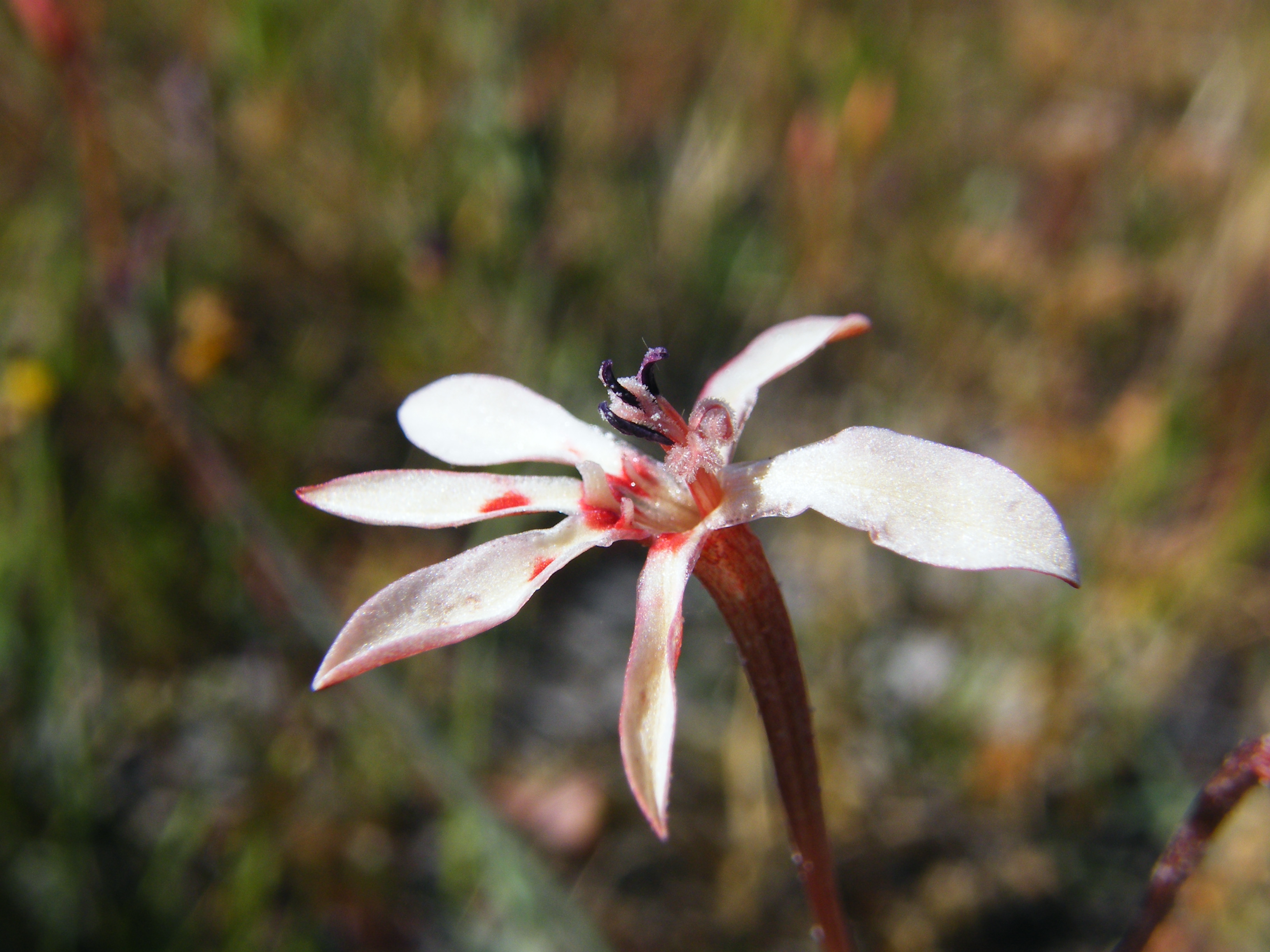
Lapeirousia anceps flower

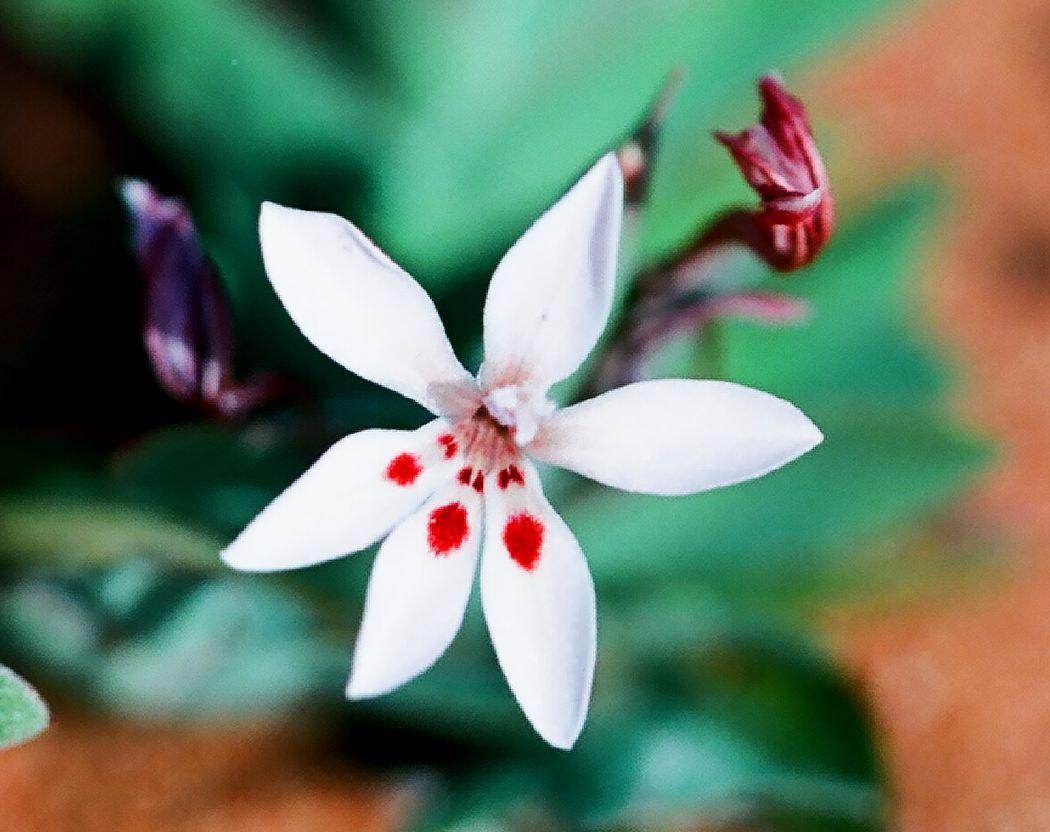
Lapeirousia arenicola flower

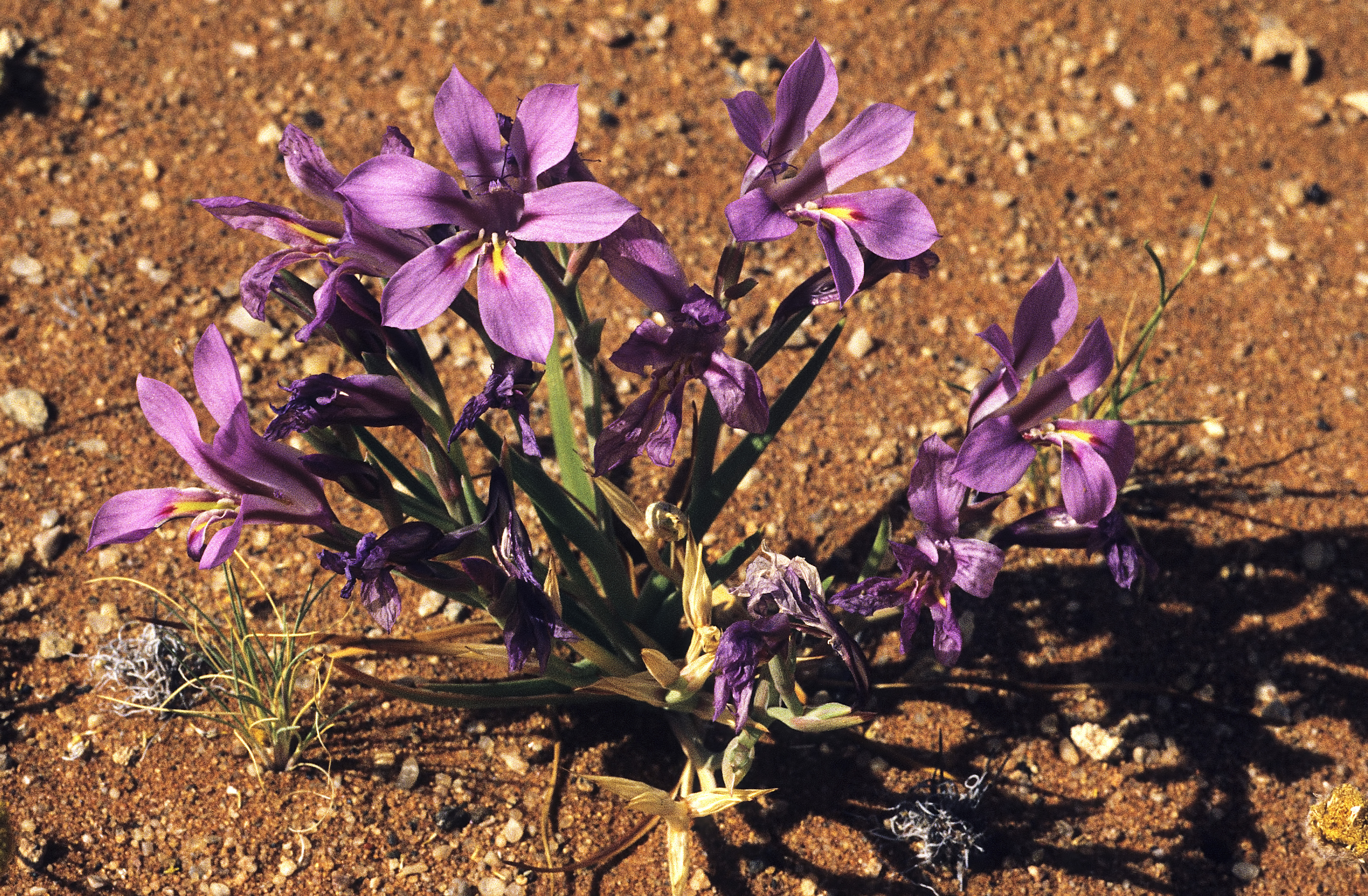
Lapeirousia barklyi growth habit

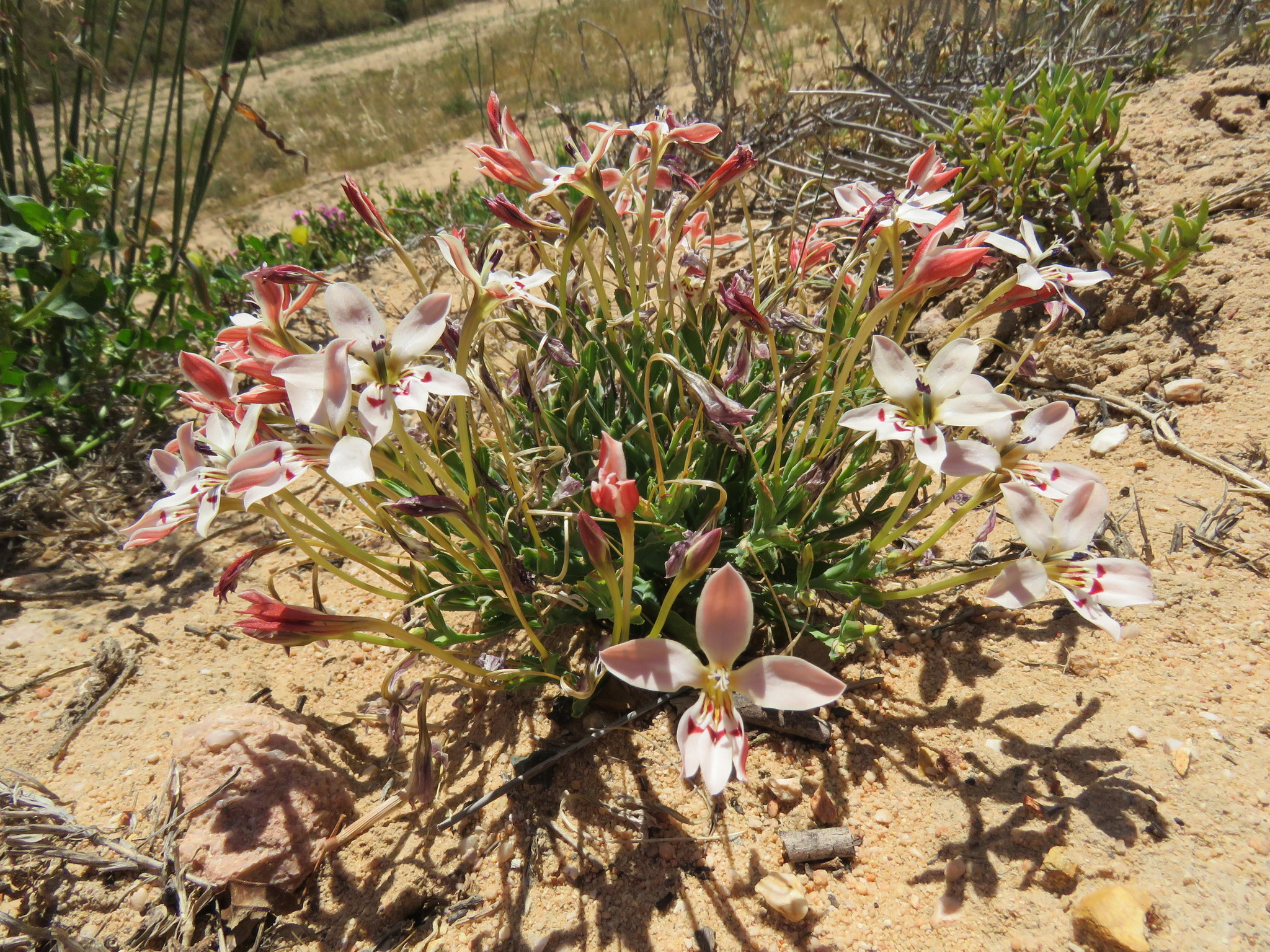
Lapeirousia fabricii growth habit

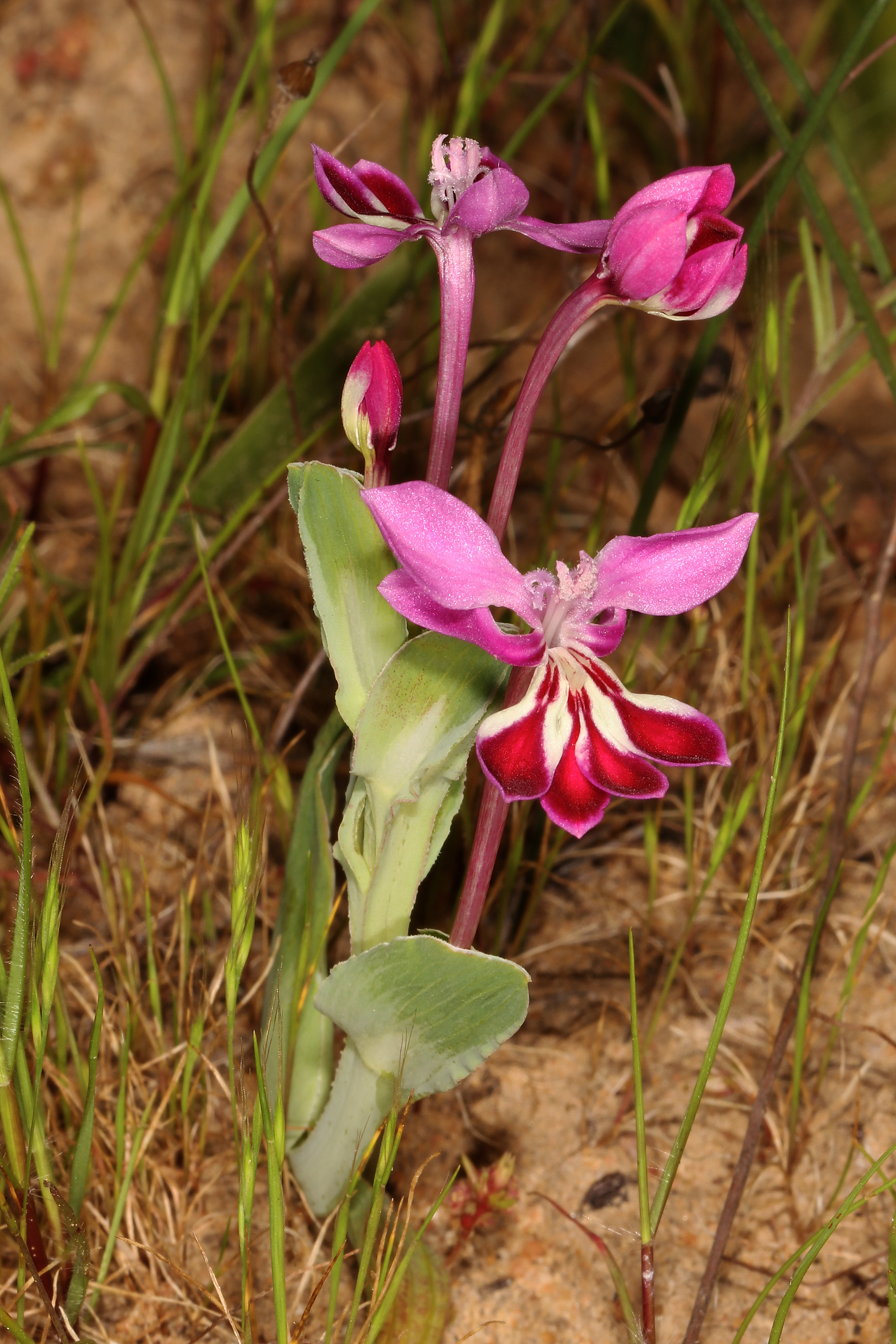
Lapeirousia jacquinii growth habit

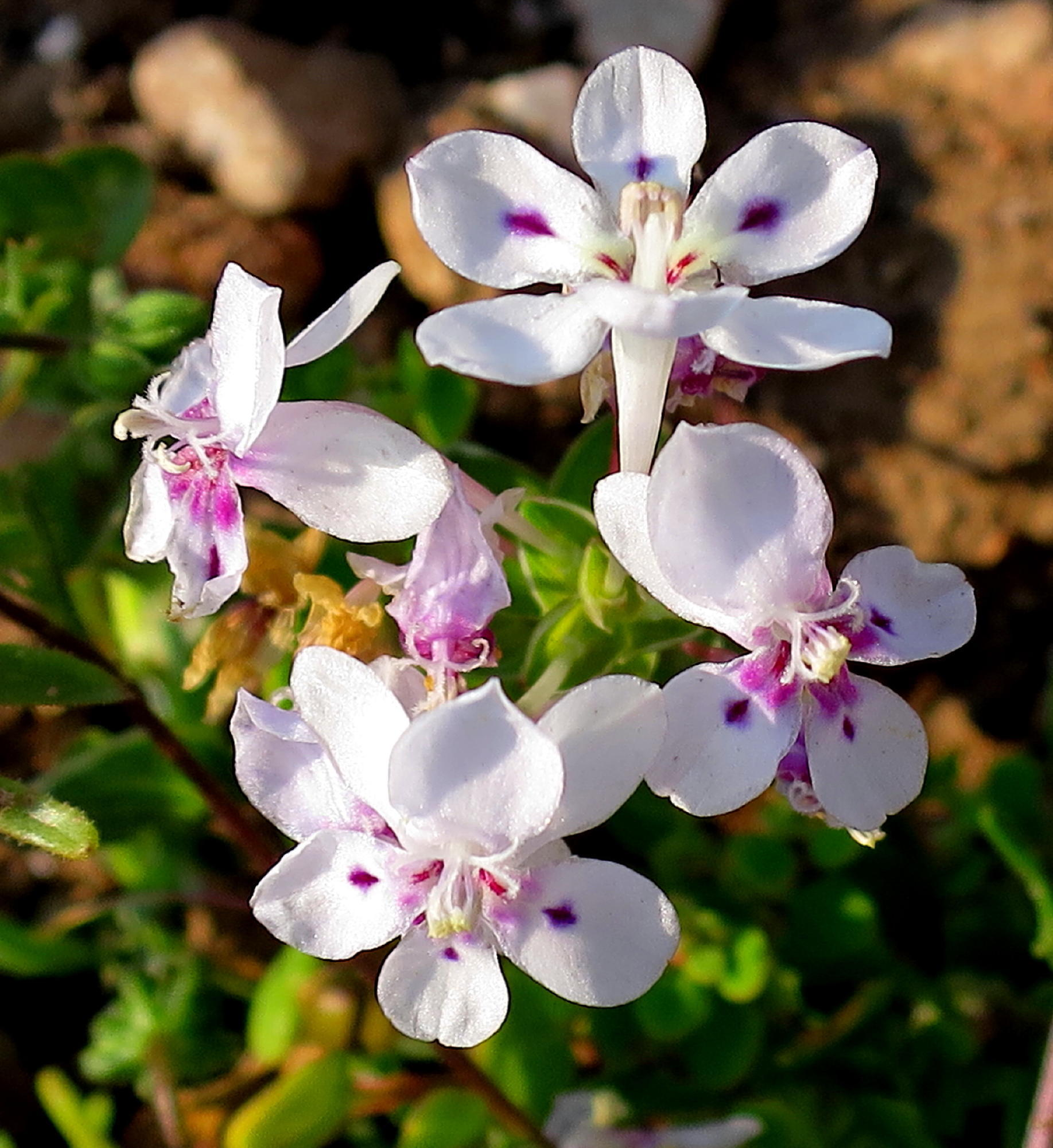
Lapeirousia pyramidalis closeup of flowers

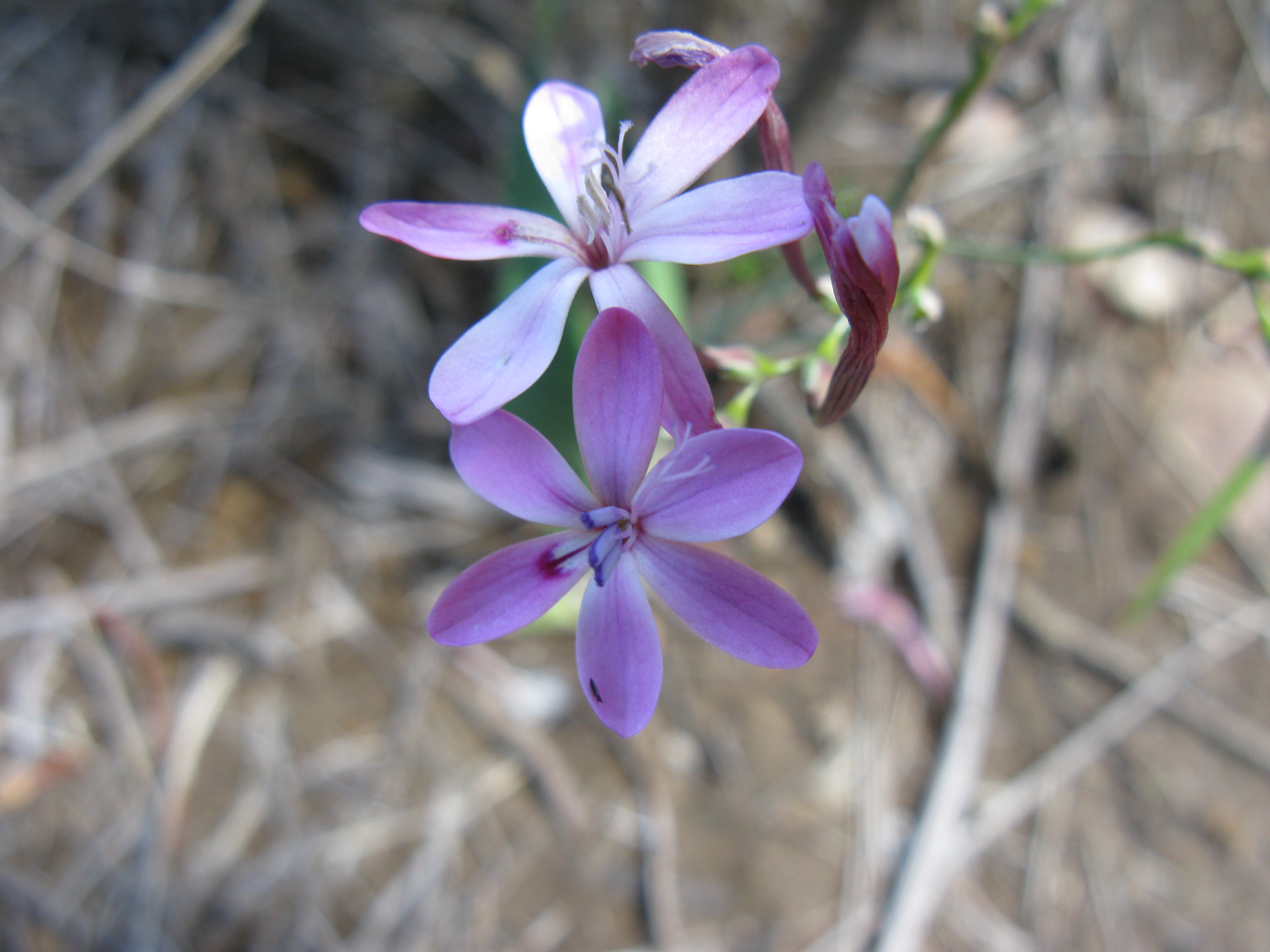
Lapeirousa sp., no Id. A common form of flower in this genus, with curiously non-perpendicular axis of symmetry and single floral guide

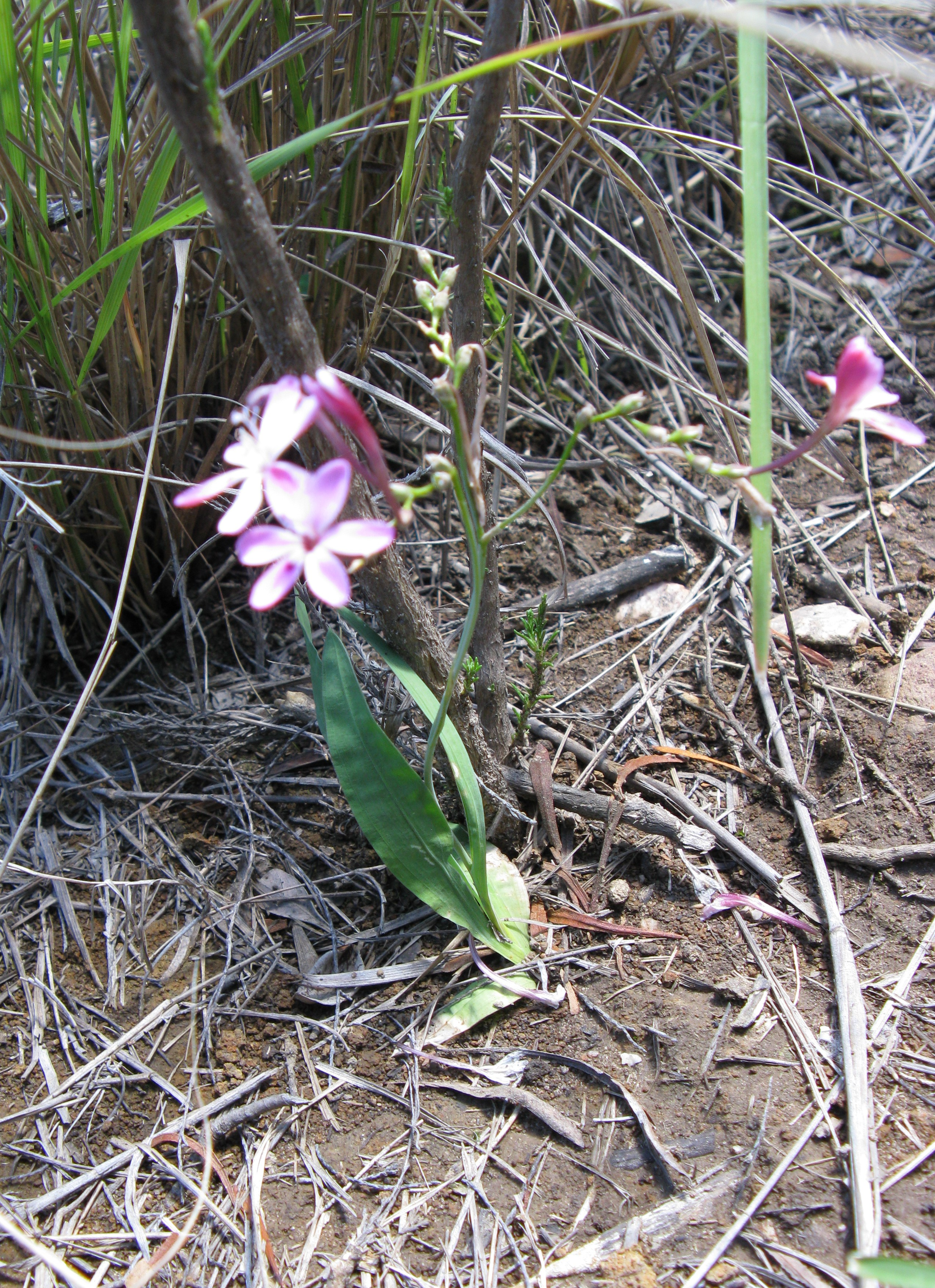
Lapeirousia species, no Id. Showing habit in native setting, plus a modestly long perianth tube for the genus
