= Lapeirousia violacea =

Scientific classification
- Kingdom: Plantae
- Clade: Tracheophytes
- Clade: Angiosperms
- Clade: Monocots
- Order: Asparagales
- Family: Iridaceae
- Genus: Lapeirousia
- Species: L. violacea

Binomial name
- Lapeirousia violacea Goldblatt, (1972)

Species of flowering plant

Lapeirousia violacea is a perennial geophyte belonging to the genus Lapeirousia and is part of the fynbos. The species is endemic to the Northern Cape and the Western Cape. It occurs from the Bokkeveldberge to the Biedouw Valley and there are nine subpopulations. The plant is threatened by the rooibos tea industry which is taking over the habitat.
