= Lapeirousia simulans =

Scientific classification
- Kingdom: Plantae
- Clade: Tracheophytes
- Clade: Angiosperms
- Clade: Monocots
- Order: Asparagales
- Family: Iridaceae
- Genus: Lapeirousia
- Species: L. simulans

Binomial name
- Lapeirousia simulans Goldblatt & J.C.Manning, (1994)

Species of flowering plant

Lapeirousia simulans is a species of flowering plant in the family Iridaceae. It is a perennial geophyte and is part of the fynbos ecoregion. The species is endemic to the Western Cape and has a range of less than 2 000 km². It occurs in the southwest of the Knersvlakte. The plant is threatened by tomato farming and the establishment of vineyards. Mining of the red sand in the area is also a threat.
