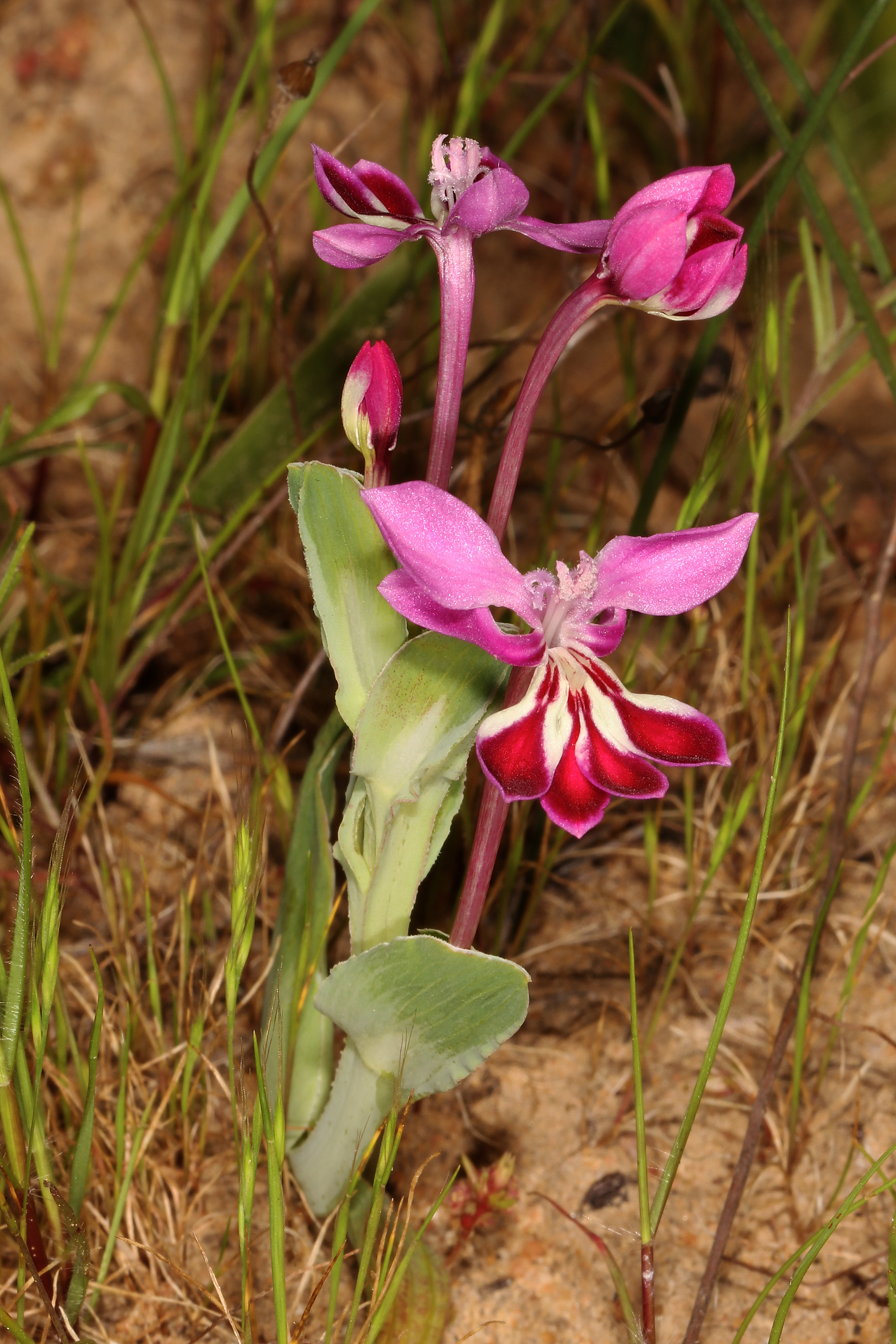

Conservation status
- Least Concern (SANBI Red List)

Scientific classification
- Kingdom: Plantae
- Clade: Tracheophytes
- Clade: Angiosperms
- Clade: Monocots
- Order: Asparagales
- Family: Iridaceae
- Genus: Lapeirousia
- Species: L. jacquinii

Binomial name
- Lapeirousia jacquinii N.E.Br.

= Lapeirousia jacquinii =

Flowering plant endemic to the Cape Provinces

Lapeirousia jacquinii is a species of flowering plant in the genus Lapeirousia. It is endemic to the Northern Cape and Western Cape of South Africa.

== Distribution ==
Lapeirousia jacquinii is found from Cape Town and Worcester in the Western Cape, northwards to Garies and Nieuwoudtville in the Northern Cape. It is usually found in sandy soil on mountains and in river valleys.

== Conservation status ==
Lapeirousia jacquinii is classified as Least Concern with a stable population.
