= Lapeirousia macrospatha =

Scientific classification
- Kingdom: Plantae
- Clade: Tracheophytes
- Clade: Angiosperms
- Clade: Monocots
- Order: Asparagales
- Family: Iridaceae
- Genus: Lapeirousia
- Species: L. macrospatha

Binomial name
- Lapeirousia macrospatha Baker, (1896)

Species of flowering plant

Lapeirousia macrospatha is a perennial geophyte belonging to the genus Lapeirousia. The species is endemic to the Northern Cape.
