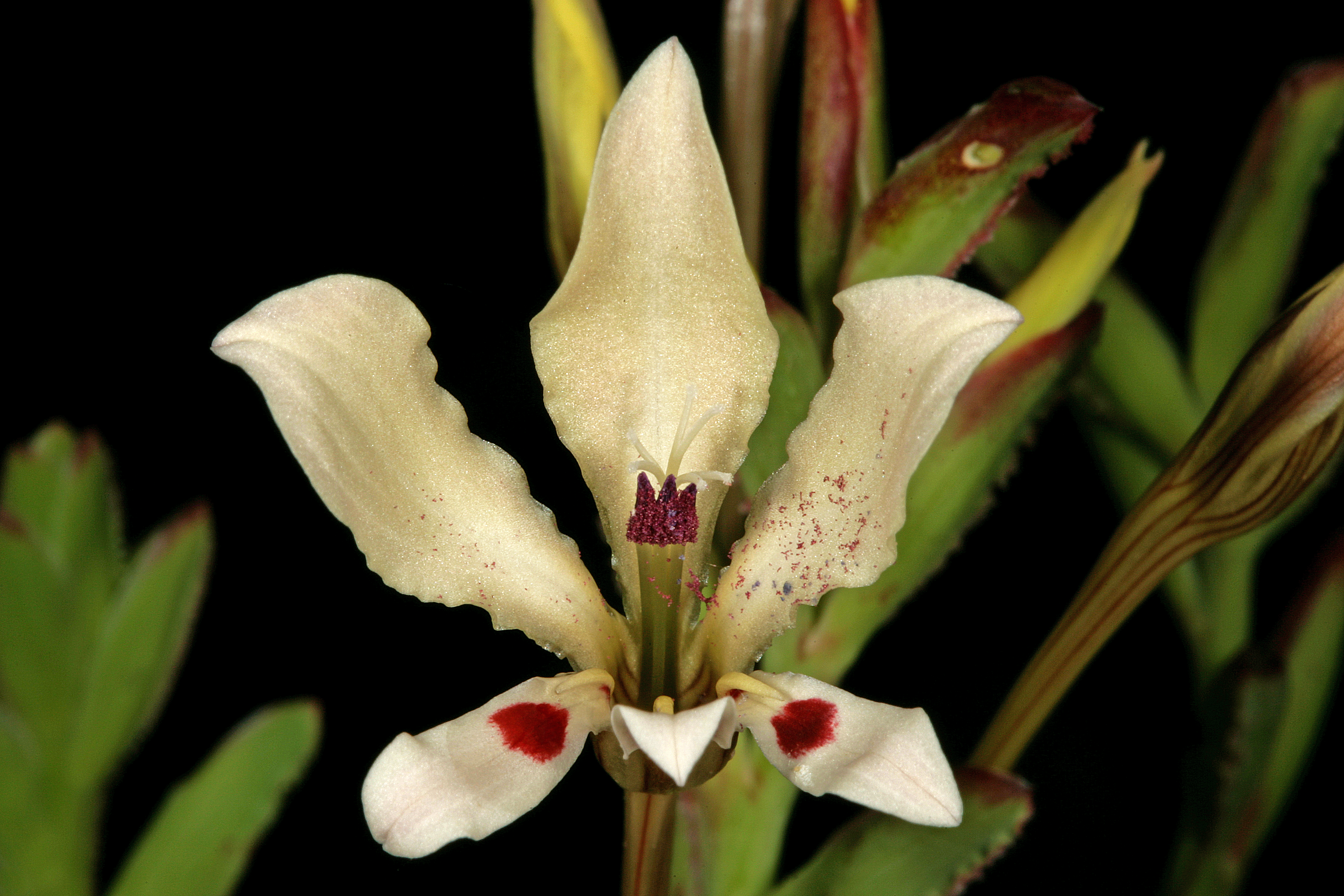

Scientific classification
- Kingdom: Plantae
- Clade: Tracheophytes
- Clade: Angiosperms
- Clade: Monocots
- Order: Asparagales
- Family: Iridaceae
- Genus: Lapeirousia
- Species: L. fabricii

Binomial name
- Lapeirousia fabricii (D.Delaroche) Ker Gawl., (1809)

Synonyms
- Gladiolus fabricii (D.Delaroche) Thunb.; Ixia fabricii D.Delaroche; Meristostigma fabricii (D.Delaroche) A.Dietr.; Ovieda fabricii (D.Delaroche) Spreng.; Peyrousia fabricii (D.Delaroche) Sweet

= Lapeirousia fabricii =

Species of flowering plant

Lapeirousia fabricii is a perennial geophyte belonging to the genus Lapeirousia. The species is endemic to the Northern Cape and the Western Cape.
