= Lapeirousia montana =

Scientific classification
- Kingdom: Plantae
- Clade: Tracheophytes
- Clade: Angiosperms
- Clade: Monocots
- Order: Asparagales
- Family: Iridaceae
- Genus: Lapeirousia
- Species: L. montana

Binomial name
- Lapeirousia montana Klatt, (1882)

Species of flowering plant

Lapeirousia montana is a perennial geophyte belonging to the genus Lapeirousia and is part of the fynbos and Succulent Karoo. The species is endemic to the Northern Cape. It occurs from the Roggeveld Mountains to Klein Roggeveld and Tankwa Karoo.
