= Lapeirousia tenuis =

Scientific classification
- Kingdom: Plantae
- Clade: Tracheophytes
- Clade: Angiosperms
- Clade: Monocots
- Order: Asparagales
- Family: Iridaceae
- Genus: Lapeirousia
- Species: L. tenuis

Binomial name
- Lapeirousia tenuis (Goldblatt) Goldblatt & J.C.Manning

Synonyms
- Lapeirousia divaricata var. tenuis (Goldblatt)

Species of plant

Lapeirousia tenuis is a species of geophyte in the genus Lapeirousia. It is endemic to northwest Cape Provinces in South Africa.

== Description ==
The height of the flower is from 70 to 250 mm long. The flowers are organized in a few-flowered spike, and the color ranges form lilac to pale purple. It is found in the months of July, August, and September.
