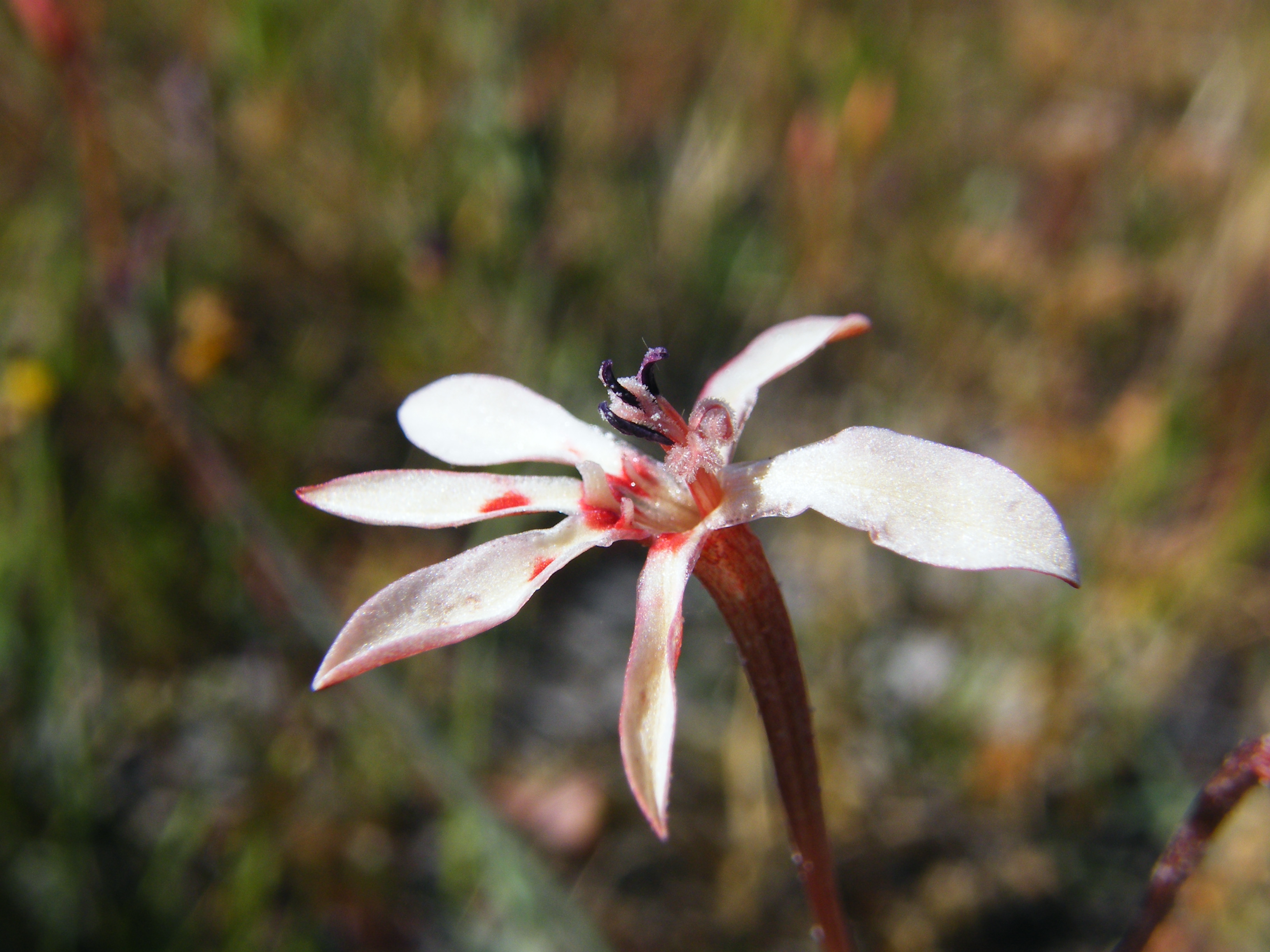

Conservation status
- Least Concern (SANBI Red List)

Scientific classification
- Kingdom: Plantae
- Clade: Tracheophytes
- Clade: Angiosperms
- Clade: Monocots
- Order: Asparagales
- Family: Iridaceae
- Genus: Lapeirousia
- Species: L. anceps

Binomial name
- Lapeirousia anceps (L.f.) Ker Gawl.

Synonyms
- Gladiolus anceps L.f.; Meristostigma anceps (L.f.) A.Dietr.; Oviedo anceps (L.f.) Spreng.; Peyrousia anceps (L.f.) Poir.

= Lapeirousia anceps =

Species of plant

Lapeirousia anceps, also known as long kabong, is a species of geophyte in the genus Lapeirousia. It is native in the Cape provinces in South Africa.

== Distribution and habitat ==
The range for Lapeirousia anceps goes from southern Namaqualand to Mossel Bay. It thrives in low rain, nutrient poor biomes.

It is most commonly found in the months of October and November.

== Description ==
It grows between 100-300 millimeters long. The flowers colors range from white to light pink, and have red markings on the lower tepals. The flowers bloom in the spring. There are 5-7 ribbed lower leaves are usually longer and wider than the upper leaves. The upper leaves are crowded near the base.

== Ecology ==
The long-proboscid fly (Moegistorhynchus longirostris), is a pollinator for the plant, using its long proboscid to get nectar.
