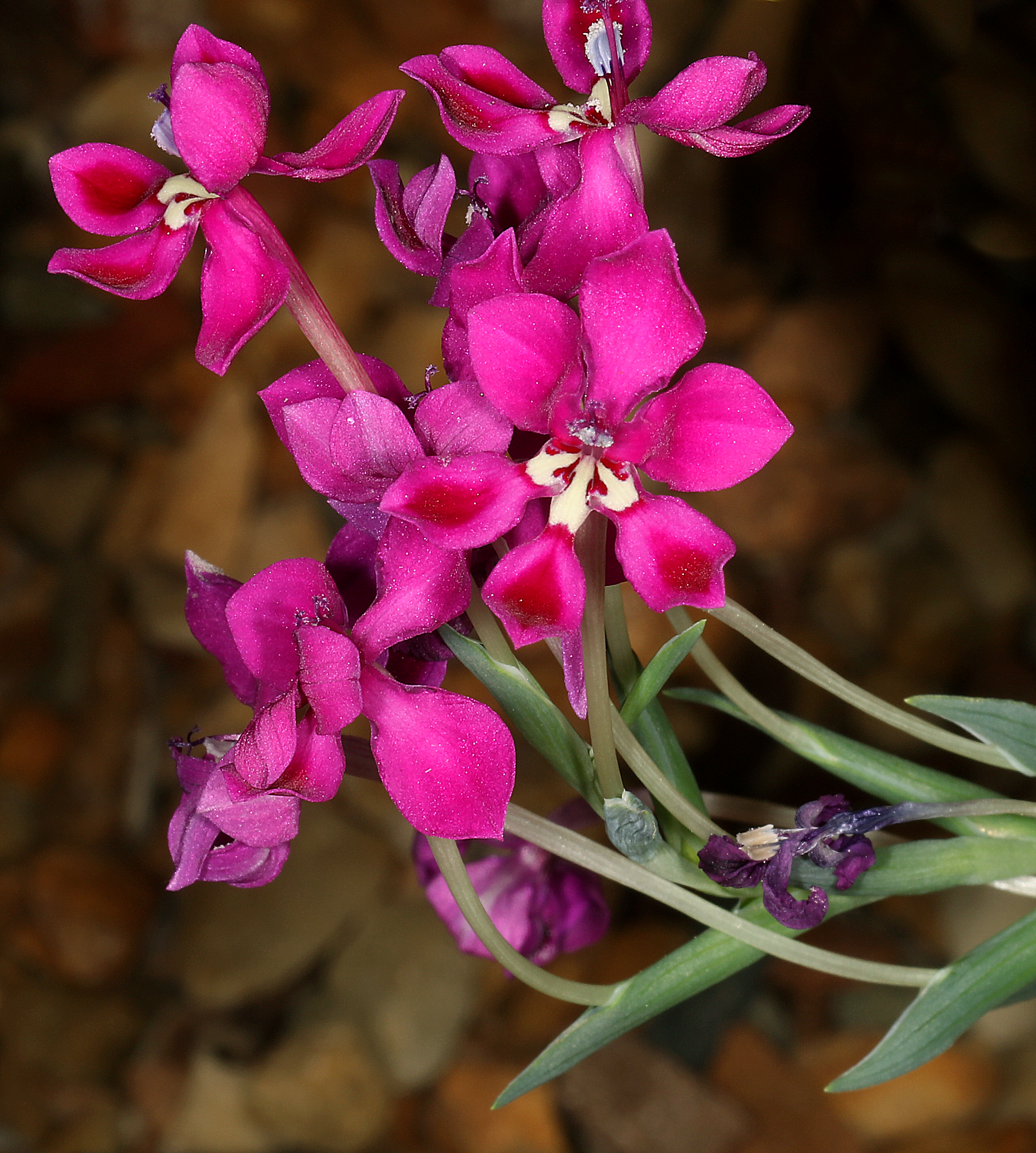

Scientific classification
- Kingdom: Plantae
- Clade: Tracheophytes
- Clade: Angiosperms
- Clade: Monocots
- Order: Asparagales
- Family: Iridaceae
- Genus: Lapeirousia
- Species: L. silenoides

Binomial name
- Lapeirousia silenoides (Jacq.) Ker Gawl., (1804)

Synonyms
- Gladiolus silenoides Jacq.; Lapeirousia speciosa Schltr.; Meristostigma silenoides (Jacq.) A.Dietr.; Ovieda silenoides (Jacq.) Spreng.; Peyrousia silenoides (Jacq.) Poir.

= Lapeirousia silenoides =

Species of flowering plant

Lapeirousia silenoides is a perennial geophyte belonging to the genus Lapeirousia. The species is endemic to the Northern Cape.
