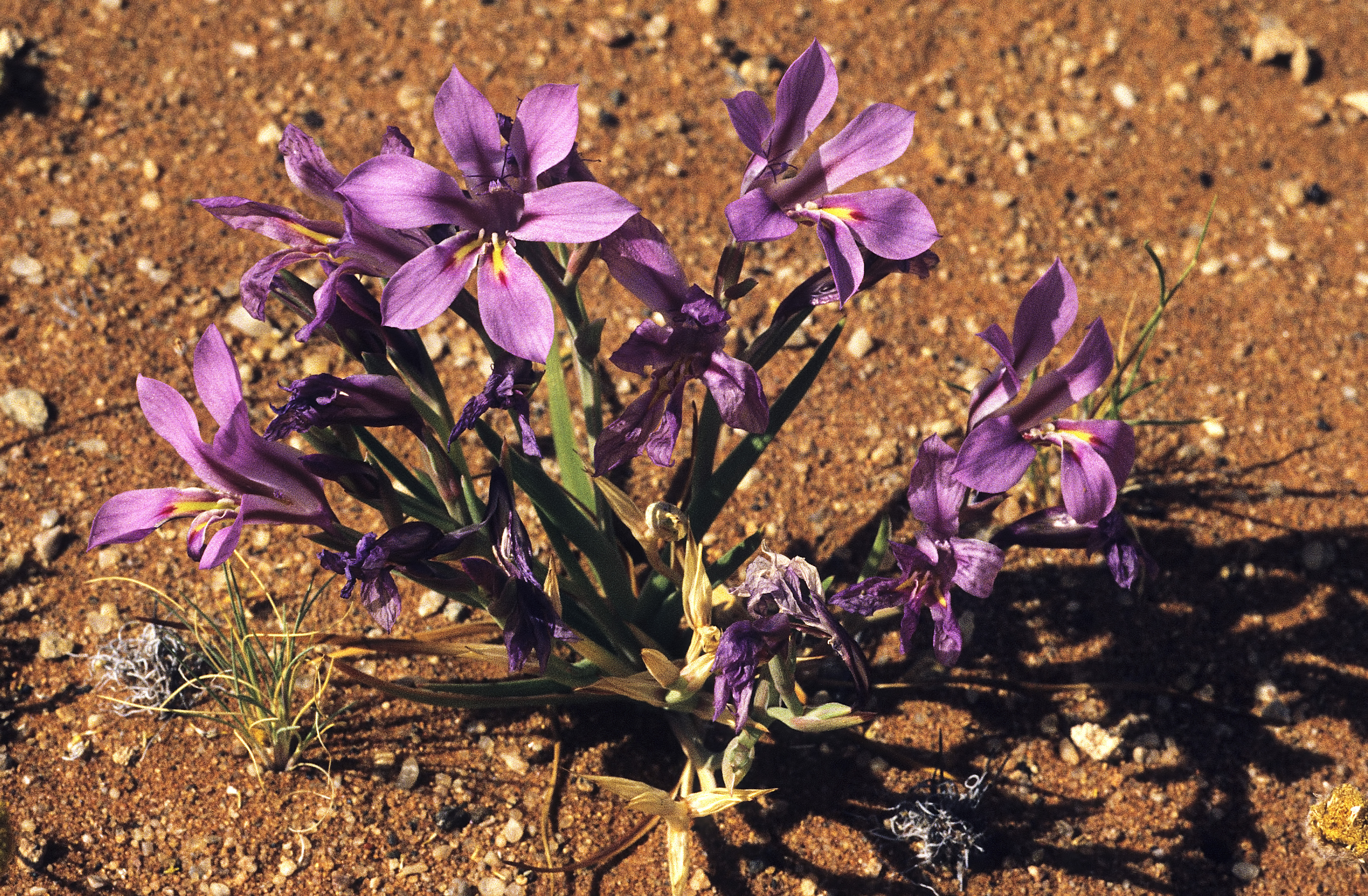

Scientific classification
- Kingdom: Plantae
- Clade: Tracheophytes
- Clade: Angiosperms
- Clade: Monocots
- Order: Asparagales
- Family: Iridaceae
- Genus: Lapeirousia
- Species: L. barklyi

Binomial name
- Lapeirousia barklyi Baker, (1892)

= Lapeirousia barklyi =

Species of flowering plant

Lapeirousia barklyi is a perennial geophyte belonging to the genus Lapeirousia and is part of the Succulent Karoo. The species is native to the Northern Cape and southern Namibia and occurs from Lüderitz to Kleinzee. The plant has a range of 6751 km². It is threatened by open pit mining activities from Alexander Bay to Kleinzee and inland in the Orange River Valley to Sendelingsdrift.
