= Lapeirousia purpurea =

Scientific classification
- Kingdom: Plantae
- Clade: Tracheophytes
- Clade: Angiosperms
- Clade: Monocots
- Order: Asparagales
- Family: Iridaceae
- Genus: Lapeirousia
- Species: L. purpurea

Binomial name
- Lapeirousia purpurea Goldblatt & J.C.Manning, (2015)

Species of flowering plant

Lapeirousia purpurea is a species of flowering plant in the family Iridaceae. It is a perennial geophyte. The species is endemic to the Western Cape.
