= Lapeirousia littoralis =

Scientific classification
- Kingdom: Plantae
- Clade: Tracheophytes
- Clade: Angiosperms
- Clade: Monocots
- Order: Asparagales
- Family: Iridaceae
- Genus: Lapeirousia
- Species: L. littoralis

Binomial name
- Lapeirousia littoralis Baker, (1878)

Species of flowering plant

Lapeirousia littoralis is a perennial geophyte belonging to the genus Lapeirousia. The species is native to Angola, Botswana, Mozambique, Namibia, South Africa, Zambia and Zimbabwe. In South Africa, the plant occurs in northern Namaqualand and Bushmanland.
