= Lapeirousia spinosa =

Scientific classification
- Kingdom: Plantae
- Clade: Tracheophytes
- Clade: Angiosperms
- Clade: Monocots
- Order: Asparagales
- Family: Iridaceae
- Genus: Lapeirousia
- Species: L. spinosa

Binomial name
- Lapeirousia spinosa (Goldblatt) Goldblatt & J.C.Manning, (1994)

Synonyms
- Lapeirousia divaricata var. spinosa Goldblatt

Species of flowering plant

Lapeirousia spinosa is a perennial geophyte belonging to the genus Lapeirousia and is part of the Succulent Karoo. The species is endemic to the Northern Cape, it is a tuberous geophyte and grows primarily in the desert or dry shrubland biome. . The plant is threatened by overgrazing and possible mining activities in the Richtersveld.
