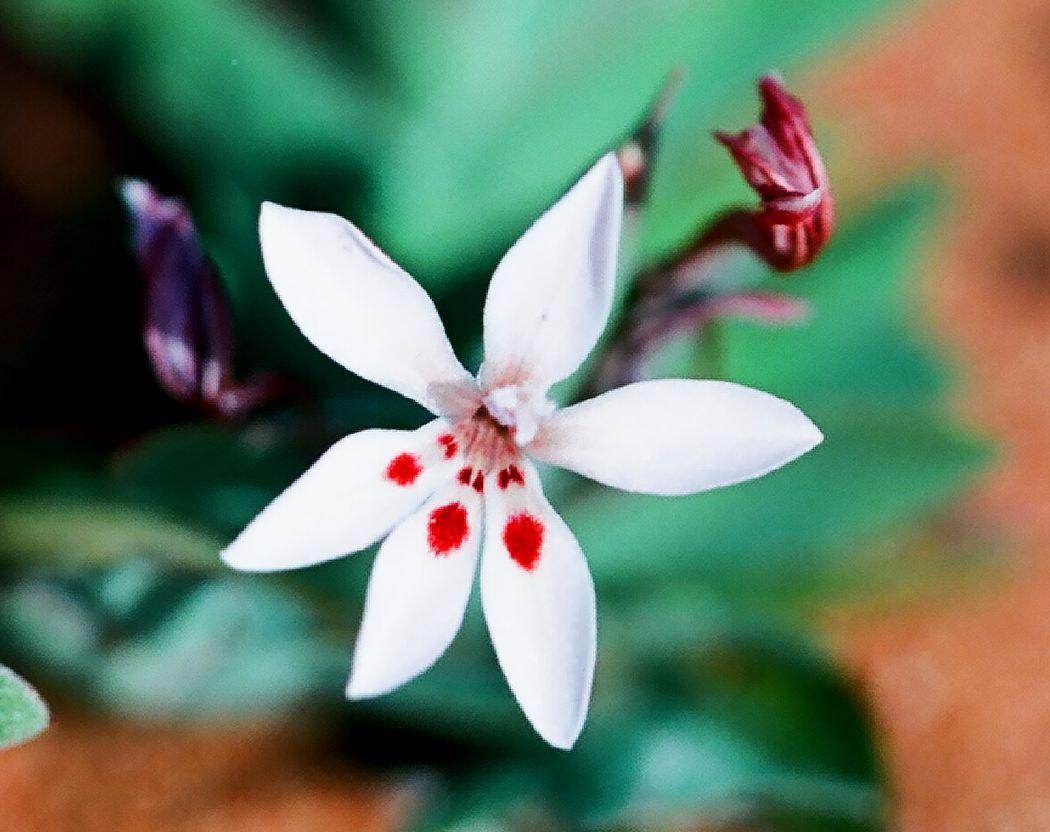

Conservation status
- Least Concern (SANBI Red List)

Scientific classification
- Kingdom: Plantae
- Clade: Tracheophytes
- Clade: Angiosperms
- Clade: Monocots
- Order: Asparagales
- Family: Iridaceae
- Genus: Lapeirousia
- Species: L. arenicola

Binomial name
- Lapeirousia arenicola Schltr.

= Lapeirousia arenicola =

Flowering plant endemic to the Cape Provinces

Lapeirousia arenicola is a species of flowering plant in the genus Lapeirousia. It is endemic to the Northern Cape and Western Cape of South Africa.

== Conservation status ==
Lapeirousia arenicola is classified as Least Concern as the population trend is stable.
