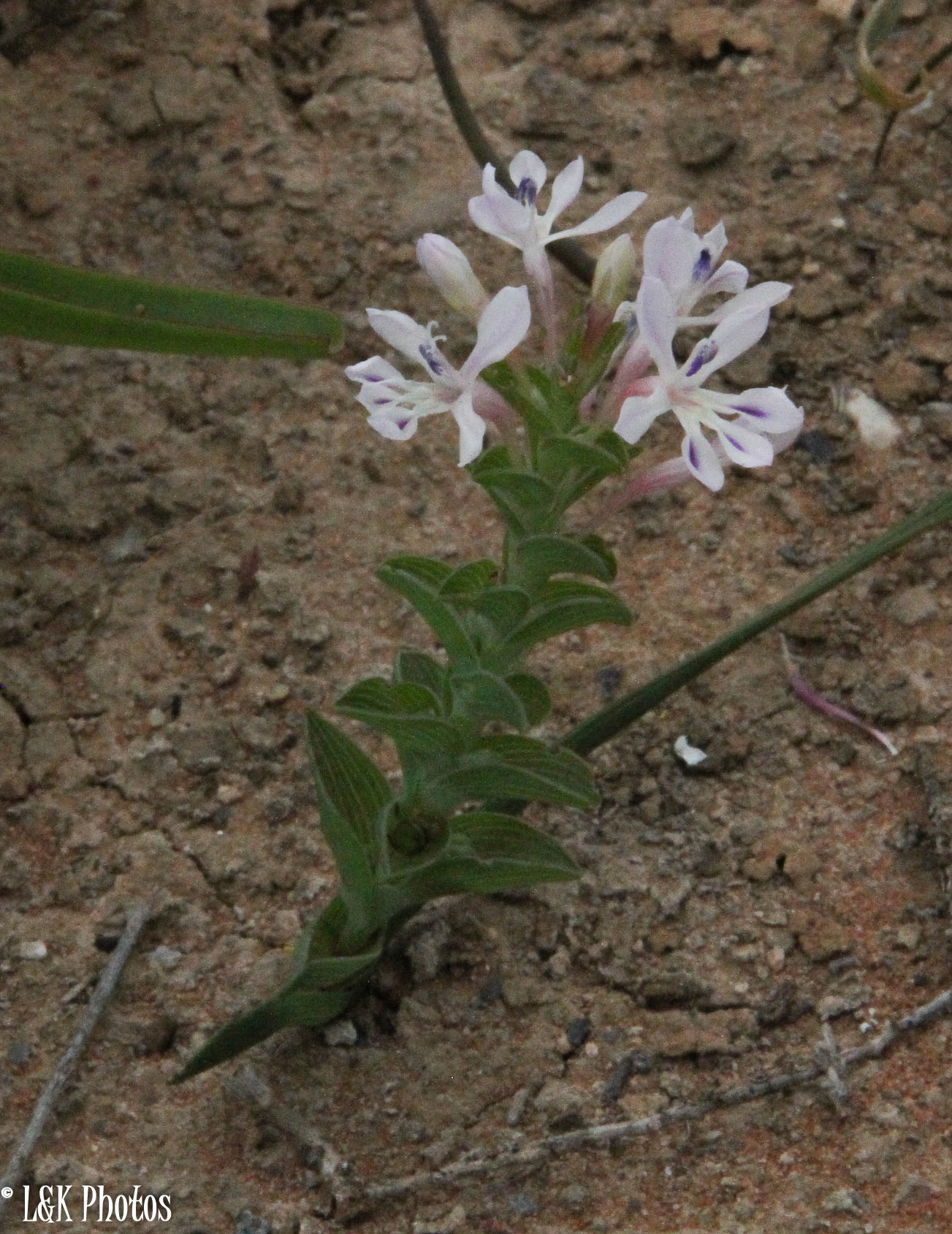

Scientific classification
- Kingdom: Plantae
- Clade: Tracheophytes
- Clade: Angiosperms
- Clade: Monocots
- Order: Asparagales
- Family: Iridaceae
- Genus: Lapeirousia
- Species: L. angustifolia

Binomial name
- Lapeirousia angustifolia Schltr.

= Lapeirousia angustifolia =

Species of flowering plant

Lapeirousia angustifolia, the short pyramid kabong, is a perennial geophyte belonging to the genus Lapeirousia. The species is endemic to the Western Cape.
