= Lapeirousia exilis =

Scientific classification
- Kingdom: Plantae
- Clade: Tracheophytes
- Clade: Angiosperms
- Clade: Monocots
- Order: Asparagales
- Family: Iridaceae
- Genus: Lapeirousia
- Species: L. exilis

Binomial name
- Lapeirousia exilis Goldblatt, (1972)

Species of flowering plant

Lapeirousia exilis is a perennial geophyte belonging to the genus Lapeirousia. The species is endemic to the Northern Cape.
