= Lapeirousia dolomitica =

Scientific classification
- Kingdom: Plantae
- Clade: Tracheophytes
- Clade: Angiosperms
- Clade: Monocots
- Order: Asparagales
- Family: Iridaceae
- Genus: Lapeirousia
- Species: L. dolomitica

Binomial name
- Lapeirousia dolomitica Dinter, (1931)

Species of flowering plant

Lapeirousia dolomitica is a perennial geophyte belonging to the genus Lapeirousia. The species is native to the Northern Cape and Namibia. It occurs in southern Namibia, the Richtersveld and northern Namaqualand.
