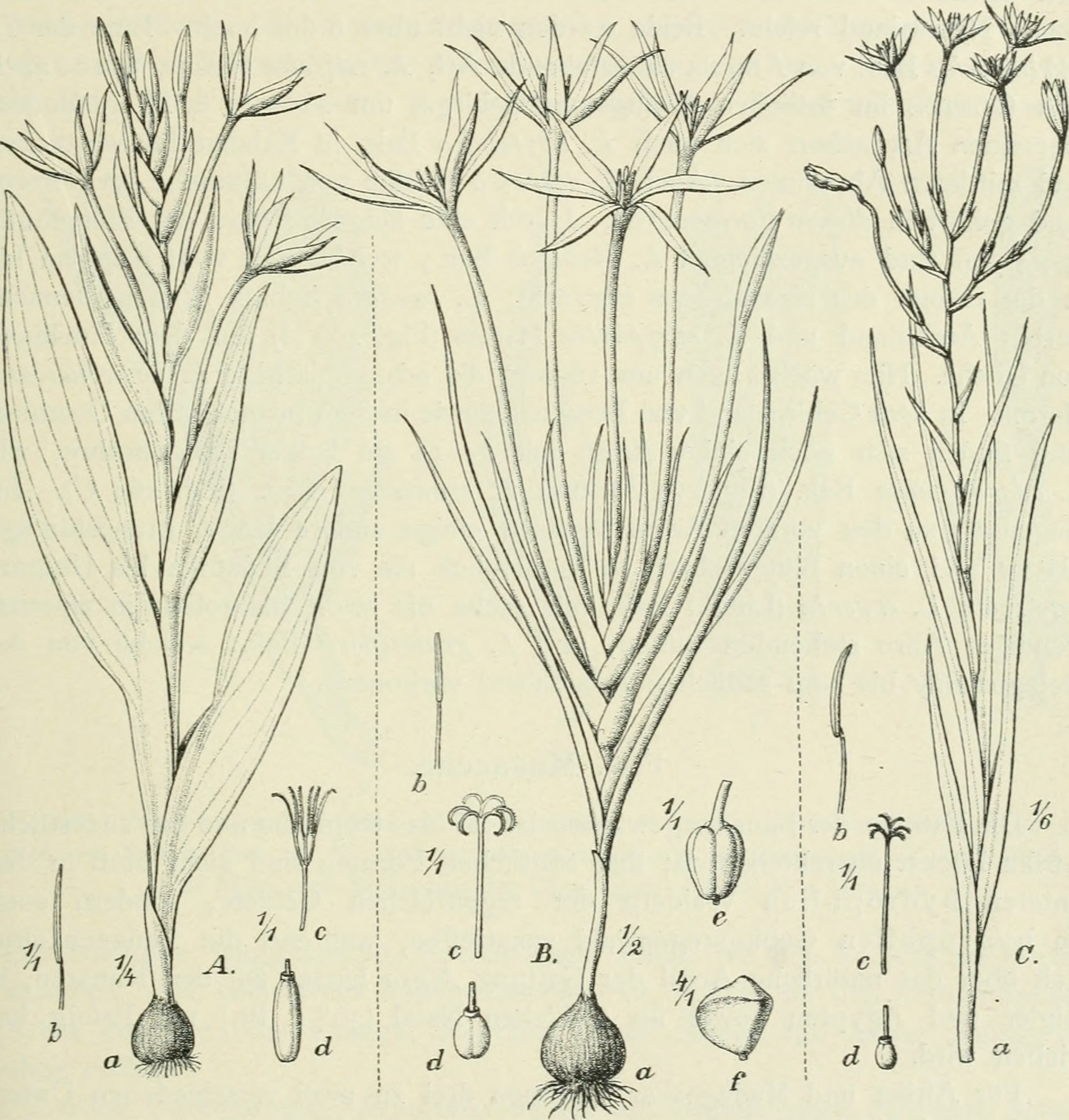

Scientific classification
- Kingdom: Plantae
- Clade: Tracheophytes
- Clade: Angiosperms
- Clade: Monocots
- Order: Asparagales
- Family: Iridaceae
- Genus: Lapeirousia
- Species: L. odoratissima

Binomial name
- Lapeirousia odoratissima Baker, (1878)

Synonyms
- Lapeirousia congesta Rendle; Lapeirousia juttae Dinter; Lapeirousia stenoloba Vaupel; Psilosiphon odoratissimus Welw.

= Lapeirousia odoratissima =

Species of flowering plant

Lapeirousia odoratissima is a perennial geophyte belonging to the genus Lapeirousia. The species is native to Angola, Botswana, Democratic Republic of the Congo, Malawi, Namibia, Tanzania, Zambia and Zimbabwe.
