= Lapeirousia verecunda =

Scientific classification
- Kingdom: Plantae
- Clade: Tracheophytes
- Clade: Angiosperms
- Clade: Monocots
- Order: Asparagales
- Family: Iridaceae
- Genus: Lapeirousia
- Species: L. verecunda

Binomial name
- Lapeirousia verecunda Goldblatt, (1972)

Species of flowering plant

Lapeirousia verecunda is a perennial geophyte belonging to the genus Lapeirousia and is part of the renosterveld. The species is endemic to the Northern Cape and occurs on the escarpment of Spektakelberg, west of Springbok. The plant is favored by crop cultivation, road construction and quarrying.
