= Lapeirousia divaricata =

Scientific classification
- Kingdom: Plantae
- Clade: Tracheophytes
- Clade: Angiosperms
- Clade: Monocots
- Order: Asparagales
- Family: Iridaceae
- Genus: Lapeirousia
- Species: L. divaricata

Binomial name
- Lapeirousia divaricata Baker, (1876)

Synonyms
- Chasmatocallis macowanii R.C.Foster; Gladiolus setifolius L.f.; Lapeirousia setifolia (L.f.) N.E.Br.

Species of flowering plant

Lapeirousia divaricata is a perennial geophyte belonging to the genus Lapeirousia. The species is endemic to the Northern Cape and the Western Cape.
