= Lapeirousia plicata =

Scientific classification
- Kingdom: Plantae
- Clade: Tracheophytes
- Clade: Angiosperms
- Clade: Monocots
- Order: Asparagales
- Family: Iridaceae
- Genus: Lapeirousia
- Species: L. plicata

Binomial name
- Lapeirousia plicata (Jacq.) Diels, (1930)

Synonyms
- Galaxia plicata Jacq.; Lapeirousia fasciculata Ker Gawl.; Ovieda fasciculata (Ker Gawl.) Spreng.; Peyrousia fasciculata (Ker Gawl.) Sweet

Species of flowering plant

Lapeirousia plicata is a perennial geophyte belonging to the genus Lapeirousia. The species is native to Botswana, Namibia and South Africa. In South Africa, the species occurs in the North West, Northern Cape and Free State.
