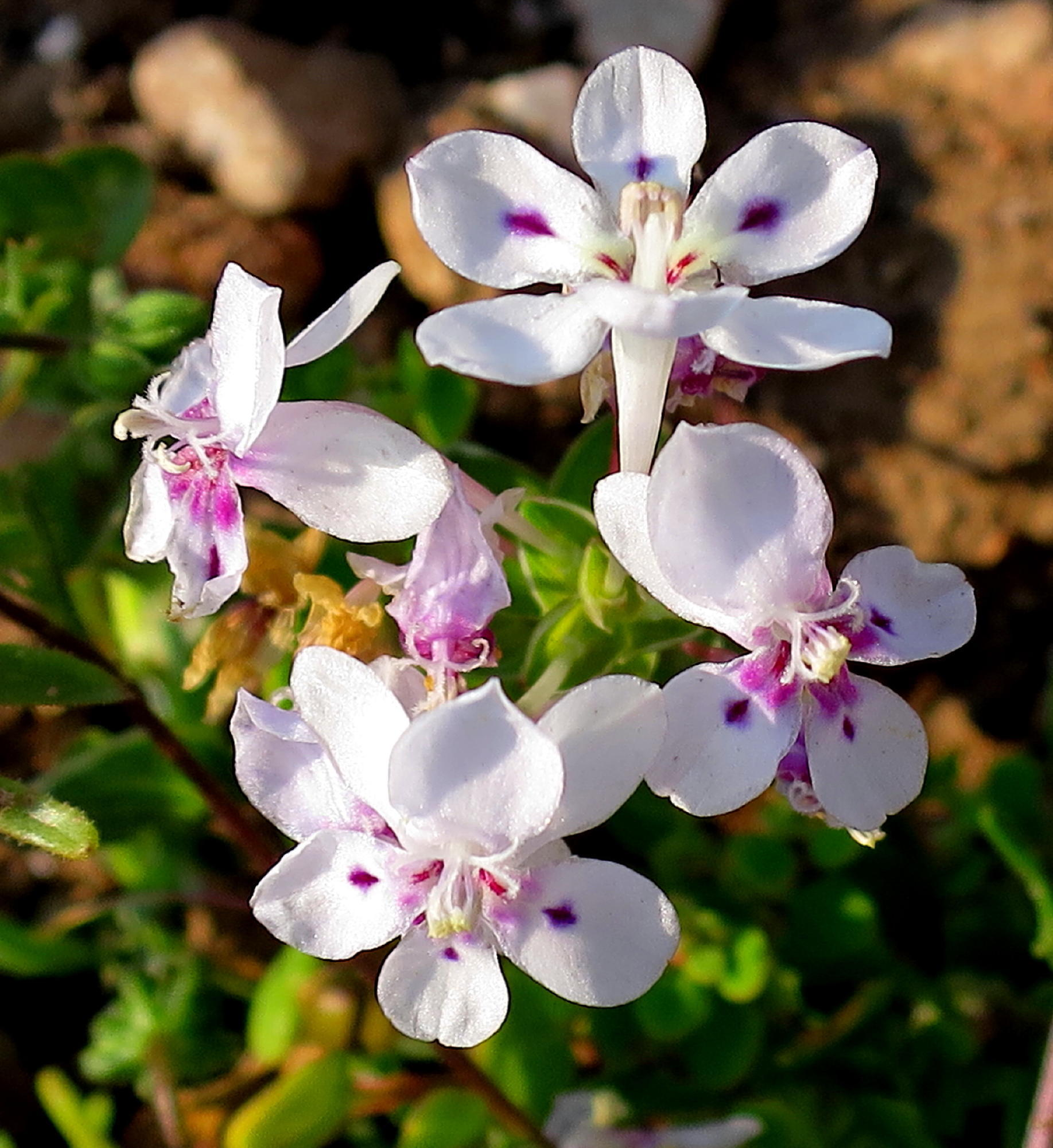
- Pale pyramid kabong

Conservation status
- Least Concern (SANBI Red List)

Scientific classification
- Kingdom: Plantae
- Clade: Tracheophytes
- Clade: Angiosperms
- Clade: Monocots
- Order: Asparagales
- Family: Iridaceae
- Genus: Lapeirousia
- Species: L. pyramidalis

Binomial name
- Lapeirousia pyramidalis Jacq.

Synonyms
- Ixia pyramidalis Lam.; Witsenia pyramidalis (Lam.) Pers.

= Lapeirousia pyramidalis =

Flowering plant endemic to the Cape Provinces

Lapeirousia pyramidalis is a species of geophyte in the genus Lapeirousia. It is endemic to the Cape Provinces of South Africa. It is also known as the pyramid kabong.

== Distribution ==
Lapeirousia pyramidalis subsp. pyramidalis is found in the Northern Cape and Western Cape . Lapeirousia pyramidalis subsp. regalis is found in a small area in the Western Cape.

== Subspecies ==
There are 2 infraspecific named subspecies of pyramidalis:

- Lapeirousia pyramidalis subsp. pyramidalis (Lam.) Goldblatt - known as the pale pyramid kabong
- Lapeirousia pyramidalis subsp. regalis Goldblatt & J.C.Manning - known as the purple pyramid kabong

== Conservation status ==
Lapeirousia pyramidalis is classified as Least Concern.

== Gallery ==
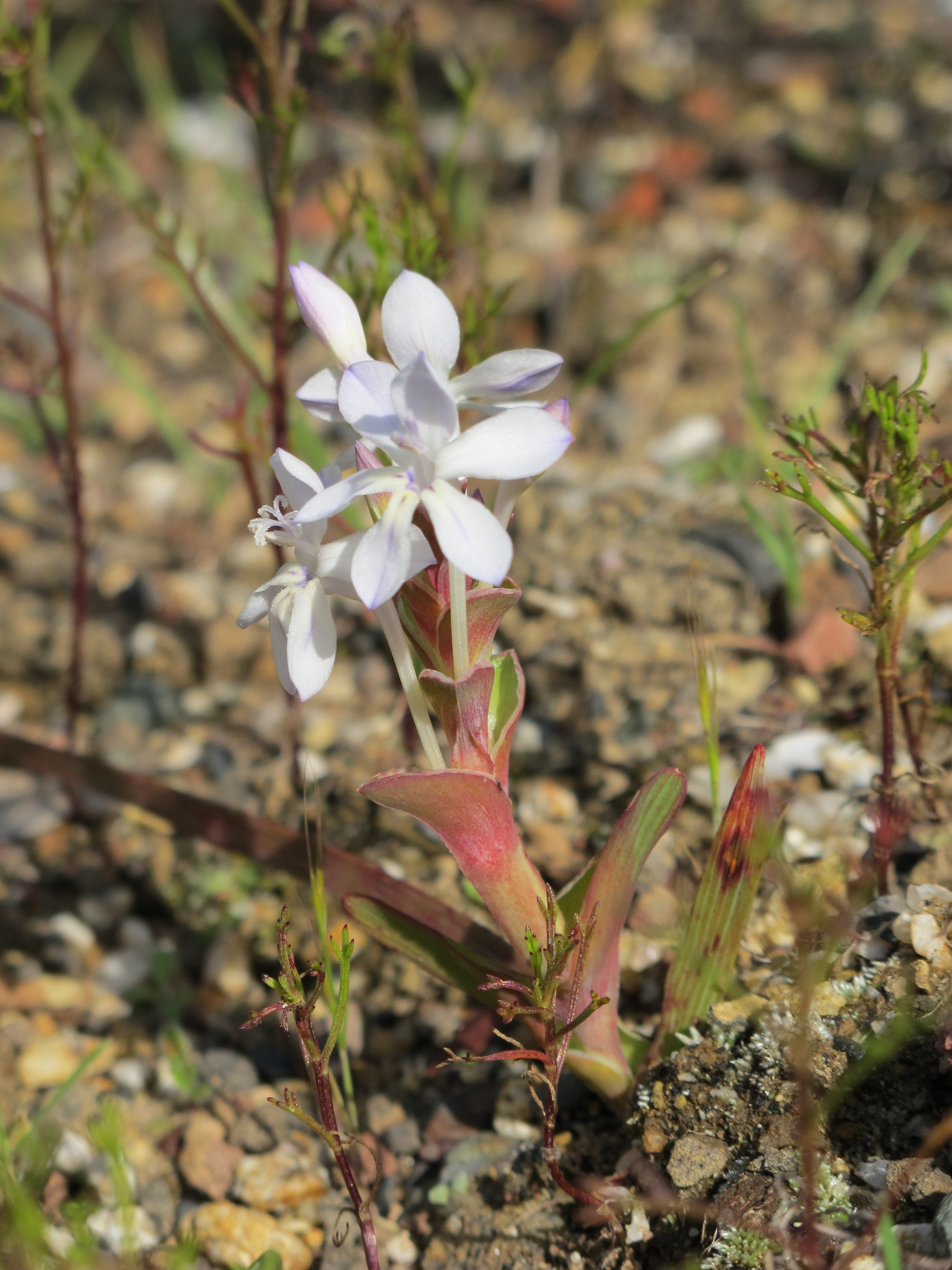

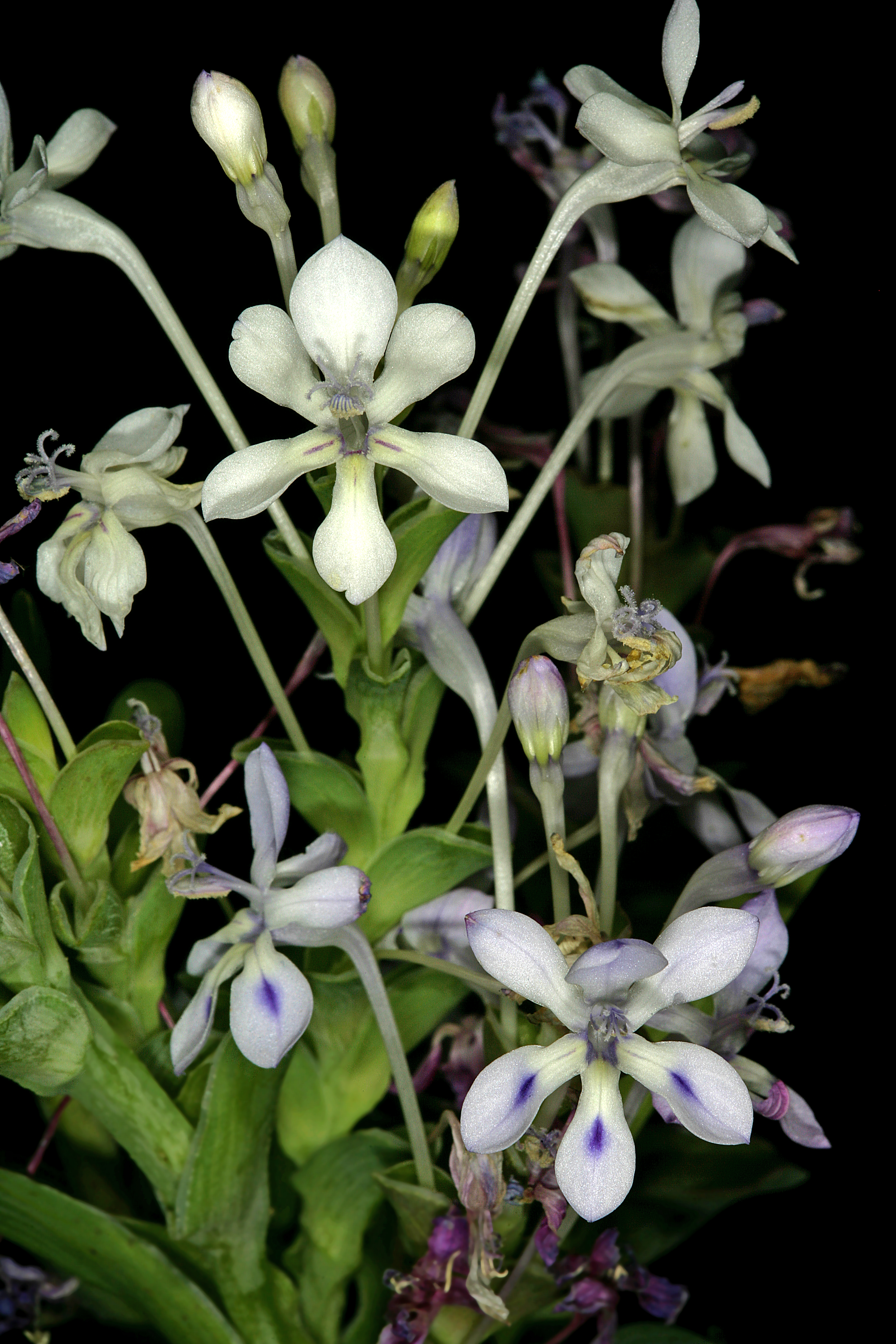

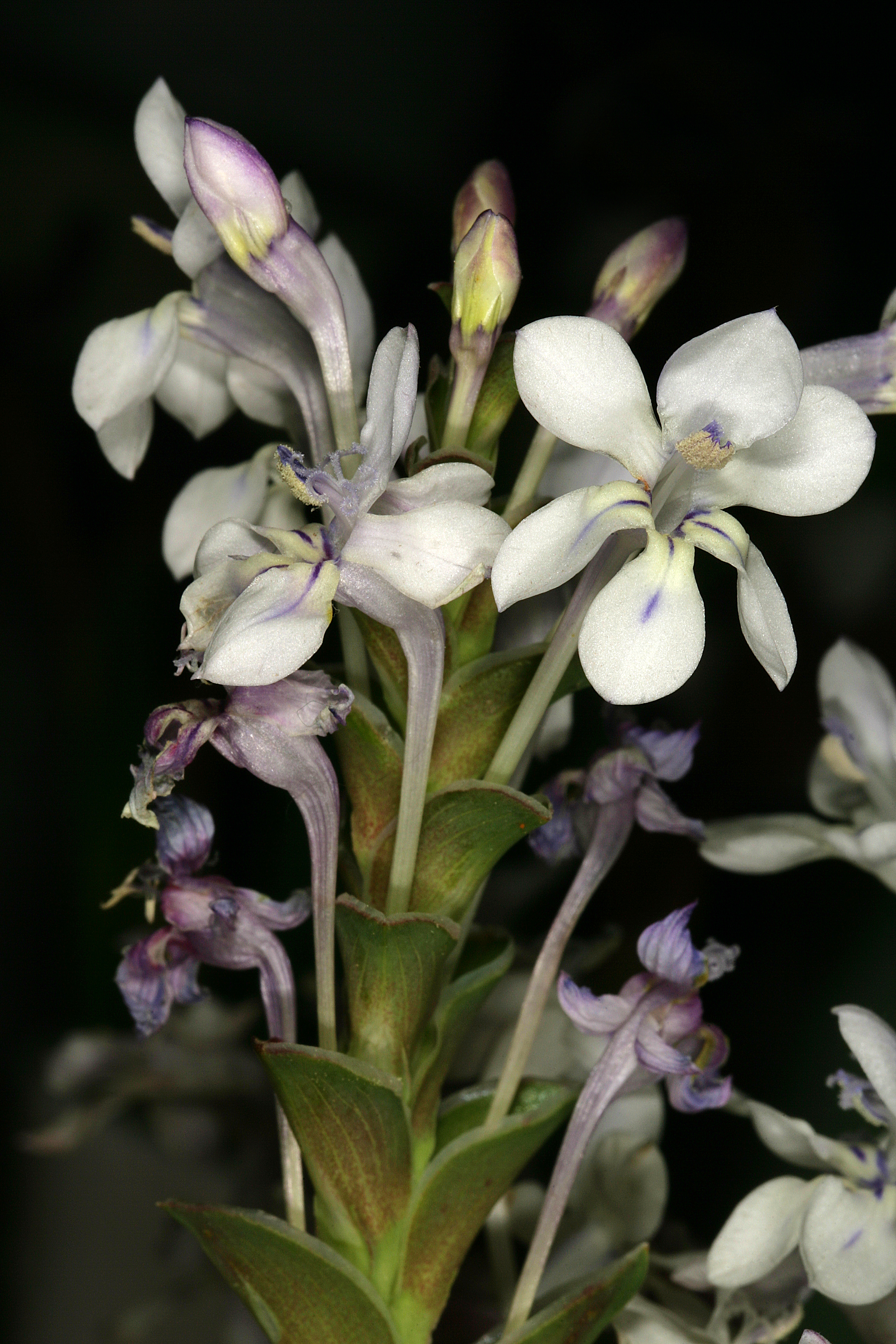

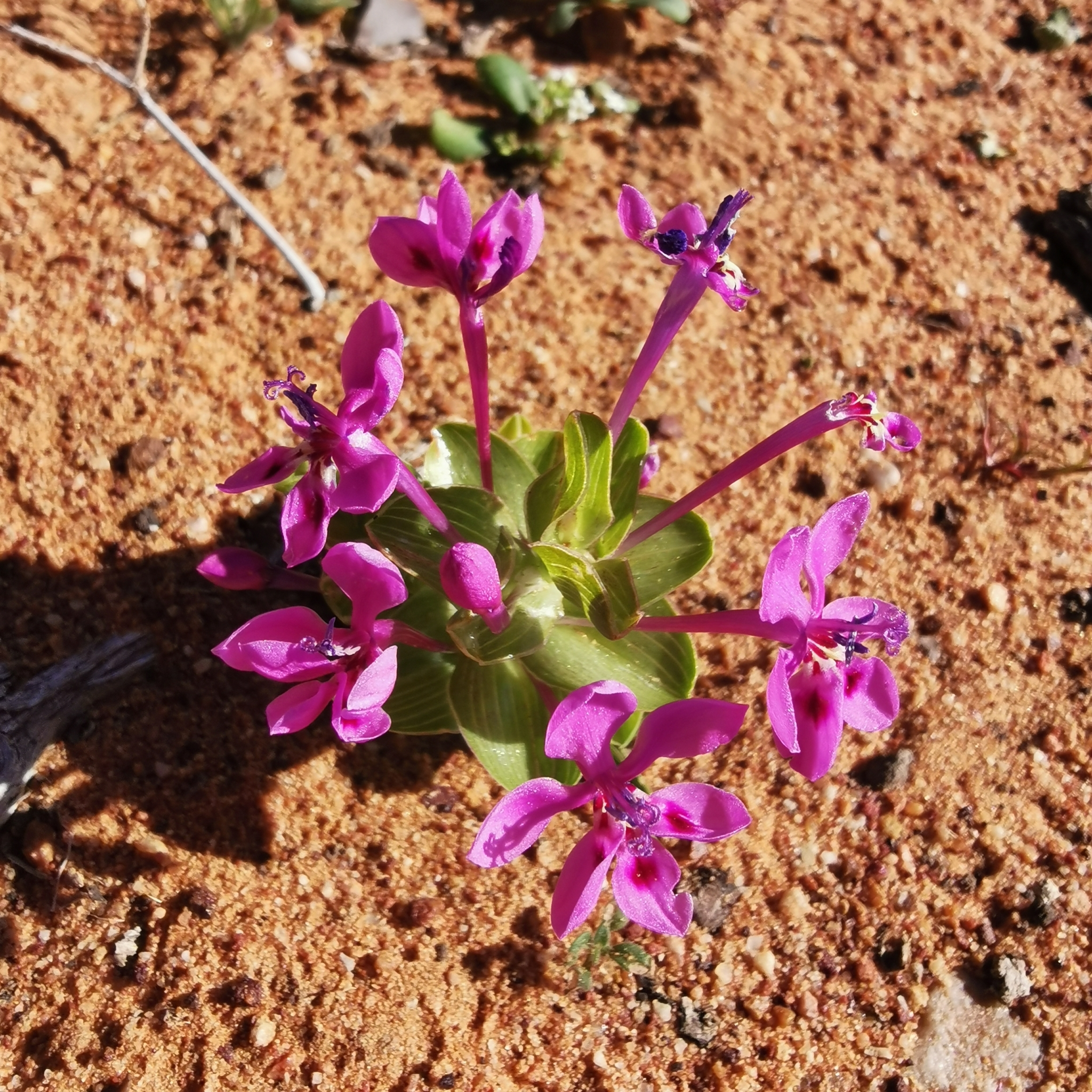
