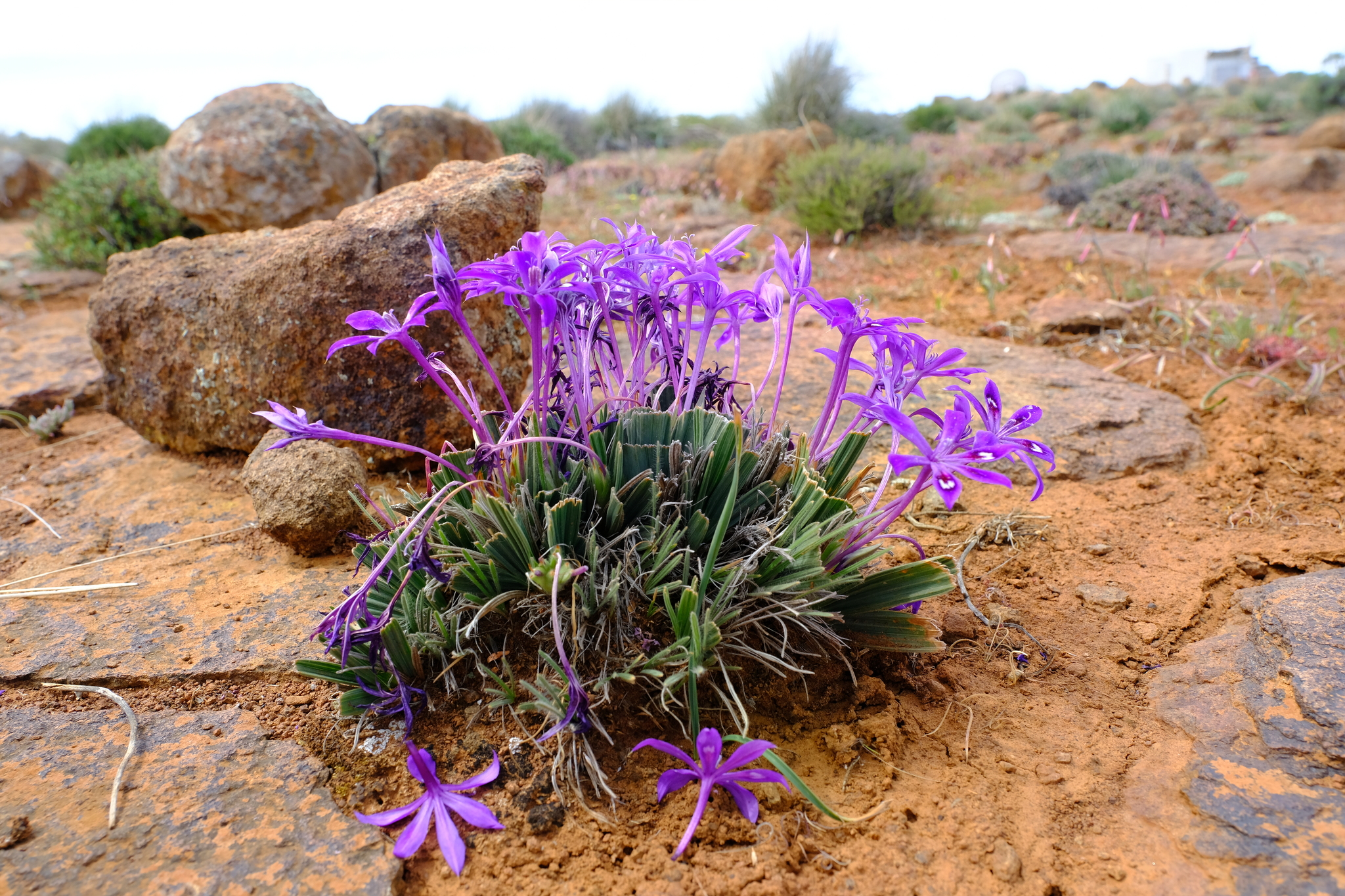

Scientific classification
- Kingdom: Plantae
- Clade: Tracheophytes
- Clade: Angiosperms
- Clade: Monocots
- Order: Asparagales
- Family: Iridaceae
- Genus: Babiana
- Species: B. praemorsa

Binomial name
- Babiana praemorsa Goldblatt & J.C.Manning, (2004)

= Babiana praemorsa =

Species of flowering plant

Babiana praemorsa is a species of geopytic, perennial flowering plant in the family Iridaceae. The species is endemic to the Northern Cape and is part of the succulent Karoo vegetation. It occurs at Calvinia, from the Hantamberg to Bloukrans Pass. There are five subpopulations and the plant is considered rare.
