= Philippe-Isidore Picot de Lapeyrouse =

French scientist (1744–1818)

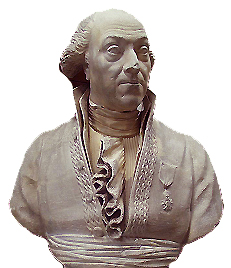
Philippe-Isidore Picot de Lapeyrouse

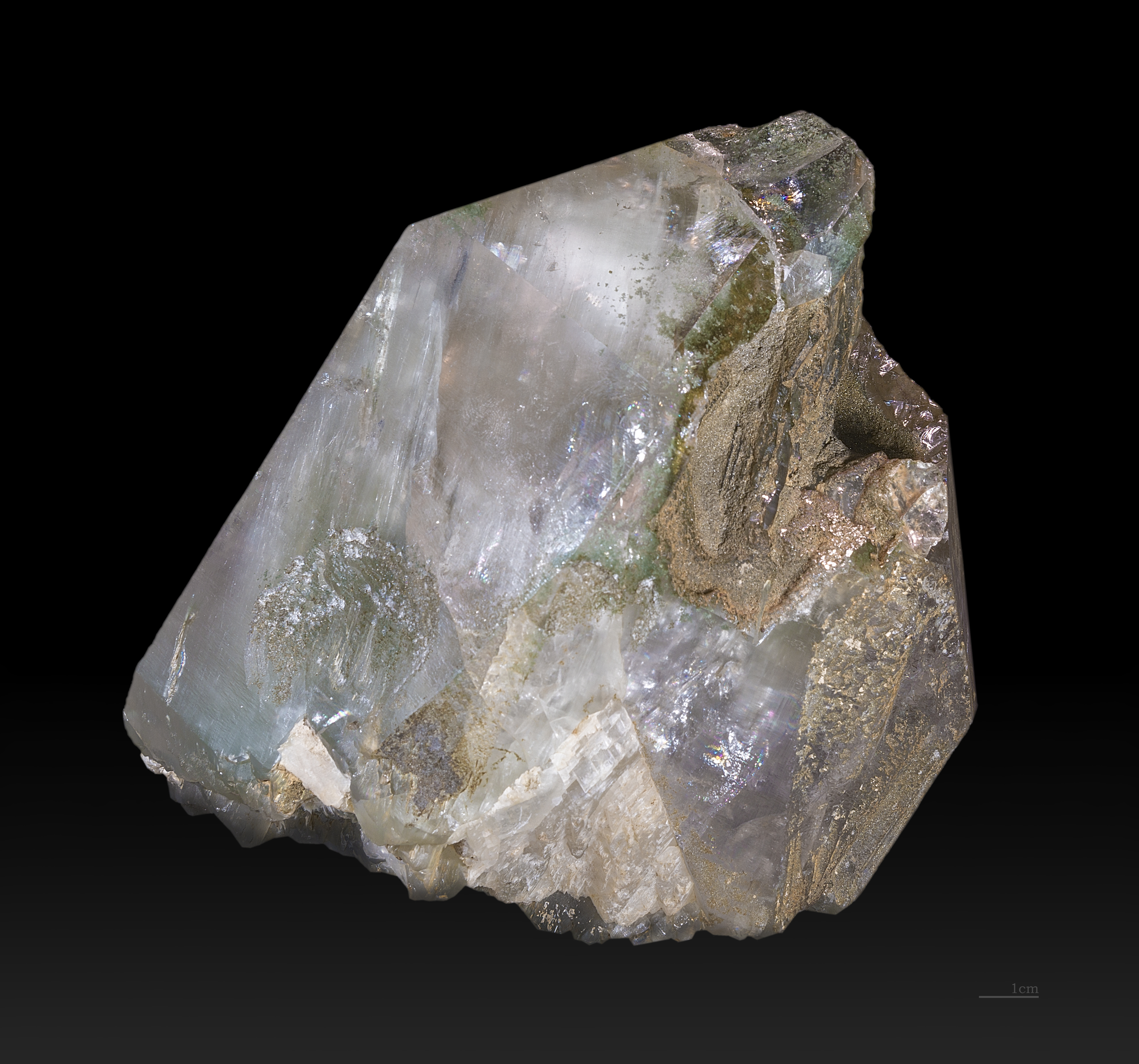
Quartz prase. Found by Picot de Lapeyrouse and Dolomieu in 1793

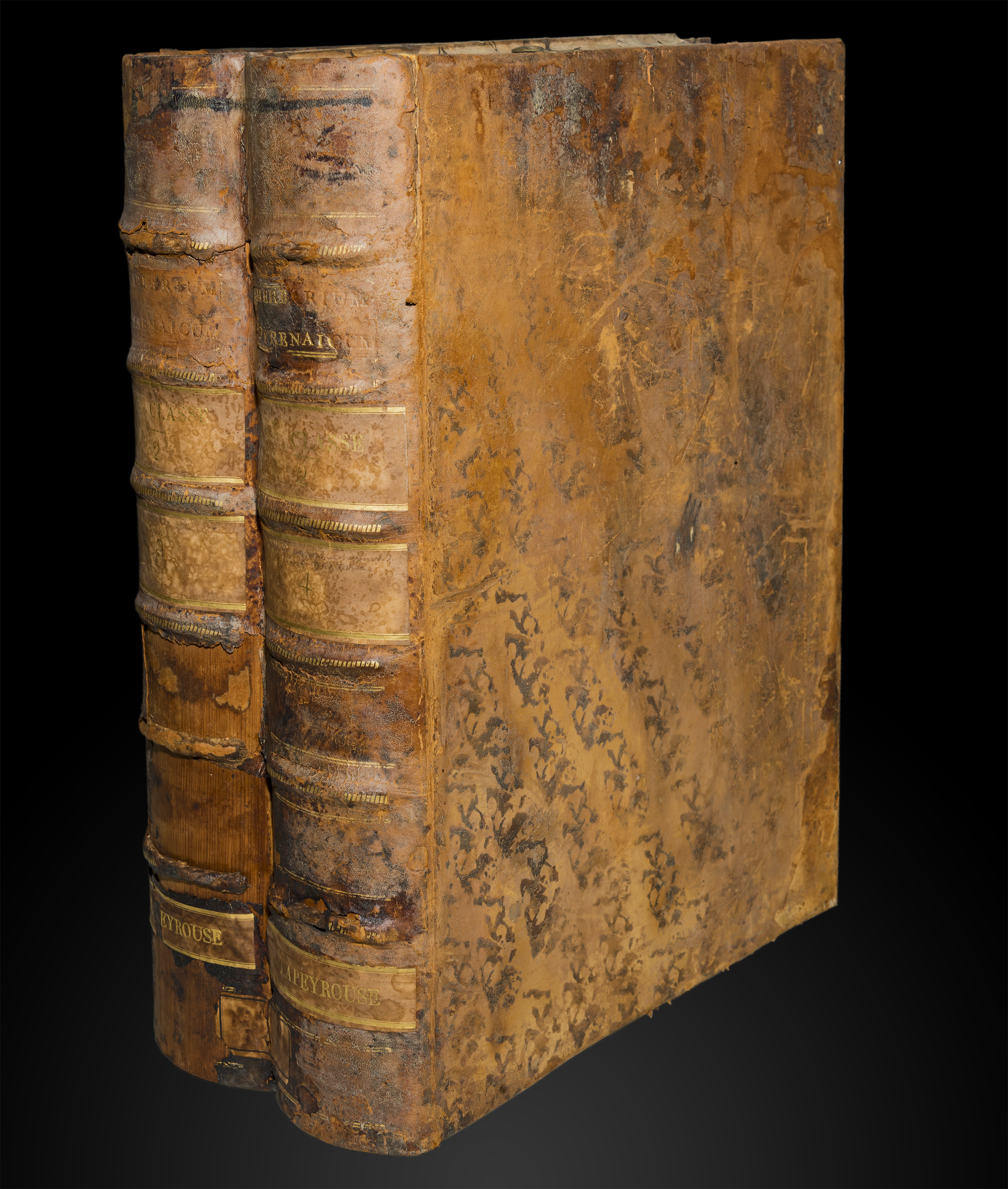
Volumes of the herbarium, of Philippe Picot de Lapeyrouse

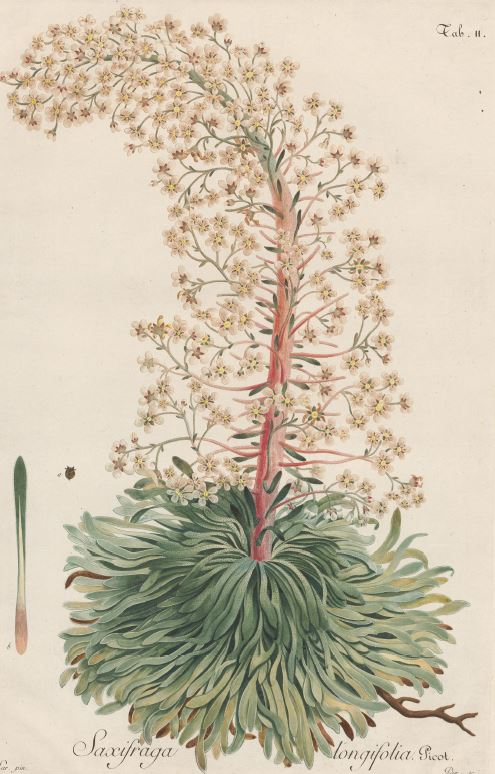
Saxifraga longifolia

Philippe-Isidore Picot de Lapeyrouse or La Peirouse, Baron de Lapeyrouse (20 October 1744 in Toulouse – 18 October 1818 in château de Lapeyrouse, Haute-Garonne) was a French naturalist.

He was particularly interested in the flora and fauna of the Pyrenees. After the revolution, he became the first professor of natural history in Toulouse and his collections, from 1796, were housed in the former Carmelite Monastery of Toulouse which went on to become the Muséum de l'Histoire Naturelle de Toulouse.

In 1782 he was elected a foreign member of the Royal Swedish Academy of Sciences. In 1800 he was mayor of Toulouse.

The genus Lapeirousia in the family Iridaceae was named after him by his friend Pierre André Pourret, and not, as is sometimes erroneously stated, after the French mariner, Jean-François de Galaup, comte de Lapérouse.

== Works ==
- Mémoires d'histoire naturelle : Description de quelques crystallisations. Histoire naturelle du Lagopède. Description de quelques plantes des Pyrénées (1774-1778)
- Mémoire sur la mortalité des ormes dans les environs de Toulouse (1787)
- Figures de la flore des Pyrénées, avec des descriptions (1795) (available for download)
- Tables méthodiques des mammifères et des oiseaux observés dans le département de la Haute-Garonne (an VII)
- Histoire abrégée des plantes des Pyrénées et Itinéraire des botanistes dans ces montagnes (1813)
- Considérations sur les lycées, surtout par rapport aux départements (1815) Imprimé par le Conseil général de la Haute-Garonne et envoyé aux députés.
- Supplément à l'Histoire abrégée des plantes des Pyrénées (1818)
- Extraits de sa correspondance avec D. Villars (1861)

== Bibliography ==
- Pierre Raymond, Essai de zoologie, soutenu le 7 fructidor, an X. Thèse sous la présidence de Picot-Lapeyrouse.
