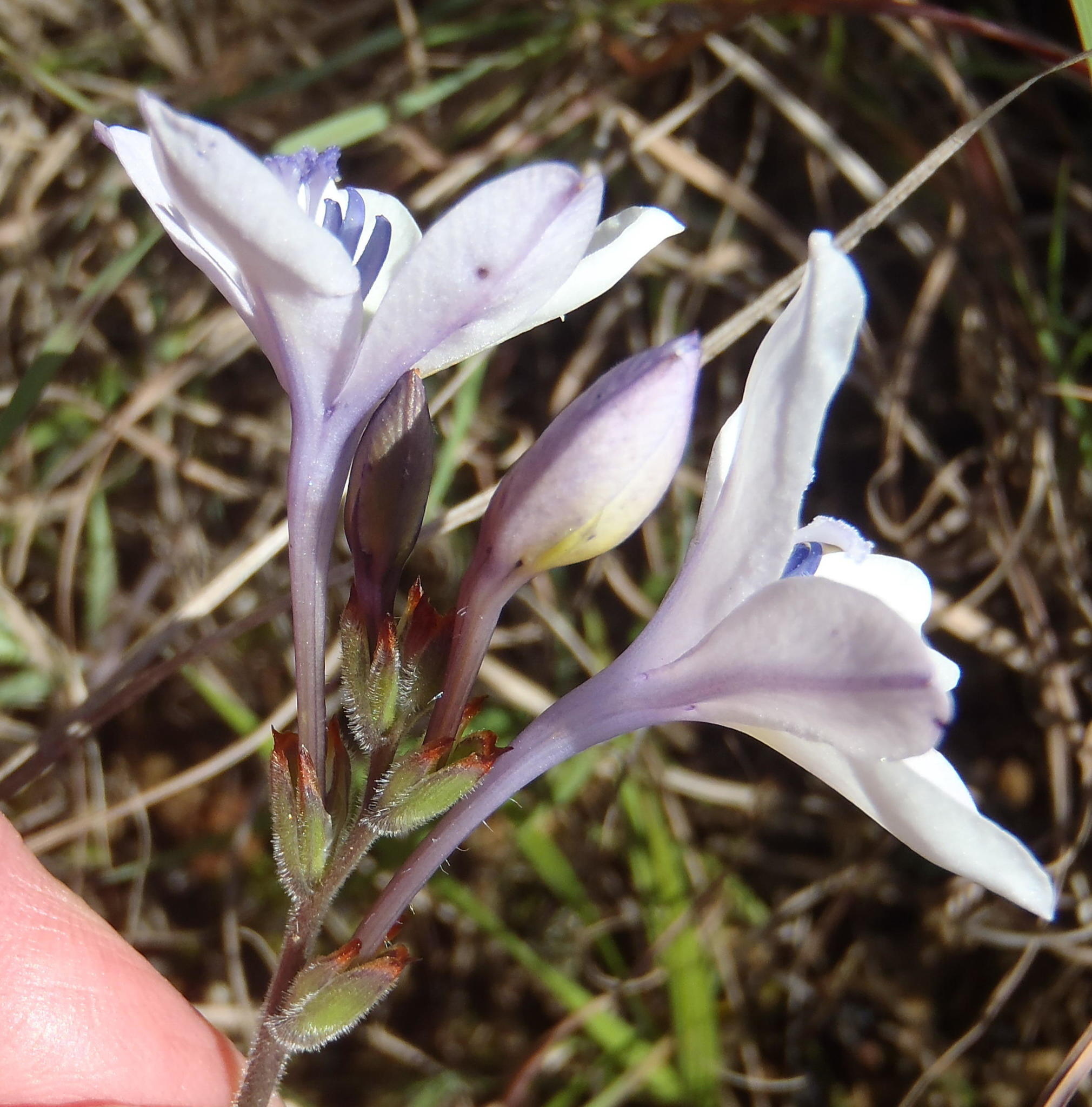

Scientific classification
- Kingdom: Plantae
- Clade: Tracheophytes
- Clade: Angiosperms
- Clade: Monocots
- Order: Asparagales
- Family: Iridaceae
- Genus: Babiana
- Species: B. patersoniae

Binomial name
- Babiana patersoniae L.Bolus, (1931)

Synonyms
- Babiana caerulescens Eckl.

= Babiana patersoniae =

Species of flowering plant

Babiana patersoniae is a perennial flowering plant and geophyte belonging to the genus Babiana and is part of the fynbos. The species is endemic to the Eastern Cape and the Western Cape.
