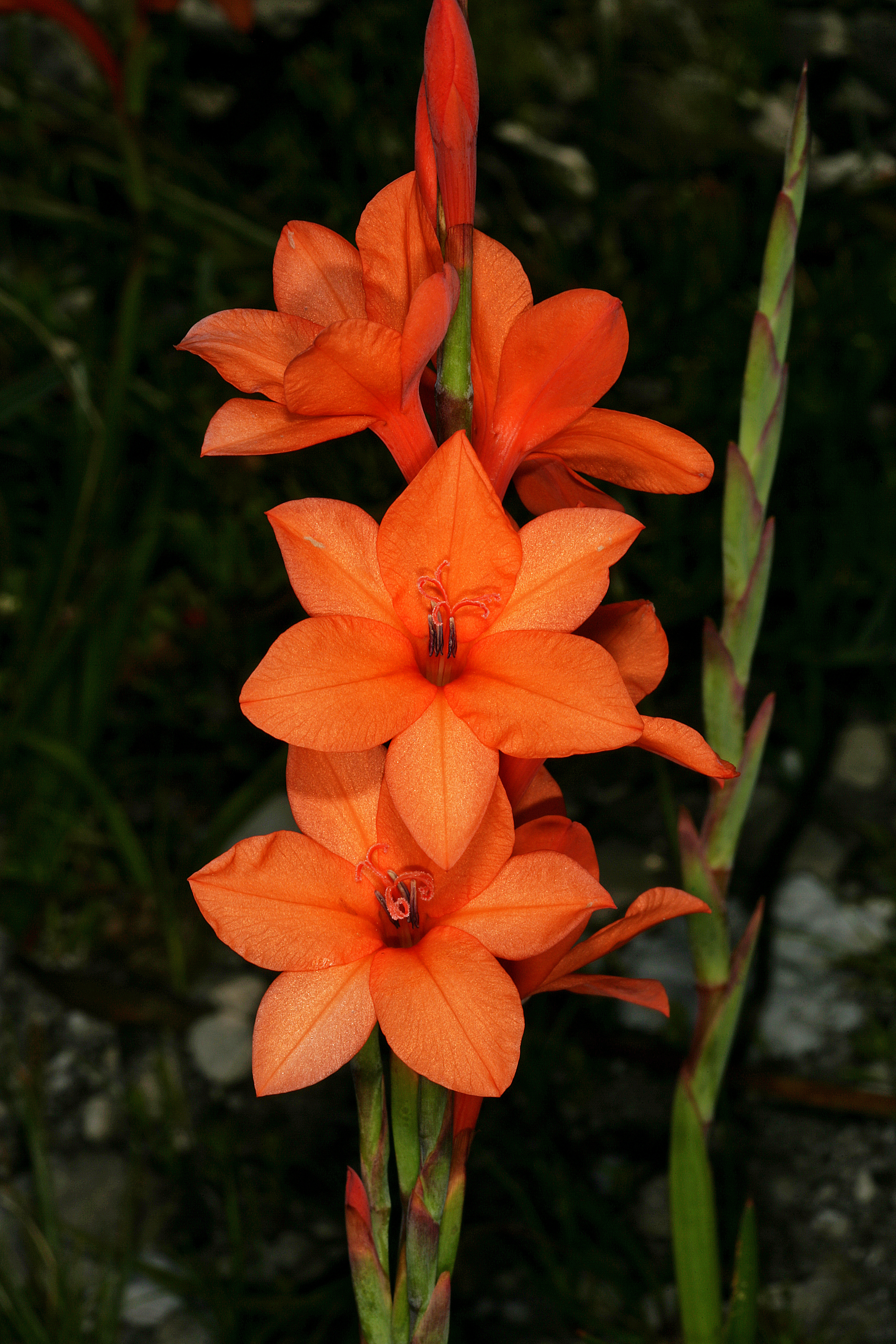

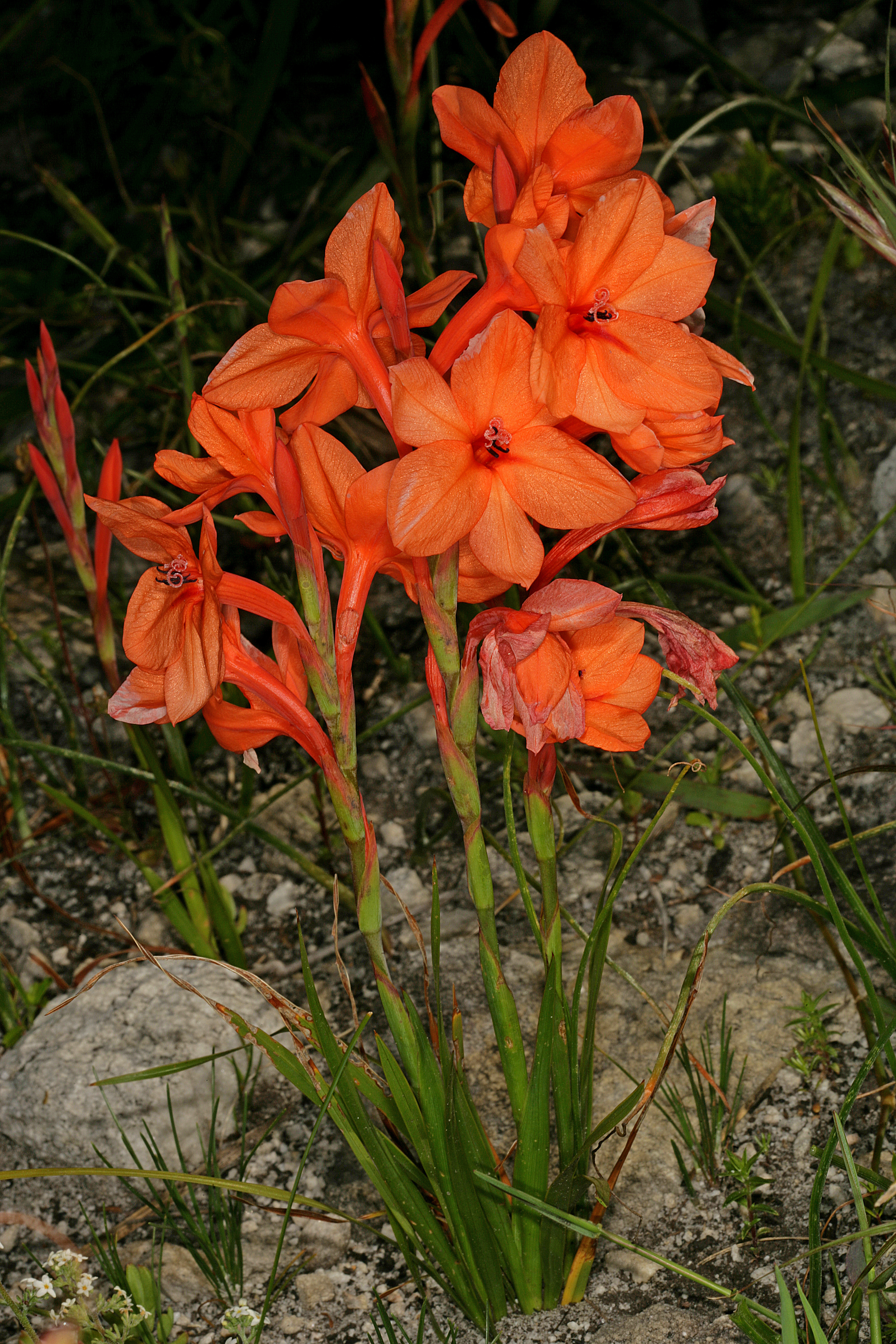

Scientific classification
- Kingdom: Plantae
- Clade: Tracheophytes
- Clade: Angiosperms
- Clade: Monocots
- Order: Asparagales
- Family: Iridaceae
- Genus: Watsonia
- Species: W. stenosiphon

Binomial name
- Watsonia stenosiphon L.Bolus

Synonyms
- Watsonia pottbergensis Eckl.

= Watsonia stenosiphon =

Species of flowering plant

Watsonia stenosiphon, the small orange watsonia, is a plant belonging to the genus Watsonia and forming part of the fynbos. The species is endemic to the Western Cape.
