= Margaret Lawder =

Irish and South African botanist known for her conservation work

Margaret Lawder Wilkinson
- Born: Margaret Lawder Wilkinson; 18 July 1899; Hillside, Yatton, Somerset, England
- Died: 16 November 1982 (aged 83); Paarl, South Africa
- Known for: Conservation and collection of plants for Kirstenbosch
- Spouse(s): Eric Stephen Dumsday; Edward Francis Lawder

Margaret Lawder (1899-1982), born Margaret Lawder Wilkinson, was a British and South African botanist known for her conservation work. She was daughter of Charles Ernest Orde Wilkinson and Edith Mary Lawder. In 1922, at the age of 22, she emigrated from Ireland to the Cape of Good Hope, South Africa, as a social worker. Margaret first married Eric Stephen Dumsday on 20 April 1926, having two daughters and a son; later divorcing in 1952.

Secondly she married Commander Edward Francis Lawder R.N., as his third wife, and they became official plant collectors for the Kirstenbosch National Botanical Garden in Cape Town. Edward took pictures of the flowers and Margaret wrote the descriptions of them.

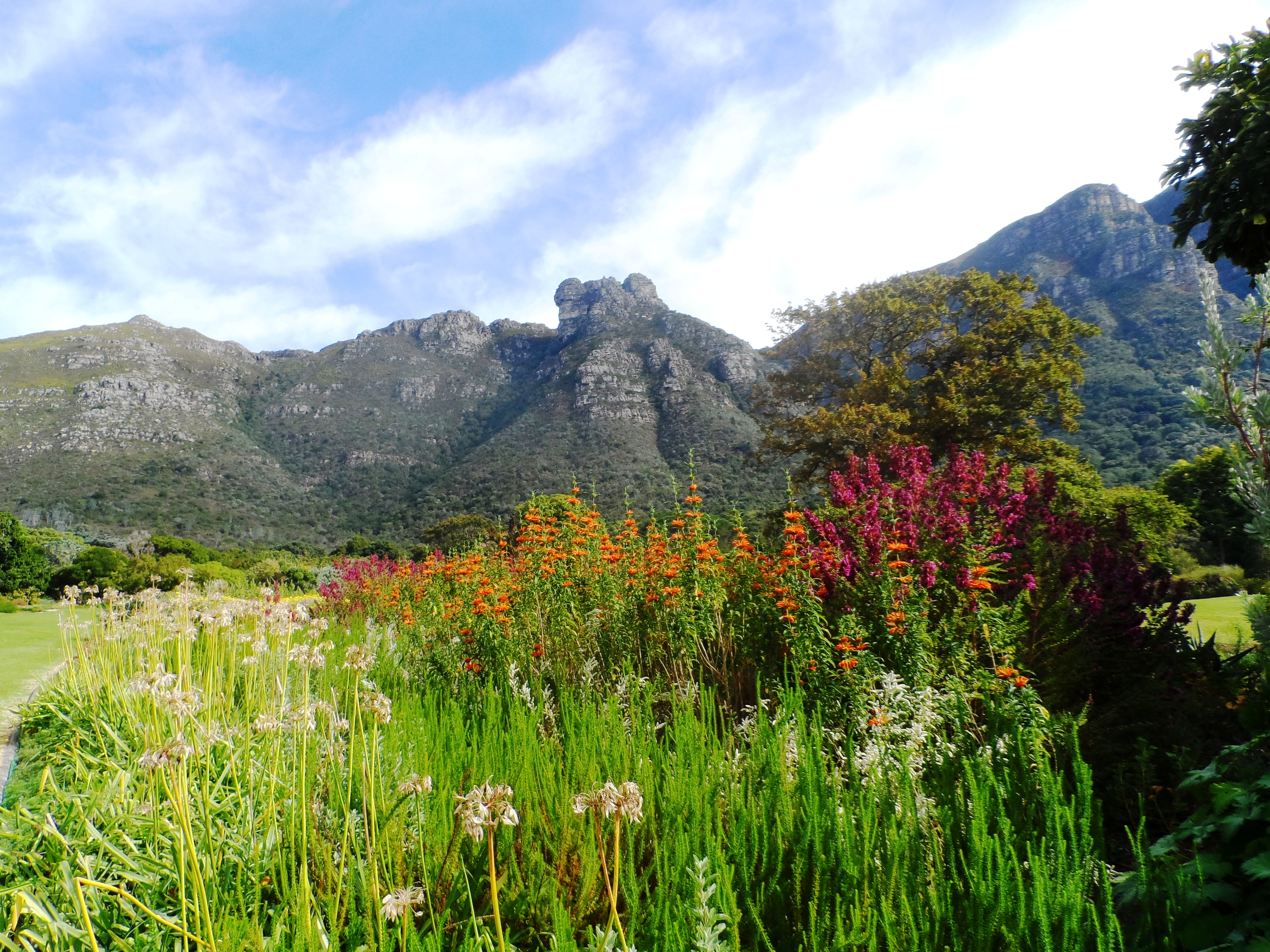
Kirstenbosch Botanical Garden (April 2013)

They contributed articles to the Journal of the Botanical Society both before and after it became Veld & Flora. They also contributed articles about Cape plants to other South African and international journals. Margaret had a regular gardening column in the Cape Times newspaper and the magazine Farmers Weekly. She was responsible for the slogan "Conservation through Cultivation".

Margaret Lawder bought Leliefontein farm in the Klein Drakenstein area in 1946. She introduced the cultivation of Watsonia marginata, a plant endemic to Leliefontein farm.

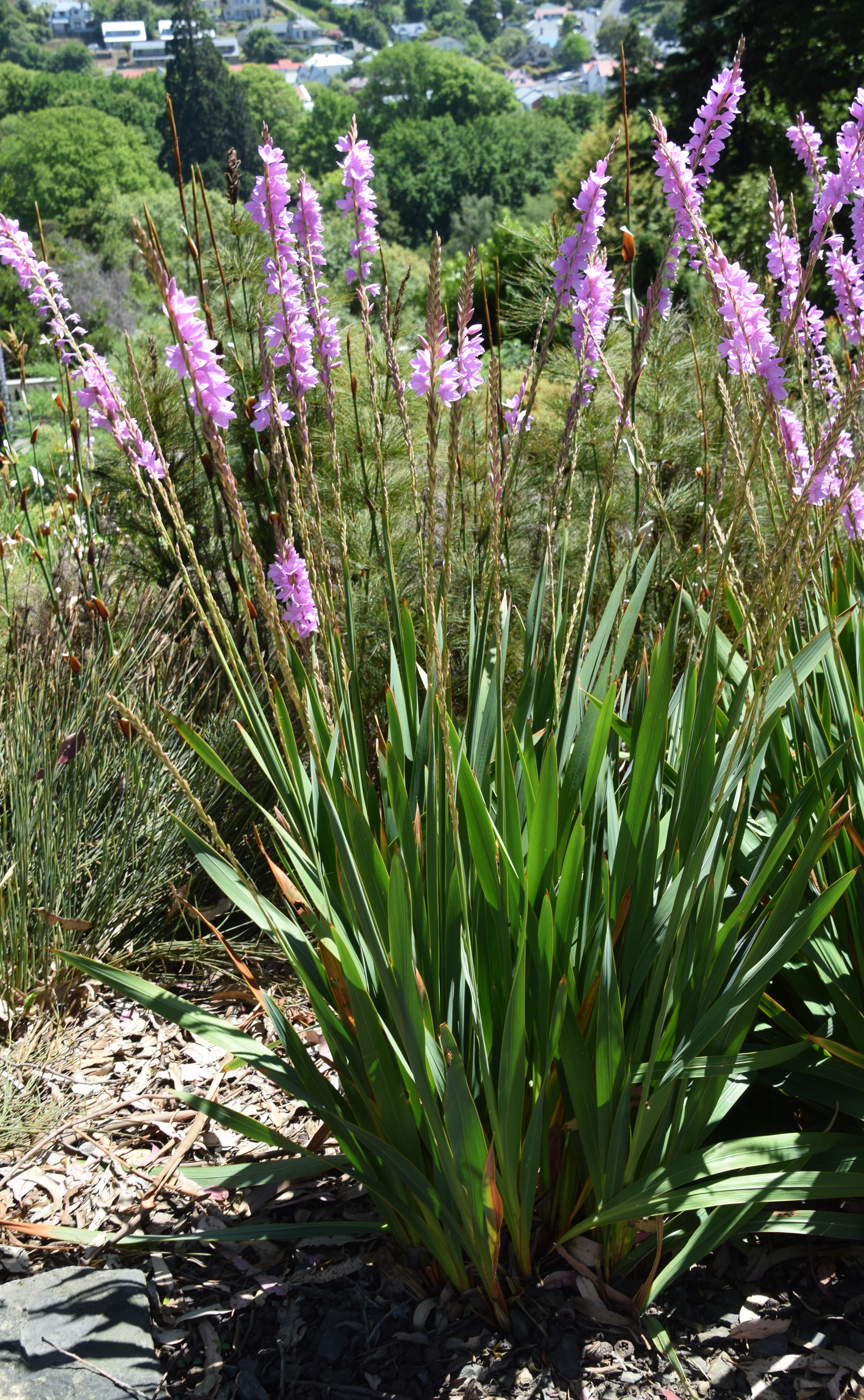
Watsonia marginata

She was one of the founding members of the Paarl Beautifying Society in 1931 when the area was overrun with alien vegetation. They established an indigenous garden in a section of the Paarl Mountain Nature Reserve, known as Meulwater Wild Flower Reserve. She was also a founding member and the first president of the Country Garden Club in the Paarl district, which post she held for seven years.

Margaret was also involved in the foundation of Maitland Cottage Homes. This organisation cares for children who have to spend months in plaster casts, but who cannot stay at home. She was also involved in the first birth control clinic in the Cape Peninsula.

She was actively involved in botany until her death in 1982.
