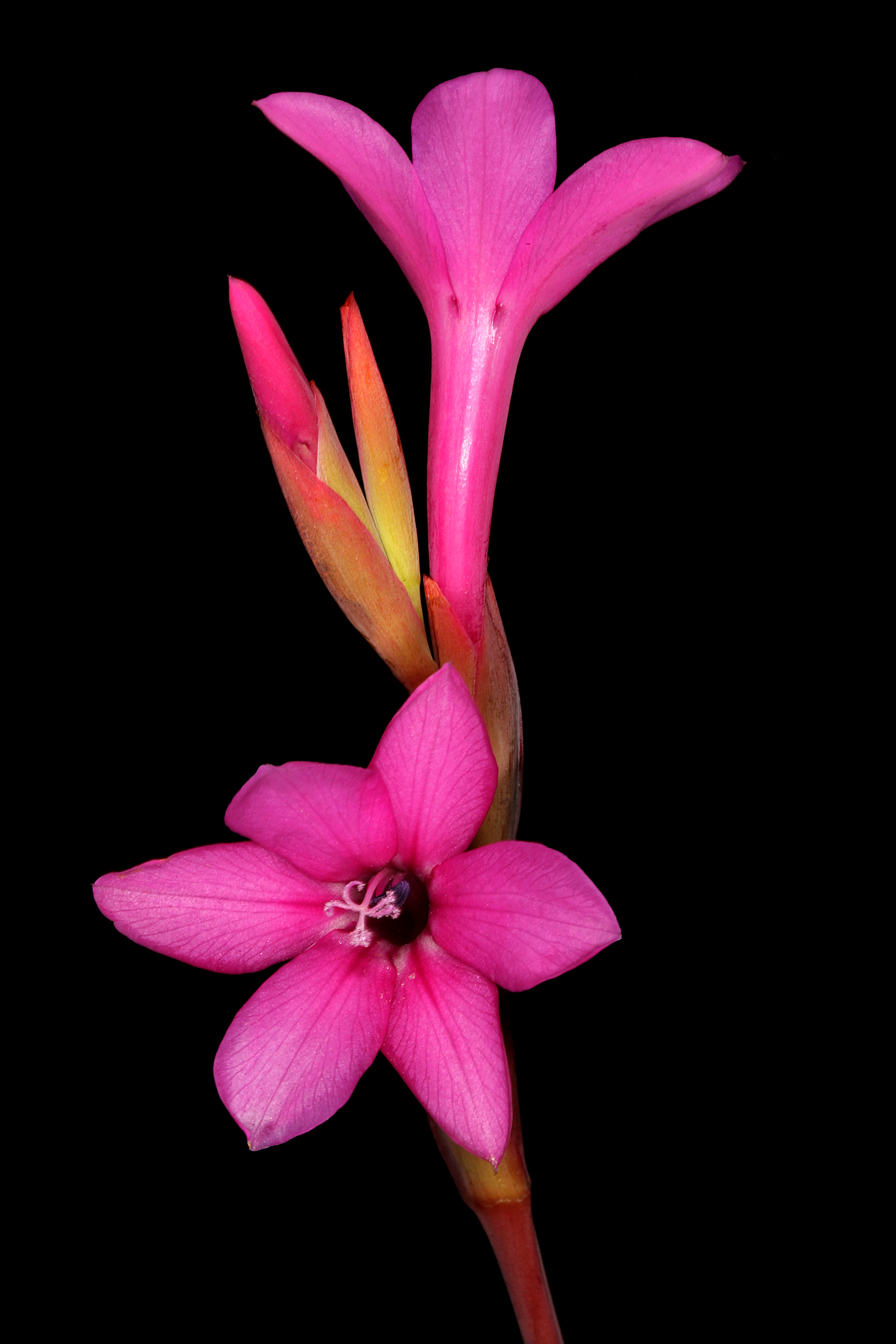

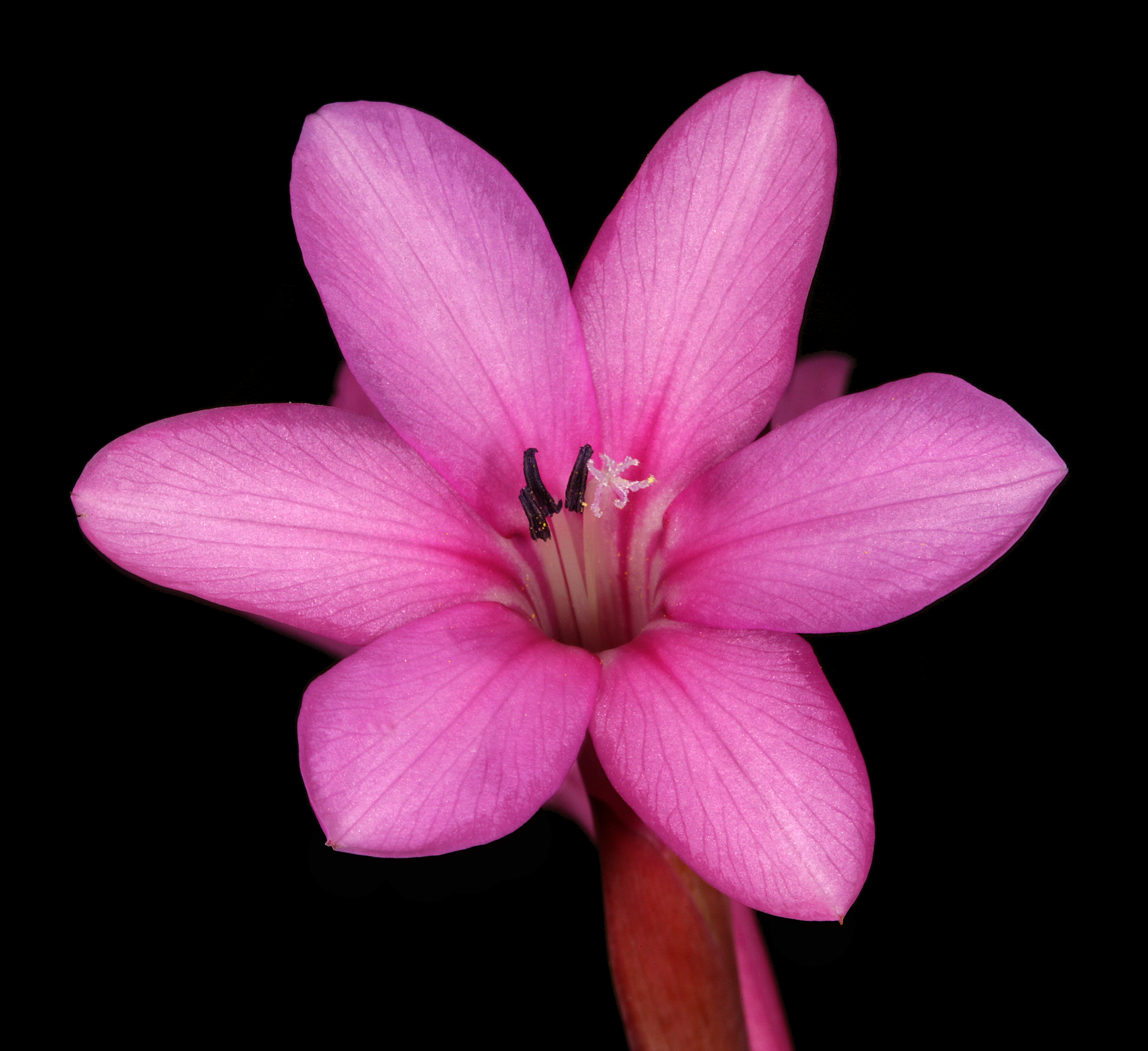

Scientific classification
- Kingdom: Plantae
- Clade: Tracheophytes
- Clade: Angiosperms
- Clade: Monocots
- Order: Asparagales
- Family: Iridaceae
- Genus: Watsonia
- Species: W. coccinea

Binomial name
- Watsonia coccinea Herb. ex Baker

Synonyms
- Watsonia meriana var. coccinea Herb. ex Baker; Watsonia merianella Eckl.

= Watsonia coccinea =

Species of flowering plant

Watsonia coccinea is a plant belonging to the genus Watsonia and is part of the fynbos. The species is endemic to the Western Cape.
