= Watsonia spectabilis =

Scientific classification
- Kingdom: Plantae
- Clade: Tracheophytes
- Clade: Angiosperms
- Clade: Monocots
- Order: Asparagales
- Family: Iridaceae
- Genus: Watsonia
- Species: W. spectabilis

Binomial name
- Watsonia spectabilis Schinz

Synonyms
- Watsonia pellucida Eckl.

Species of flowering plant

Watsonia spectabilis is a plant belonging to the genus Watsonia and is part of the fynbos. The species is endemic to the Northern Cape and the Western Cape.
