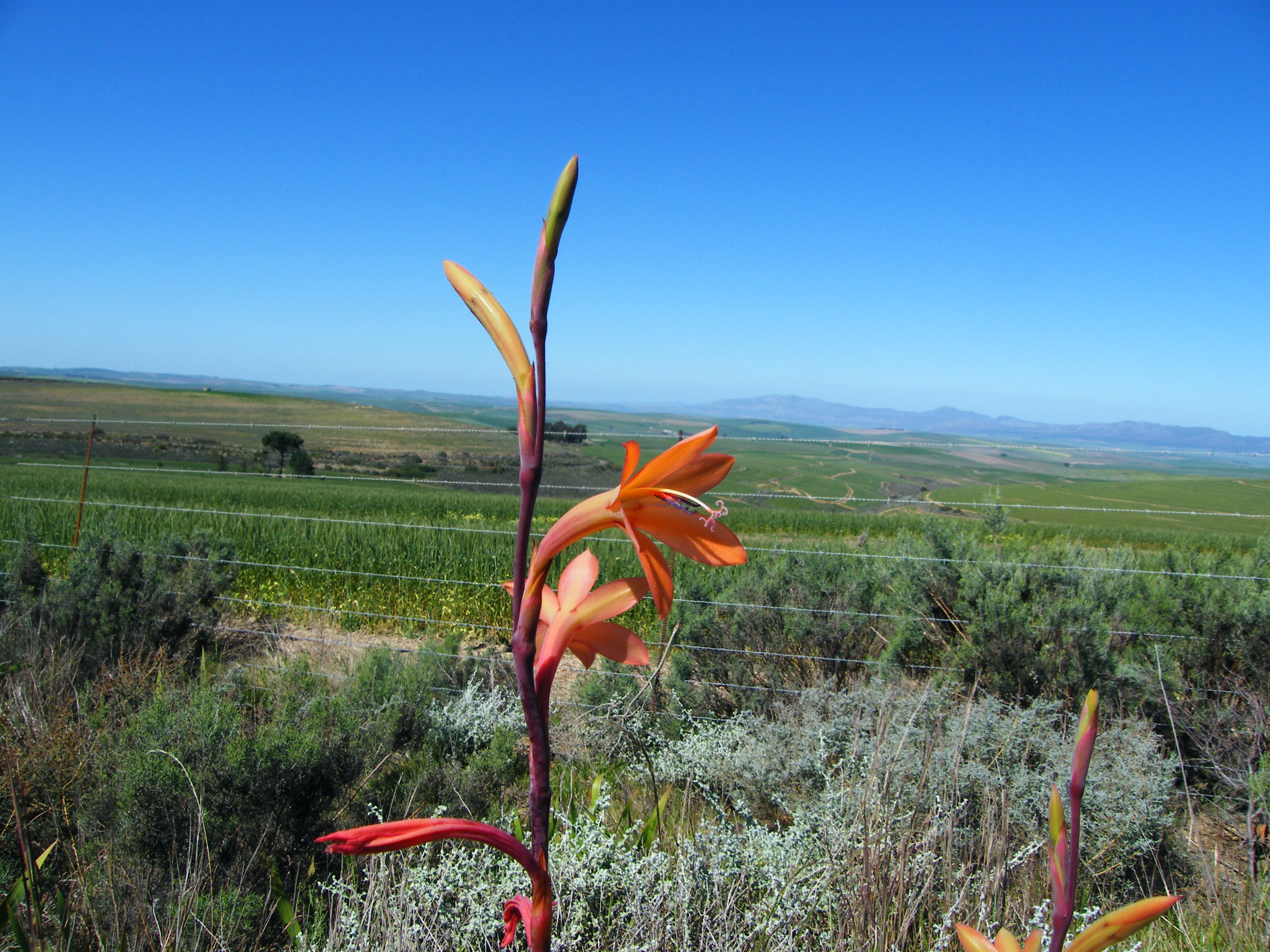

Scientific classification
- Kingdom: Plantae
- Clade: Tracheophytes
- Clade: Angiosperms
- Clade: Monocots
- Order: Asparagales
- Family: Iridaceae
- Genus: Watsonia
- Species: W. angusta

Binomial name
- Watsonia angusta Ker Gawl.

Synonyms
- Antholyza ludwigii Eckl.; Gladiolus jacquinii Schrank; Watsonia atrosanguinea Klatt

= Watsonia angusta =

Species of flowering plant

Watsonia angusta is a plant belonging to the genus Watsonia and forming part of the fynbos. The species is endemic to the Eastern Cape and Western Cape. It occurs from the Cederberg and Cape Peninsula, more coastally, to the foothills of the Drakensberg near the border of KwaZulu-Natal.
