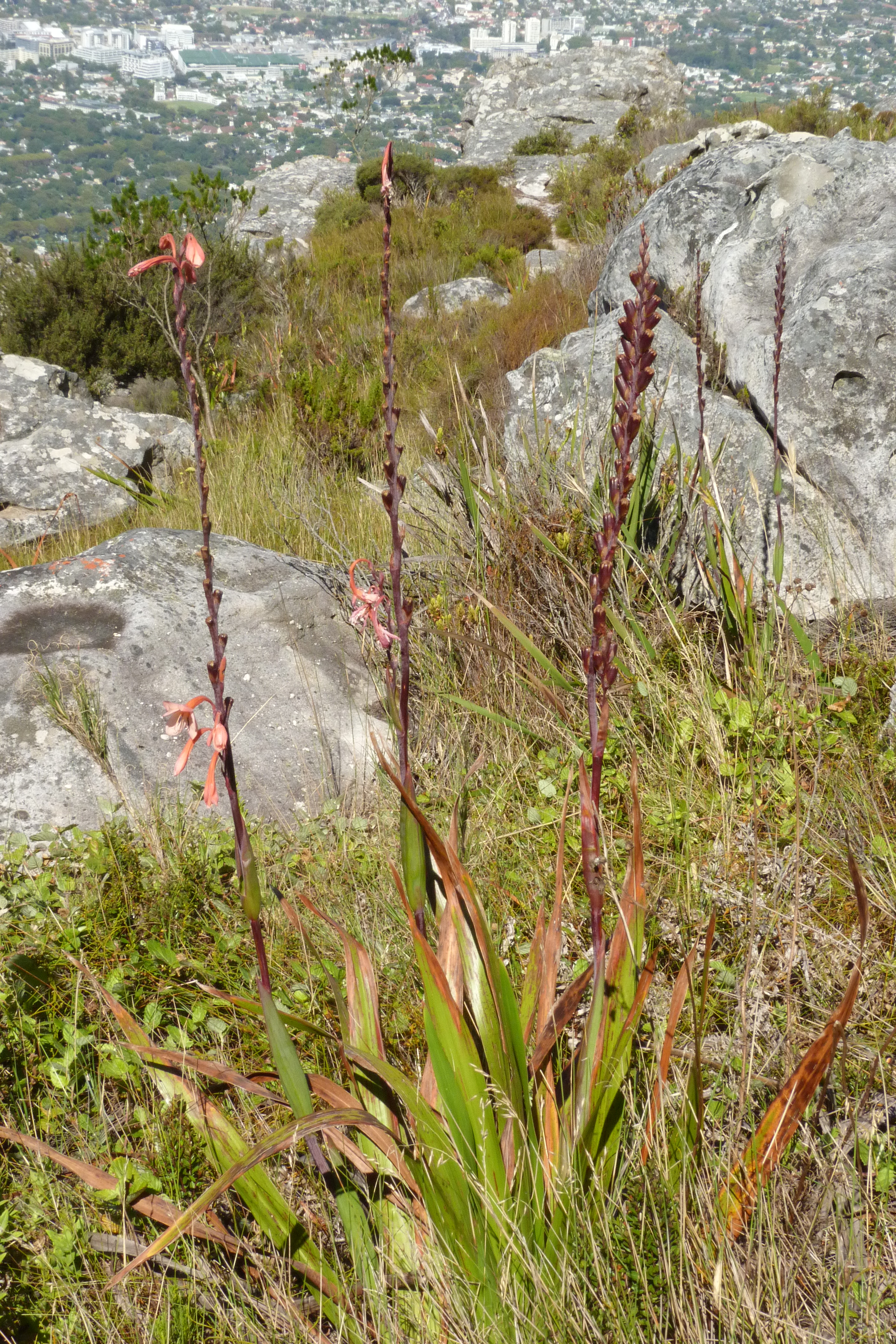

Scientific classification
- Kingdom: Plantae
- Clade: Tracheophytes
- Clade: Angiosperms
- Clade: Monocots
- Order: Asparagales
- Family: Iridaceae
- Genus: Watsonia
- Species: W. tabularis

Binomial name
- Watsonia tabularis J.W.Mathews & L.Bolus, (1922)

Synonyms
- Vieusseuxia tabularis Eckl.; Watsonia tabularis Eckl.; Watsonia tabularis var. concolor G.J.Lewis

= Watsonia tabularis =

Species of flowering plant

Watsonia tabularis, the Table Mountain watsonia is a plant that belongs to the genus Watsonia and forms part of the fynbos. The plant is endemic to the Western Cape.
