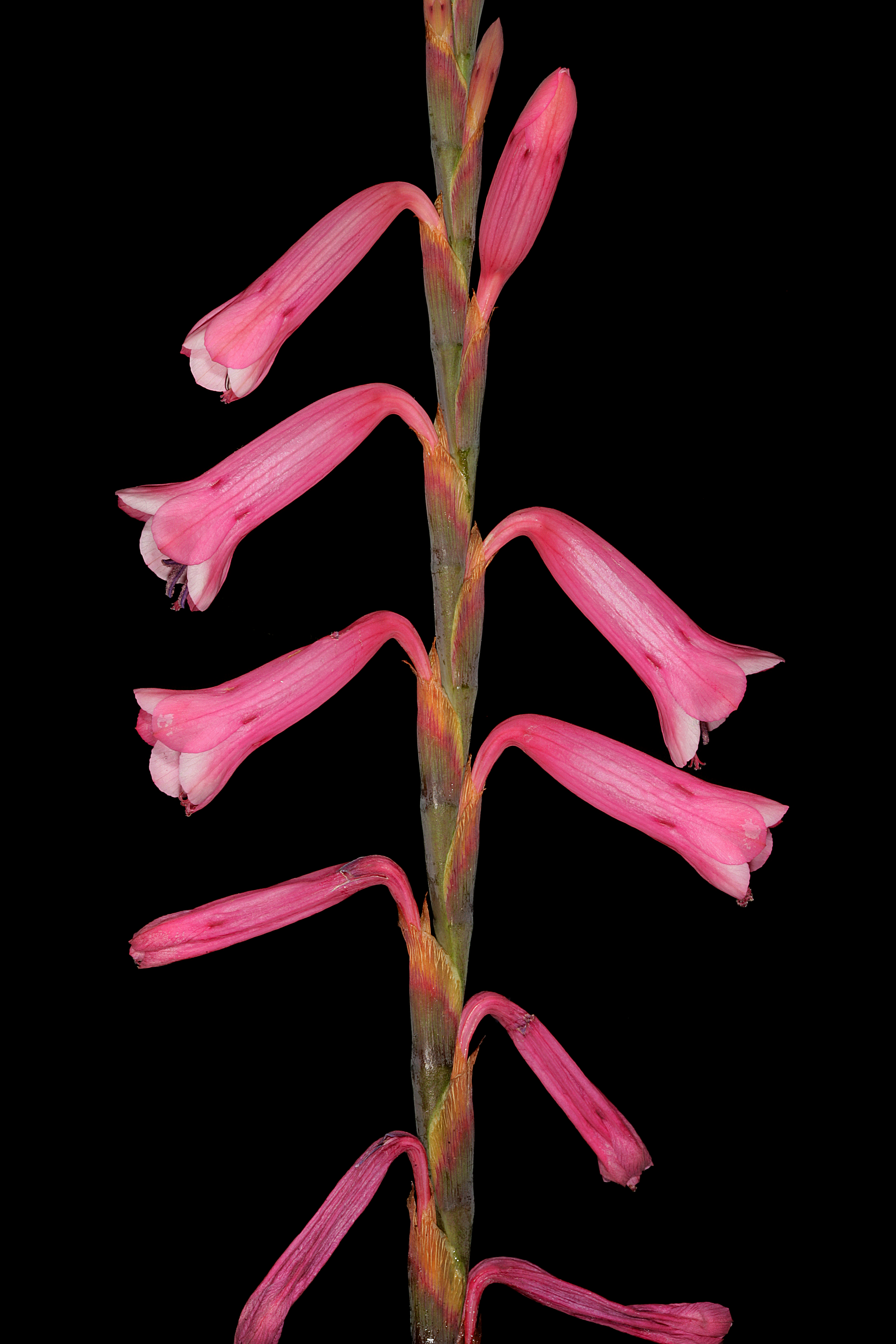

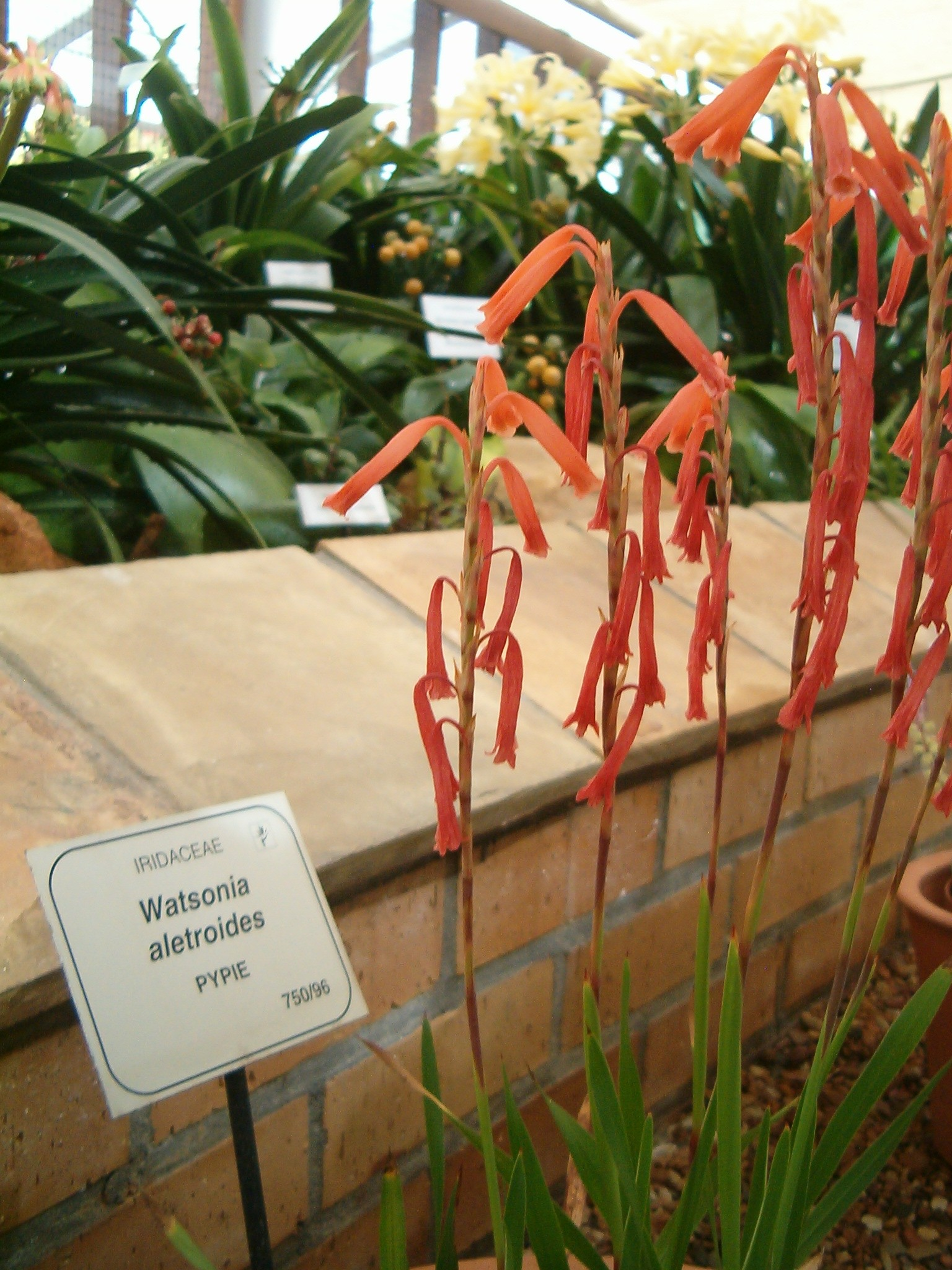

Scientific classification
- Kingdom: Plantae
- Clade: Tracheophytes
- Clade: Angiosperms
- Clade: Monocots
- Order: Asparagales
- Family: Iridaceae
- Genus: Watsonia
- Species: W. aletroides

Binomial name
- Watsonia aletroides (Burm.f.) Ker Gawl.

Synonyms
- Antholyza aletroides Burm.f.; Antholyza merianella Curtis; Antholyza tubulosa Andrews; Gladiolus aletroides (Burm.f.) Vahl; Gladiolus tubulosus Jacq.; Watsonia jacquinii Pers.; Watsonia tubulosa (Andrews) Pers.; Watsonia tubulosa Eckl.

= Watsonia aletroides =

Species of flowering plant

Watsonia aletroides is a plant belonging to the genus Watsonia and forming part of the fynbos. The species is endemic to the Western Cape where it occurs from the Bot River to Knysna and Uniondale. The plant has lost 50% of its habitat due to agricultural activities.
