= Watsonia knysnana =

Scientific classification
- Kingdom: Plantae
- Clade: Embryophytes
- Clade: Tracheophytes
- Clade: Spermatophytes
- Clade: Angiosperms
- Clade: Monocots
- Order: Asparagales
- Family: Iridaceae
- Genus: Watsonia
- Species: W. knysnana

Binomial name
- Watsonia knysnana L.Bolus

Synonyms
- Neuberia longifolia Eckl.

Species of flowering plant

Watsonia knysnana is a plant geophyte belonging to the genus Watsonia and is part of the fynbos. The species is endemic to the Eastern Cape and the Western Cape.
