= Watsonia dubia =

Scientific classification
- Kingdom: Plantae
- Clade: Tracheophytes
- Clade: Angiosperms
- Clade: Monocots
- Order: Asparagales
- Family: Iridaceae
- Genus: Watsonia
- Species: W. dubia

Binomial name
- Watsonia dubia Eckl. ex Klatt

Synonyms
- Watsonia meriana var. dubia (Eckl. ex Klatt) Baker

Species of flowering plant

Watsonia dubia is a geophyte belonging to the genus Watsonia and forms part of the fynbos. The species is endemic to the Western Cape and occurs from Citrusdal to Wellington. In the northern Swartland, 80% of the plant's habitat has been lost to agricultural activities. There are currently only three subpopulations known with less than 250 plants. Two of the subpopulations are located in nature reserves.
