= Watsonia zeyheri =

Scientific classification
- Kingdom: Plantae
- Clade: Tracheophytes
- Clade: Angiosperms
- Clade: Monocots
- Order: Asparagales
- Family: Iridaceae
- Genus: Watsonia
- Species: W. zeyheri

Binomial name
- Watsonia zeyheri L.Bolus

Synonyms
- Watsonia comptonii L.Bolus; Watsonia comptonii var. angustifolia L.Bolus; Watsonia elimensis L.Bolus; Watsonia strictiflora Eckl.

Species of flowering plant

Watsonia zeyheri is a plant belonging to the genus Watsonia and forming part of the fynbos. The species is endemic to the Western Cape.
