= Watsonia wilmsii =

Scientific classification
- Kingdom: Plantae
- Clade: Tracheophytes
- Clade: Angiosperms
- Clade: Monocots
- Order: Asparagales
- Family: Iridaceae
- Genus: Watsonia
- Species: W. wilmsii

Binomial name
- Watsonia wilmsii L.Bolus

Species of flowering plant

Watsonia wilmsii is a plant belonging to the genus Watsonia. The species is endemic to Mpumalanga and occurs on the Drakensberg escarpment east of Lydenburg. It has an area of 812 km^{2} and has lost habitat to plantations; the threat no longer exists because the remaining subpopulations are in protected areas. The plant is found on montane grassland, slopes at altitudes of 1 500 m.
