= Watsonia distans =

Scientific classification
- Kingdom: Plantae
- Clade: Tracheophytes
- Clade: Angiosperms
- Clade: Monocots
- Order: Asparagales
- Family: Iridaceae
- Genus: Watsonia
- Species: W. distans

Binomial name
- Watsonia distans L.Bolus

Synonyms
- Watsonia pauciflora L.Bolus

Species of flowering plant

Watsonia distans is a plant belonging to the genus Watsonia and is part of the fynbos. The species is endemic to the Western Cape and occurs from Franschhoek to Villiersdorp. There were nine known subpopulations, eight of which have been destroyed in the past 150 years by overexploitation, bush planting and dam construction. The only remaining population was discovered in 1997 on the summit of the Stettynsberge. This population has less than 250 plants.
