= Watsonia minima =

Scientific classification
- Kingdom: Plantae
- Clade: Tracheophytes
- Clade: Angiosperms
- Clade: Monocots
- Order: Asparagales
- Family: Iridaceae
- Genus: Watsonia
- Species: W. minima

Binomial name
- Watsonia minima Goldblatt

Species of flowering plant

Watsonia minima is a plant belonging to the genus Watsonia and is part of the fynbos. The species is endemic to the Western Cape and there is only one population in the Riviersonderend Mountains. The habitat is threatened by the pine tree, an invasive plant.
