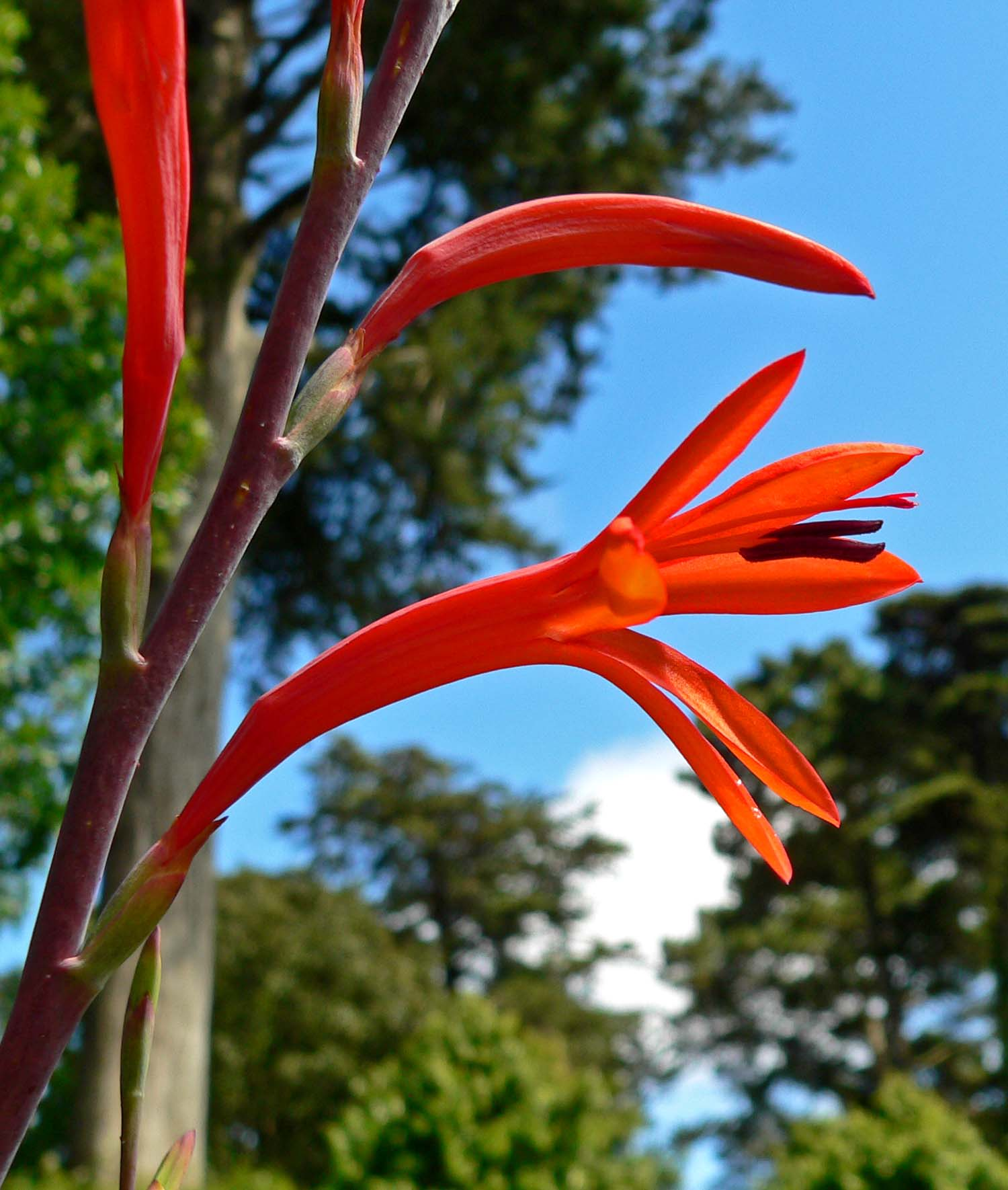
- Watsonia fulgens

Scientific classification
- Kingdom: Plantae
- Clade: Tracheophytes
- Clade: Angiosperms
- Clade: Monocots
- Order: Asparagales
- Family: Iridaceae
- Subfamily: Crocoideae
- Tribe: Watsonieae
- Genus: Watsonia; Mill.

Type species
- Watsonia meriana (L.) Mill.

Species
- 58 species (see text).

Synonyms
- Lemonia Pers.; Lomenia Pourr.; Meriana Trew; Warneria Mill. ex L.

= Watsonia (plant) =

Genus of flowering plants in the iris family

Watsonia (bugle lily) is a genus of plants in the family Iridaceae, subfamily Crocoideae. Watsonias are native to southern Africa (South Africa, Lesotho, Eswatini). The genus is named after Sir William Watson, an 18th-century British botanist.

== Diversity ==
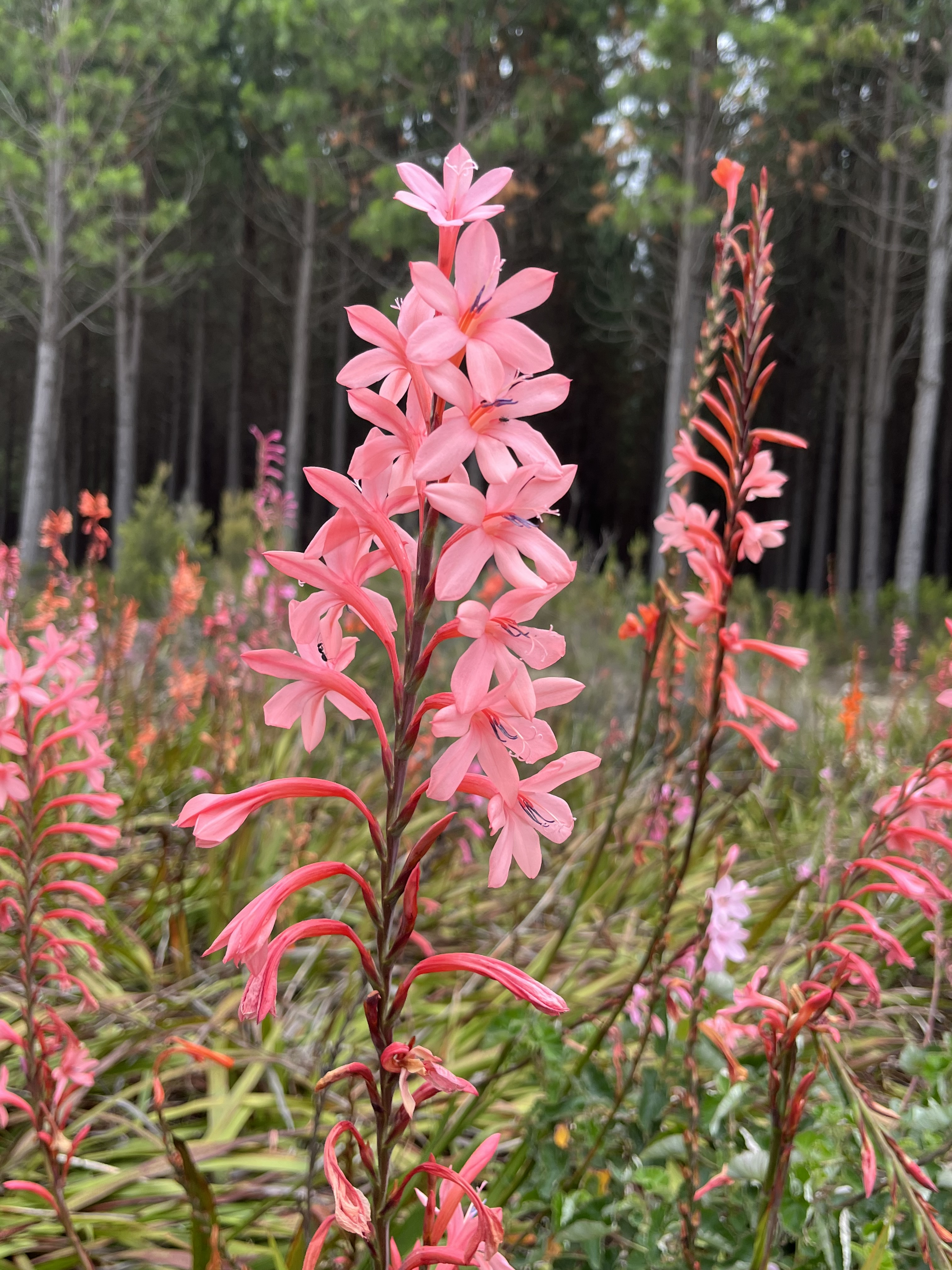
Watsonia field

There are 56 accepted species in southern Africa, with two varieties and about 112 names either unresolved or regarded as synonyms. All are perennial herbs growing from corms and producing erect spikes of showy flowers. Most are fynbos plants, adapted to a Mediterranean-type climate, but some occur along the eastern and inland areas of the country and adapted to a wider range of conditions, mainly continental climate with summer rainfall. Many species occur mainly in the mountains, though some occur in sandy flats and marshy areas.

== Cultivation ==
The most commonly cultivated species is the pink-flowered Watsonia borbonica and its white mutant 'Arderne's White'. These were crossed with Watsonia meriana and other species in the early 20th century by breeders including John Cronin in Australia and Luther Burbank in California to produce a wide range of cultivars. Watsonia has been eclipsed in popularity by Gladiolus and other bulbs, and is now neglected by the nursery industry.

== Distribution ==
Native to South Africa, Watsonia species were introduced as garden ornamentals to Australia in the mid-19th century and were widely grown by the 1940s.

In the South-West of Western Australia, six species have become naturalised from garden escapes along rivers, wetlands and seasonally wet ground. In places Watsonia spp. have displaced native understorey flora; concentrations of them create a fire hazard in summer.

Watsonia meriana var. bulbillifera is also a weed in New Zealand, Réunion and Mauritius.

== Systematics ==
The genus comprises 58 species.

- Watsonia aletroides (Burm.f.) Ker Gawl.
- Watsonia amabilis Goldblatt
- Watsonia amatolae Goldblatt
- Watsonia angusta Ker Gawl.
- Watsonia bachmannii L.Bolus
- Watsonia bella N.E.Br. ex Goldblatt
- Watsonia borbonica (Pourr.) Goldblatt
- Watsonia borbonica subsp. ardernei (Sander) Goldblatt
- Watsonia borbonica subsp. borbonica
- Watsonia canaliculata Goldblatt
- Watsonia coccinea (Herb. ex Baker) Baker
- Watsonia confusa Goldblatt
- Watsonia densiflora Baker
- Watsonia distans L.Bolus
- Watsonia dubia Eckl. ex Klatt
- Watsonia elsiae Goldblatt
- Watsonia emiliae L.Bolus
- Watsonia fergusoniae L.Bolus
- Watsonia fourcadei J.W.Mathews & L.Bolus
- Watsonia galpinii L.Bolus
- Watsonia gladioloides Schltr.
- Watsonia humilis Mill.
- Watsonia hysterantha J.W.Mathews & L.Bolus
- Watsonia inclinata Goldblatt
- Watsonia knysnana L.Bolus
- Watsonia laccata (Jacq.) Ker Gawl.
- Watsonia latifolia N.E.Br. ex Oberm.
- Watsonia lepida N.E.Br.
- Watsonia × longifolia J.W.Mathews & L.Bolus
- Watsonia marginata (L.f.) Ker Gawl.
- Watsonia marlothii L.Bolus
- Watsonia meriana (L.) Mill.
- Watsonia meriana var. bulbillifera (J.W.Mathews & L.Bolus) D.A.Cooke
- Watsonia meriana var. meriana
- Watsonia minima Goldblatt
- Watsonia mtamvunae Goldblatt
- Watsonia occulta L.Bolus
- Watsonia paucifolia Goldblatt
- Watsonia pillansii L.Bolus
- Watsonia pondoensis Goldblatt
- Watsonia pulchra N.E.Br. ex Goldblatt
- Watsonia rogersii L.Bolus
- Watsonia rourkei Goldblatt
- Watsonia schlechteri L.Bolus
- Watsonia spectabilis Schinz
- Watsonia stenosiphon L.Bolus
- Watsonia stokoei L.Bolus
- Watsonia strictiflora Ker Gawl.
- Watsonia strubeniae L.Bolus
- Watsonia tabularis J.W.Mathews & L.Bolus
- Watsonia transvaalensis Baker
- Watsonia vanderspuyae L.Bolus
- Watsonia versfeldii J.W.Mathews & L.Bolus
- Watsonia watsonioides (Baker) Oberm.
- Watsonia wilmaniae J.W.Mathews & L.Bolus
- Watsonia wilmsii L.Bolus
- Watsonia zeyheri L.Bolus

== See also ==
- List of plants known as lily
