= Watsonia confusa =

Scientific classification
- Kingdom: Plantae
- Clade: Tracheophytes
- Clade: Angiosperms
- Clade: Monocots
- Order: Asparagales
- Family: Iridaceae
- Genus: Watsonia
- Species: W. confusa

Binomial name
- Watsonia confusa Goldblatt

Species of flowering plant

Watsonia confusa is a geophyte belonging to the genus Watsonia. The species is endemic to KwaZulu-Natal and the Eastern Cape.
