= Watsonia pondoensis =

Scientific classification
- Kingdom: Plantae
- Clade: Tracheophytes
- Clade: Angiosperms
- Clade: Monocots
- Order: Asparagales
- Family: Iridaceae
- Genus: Watsonia
- Species: W. pondoensis

Binomial name
- Watsonia pondoensis Goldblatt

Species of flowering plant

Watsonia pondoensis is a plant belonging to the genus Watsonia. The species is endemic to KwaZulu-Natal and the Eastern Cape, where two subpopulations are known. One population is in the Umtamvuna Nature Reserve, the other is in a herbarium collection. The species is threatened by overgrazing, subsistence farming and the high incidence of fires.
