= Watsonia rourkei =

Scientific classification
- Kingdom: Plantae
- Clade: Tracheophytes
- Clade: Angiosperms
- Clade: Monocots
- Order: Asparagales
- Family: Iridaceae
- Genus: Watsonia
- Species: W. rourkei

Binomial name
- Watsonia rourkei Goldblatt

Species of flowering plant

Watsonia rourkei is a plant belonging to the genus Watsonia. The species is endemic to the Northern Cape where there is only one population in the Kamiesberge. Here it occurs on the northern slopes at altitudes of 1 600 m and is currently not threatened. The plant is considered extremely rare.
