= Watsonia canaliculata =

Scientific classification
- Kingdom: Plantae
- Clade: Tracheophytes
- Clade: Angiosperms
- Clade: Monocots
- Order: Asparagales
- Family: Iridaceae
- Genus: Watsonia
- Species: W. canaliculata

Binomial name
- Watsonia canaliculata Goldblatt

Species of flowering plant

Watsonia canaliculata is a plant belonging to the genus Watsonia. The species is endemic to KwaZulu-Natal and occurs in the Midlands. The plant has lost 70% of its habitat to plantations, agricultural activities and invasive species. The latter remains a major threat.
