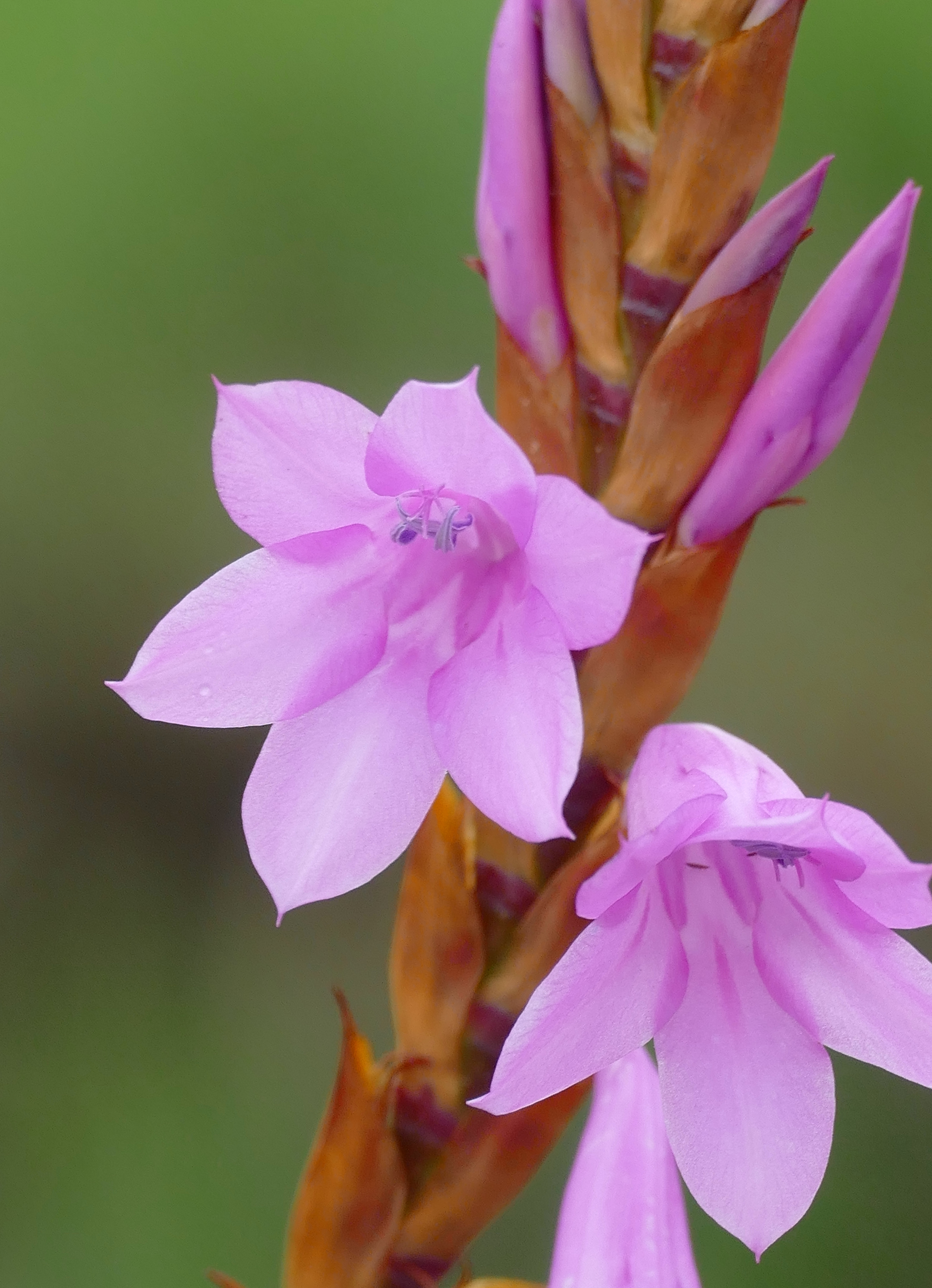

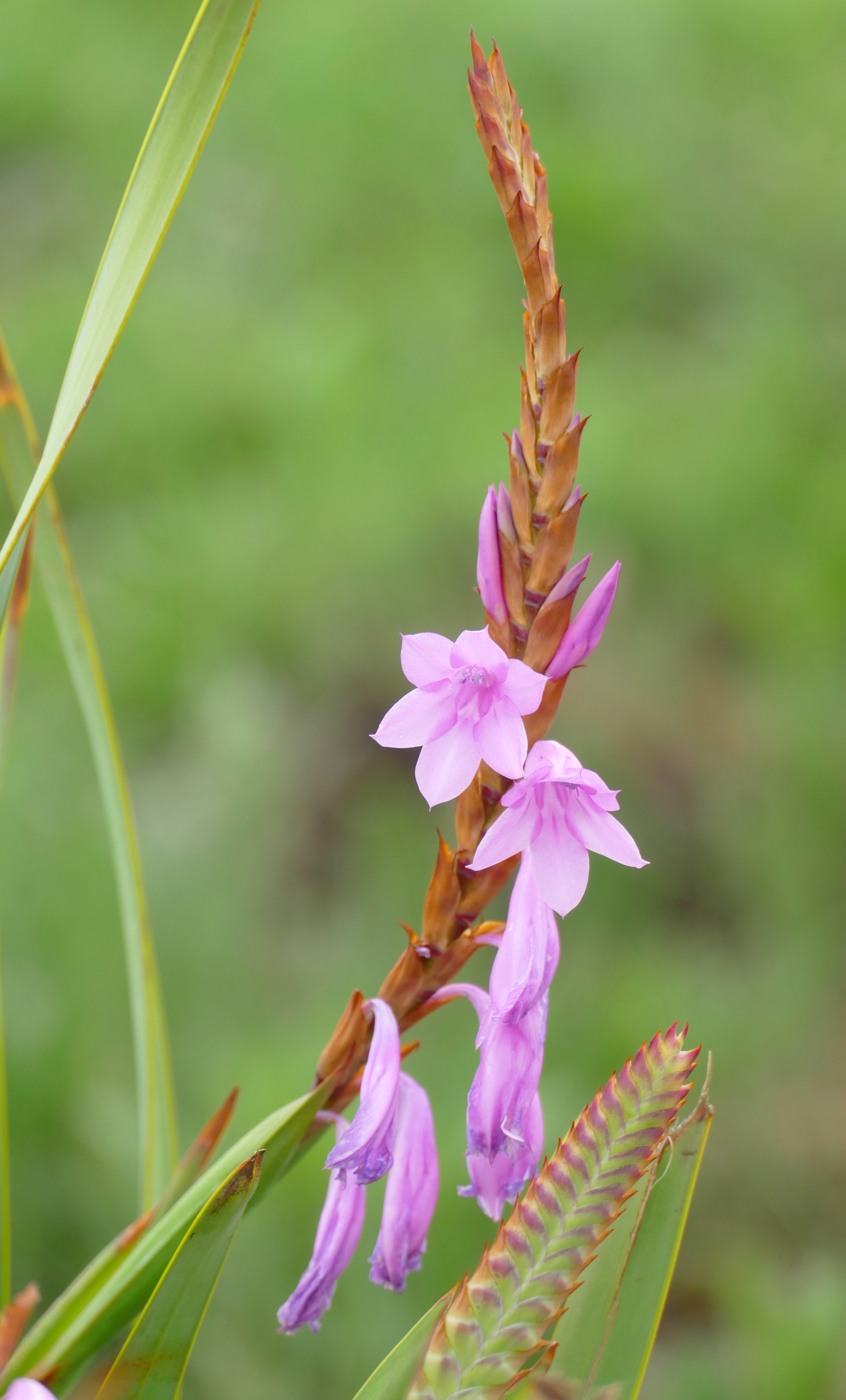

Scientific classification
- Kingdom: Plantae
- Clade: Tracheophytes
- Clade: Angiosperms
- Clade: Monocots
- Order: Asparagales
- Family: Iridaceae
- Genus: Watsonia
- Species: W. pulchra

Binomial name
- Watsonia pulchra N.E.Br. ex Goldblatt

= Watsonia pulchra =

Species of flowering plant

Watsonia pulchra is a plant belonging to the genus Watsonia. The species is native to KwaZulu-Natal, Mpumalanga, Free State and Eswatini.
