= Watsonia bella =

Scientific classification
- Kingdom: Plantae
- Clade: Tracheophytes
- Clade: Angiosperms
- Clade: Monocots
- Order: Asparagales
- Family: Iridaceae
- Genus: Watsonia
- Species: W. bella

Binomial name
- Watsonia bella N.E.Br. ex Goldblatt

Species of flowering plant

Watsonia bella is a plant belonging to the genus Watsonia. The species is native to Mpumalanga and Eswatini.
