= Watsonia vanderspuyae =

Scientific classification
- Kingdom: Plantae
- Clade: Tracheophytes
- Clade: Angiosperms
- Clade: Monocots
- Order: Asparagales
- Family: Iridaceae
- Genus: Watsonia
- Species: W. vanderspuyae

Binomial name
- Watsonia vanderspuyae L.Bolus

Species of flowering plant

Watsonia vanderspuyae is a plant belonging to the genus Watsonia and forming part of the fynbos. The species is endemic to the Northern Cape and Western Cape.
