= Watsonia schlechteri =

Scientific classification
- Kingdom: Plantae
- Clade: Tracheophytes
- Clade: Angiosperms
- Clade: Monocots
- Order: Asparagales
- Family: Iridaceae
- Genus: Watsonia
- Species: W. schlechteri

Binomial name
- Watsonia schlechteri L.Bolus

Synonyms
- Watsonia schinzii L.Bolus

Species of flowering plant

Watsonia schlechteri is a plant belonging to the genus Watsonia and is part of the fynbos. The species is endemic to the Western Cape.
