= Watsonia mtamvunae =

Scientific classification
- Kingdom: Plantae
- Clade: Tracheophytes
- Clade: Angiosperms
- Clade: Monocots
- Order: Asparagales
- Family: Iridaceae
- Genus: Watsonia
- Species: W. mtamvunae

Binomial name
- Watsonia mtamvunae Goldblatt

Species of flowering plant

Watsonia mtamvunae, the Umtamvuna watsonia, is a plant belonging to the genus Watsonia. The species is endemic to KwaZulu-Natal. Up to six subpopulations occur in the Umtamvuna Nature Reserve.

The plant has lost a large portion of its habitat to agricultural activities such as plantations. The planting of further plantations outside the reserve could affect the water table in the nature reserve, which would negatively affect the species. The plant is considered rare.
