= Watsonia strictiflora =

Scientific classification
- Kingdom: Plantae
- Clade: Tracheophytes
- Clade: Angiosperms
- Clade: Monocots
- Order: Asparagales
- Family: Iridaceae
- Genus: Watsonia
- Species: W. strictiflora

Binomial name
- Watsonia strictiflora Ker Gawl.

Synonyms
- Gladiolus sprengelianus Schult.; Gladiolus strictiflorus (Ker Gawl.) Redouté

Species of flowering plant

Watsonia strictiflora, the Klipheuwel watsonia, is a plant belonging to the genus Watsonia and forming part of the fynbos. The species is endemic to the Western Cape and occurs from Klapmuts to Joostenberg and Paarl. The plant has lost 98% of its habitat over the past 200 years to the establishment of vineyards and the planting of grain as well as urban development. It is also threatened by invasive plants.
