= Watsonia bachmannii =

Scientific classification
- Kingdom: Plantae
- Clade: Tracheophytes
- Clade: Angiosperms
- Clade: Monocots
- Order: Asparagales
- Family: Iridaceae
- Genus: Watsonia
- Species: W. bachmannii

Binomial name
- Watsonia bachmannii L.Bolus

Species of flowering plant

Watsonia bachmannii is a plant belonging to the genus Watsonia and is endemic to the Eastern Cape and southwestern KwaZulu-Natal, on the border of the two provinces.
