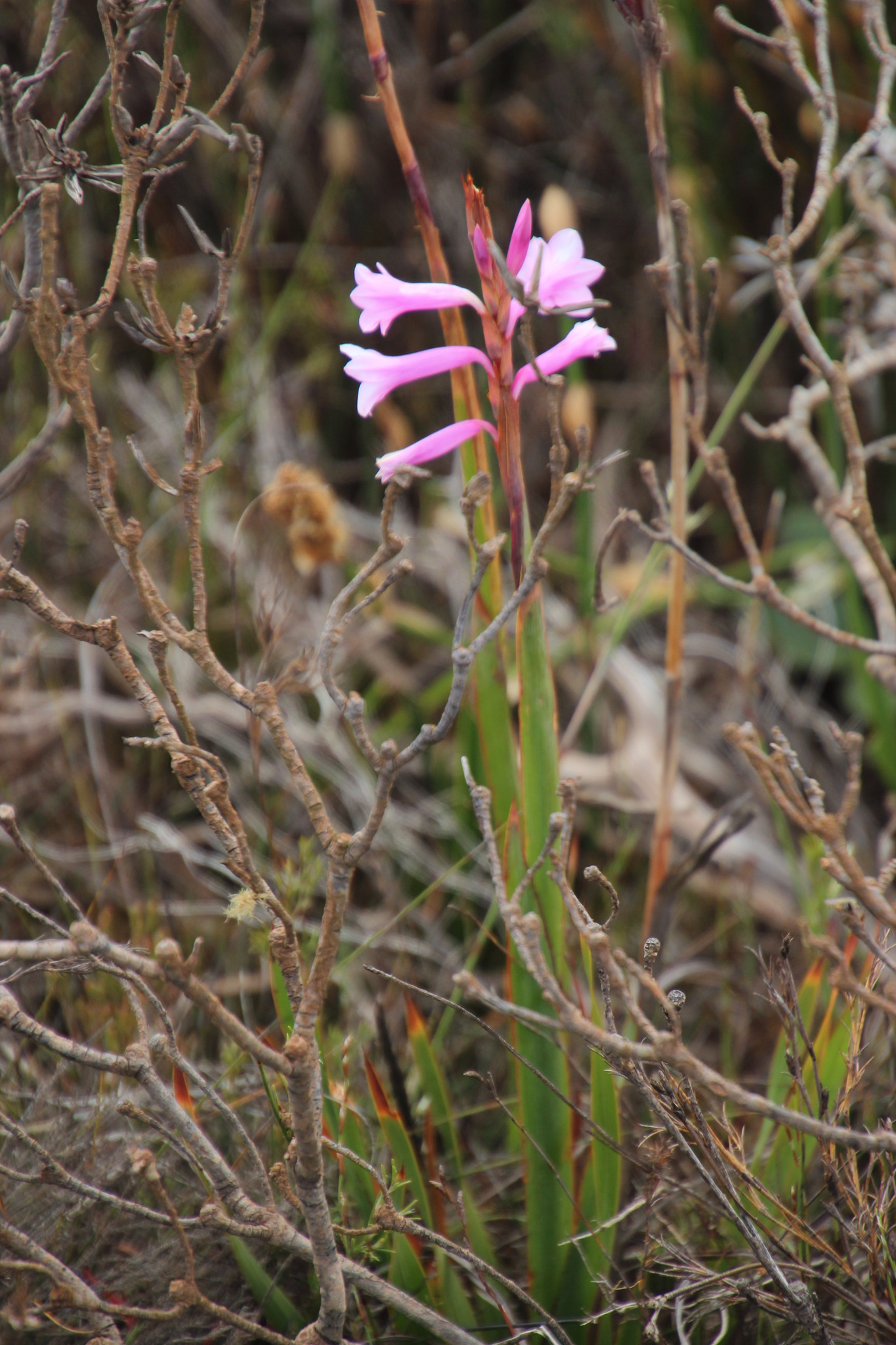

Scientific classification
- Kingdom: Plantae
- Clade: Tracheophytes
- Clade: Angiosperms
- Clade: Monocots
- Order: Asparagales
- Family: Iridaceae
- Genus: Watsonia
- Species: W. laccata

Binomial name
- Watsonia laccata (Jacq.) Ker Gawl.

Synonyms
- Antholyza spicata Andrews; Gladiolus laccatus Jacq.; Gladiolus testaceus Vahl; Watsonia albertiniensis R.Glover; Watsonia brevifolia Ker Gawl.; Watsonia caledonica Baker; Watsonia hyacinthoides Pers.; Watsonia muirii E.Phillips; Watsonia spicata Klatt

= Watsonia laccata =

Species of flowering plant

Watsonia laccata is a plant belonging to the genus Watsonia and is part of the fynbos. The species is endemic to the Eastern Cape and the Western Cape.
