= Watsonia watsonioides =

Scientific classification
- Kingdom: Plantae
- Clade: Tracheophytes
- Clade: Angiosperms
- Clade: Monocots
- Order: Asparagales
- Family: Iridaceae
- Genus: Watsonia
- Species: W. watsonioides

Binomial name
- Watsonia watsonioides (Baker) Oberm.

Synonyms
- Tritonia watsonioides Baker; Watsonia flavida Bolus

Species of flowering plant

Watsonia watsonioides is a plant belonging to the genus Watsonia. The species is native to Mpumalanga and Eswatini.
