= Watsonia paucifolia =

Scientific classification
- Kingdom: Plantae
- Clade: Tracheophytes
- Clade: Angiosperms
- Clade: Monocots
- Order: Asparagales
- Family: Iridaceae
- Genus: Watsonia
- Species: W. paucifolia

Binomial name
- Watsonia paucifolia Goldblatt

Species of flowering plant

Watsonia paucifolia is a plant belonging to the genus Watsonia and is part of the fynbos. The species is endemic to the Western Cape.
