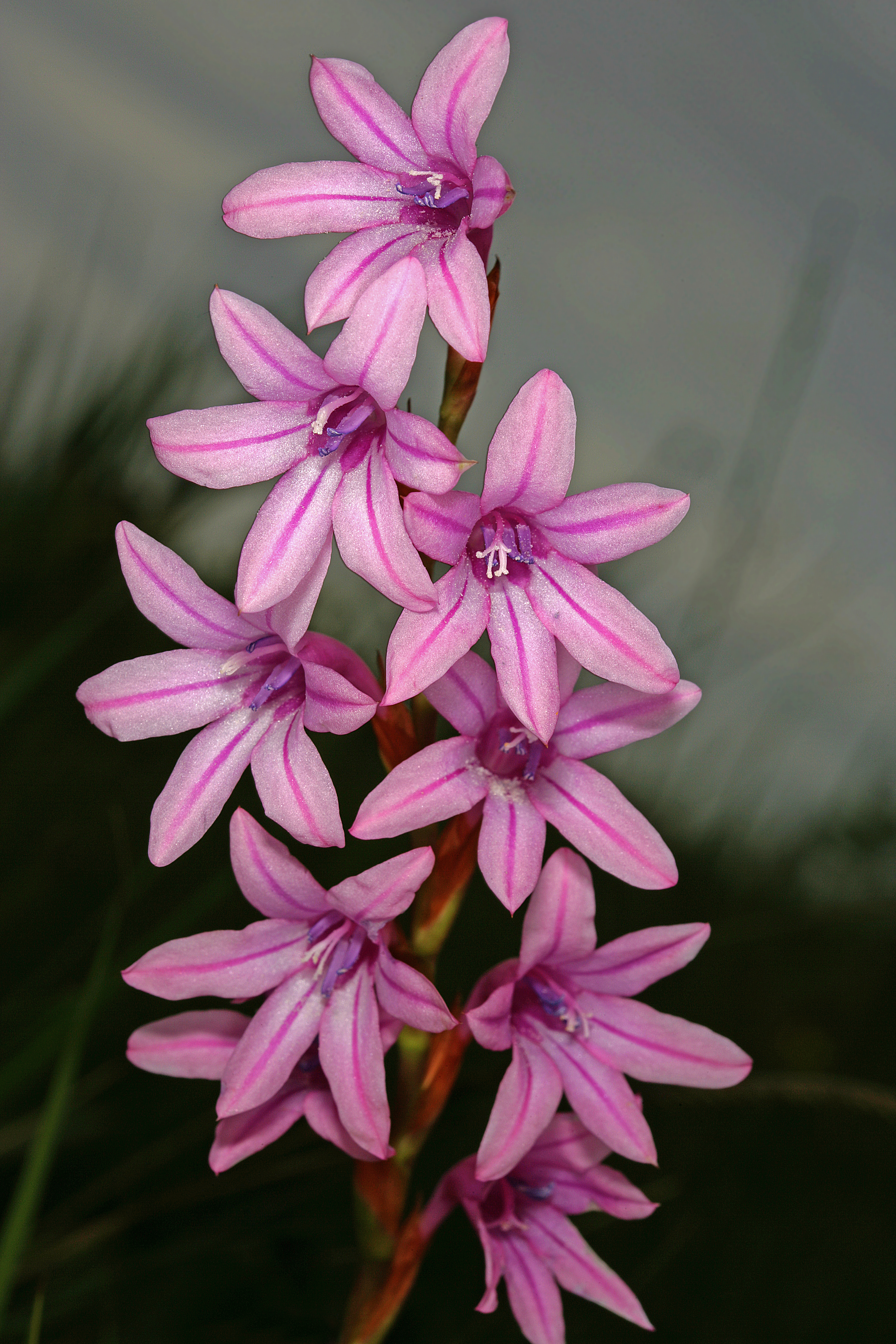

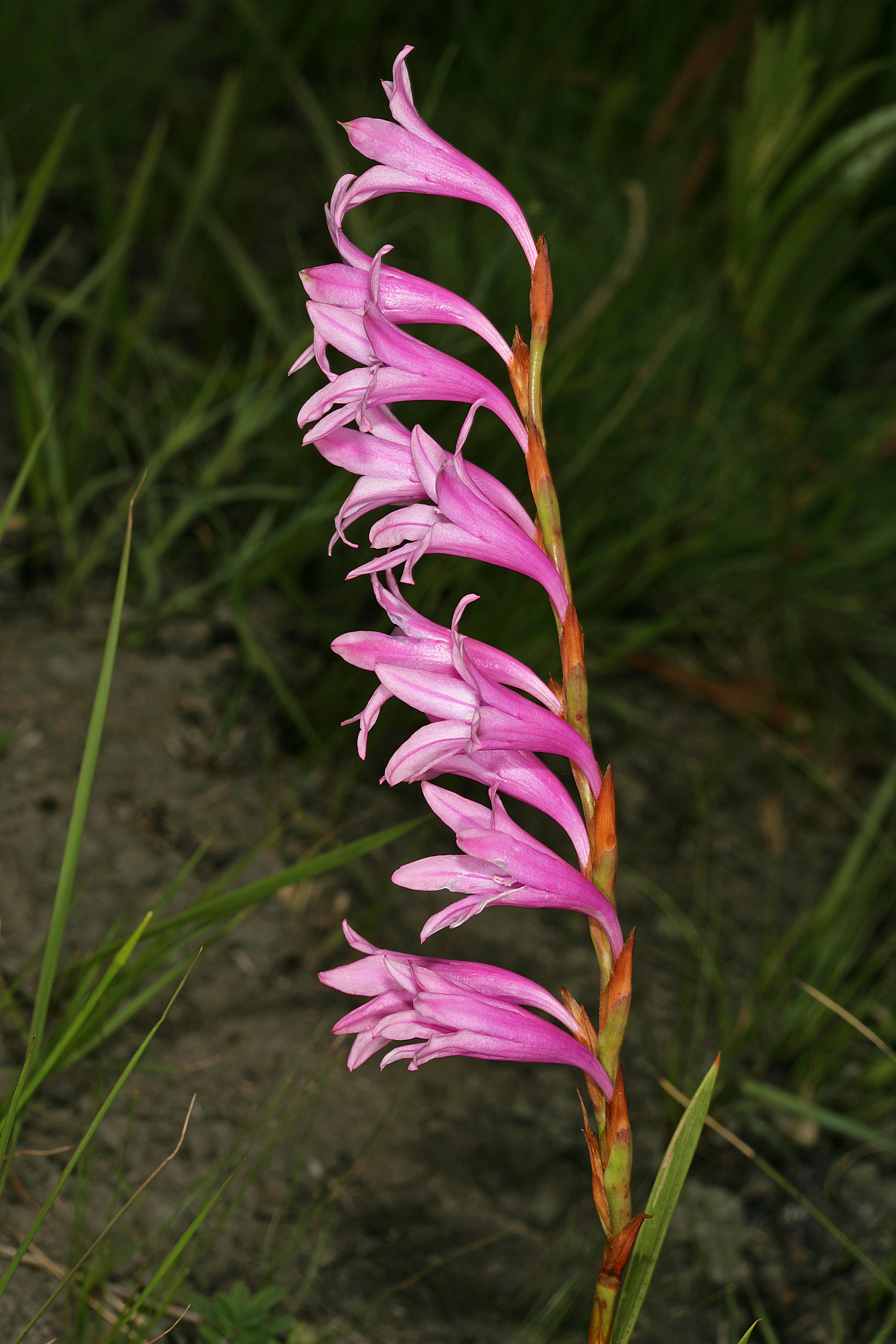

Scientific classification
- Kingdom: Plantae
- Clade: Tracheophytes
- Clade: Angiosperms
- Clade: Monocots
- Order: Asparagales
- Family: Iridaceae
- Genus: Watsonia
- Species: W. inclinata

Binomial name
- Watsonia inclinata Goldblatt

= Watsonia inclinata =

Species of flowering plant

Watsonia inclinata is a plant belonging to the genus Watsonia. The species is endemic to KwaZulu-Natal and the Eastern Cape and occurs from the Mtamvuna River to the Mkweni River. There are fewer than five subpopulations and the habitat is threatened by overgrazing and agricultural activities.
