= Watsonia elsiae =

Scientific classification
- Kingdom: Plantae
- Clade: Tracheophytes
- Clade: Angiosperms
- Clade: Monocots
- Order: Asparagales
- Family: Iridaceae
- Genus: Watsonia
- Species: W. elsiae

Binomial name
- Watsonia elsiae Goldblatt

Species of flowering plant

Watsonia elsiae is a geophyte belonging to the genus Watsonia and is part of the fynbos. The species is endemic to the Eastern Cape and the Western Cape and occurs from Uniondale to Joubertina. There are three subpopulations that are threatened by invasive plants.
