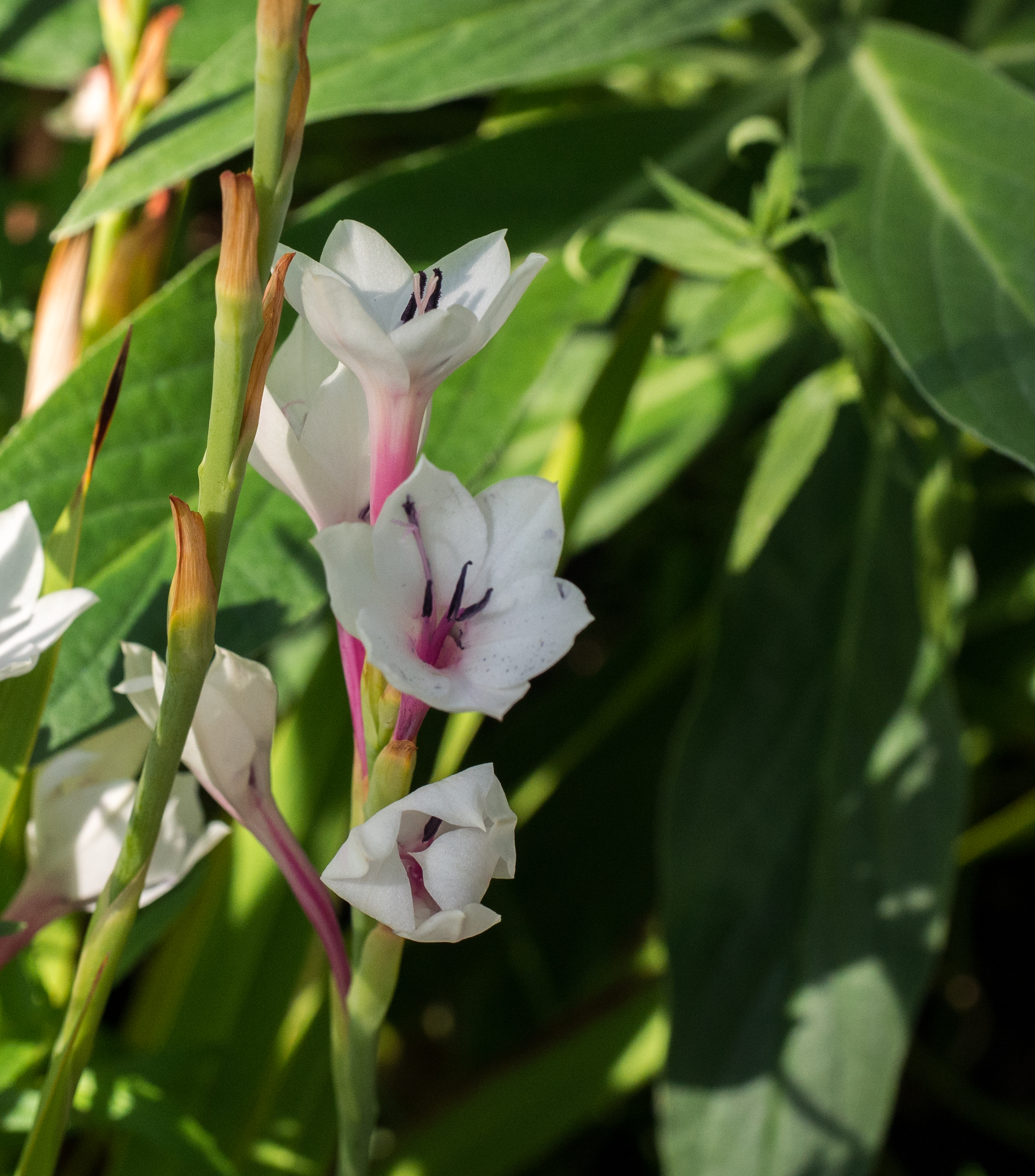

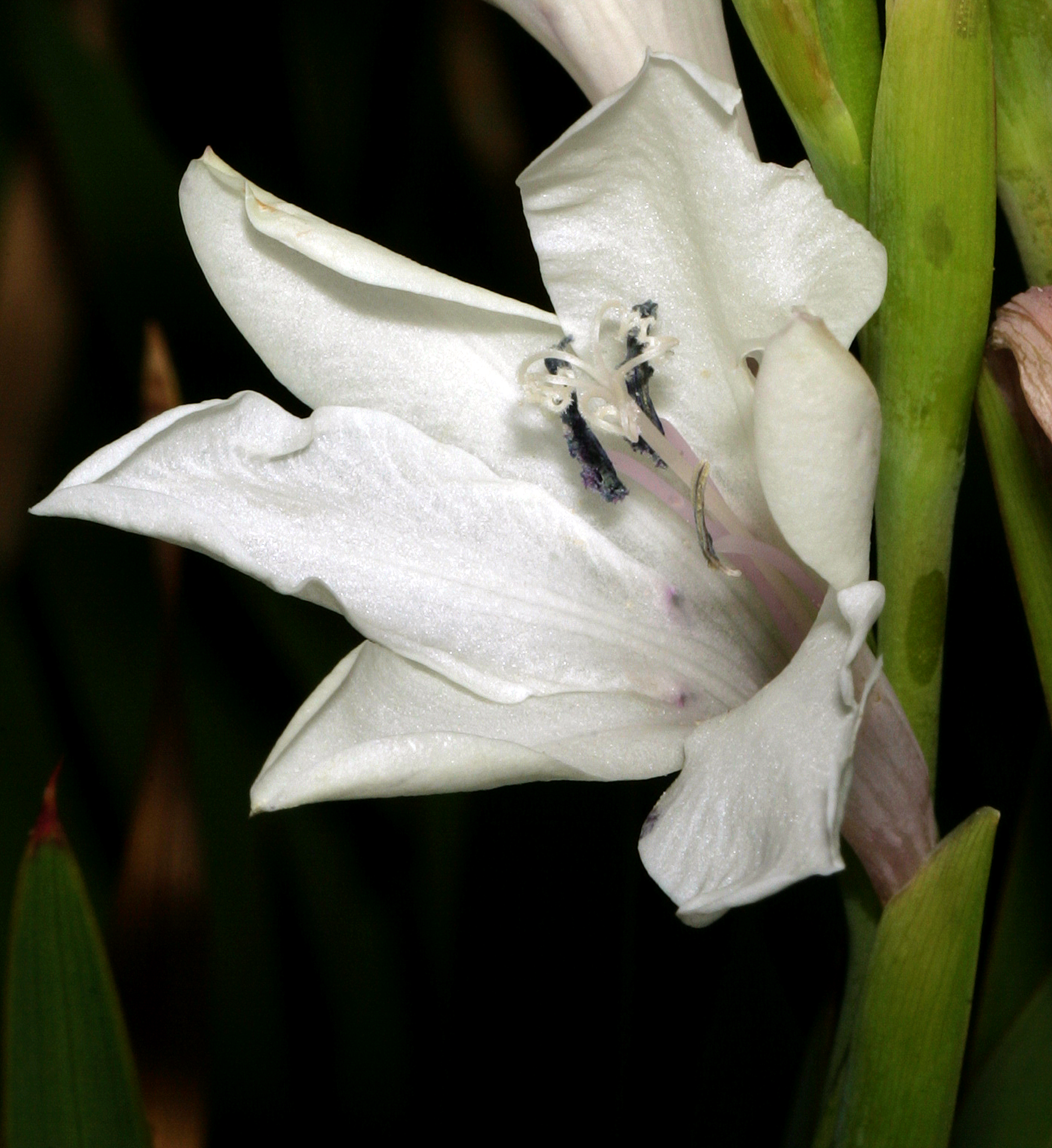

Scientific classification
- Kingdom: Plantae
- Clade: Tracheophytes
- Clade: Angiosperms
- Clade: Monocots
- Order: Asparagales
- Family: Iridaceae
- Genus: Watsonia
- Species: W. humilis

Binomial name
- Watsonia humilis Mill.

Synonyms
- Antholyza caryophyllaea Vahl; Antholyza caryophyllea Panz.; Gladiolus merianellus Thunb.; Gladiolus roseoalbus Jacq.; Lapeirousia marmorata (Lam.) Steud. i; Neuberia humilis Eckl.; Peyrousia marmorata (Lam.) Poir.; Watsonia erubescens Banks ex Ker-Gawl.; Watsonia litura Klatt; Watsonia maculata Klatt; Watsonia meriana var. roseoalba (Jacq.) Baker; Watsonia roseoalba (Jacq.) Ker Gawl.

= Watsonia humilis =

Species of flowering plant

Watsonia humilis is a plant belonging to the genus Watsonia and is part of the fynbos. The species is endemic to the Western Cape. The plant has lost 90% of its historical habitat to suburban development and agricultural activities. The threat continues and invasive species have also become a threat. There are currently only two known subpopulations, one at Gordon's Bay - less than 50 plants - and a second in the Breede River Valley near Wolseley. The latter was only discovered in 2012.
