= Watsonia wilmaniae =

Scientific classification
- Kingdom: Plantae
- Clade: Tracheophytes
- Clade: Angiosperms
- Clade: Monocots
- Order: Asparagales
- Family: Iridaceae
- Genus: Watsonia
- Species: W. wilmaniae

Binomial name
- Watsonia wilmaniae J.W.Mathews & L.Bolus

Synonyms
- Watsonia desmidtii L.Bolus; Watsonia starkeae L.Bolus

Species of flowering plant

Watsonia wilmaniae is a plant belonging to the genus Watsonia and forming part of the fynbos. The species is endemic to the Western Cape.
