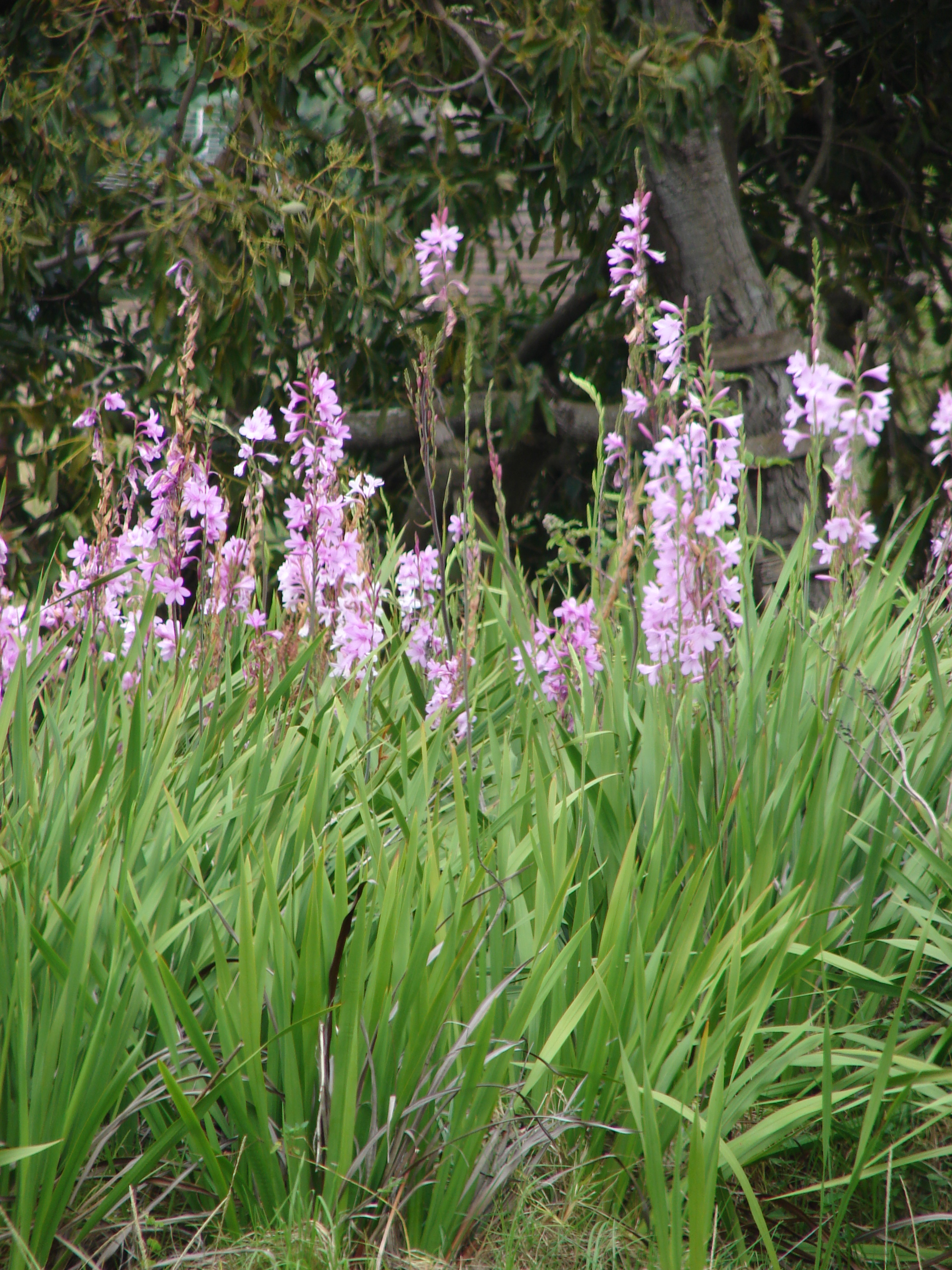

Scientific classification
- Kingdom: Plantae
- Clade: Tracheophytes
- Clade: Angiosperms
- Clade: Monocots
- Order: Asparagales
- Family: Iridaceae
- Genus: Watsonia
- Species: W. borbonica

Binomial name
- Watsonia borbonica (Pourr.) Goldblatt

= Watsonia borbonica =

Species of flowering plant

Watsonia borbonica, the Cape bugle-lily, is a species of plant in the family Iridaceae that is native to South Africa.

== Taxonomy ==
Watsonia borbonica has two subspecies: W. borbonica subsp. ardernei, and subsp. borbonica. W. borbonica subsp. ardernei is named in honour of H.M. Arderne, the Cape Town businessman whose family established the Arderne Gardens in Claremont . This subspecies is best known for its white form that is well-established in cultivation.

== Characteristics ==
The species grows from corms. It is dormant in summer and grows in winter, which is the rainy season in its native habitat. It has tall strap-like leaves growing in a fan arrangement. It may grow up to two metres tall. It flowers for up to 4–5 weeks in spring.

== Distribution and habitat ==
Watsonia borbonica grows in the winter-rainfall areas of the Western Cape of South Africa. It usually grows on slopes consisting of rocky sandstone or clay and granite. It may be found occasionally in sandy soils.

== Cultivation ==
Watsonia borbonica is a good garden plant as it bears showy flowers. It needs well-drained soil and full sun. During the dormant phase it should be kept dry.
