= Watsonia latifolia =

Scientific classification
- Kingdom: Plantae
- Clade: Tracheophytes
- Clade: Angiosperms
- Clade: Monocots
- Order: Asparagales
- Family: Iridaceae
- Genus: Watsonia
- Species: W. latifolia

Binomial name
- Watsonia latifolia N.E.Br. ex Oberm.

Species of flowering plant

Watsonia latifolia is a plant belonging to the genus Watsonia. The species is native to KwaZulu-Natal, Mpumalanga and Eswatini.
