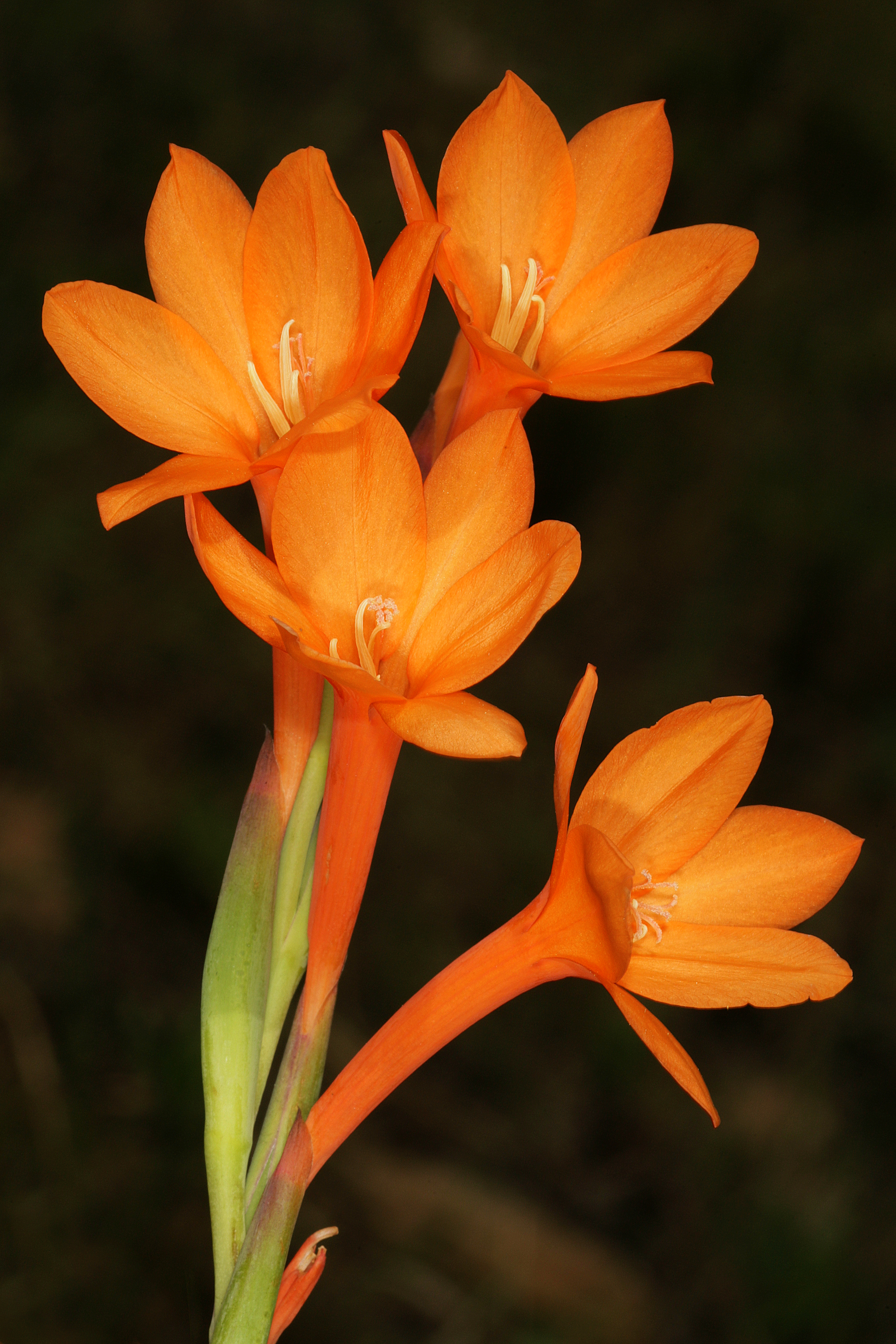

Scientific classification
- Kingdom: Plantae
- Clade: Tracheophytes
- Clade: Angiosperms
- Clade: Monocots
- Order: Asparagales
- Family: Iridaceae
- Genus: Watsonia
- Species: W. pillansii

Binomial name
- Watsonia pillansii L.Bolus (1921)

Synonyms
- Watsonia archbelliae L.Bolus; Watsonia beatricis J.W.Mathews & L.Bolus; Watsonia hutchinsonii L.Bolus; Watsonia masoniae L.Bolus; Watsonia priorii L.Bolus; Watsonia socium J.W.Mathews & L.Bolus; Watsonia westiae L.Bolus

= Watsonia pillansii =

Species of flowering plant

Watsonia pillansii, the Pillans’ watsonia, is a plant belonging to the genus Watsonia. The species is endemic to KwaZulu-Natal, the Eastern Cape and the Western Cape.
