= Watsonia emiliae =

Scientific classification
- Kingdom: Plantae
- Clade: Tracheophytes
- Clade: Angiosperms
- Clade: Monocots
- Order: Asparagales
- Family: Iridaceae
- Genus: Watsonia
- Species: W. emiliae

Binomial name
- Watsonia emiliae L.Bolus

Species of flowering plant

Watsonia emiliae is a plant belonging to the genus Watsonia and is part of the fynbos. The species is endemic to the Western Cape and occurs in the Swartberg and Langeberg. Little is known about the species, it re-flowers after a fire. Two subpopulations are known and both are in protected areas.
