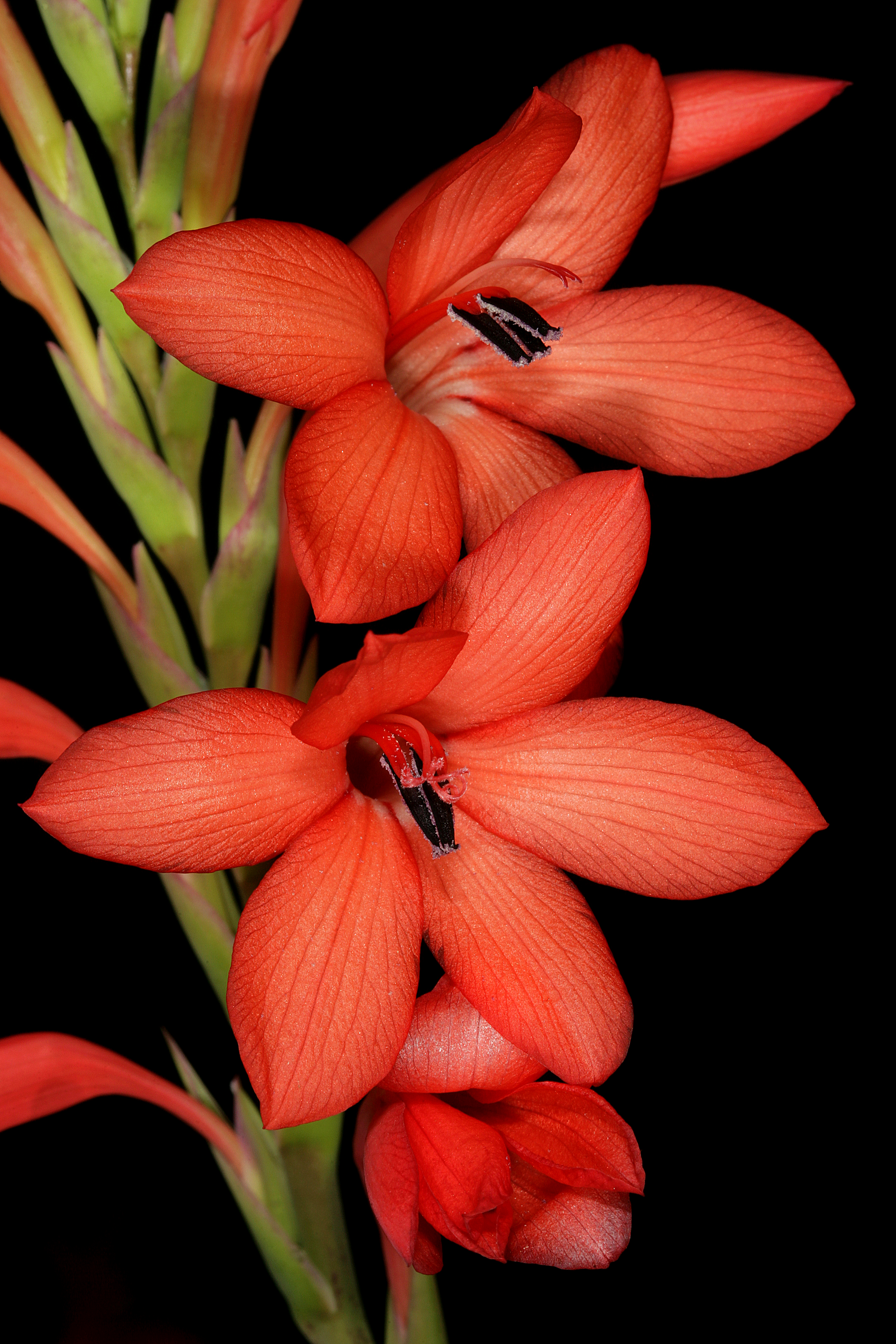

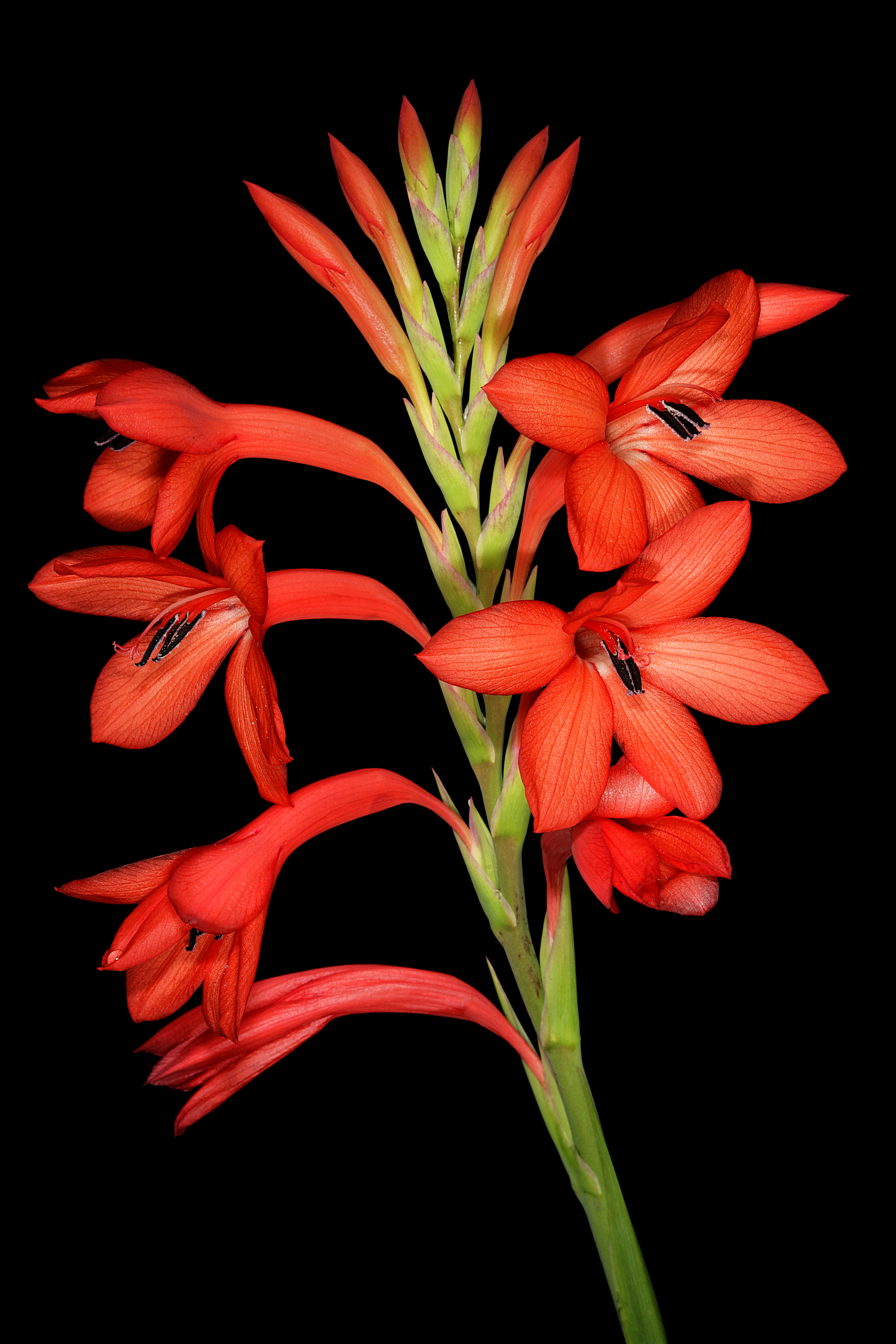

Scientific classification
- Kingdom: Plantae
- Clade: Tracheophytes
- Clade: Angiosperms
- Clade: Monocots
- Order: Asparagales
- Family: Iridaceae
- Genus: Watsonia
- Species: W. hysterantha

Binomial name
- Watsonia hysterantha J.W.Mathews & L.Bolus

= Watsonia hysterantha =

Species of flowering plant

Watsonia hysterantha the Saldanha watsonia and autumn watsonia, is a plant belonging to the genus Watsonia and is part of the fynbos. The species is endemic to the Western Cape and occurs from Saldanha to Langebaan. The plant is threatened by urban and industrial development.
