= Watsonia transvaalensis =

Scientific classification
- Kingdom: Plantae
- Clade: Tracheophytes
- Clade: Angiosperms
- Clade: Monocots
- Order: Asparagales
- Family: Iridaceae
- Genus: Watsonia
- Species: W. transvaalensis

Binomial name
- Watsonia transvaalensis Baker

Species of flowering plant

Watsonia transvaalensis is a plant belonging to the genus Watsonia. The species is endemic to Limpopo.
