= John Cronin (horticulturist) =

John Cronin (born 1865) was an Australian botanist and horticulturist active in Victoria. He directed the Royal Botanic Gardens in Melbourne until his death.

== Career ==
Born in 1865 in Clunes, Cronin began working as a miner in the area, before relocating to Melbourne in 1886 where he found a job at the Royal Botanic Gardens. His mentor at the Botanic Gardens was W. R. Guilfoyle. After ten years with Guilfoyle, Cronin was hired by the Department of Agriculture as an orchid inspector. In 1908, he took over Charles Luffman as Principal of the Burnley Horticultural College, Richmond in 1908. During his two-year term, Cronin focused on pruning and hybridisation. One of his students here was Olive Mellor, who became a prominent landscape architect and gardening writer. Cronin resigned as Principal in mid-1909 to become Director of the Royal Botanic Gardens, succeeding Guilfoyle. Unlike his predecessor, Cronin was strictly a horticulturist and did not concerned himself with other matters like landscape design. During this period he built strong links with the gardening public, and carried out experimental breeding of ornamental flowers including tree dahlias and Watsonia plants. Many of the flowers that Cronin bred, which bloomed in spring and were named after places in Australia, were released in the 1920s, most of which remain extant, albeit nameless. He was also President of the Victorian Horticultural Society.

== Later years and death ==
Cronin remained as Director of the Royal Botanic Gardens until his death. After a brief illness in early 1922, Cronin relapsed and died in July 1923. He was survived by his wife and their three daughters and two sons.
