= Watsonia strubeniae =

Scientific classification
- Kingdom: Plantae
- Clade: Tracheophytes
- Clade: Angiosperms
- Clade: Monocots
- Order: Asparagales
- Family: Iridaceae
- Genus: Watsonia
- Species: W. strubeniae

Binomial name
- Watsonia strubeniae L.Bolus

Synonyms
- Watsonia alpina G.J.Lewis; Watsonia transvaalensis var. drakensbergensis L.Bolus

Species of flowering plant

Watsonia strubeniae is a plant belonging to the genus Watsonia. The species is endemic to Limpopo and Mpumalanga.
