= Watsonia gladioloides =

Scientific classification
- Kingdom: Plantae
- Clade: Tracheophytes
- Clade: Angiosperms
- Clade: Monocots
- Order: Asparagales
- Family: Iridaceae
- Genus: Watsonia
- Species: W. gladioloides

Binomial name
- Watsonia gladioloides Schltr.

Synonyms
- Watsonia baurii L.Bolus

Species of flowering plant

Watsonia gladioloides is a plant belonging to the genus Watsonia. The species is native to Eswatini, KwaZulu-Natal, Lesotho and the Eastern Cape.
