= Watsonia versfeldii =

Scientific classification
- Kingdom: Plantae
- Clade: Tracheophytes
- Clade: Angiosperms
- Clade: Monocots
- Order: Asparagales
- Family: Iridaceae
- Genus: Watsonia
- Species: W. versfeldii

Binomial name
- Watsonia versfeldii J.W.Mathews & L.Bolus

Synonyms
- Watsonia ecklonii L.Bolus; Watsonia versfeldii var. alba J.W.Mathews & L.Bolus

Species of flowering plant

Watsonia versfeldii is a plant belonging to the genus Watsonia and forming part of the fynbos. The species is endemic to the Western Cape and occurs in the Piketberg and Porterville Mountains. There are a few small scattered, subpopulations but there are no threats to the plant.
