= Watsonia amatolae =

Scientific classification
- Kingdom: Plantae
- Clade: Tracheophytes
- Clade: Angiosperms
- Clade: Monocots
- Order: Asparagales
- Family: Iridaceae
- Genus: Watsonia
- Species: W. amatolae

Binomial name
- Watsonia amatolae Goldblatt

Species of flowering plant

Watsonia amatolae is a plant belonging to the genus Watsonia and is endemic to the Eastern Cape. Here it occurs in the Amathole Mountains from the Katberg and Gaika's Kop in the west to Hogsback and the Dohne Mountains in the east. The species has a range of 417 km^{2} and five subpopulations are known. The plant is not threatened but is considered rare.
