= Watsonia amabilis =

Scientific classification
- Kingdom: Plantae
- Clade: Tracheophytes
- Clade: Angiosperms
- Clade: Monocots
- Order: Asparagales
- Family: Iridaceae
- Genus: Watsonia
- Species: W. amabilis

Binomial name
- Watsonia amabilis Goldblatt

Species of flowering plant

Watsonia amabilis is a plant belonging to the genus Watsonia and is part of the fynbos. The species is endemic to the Western Cape where it occurs from Paarl to Sir Lowry's Pass. The plant was considered extinct but was rediscovered on a farm near Stellenbosch. The plant has lost its habitat due to urban development and agricultural activities. It is also threatened by fires and invasive plants.
