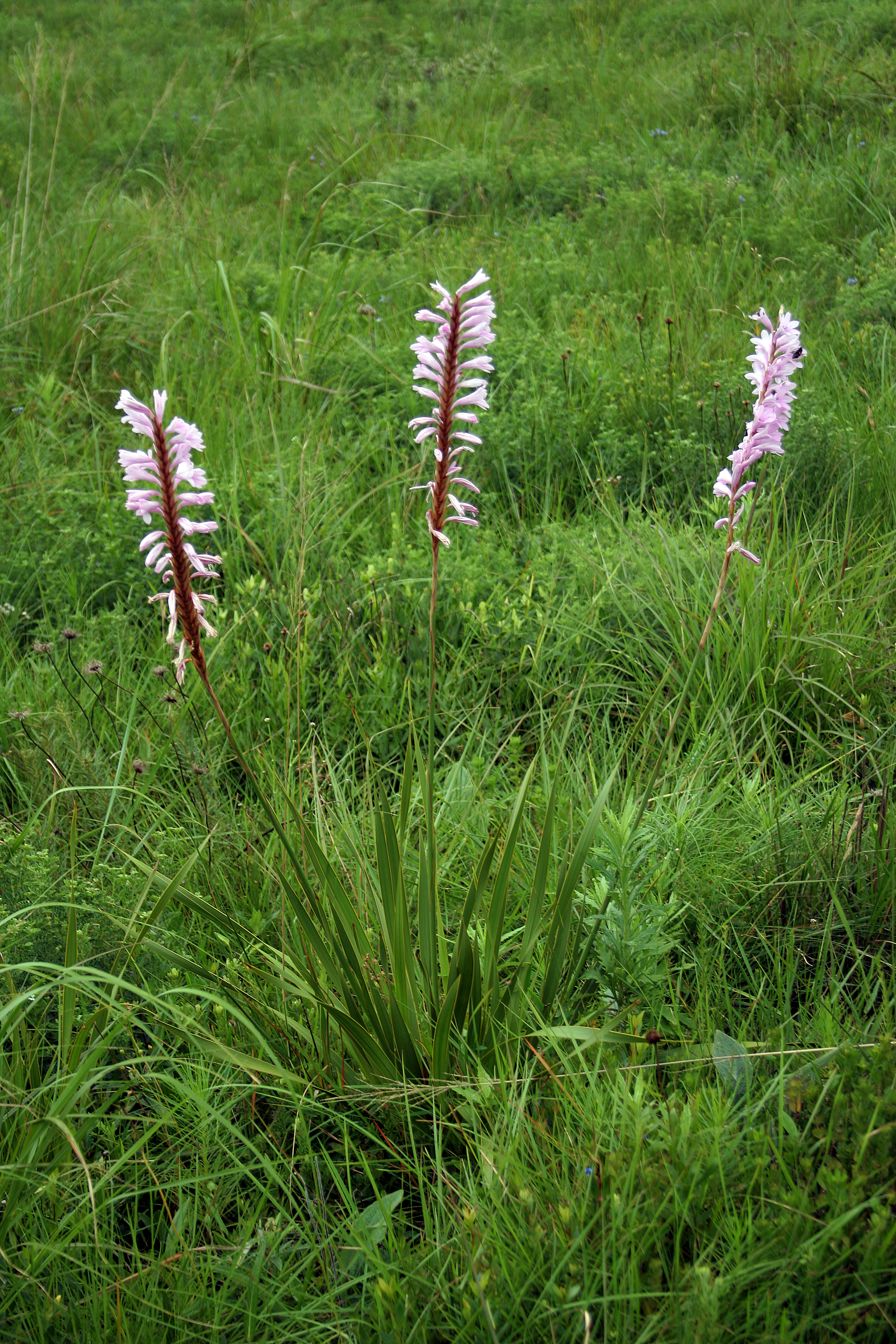

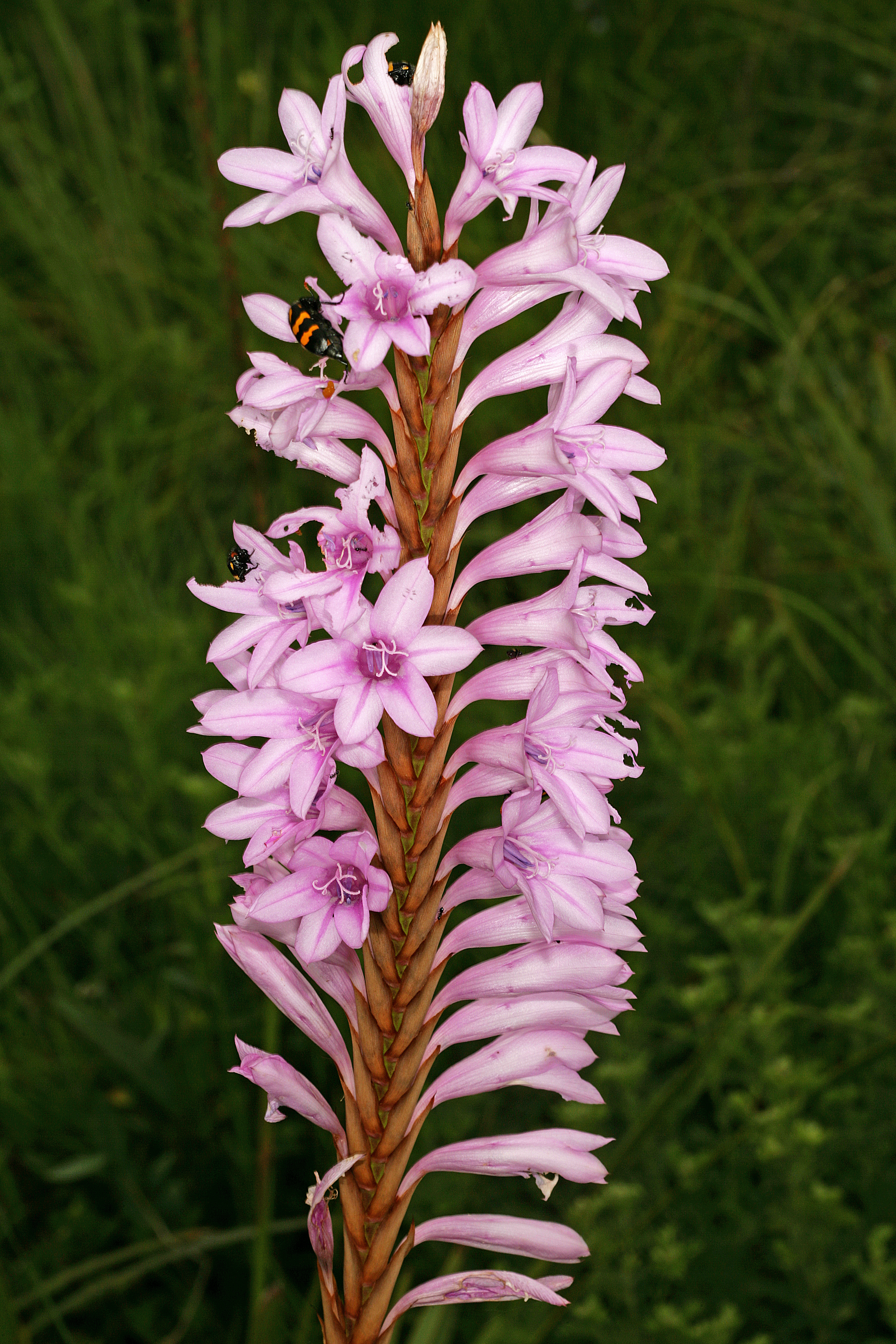

Scientific classification
- Kingdom: Plantae
- Clade: Tracheophytes
- Clade: Angiosperms
- Clade: Monocots
- Order: Asparagales
- Family: Iridaceae
- Genus: Watsonia
- Species: W. densiflora

Binomial name
- Watsonia densiflora Baker

Synonyms
- Watsonia densiflora var. alba N.E.Br.; Watsonia neglecta N.E.Br.; Watsonia plantii N.E.Br.

= Watsonia densiflora =

Species of flowering plant

Watsonia densiflora is a plant belonging to the genus Watsonia. The species is endemic to KwaZulu-Natal and the Eastern Cape.
