= Watsonia rogersii =

Scientific classification
- Kingdom: Plantae
- Clade: Tracheophytes
- Clade: Angiosperms
- Clade: Monocots
- Order: Asparagales
- Family: Iridaceae
- Genus: Watsonia
- Species: W. rogersii

Binomial name
- Watsonia rogersii L.Bolus

Synonyms
- Watsonia middlemostii L.Bolus

Species of flowering plant

Watsonia rogersii is a plant belonging to the genus Watsonia and is part of the fynbos. The species is endemic to the Western Cape and occurs in the Hottentots Holland Mountains, Kogelberg and eastwards to Hermanus and the Riviersonderend Mountains near Villiersdorp. There are ten known subpopulations, four of which are in nature reserves and are therefore protected. The subpopulations outside the reserves are threatened by invasive plants, agriculture and urban development.
