= Watsonia fergusoniae =

Scientific classification
- Kingdom: Plantae
- Clade: Tracheophytes
- Clade: Angiosperms
- Clade: Monocots
- Order: Asparagales
- Family: Iridaceae
- Genus: Watsonia
- Species: W. fergusoniae

Binomial name
- Watsonia fergusoniae L.Bolus

Species of flowering plant

Watsonia fergusoniae is a geophyte belonging to the genus Watsonia and is part of the fynbos. The species is endemic to the Western Cape and occurs from the Agulhas Plain to the Gourits River. The plant is threatened by invasive plants and excessive flower picking.
