= Watsonia fourcadei =

Scientific classification
- Kingdom: Plantae
- Clade: Tracheophytes
- Clade: Angiosperms
- Clade: Monocots
- Order: Asparagales
- Family: Iridaceae
- Genus: Watsonia
- Species: W. fourcadei

Binomial name
- Watsonia fourcadei J.W.Mathews & L.Bolus

Synonyms
- Watsonia ryderae L.Bolus; Watsonia stanfordiae L.Bolus

Species of flowering plant

Watsonia fourcadei is a plant belonging to the genus Watsonia and is part of the fynbos. The species is endemic to the Eastern Cape and the Western Cape.
