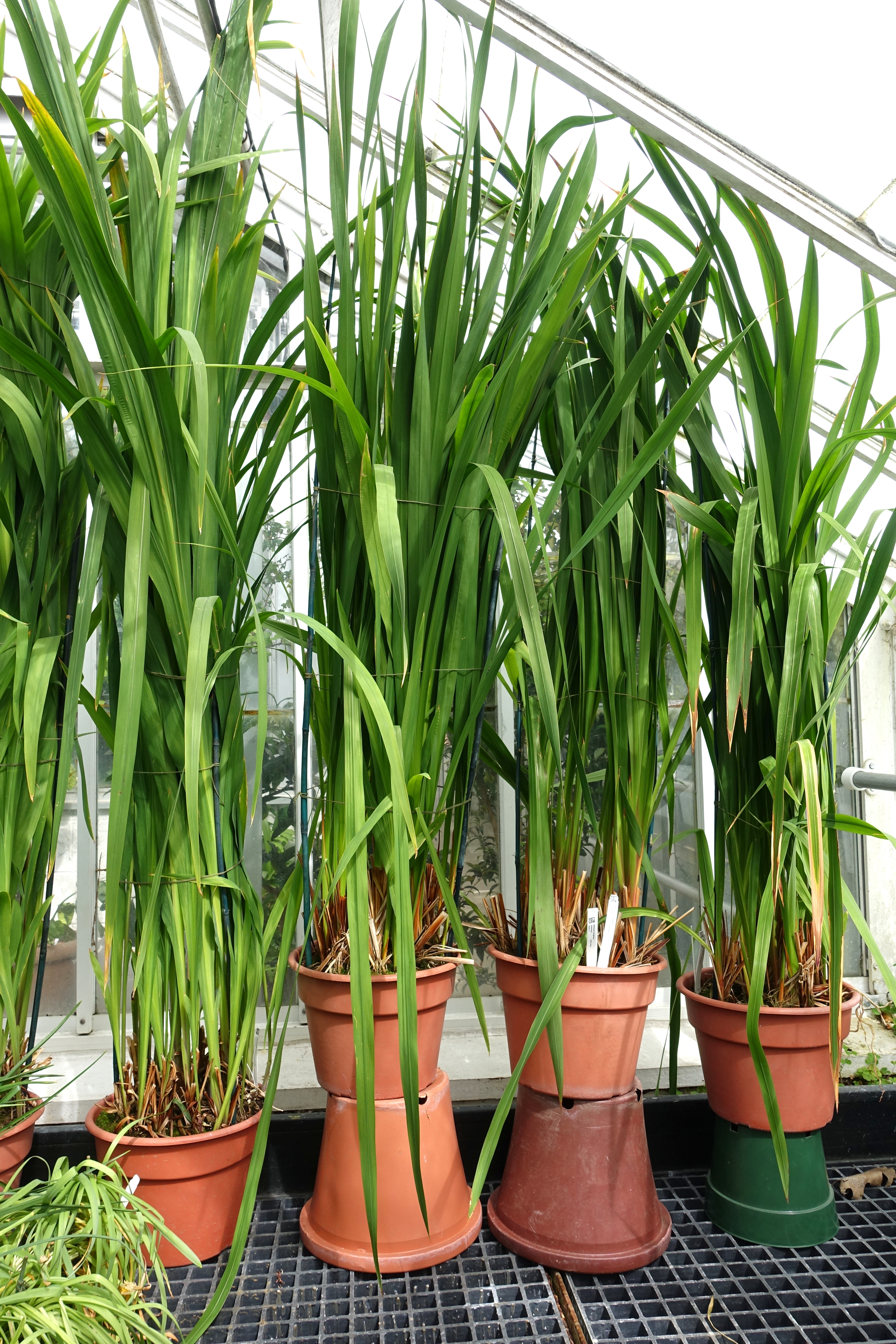

Scientific classification
- Kingdom: Plantae
- Clade: Tracheophytes
- Clade: Angiosperms
- Clade: Monocots
- Order: Asparagales
- Family: Iridaceae
- Genus: Watsonia
- Species: W. marginata

Binomial name
- Watsonia marginata (L.f.) Ker Gawl.

= Watsonia marginata =

Species of flowering plant

Watsonia marginata is a species of flowering plant in the family Iridaceae known by the common name fragrant bugle-lily. It is native to the Cape Provinces of South Africa, but it is well known as an ornamental plant grown in gardens for its showy spikes of flowers. Its native range is an area with winter rainfall and dry summers. It is a perennial herb growing from a corm and growing to a maximum height well over one metre when in flower, sometimes reaching two metres. Each corm produces three or four erect leaves that measure up to 80 cm long by 5 wide. They are blue-green with thickened yellow margins. The inflorescence is a dense spike of 30 to 50 flowers which may be any shade of pink or sometimes dark red or white. The flower is actinomorphic, or radially symmetrical, unlike those of other Watsonia, which are zygomorphic. The flowers are several cm long.

Like some other Watsonia, this species can escape cultivation and take hold in the wild as a weedy introduced species in appropriate climates. It can be found in Western Australia and California.
