= Christian Friedrich Ecklon =

Danish botanical collector and apothecary

- Born: 17 December 1795; Åbenrå, Denmark
- Died: 1 December 1868 (aged 72); Cape Town, Cape Colony
- Known for: Research on plants of South Africa
- Scientific career
- Fields: Botany, apothecary
- Author abbrev. (botany): Eckl.

Christian Friedrich Ecklon (17 December 1795 – 1 December 1868) was a Danish botanical collector and apothecary. Ecklon is especially known for being an avid collector and researcher of plants in South Africa.

== Biography ==
Ecklon was from Åbenrå, Denmark. He was trained as a pharmacist in Kiel. He first went to South Africa in 1823. During his visit he worked as an apothecary whilst also looking for plants with medicinal value. A shortage of funds and deteriorating health forced him to live in poor circumstances. When he returned to Europe in 1828, he had collected an extensive herbarium and published first specimens of his voyages as an exsiccata in cooperation with Unio Itineraria, a Württemberg Botanical Society which had been organized by botanist Christian Ferdinand Friedrich Hochstetter (1787–1860) and physician Ernst Gottlieb von Steudel (1783–1856). During his stay in Hamburg from 1833 to 1838, he worked on revising his collection. This herbarium would become the basis for the Flora Capensis (1860–1865) by his friend, Hamburg botanist Otto Wilhelm Sonder (1812–1881) in collaboration with the British botanist William Henry Harvey (1811–1866). The herbarium was later sold to Unio Itineraria.

Ecklon received a travel scholarship from the Danish government and in 1829 he went again to Cape Town where until 1833, together with the German botanist and entomologist, Karl Ludwig Philipp Zeyher (1799–1858), he collected a sizable herbarium, a large part of which was handed over to the University of Copenhagen and the University of Kiel. From 1833-38, he lived in Hamburg and began the publication of descriptions of South African plants in Enumeratio Plantarum Africae Australis Extratropicae, a descriptive catalogue of South African plants in three parts which appeared (1835–37). With Zeyher he issued the exsiccata-like specimen series Plantae Africae australis extratropicae. In 1838 he travelled again to the Cape where he remained until his death in 1868.

== Legacy ==
According to IPNI, Ecklon named a total of 1,974 different genera or species. The genus Ecklonia (a genus of kelp (brown algae) belonging to the family Lessoniaceae), including Ecklon's kelp (Ecklonia biruncinata or E. radiata), as well as Ecklon's Purple Iceplant (Delosperma ecklonis 'Bright Eyes') and Ecklon's Everlasting (Helichrysum ecklonis) were named in his honour. This botanist is denoted by the author abbreviation Eckl. when citing a botanical name. Specimens collected by Ecklon are cared for at multiple herbaria, including the National Herbarium of Victoria (MEL), Royal Botanic Gardens Victoria.

== Other Sources ==
- William H. Harvey, Otto Wilhelm Sonder, William Turner Thiselton-Dyer (Editor). Flora Capensis: Being a Systematic Description of the Plants of the Cape Colony, Caffraria, & Port Natal (and Neighbouring Territories) (January 1900); ISBN 3-7682-0637-8
