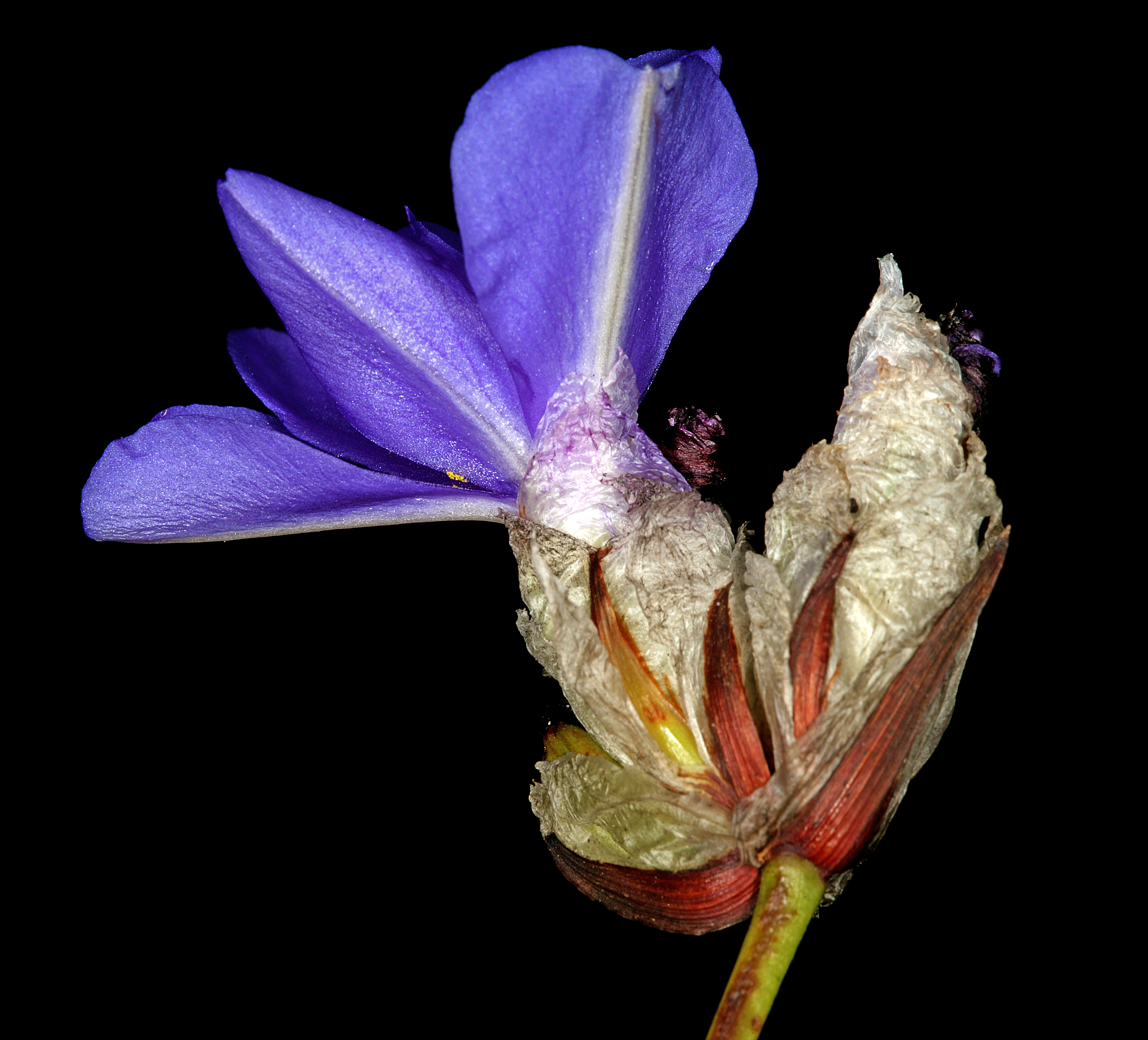

Conservation status
- Near Threatened (SANBI Red List)

Scientific classification
- Kingdom: Plantae
- Clade: Tracheophytes
- Clade: Angiosperms
- Clade: Monocots
- Order: Asparagales
- Family: Iridaceae
- Genus: Aristea
- Species: A. oligocephala

Binomial name
- Aristea oligocephala Baker

Synonyms
- Aristea dichotoma var. macrocephala Schltr.

= Aristea oligocephala =

Species of flowering plant

Aristea oligocephala, commonly known as the few-headed aristea, is a cormous geophyte belonging to the genus Aristea. The species is endemic to the Western Cape of South Africa. It occurs from the Hottentots Holland Mountains to Bredasdorp. The plant has an extent of occurrence of 6,881 km² and is part of the fynbos. It is threatened by invasive plants.
