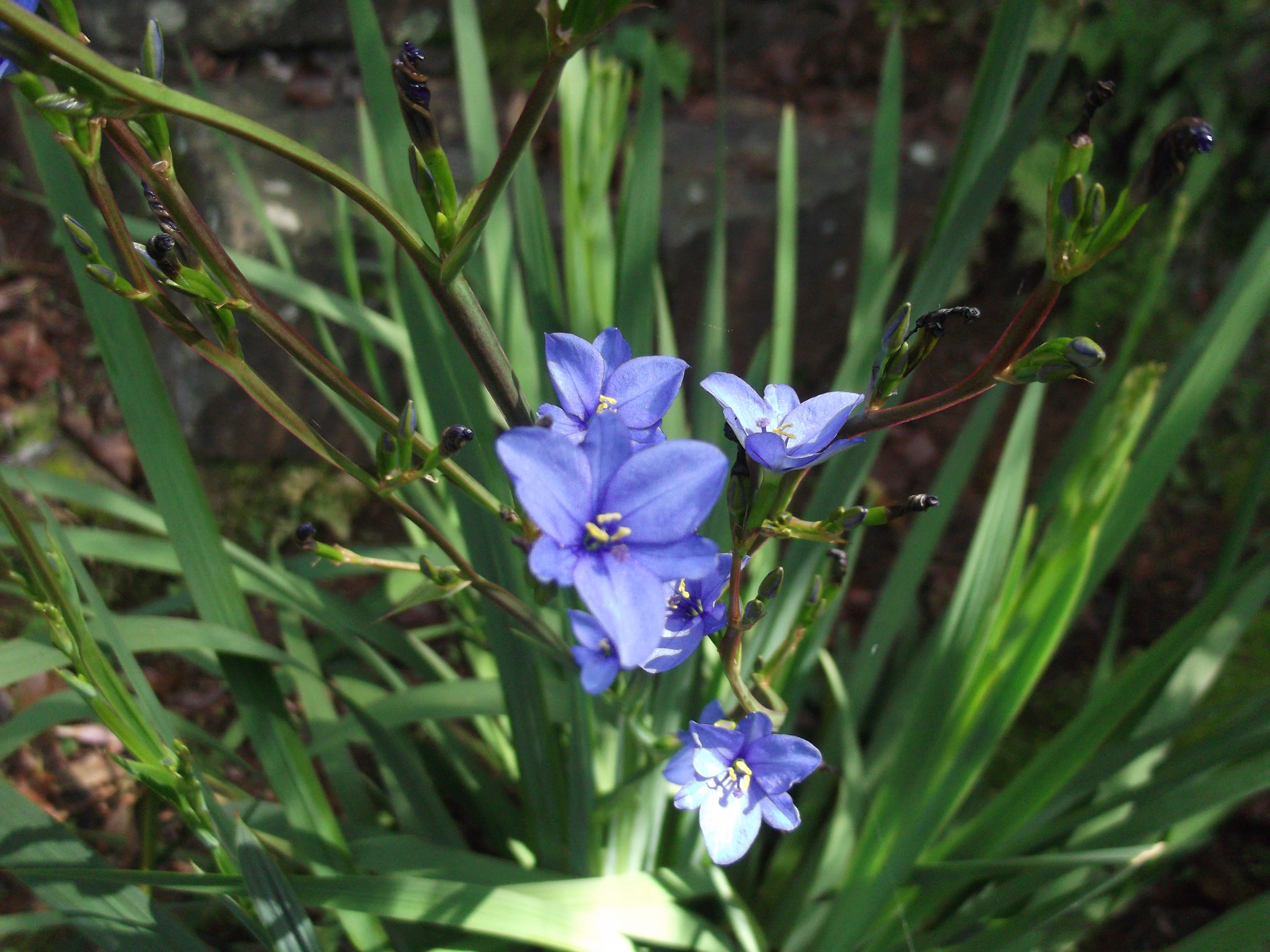

Scientific classification
- Kingdom: Plantae
- Clade: Tracheophytes
- Clade: Angiosperms
- Clade: Monocots
- Order: Asparagales
- Family: Iridaceae
- Genus: Aristea
- Species: A. ecklonii

Binomial name
- Aristea ecklonii Baker 1877

Synonyms
- Aristea dichotoma Eckl. ex Klatt 1866 not (Thunb.) Ker Gawl. 1827; Aristea lastii Baker; Aristea paniculata Pax; Aristea cyanea De Wild. 1921 not Aiton 1789; Aristea maitlandii Hutch. published without description; Aristea stipitata R.C.Foster

= Aristea ecklonii =

Species of flowering plant

Aristea ecklonii (common names: blue flies, blue stars, blue-eyed iris, blue corn-lily) is a plant species in the Iridaceae, first described in 1866. It is native to central and southern Africa from South Africa north to Cameroon and Tanzania. The plant is an evergreen perennial with small, blue flowers, growing in clumps with upright, grass-like leaves 15–18 in (38–46 cm) in height.

It is an invasive species in high mountain forests of Sri Lanka near Nuwara Eliya and Horton Plains, in New Zealand where it is listed as a pest species on the NPPA banned list, and also Australia.
