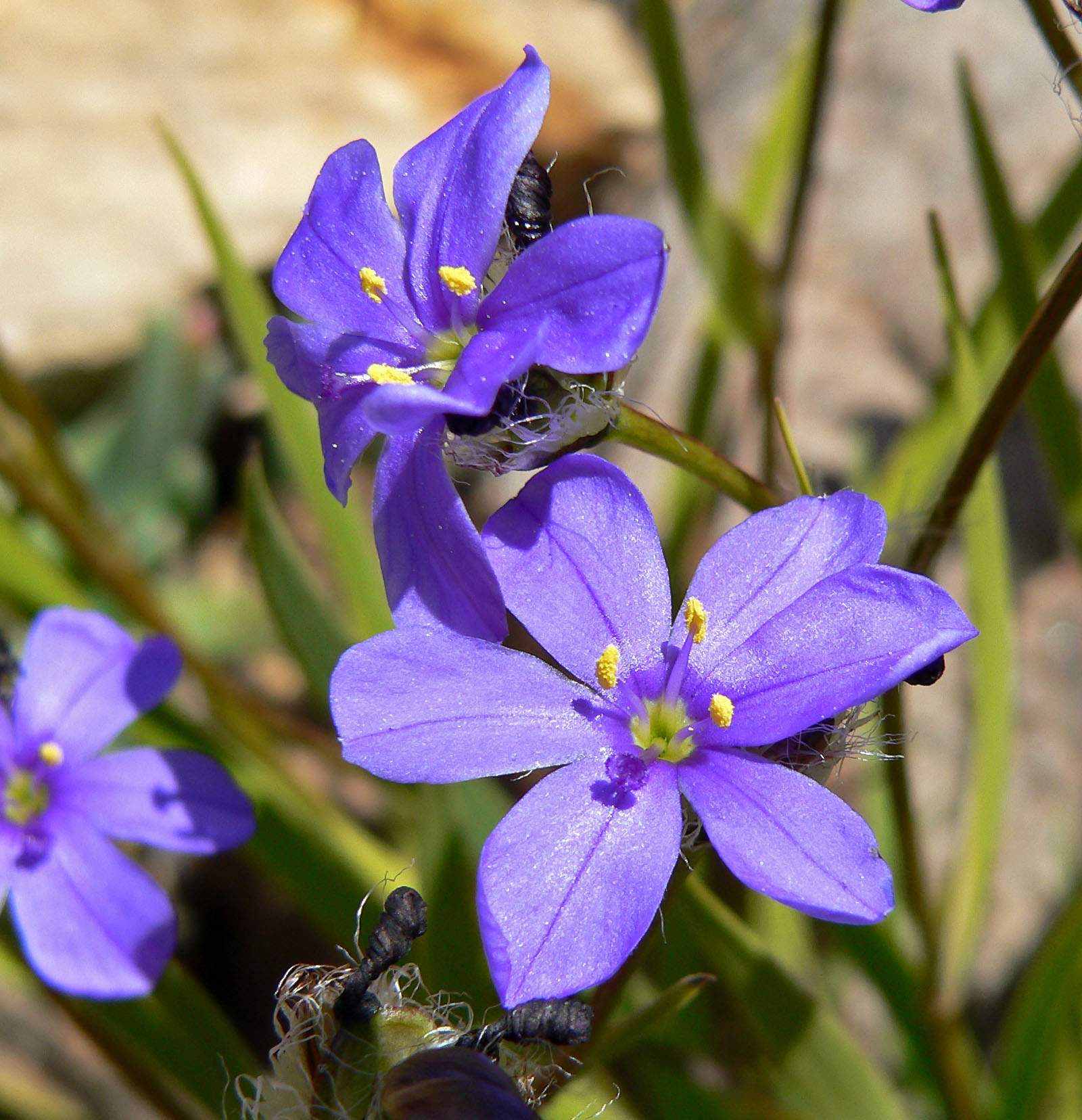
- Aristea africana

Scientific classification
- Kingdom: Plantae
- Clade: Tracheophytes
- Clade: Angiosperms
- Clade: Monocots
- Order: Asparagales
- Family: Iridaceae
- Subfamily: Aristeoideae; Vines
- Genus: Aristea; Aiton

Type species
- Aristea africana (L.) Hofmannsegg

Synonyms
- Cleanthe Salisb. ex Benth. & Hook.f.; Ixia L., rejected name; Sisyrinchium Eckl. 1827 not L. 1753 nor Mill. 1754

= Aristea =

Genus of flowering plants

Aristea is a genus of evergreen, perennial and rhizomatous species of flowering plants in the family Iridaceae, first described in 1789. The plants can differ in height between about 15 cm (5.9 in) to up to 1½ m and grow from, often woody, rhizomes, short rootstocks, or corm-like bases. The iris-like leaves grow in clumps, tufts or with few together and from the heart of these upright and often flattened stems arise that carry clusters of briefly flowering six-merous, star-symmetrical, mostly blue but rarely purplish to whitish, saucer-shaped blooms, subtended by green to brown or papery sheaths. The genus is distributed in tropical and southern Africa, as well as Madagascar. The genus name is derived from the Greek word arista, meaning "awn". In 2026 a total of 58 species are recognised.

== Description ==
Blousuurkanol species are evergreen, perennial plants with erect to creeping rhizomes or in case of Aristea singularis above-ground stolons. The stems can be simple or have few to many branches and are rounded or in cross-section have two sharp corners, ridges, or thin, flat extensions of tissue (or "wings") running along its sides. The leaves are flattened in a plane parallel to the main stem, cylindrical or needle-shaped, are set in two vertical rows mostly near the base of the stem, and get progressively smaller further up. The leaves lack a vein along the margins as well as a layer of hard, thick-walled, dead support-cells directly below the outer skin (epidermis), unlike some other Iridaceae genera. However, the leaves derive rigidity from thickened skin cells arranged in columns along their margins. The inflorescence consists of paired, fan-like flower clusters or paired single flowers that are seated or have a stalk, and are enclosed by two leafy or dry spaths, that may have a margin that is entire, irregularly torn or fringed. The bracts subtending the individual flowers are comparable to the spaths but mostly smaller, with a forked tip and often two keels. The scentless flowers are star-symmetrical except for the excentric style, upright to nodding, and are usually fresh for less than a day, in few species for two days.The perianth is usually dark blue, but in some species mauve, pink, light blue or white, sometimes with a diffently coloured honey guide. When the flower is spent, it twists into a spiral and remains attached. The flowers do not produce nectar with the exception of Aristea spiralis, that has nectar-producing glands on the perianth. The perianth consists of an outer and an inner whorl of three spreading tepals each, which are only merged at the base. The outer tepals may be equal in length as the inner or somewhat shorter, and are always somewhat narrower, and may sometimes be brown or almost black. The six stamens are free, with line-shaped filaments, topped by oblong to line-shaped yellow anthers. The stamens are equal except in Aristea inaequalis. The inferior ovary is oblong, three-sided and higher than wide, or top-shaped, and are topped by a line-shaped, excentric style that ends in three minute notches or spreading, entire or fringed lobes. Each of the three locules may contain only one or two, or many seeds. The seeds are rounded to angular, shortly cylindric, or flattened and winged. Seeds may be light to dark brown or dark red-brown. Cells contain 8 pairs of homologous chromosomes (2n=16).

== Taxonomy ==
The first species of blousuurkanol that was validly described was named Ixia africana by Carl Linnaeus in 1753 in the first volume of his book Species Plantarum that is considered as the starting point of the binominal nomenclature (now Aristea africana). The name Ixia was however also used for another Iridaceae genus, the corn lilies, and was repressed for its use for blousuurkanol. In this volume of the Species Plantarum Linnaeus also described Gladiolus capitatus (now Aristea capitata). His son, Carl Linnaeus the Younger, described in 1782 Moraea lugens (now Aristea lugens) and Moraea spiralis (now Aristea spiralis). In 1787, Carl Peter Thunberg describes Moraea caerulea (now Aristea bracteata) and Moraea pusilla (now Aristea pusilla). Aristea, a replacement name for the genus was published in the Hortus Kewensis that was compiled by William Aiton in 1789 work, though it is assumed that it makes use of scientific work by Daniel Solander that remained unpublished due to his early death. Thunberg described in 1800 Moraea dichotoma (now Aristea dichotoma). German botanist Friedrich Wilhelm Klatt described Aristea anceps based on a suggestion by Danish plant collector Christian Friedrich Ecklon. John Gilbert Baker, the keeper of the Kew Herbarium in 1876 described Aristea juncifolia, Aristea madagascariensis and Aristea racemosa. He also described in the same publication Aristea schizolaena, based on a name suggested by William Henry Harvey who had died in the previous year, followed in 1877 by Aristea ecklonii and Aristea compressa, the latter based on a name suggested by Buching. In 1878 Baker described Aristea angolensis. Aristea glauca and Aristea torulosa were described Klatt in 1882. In 1883 a new replacement name, Cleanthe was published by George Bentham and J.D. Hooker based on a suggestion by Richard Anthony Salisbury, but this name is superfluous. In 1883 Baker named Aristea angustifolia, Aristea cladocarpa and Aristea kitchingii. Aristea alata was named by Baker in 1885. He distinguished Aristea platycaulis in 1887. In 1891 Baker published the name Aristea majubensis. In 1892 Baker named Aristea flexicaulis, Aristea oligocephala and Aristea zeyeri. He also named Aristea paniculata (now Aristea bakeri), but that name had been used earlier that year by Ferdinand Albin Pax, rendering it an illegitimate homonym even though Pax' name is a later synonym (of Aristea ecklonii). In 1892 Adolf Engler distinguished Aristea abyssinica, a name suggested by Pax. Baker named Aristea montana in 1896 and Aristea nyikensis in 1897. In 1899, German botanist Rudolf Schlechter distinguished Aristea palustris. In 1900 Hermann Harms described Aristea goetzei, and Anthony Wolley-Dod named Aristea pauciflora. In 1901 Harms distinguished Aristea polycephala. Baker described in 1906 Aristea parviflora. Also in 1906, the Swiss medical docter and naturalist Heinrich Rudolf Schinz named Aristea cuspidata. Aristea bequaertii was described by Belgian botanist Émile De Wildeman in 1913. In 1922 American botanist and plant collector John Muir described Aristea ensifolia in a publication by Harry Bolus. English botanist John Hutchinson distinguished Aristea djalonis in 1939. Aristea humbertii was named that same year by Joseph Perrier de la Bâthie, a French botanist specialised in Madagascar. August Henning Weimarck distinguished Aristea biflora, Aristea grandis, Aristea recisa, Aristea simplex and Aristea singularis in 1940. He also described Aristea galpini that year based on a name suggested by Nicholas Edward Brown. In the same publication by Weimmark, the South African botanist Gwendoline Lewis described Aristea rigidifolia. In 1952 she characterised Aristea latifolia. In 1995 Peter Goldblatt distinguished Aristea ranofana. Goldblatt described with John Manning Aristea fimbrata, Aristea inaequalis, Aristea rupicola and Aristea teretifolia in 1997. Goldblatt together with Anthony P. Dold distinguished Aristea elliptica in 2005. Goldblad and Manning named Aristea nigrescens in 2007. In 2013 Aristea farafangana was distinguished by Goldblatt and Peter Phillipson. Aristea rufobracteata was described by Goldblatt and Manning in 2015.

=== Species overview ===
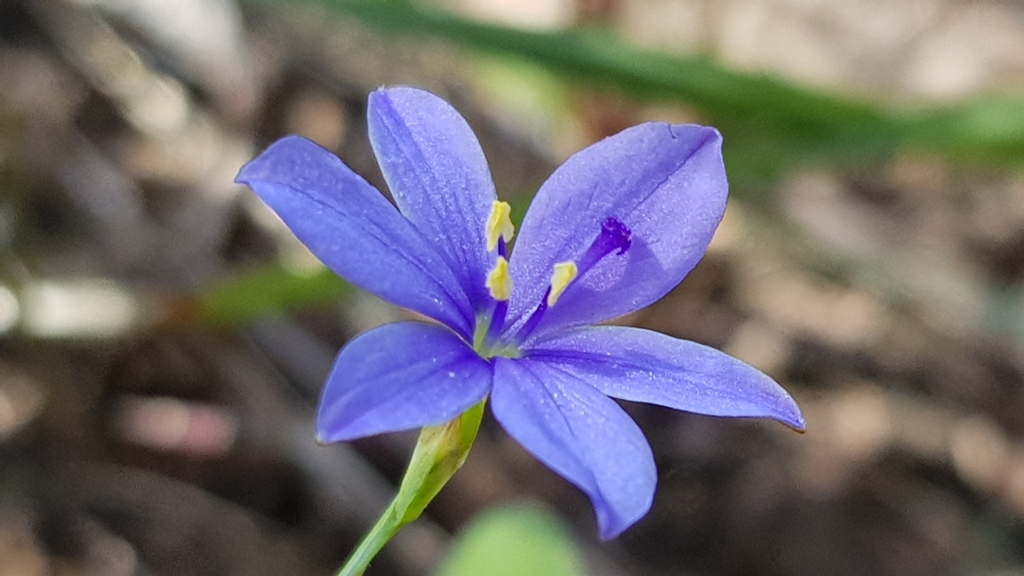
Aristea abyssinica

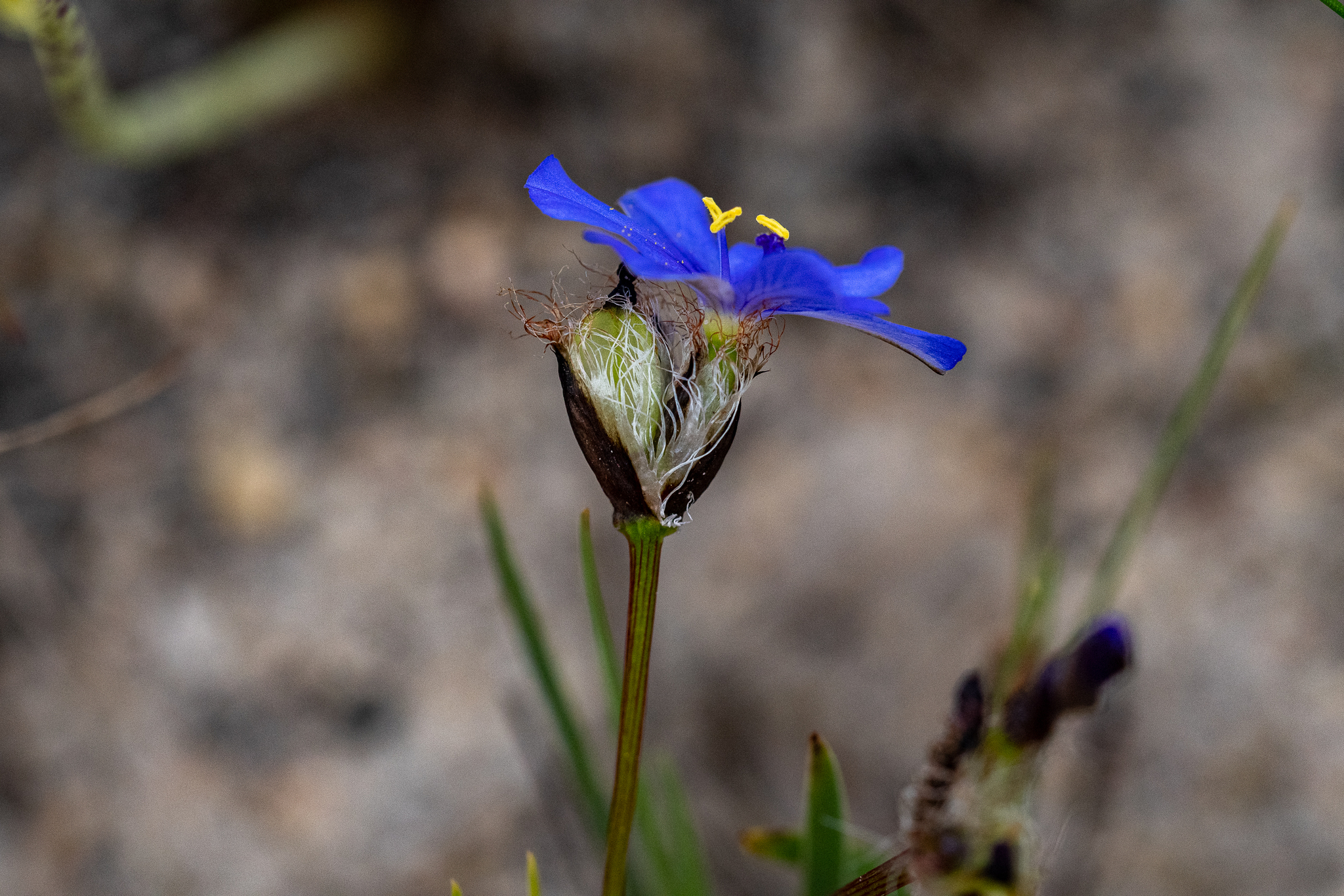
Aristea africana

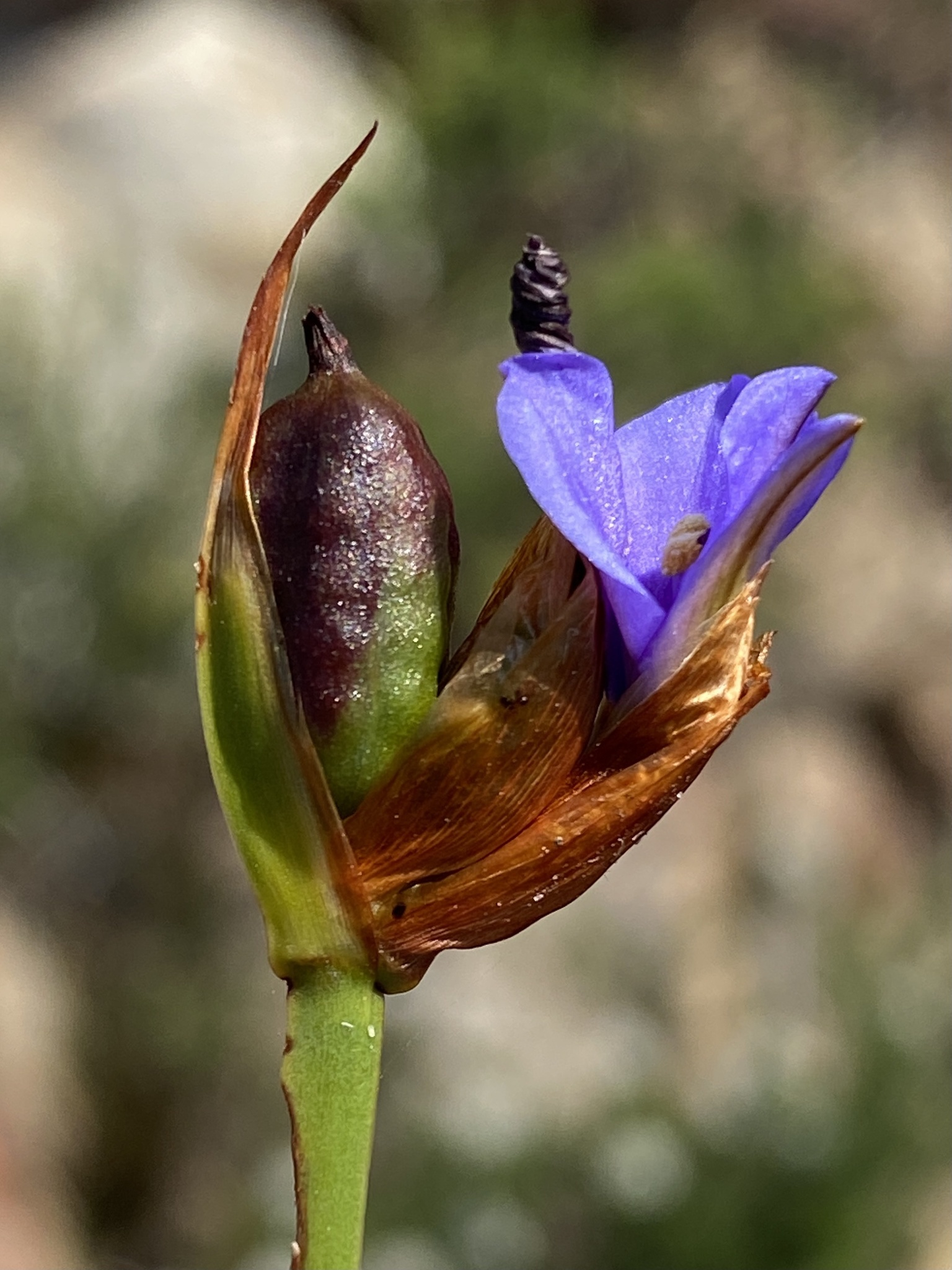
Aristea anceps

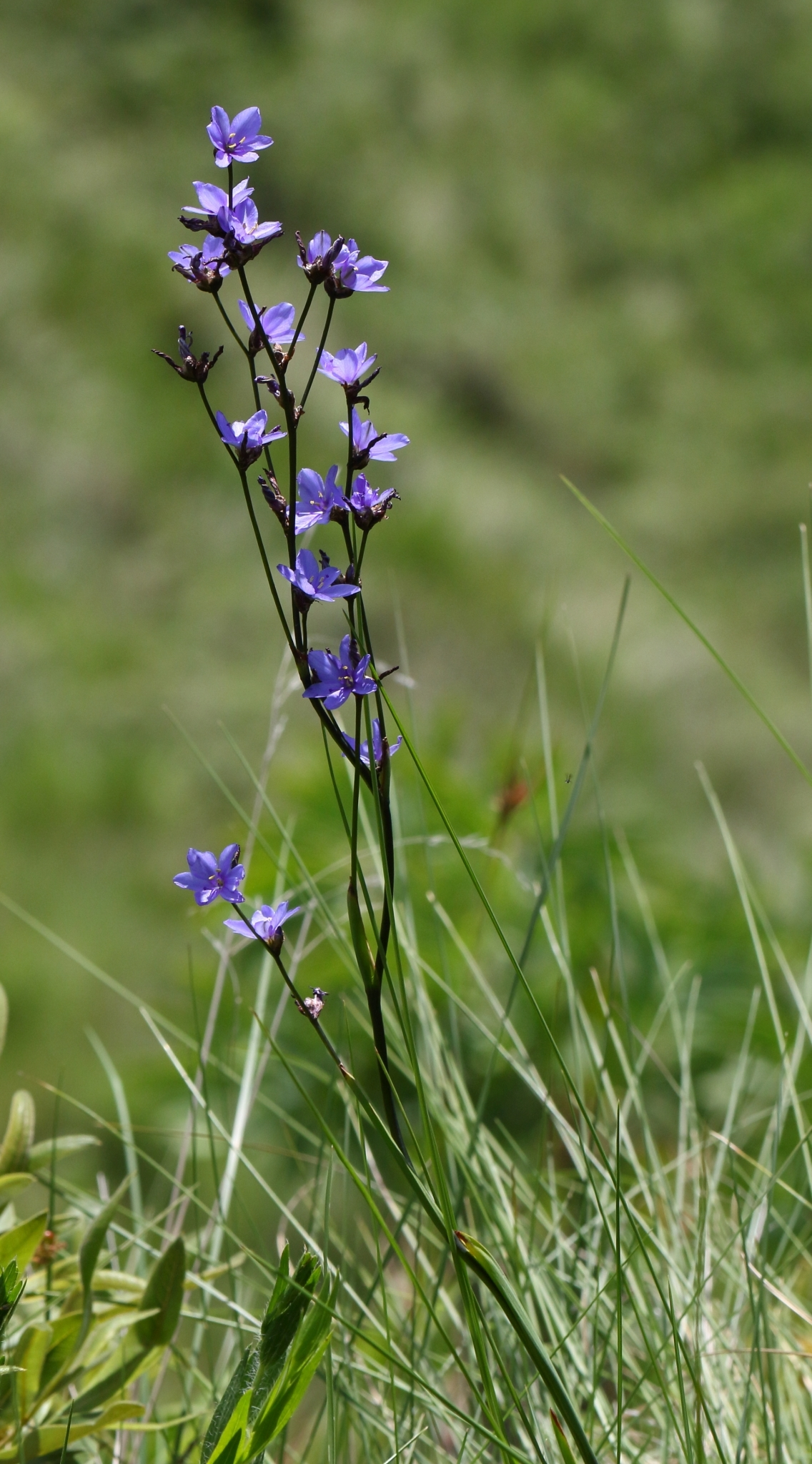
Aristea angolensis

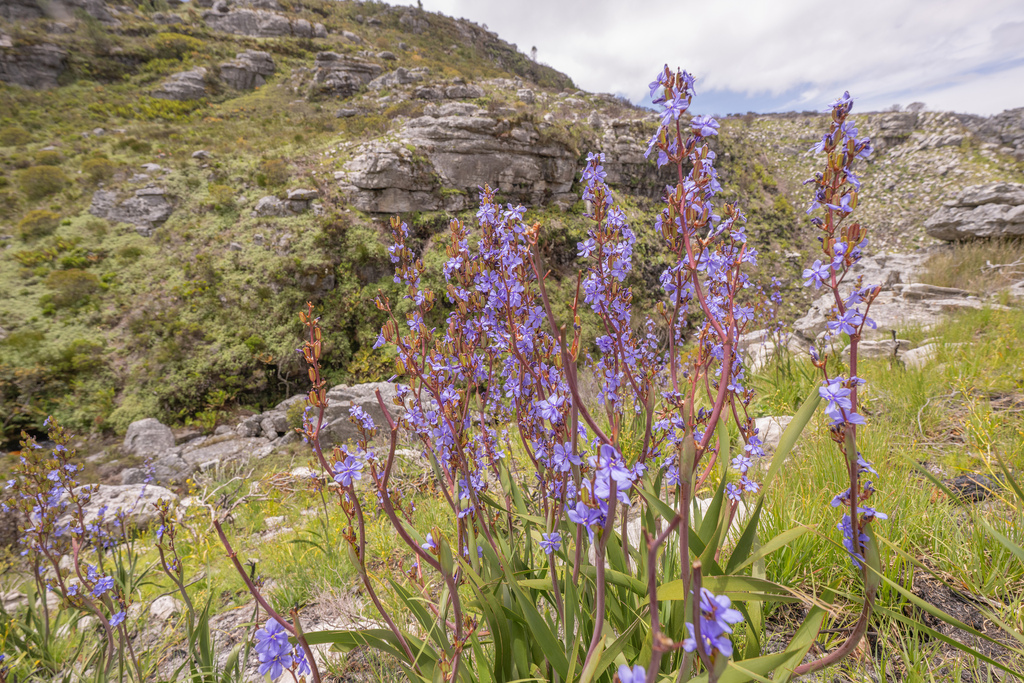
Aristea bakeri

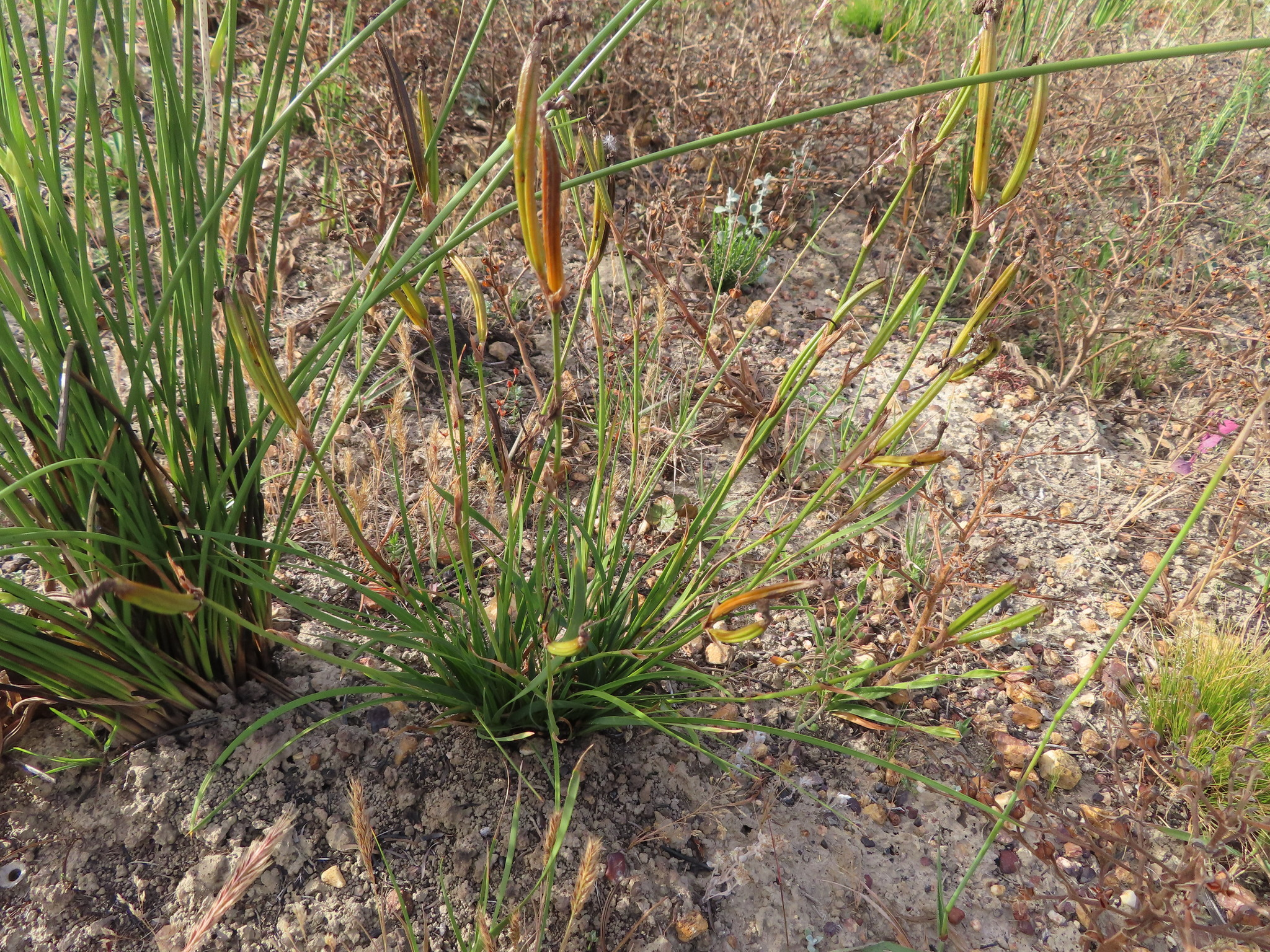
Aristea biflora

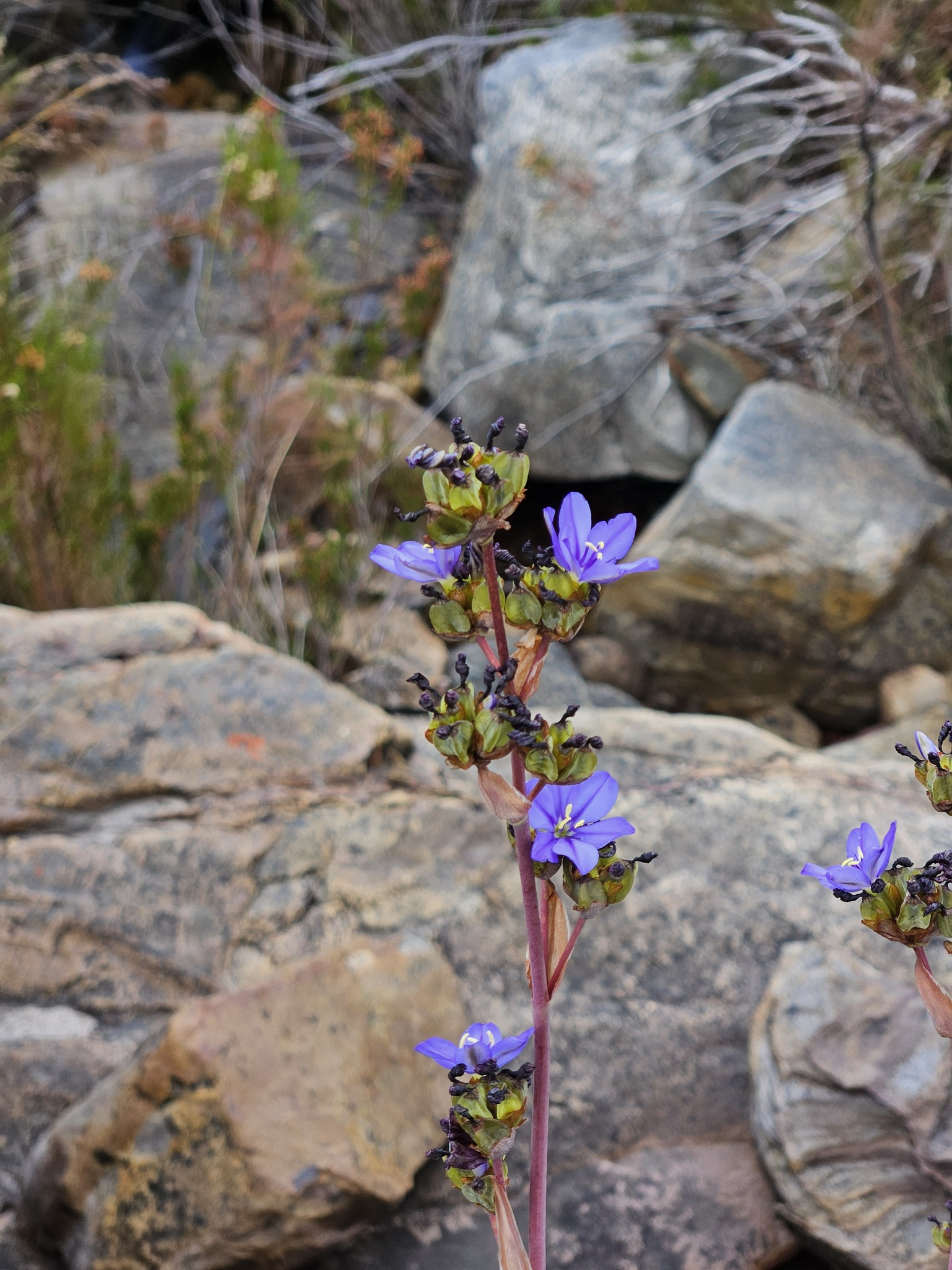
Aristea bracteata

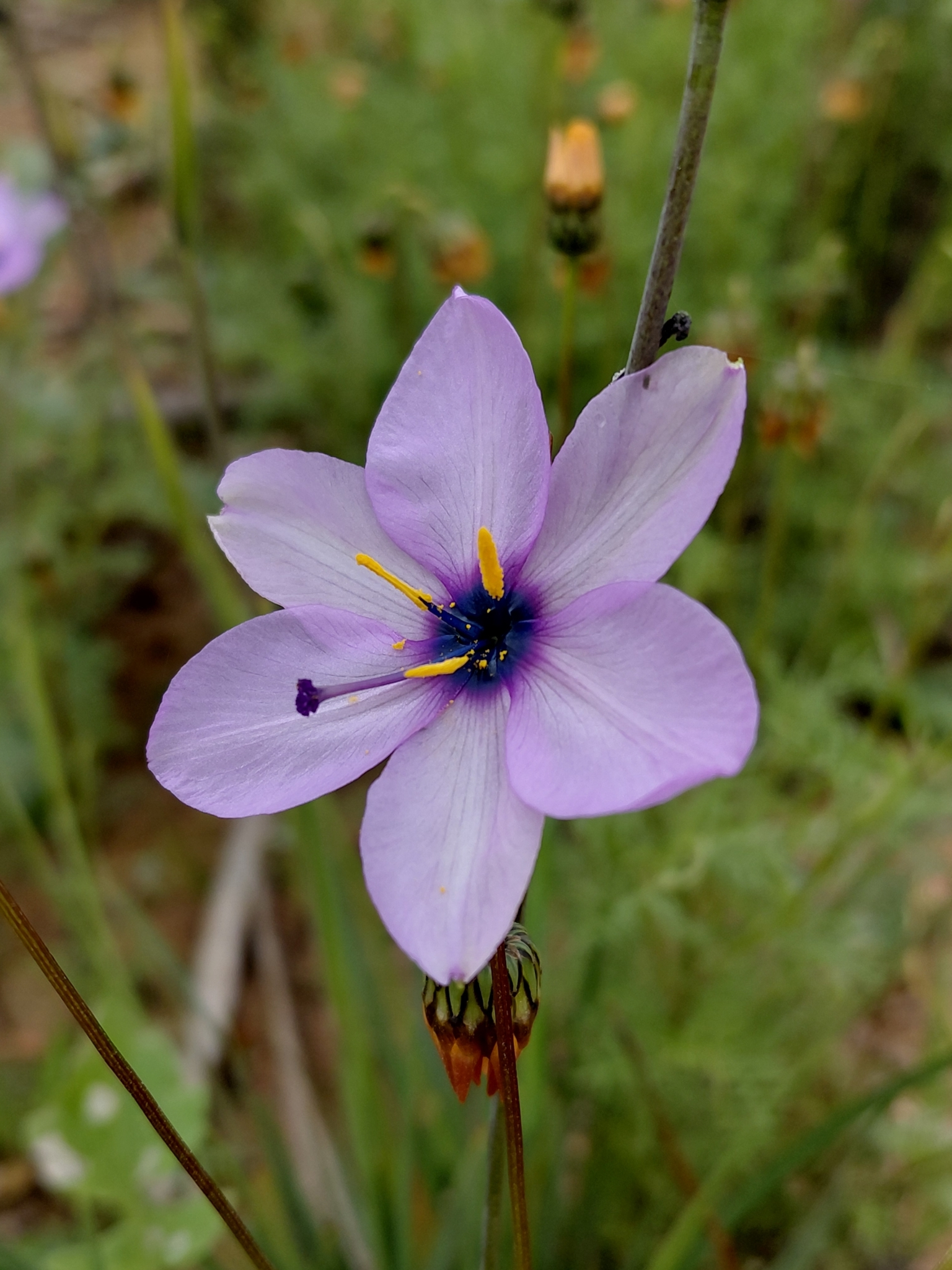
Aristea cantharophila

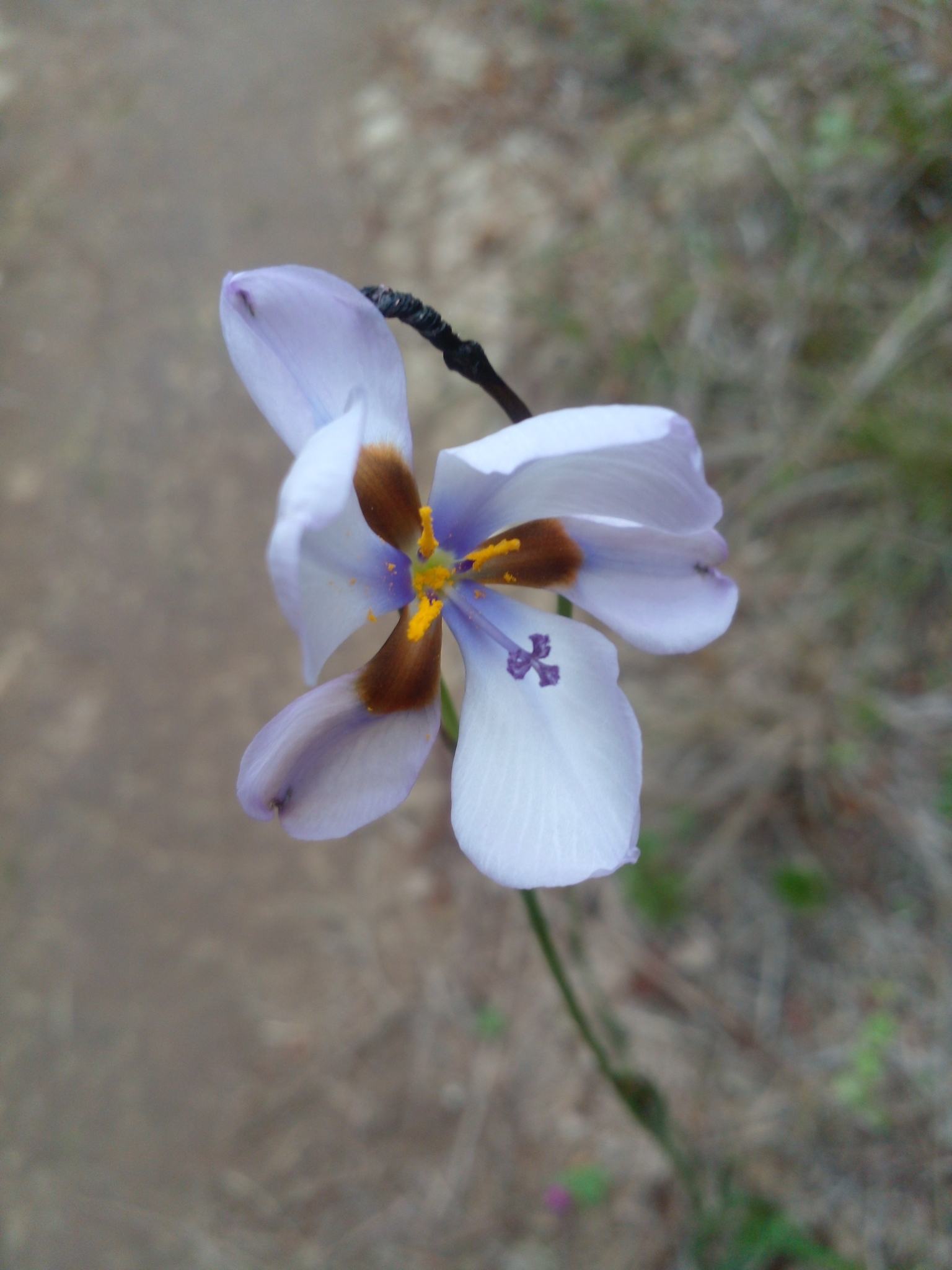
Aristea cistiflora

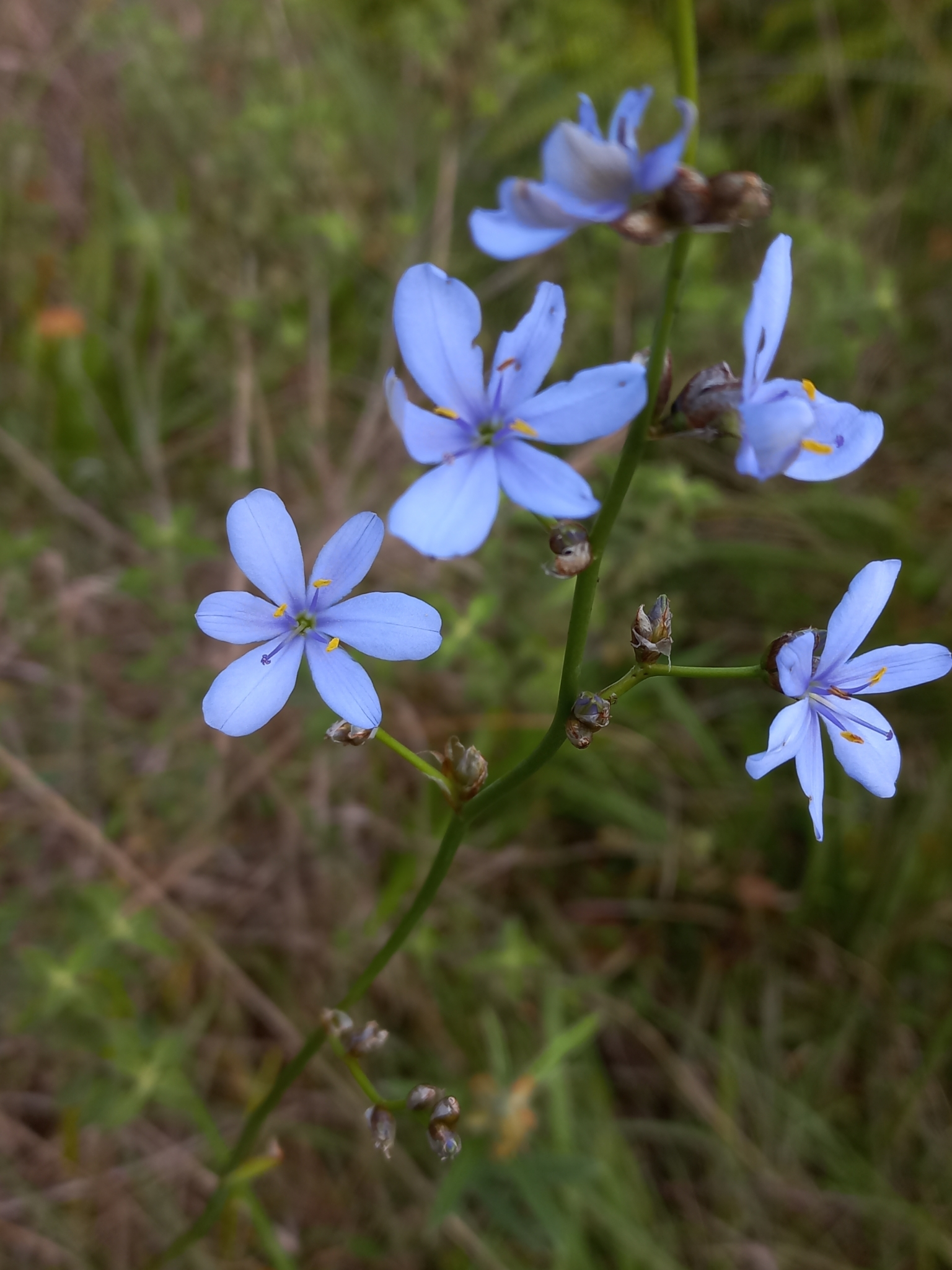
Aristea compressa

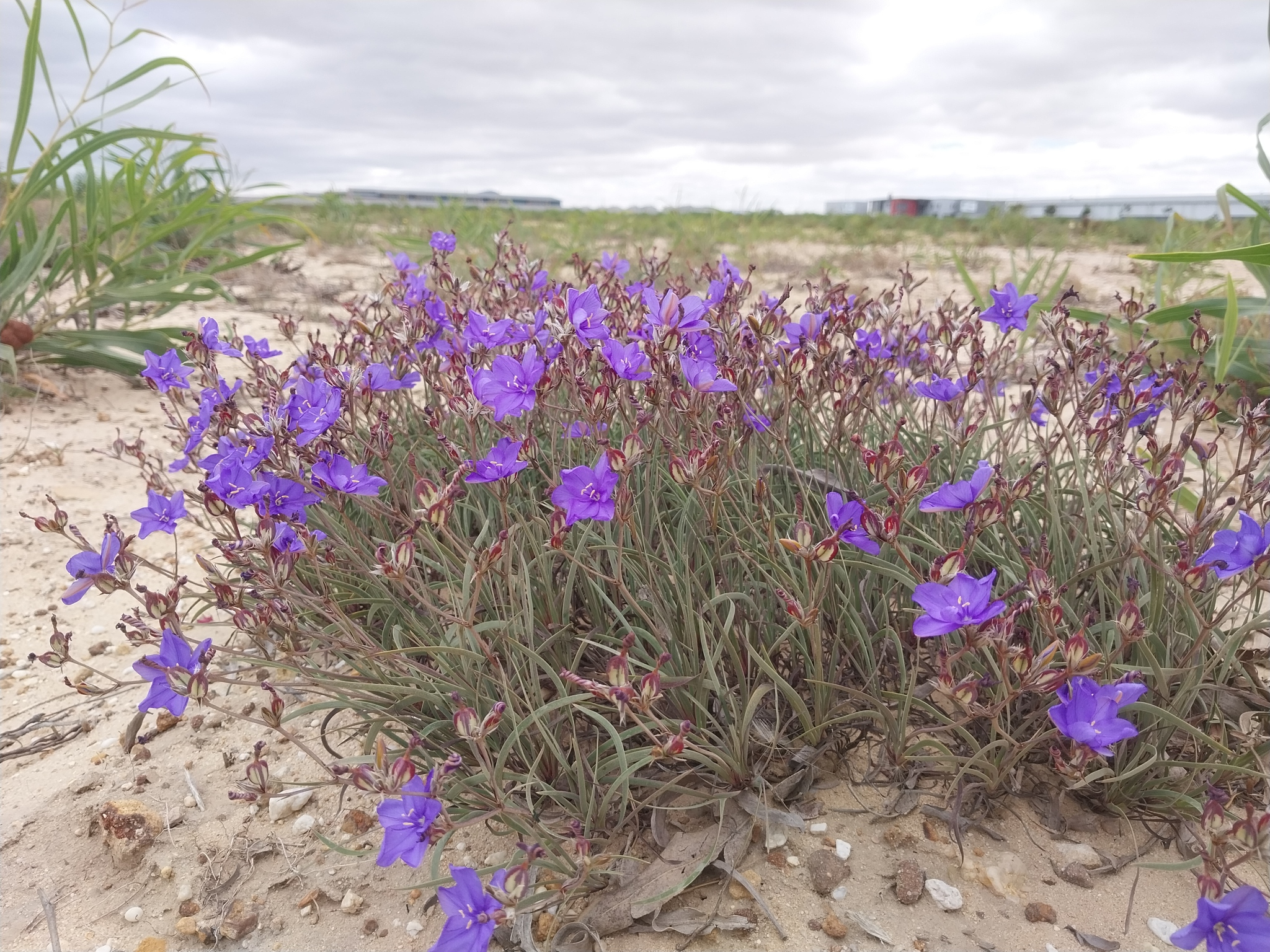
Aristea dichotoma

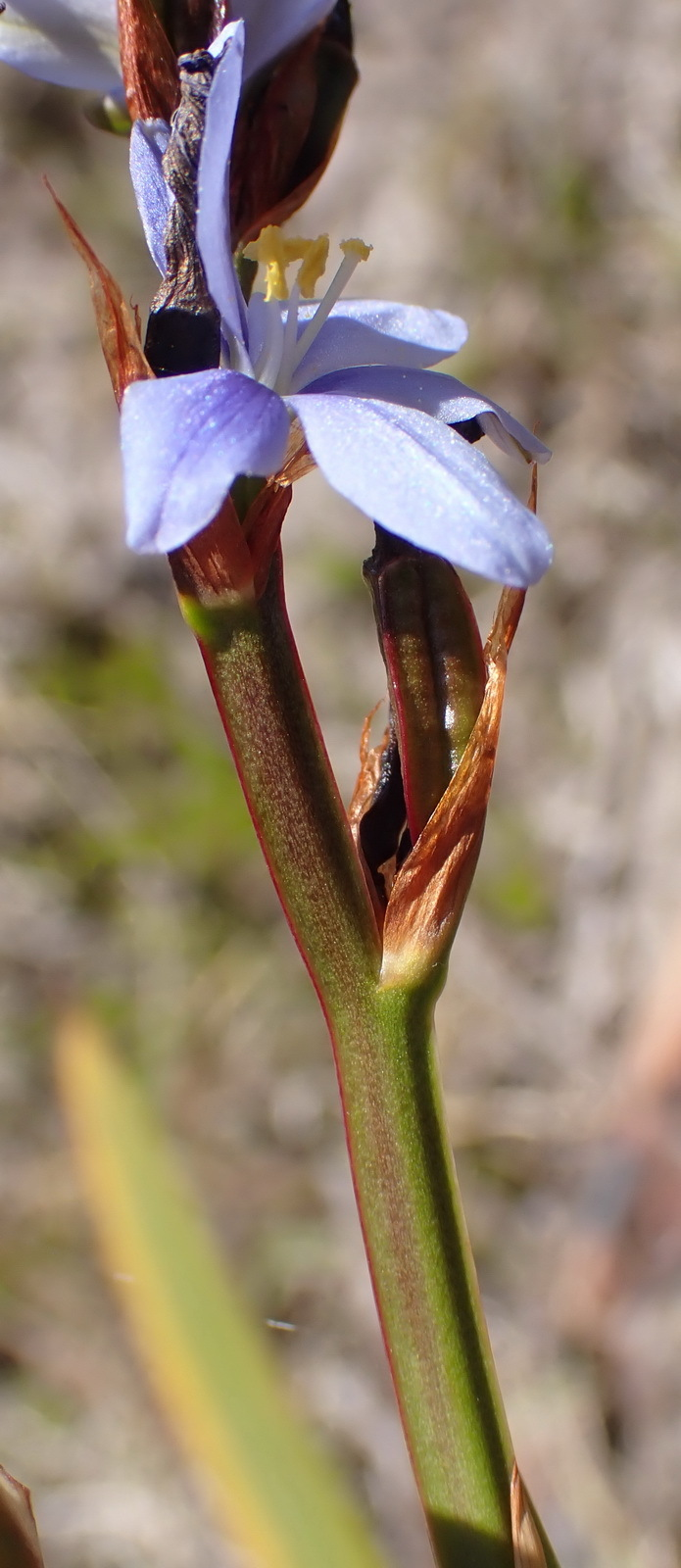
Aristea ecklonii

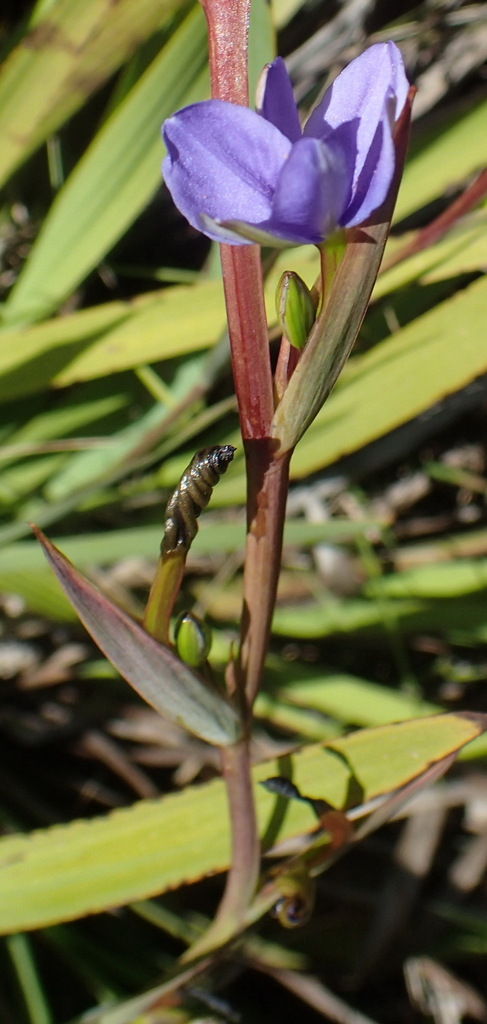
Aristea ensifolia

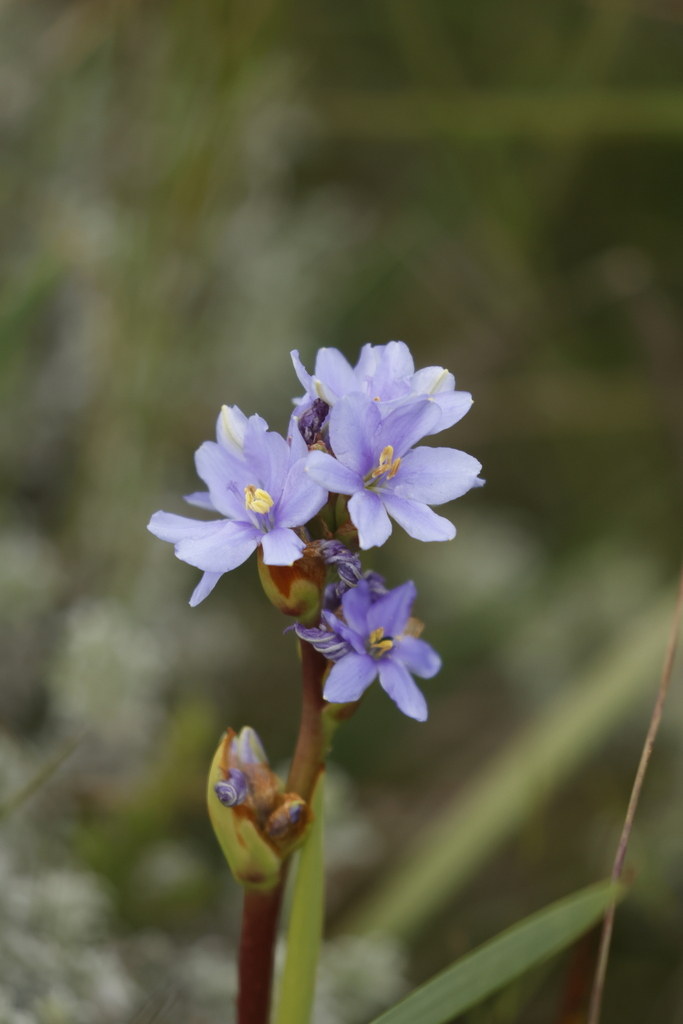
Aristea galpinii

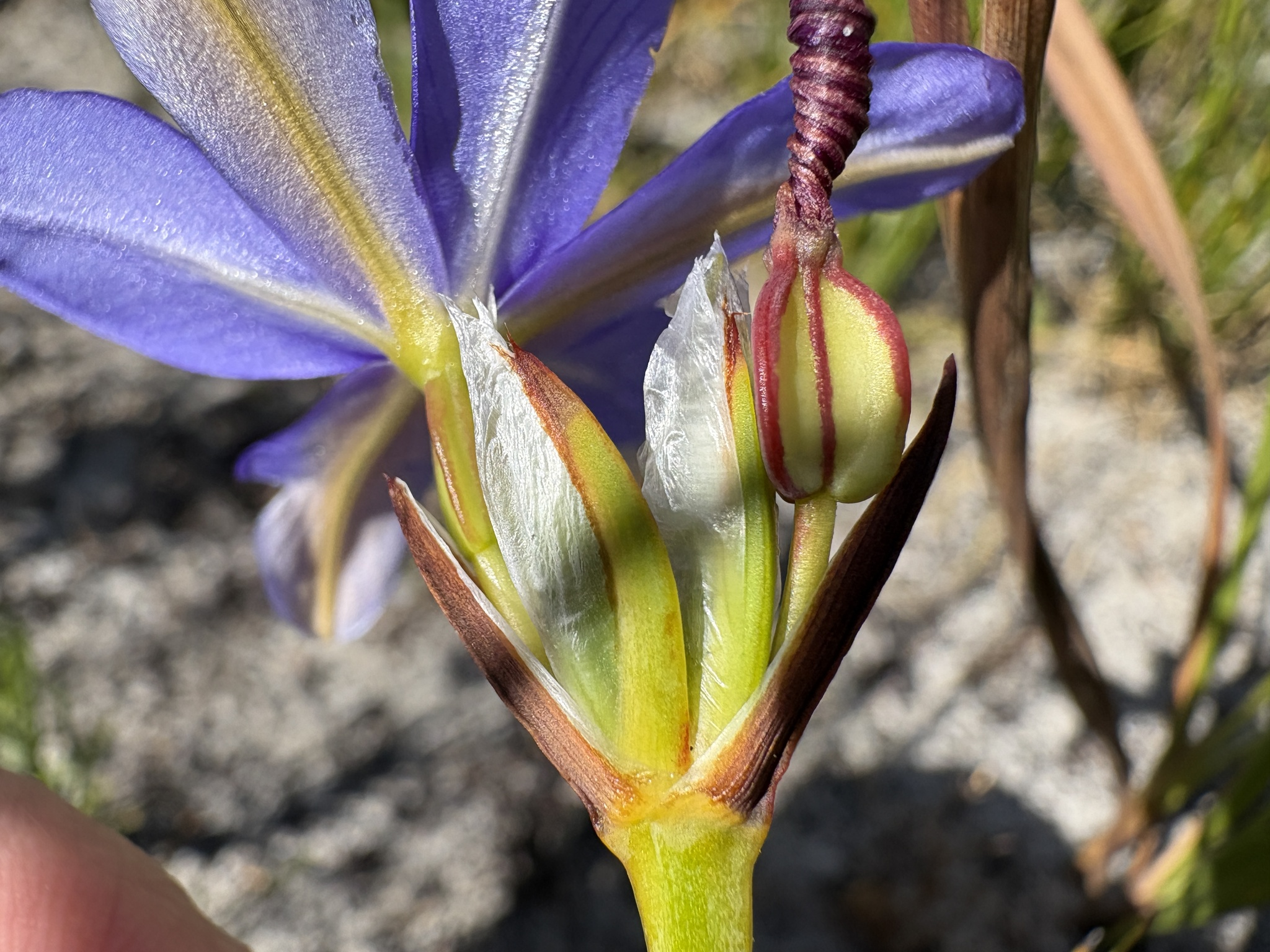
Aristea glauca

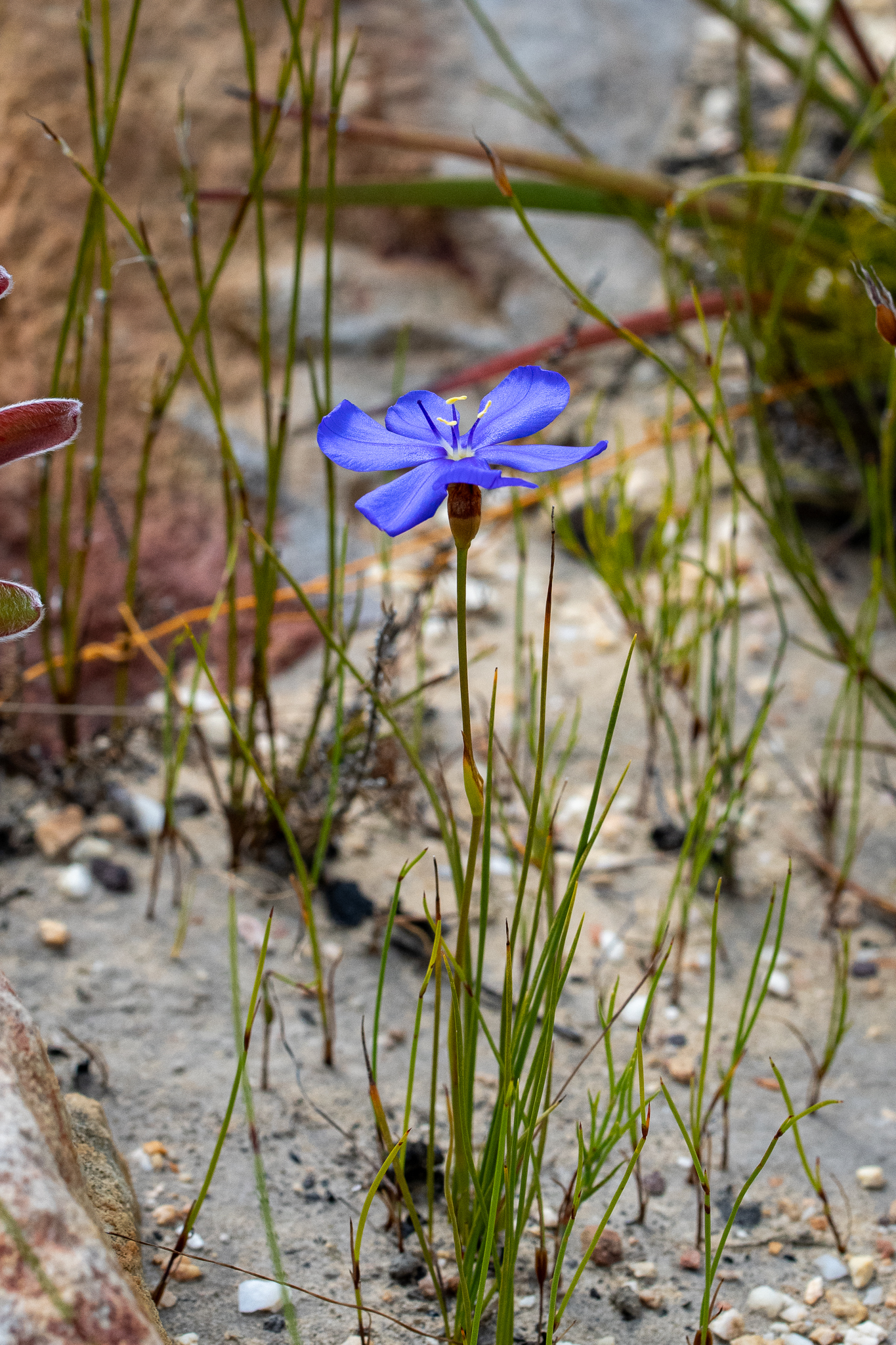
Aristea juncifolia

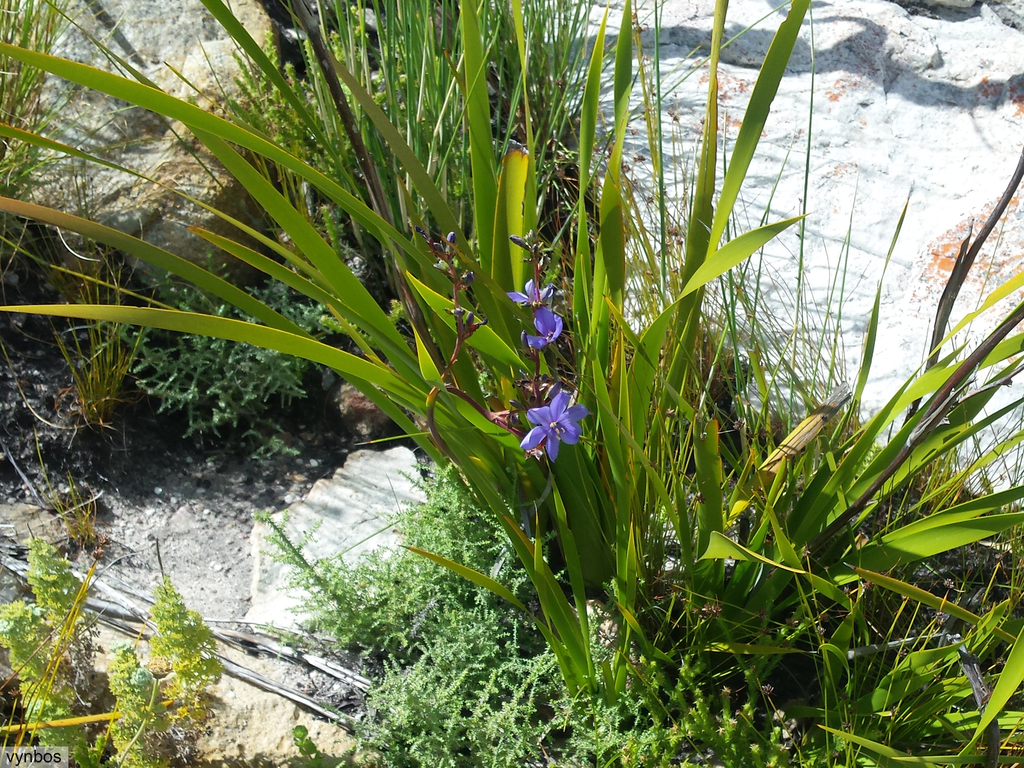
Aristea latifolia

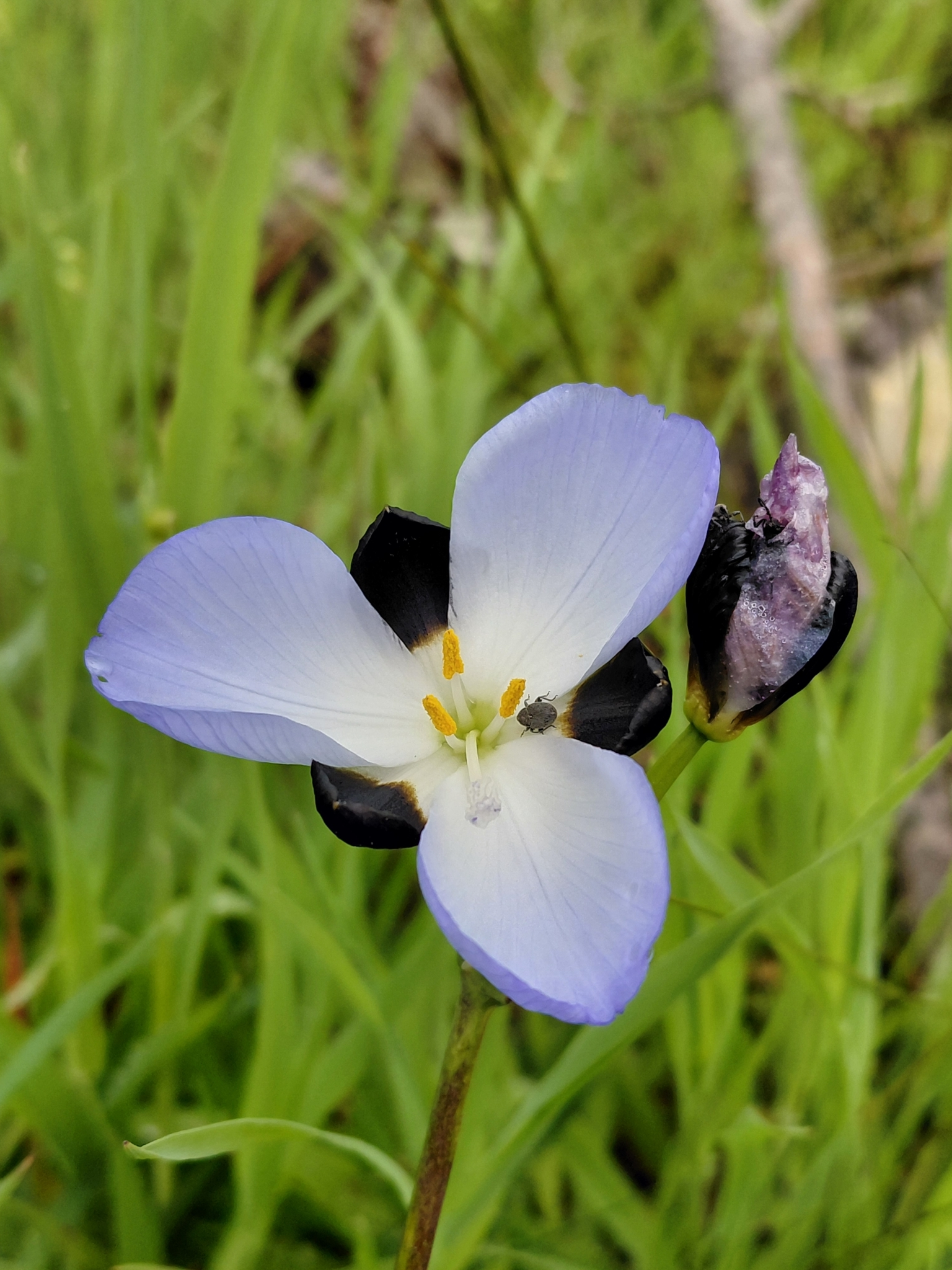
Aristea lugens

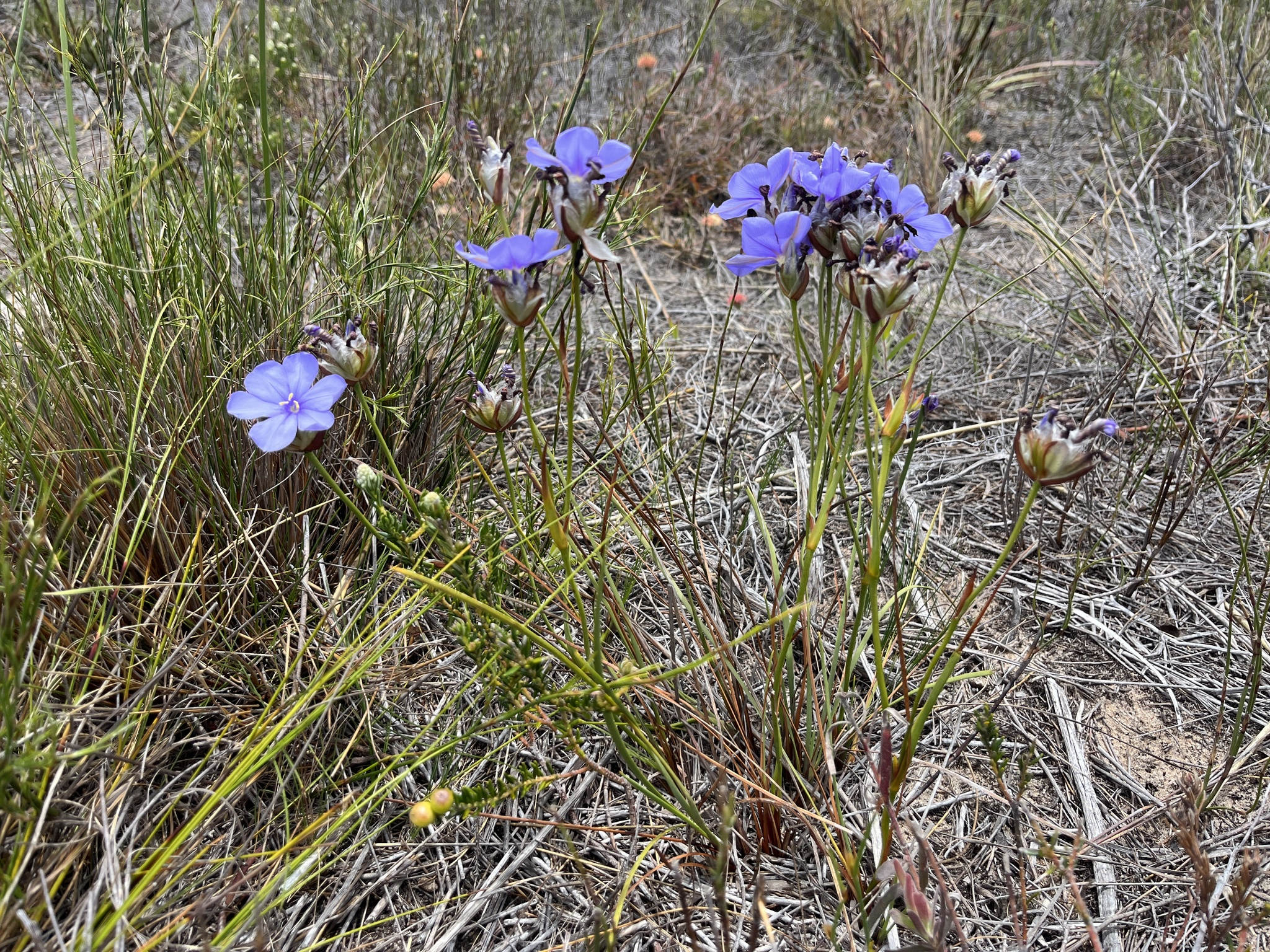
Aristea oligocephala

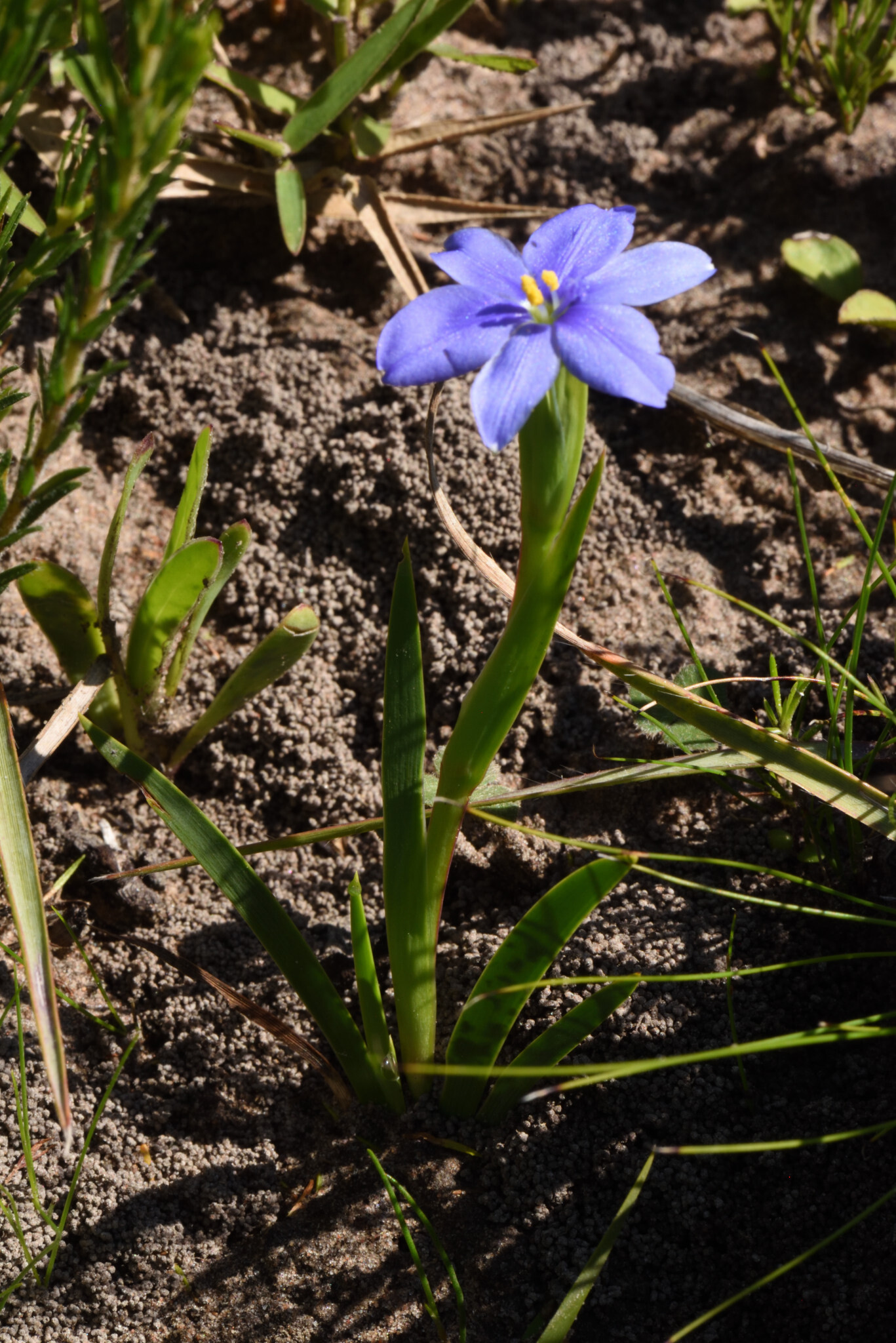
Aristea pusilla

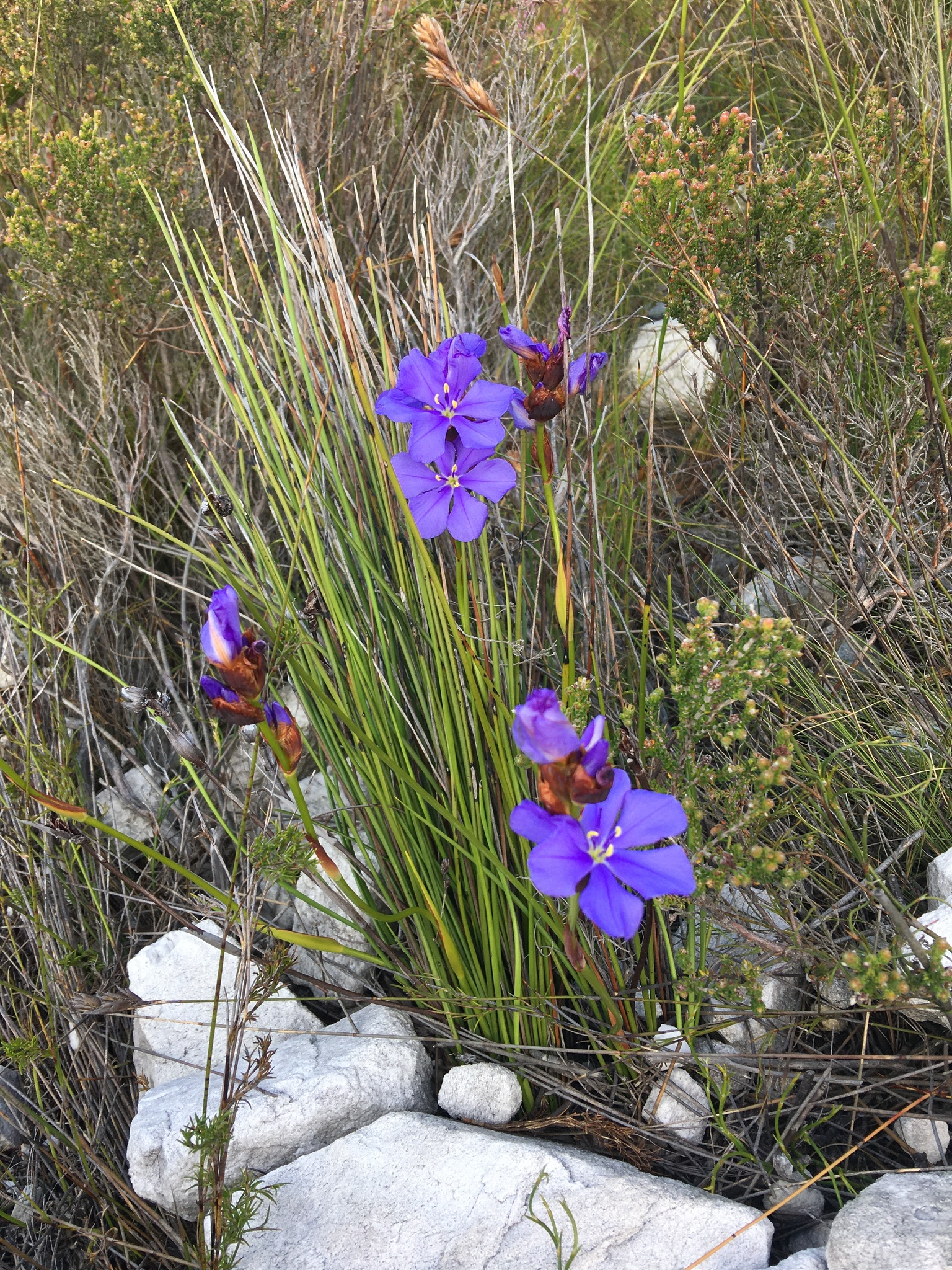
Aristea racemosa

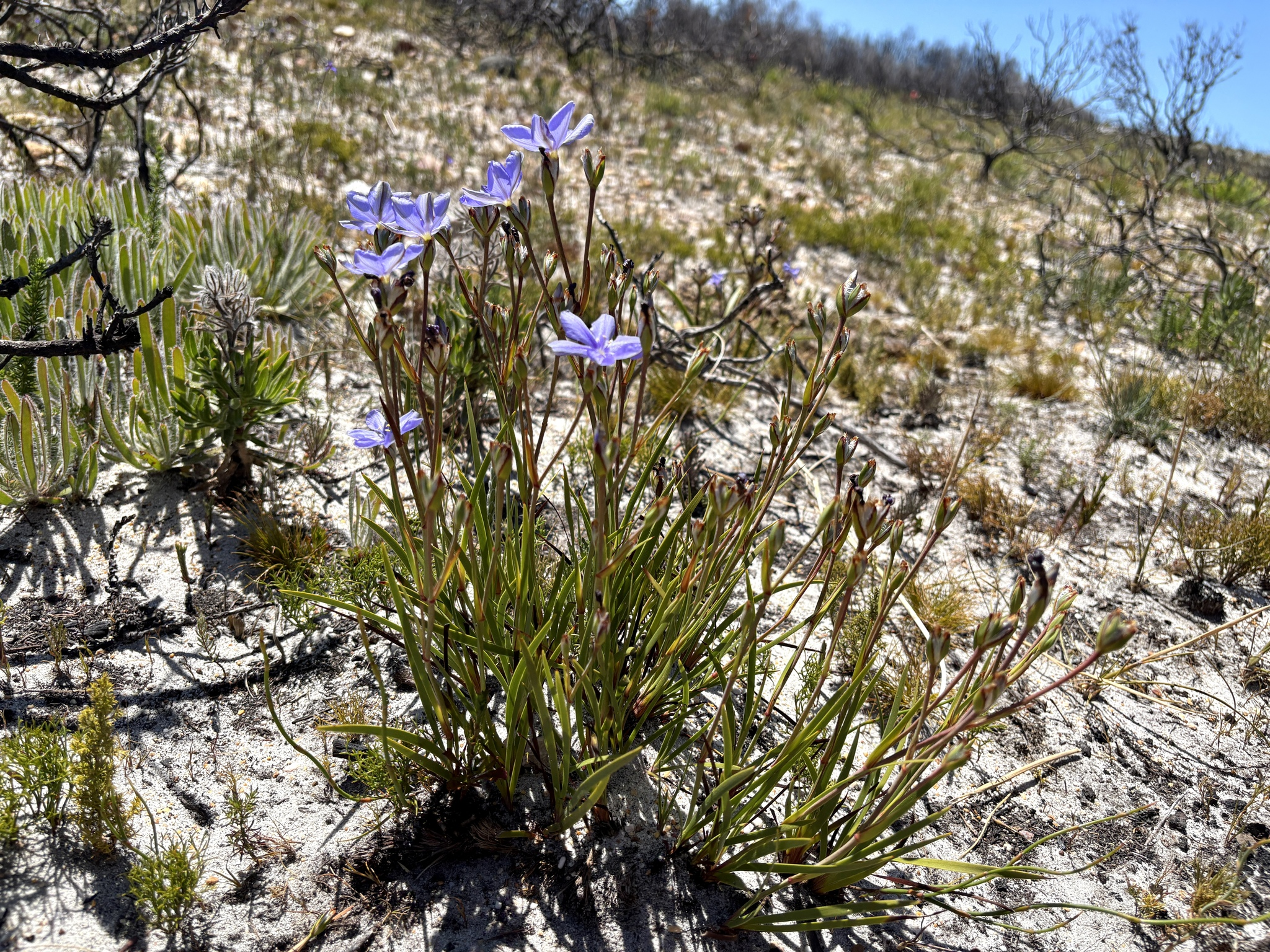
Aristea recisa

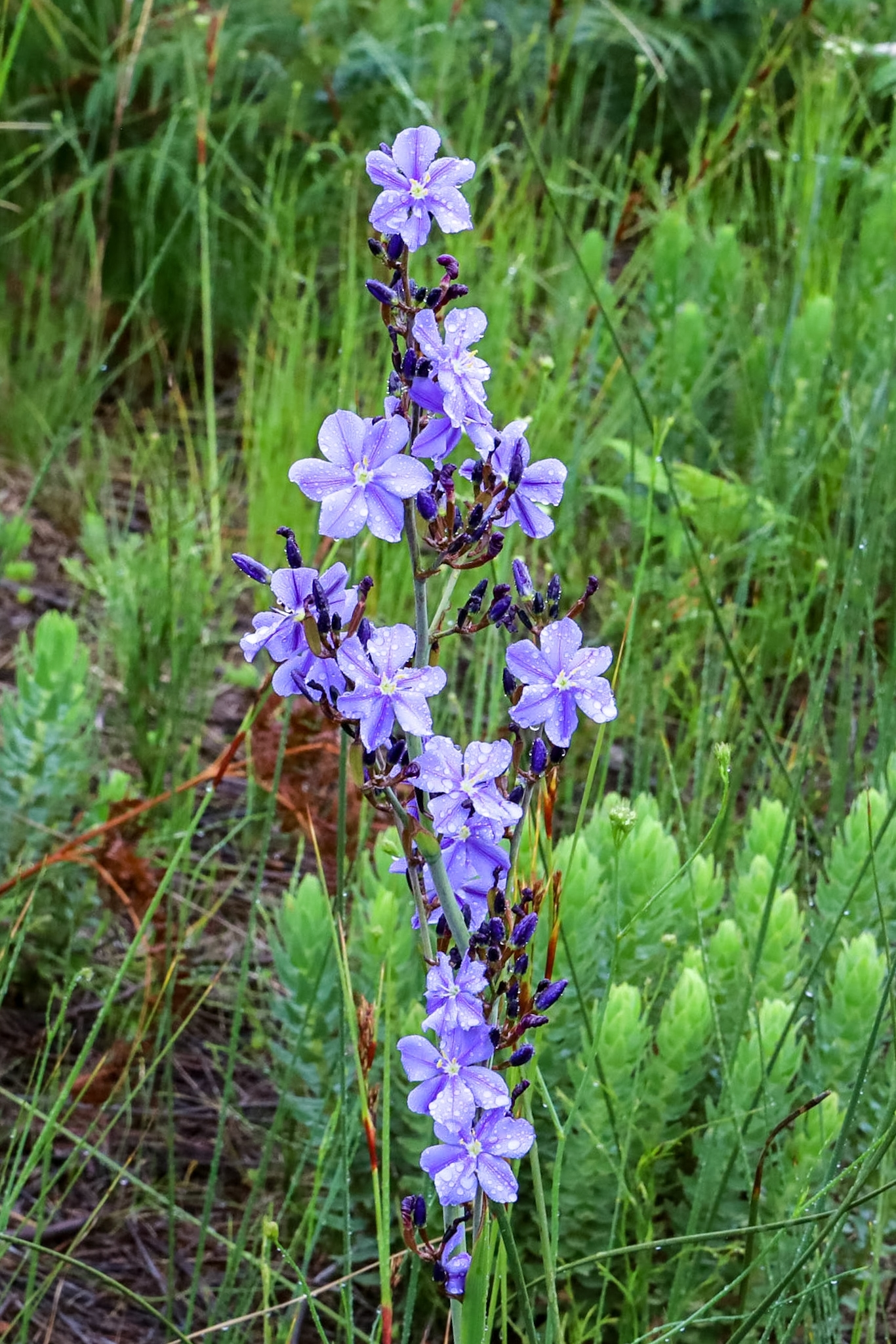
Aristea rigidifolia

== Distribution, ecology and conservation ==
In 2026 fifty-eight species are recognised, all of which are native in Africa. Eleven species can be found in tropical Africa: Aristea abyssinica (Burundi, Cameroon, Democratic Republic Congo, Ethiopia, Kenya, Malawi, Nigeria, Rwanda, South Africa, Tanzania, Uganda, Zambia, and Zimbabwe), A. alata (Ethiopia, Kenya, Tanzania, and Uganda), A. angolensis (Angola, Burundi, Democratic Republic Congo, Ethiopia, Kenya, Malawi, Nigeria, Tanzania, Uganda, Zambia, and Zimbabwe), A. bequaertii (southern Shaba region, RDC), A. compressa (tropical East Africa and Mozambique), A. djalonis (Guinea, Nigeria, and Sierra Leone), A. ecklonii (South Africa northwards to Cameroon, Malawi, and Tanzania), A. goetzei (Tanzania and Madagascar), A. nyikensis (Democratic Republic Congo, Malawi, Tanzania, and Zambia), A. polycephala (Malawi, Mozambique, and Tanzania), A. torulosa (South Africa, Angola, Malawi, Mozambique, Tanzania, Zambia, and Zimbabwe). The genus Aristea is represented on Madagascar by eight species, six of them endemic (Aristea angustifolia, A. cladocarpa, A. farafangana, A. humbertii, A. kitchingii, A. madagascariensis and A. ranomafana). Two others also occur on the African mainland. Of the species endemic to Madagascar, the continued survival of A. cladocarpa is considered to be of least concern, A. kitchingii is regarded as non-threatened, while A. angustifolia is listed as vulnerable. Aristea ecklonii is an invasive and naturalized weed in New South Wales, Queensland and Victoria and in New Zealand, where it threatens native undergrowth and rainforest regeneration. It has also been introduced to California, Jamaica, France, Great Britain, India including the western Himalayas and Tasmania.

Blousuurkanol species have star-symmetrical, mostly blue flowers that are mostly open for one morning only, do not produce nectar, have no smell and are pollinated by female bees that collect the pollen. The species in the subgenus Pseudoaristea (Aristea biflora, A. cantharophila, A. lugens, A. nigrescens, A. pauciflora, A. simplex, A. spiralis and A. teretifolia) however have flowers that are blue, white or pink, mostly with dark spots or the outer tepals are entirely brown to black. These flowers attract monkey beetles that also mate there. Aristea simplex is unique in producting nectar and is visited by flies with a long proboscis.

Many species, especially those that occur in the fynbos of South Africa, tolerate surface fires at the locations where they grow, partly because the corms from which new growth occurs are safely underground. They profit from summer fires since these remove much of the surrounding vegetation and so increase the availability of light, water and nutrients. Chemicals from charred plant material (including ethylene) and increased temperature differences between night and day trigger abundant post-fire flowering and germination. In some species such as Aristea bakeri and Aristea biflora plants flower almost exclusively in the first one or two years after the burning of the woody vegetation. Not all species however react the same way. Large species, like Aristea capitata, that grow in deep, moist and humus-rich soils flower annually regardless of the occurrence of fires, while shorter species adapted to drier soils that are quickly overtaken by high, dense shrubbery remain dormant until after it is destroyed by fire. Individual flowers in most species only last a single morning. They open early in the morning and close or wither by midday. The plants produce clusters of flowers that open sequentially over several weeks. This promotes reproductive success despite the short lifespan of the individual flower.

Of the forty-eight taxa that can be found in South Africa, the continued survival of twenty-seven is considered to be of least concern (Aristea abyssinica, A. africana, A. anceps, A. angolensis subsp. acutivalvis, A. angolensis subsp. angolensis, A. angolensis subsp. pulchella, A. bakeri, A. bracteata, A. capitata, A. compressa, A. cuspidata, A. dichotoma, A. ecklonii, A. ensifolia, A. galpinii, A. glauca, A. juncifolia, A. latifolia, A. montana, A. nana, A. pusilla, A. racemosa var. inflata, A. racemosa var. racemosa, A. rufobracteata, A. schizolaena, A. spiralis and A. torulosa).

Two species are considered rare (Aristea rupicola and A. singularis).

Six are thought to be near-threatened (Aristea cantharophila, A. flexicaulis, A. inaequalis, A. oligocephala, A. recisa, A. simplex).

Five species are vulnerable (Aristea biflora, A. elliptica, A. fimbriata, A. platycaulis and A. zeyheri).

Six species are treated as endangered (Aristea lugens, A. nigrescens, A. palustris, A. pauciflora, A. rigidifolia and A. teretifolia).

Two species are regarded as being critically endangered (Aristea cistiflora and A. grandis).
