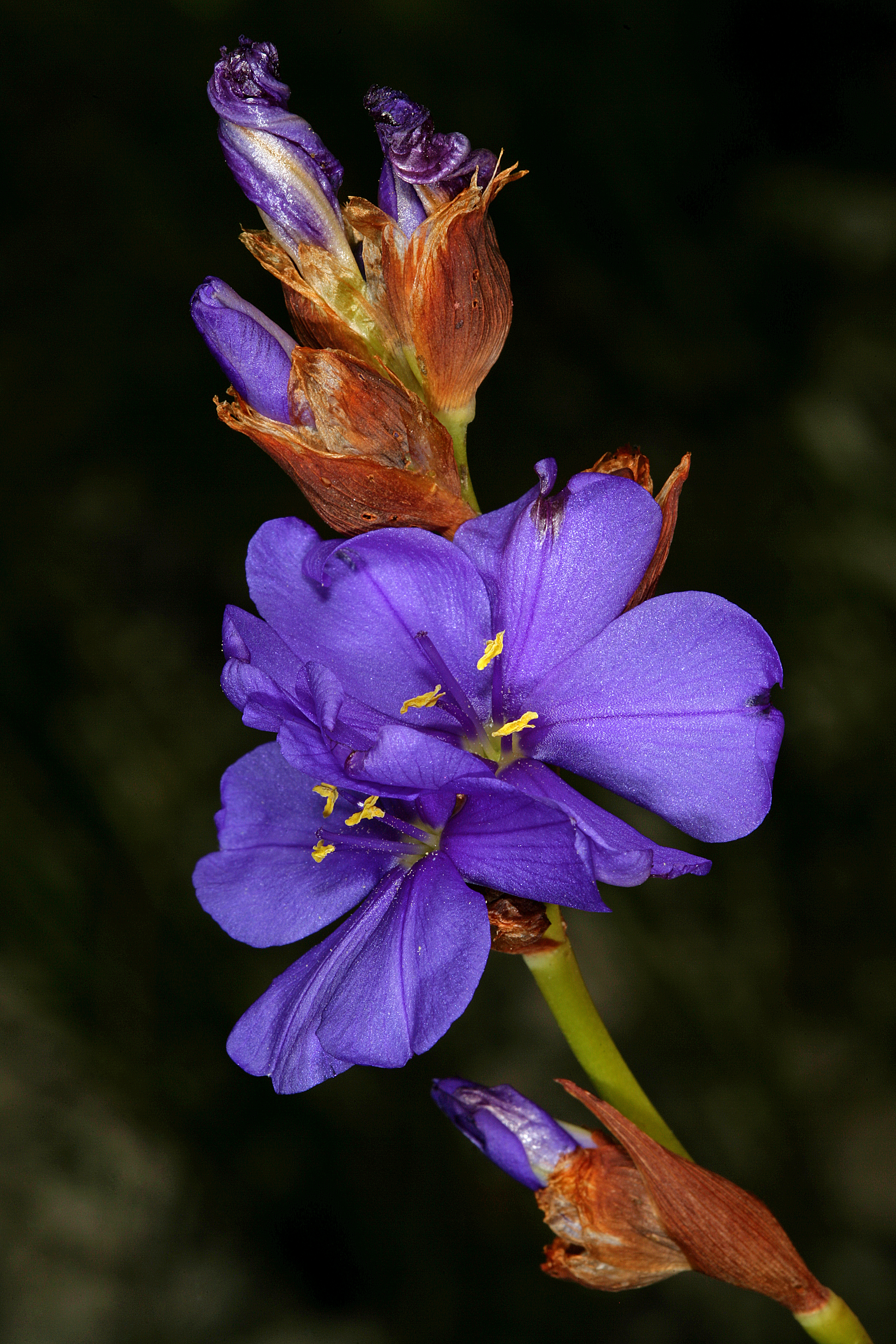

Scientific classification
- Kingdom: Plantae
- Clade: Embryophytes
- Clade: Tracheophytes
- Clade: Angiosperms
- Clade: Monocots
- Order: Asparagales
- Family: Iridaceae
- Genus: Aristea
- Species: A. juncifolia

Binomial name
- Aristea juncifolia Baker

= Aristea juncifolia =

Species of flowering plant

Aristea juncifolia, commonly known as the rush-leaf aristea or rush capeblue, is a cormous geophyte belonging to the genus Aristea and is part of the fynbos. The species is endemic to the Western Cape and occurs from the Cape Peninsula to the Kleinrivier Mountains near Stanford. The plant has an extent of occurrence of 3,132 km². It has lost 11% of its habitat to development but currently faces no threats.
