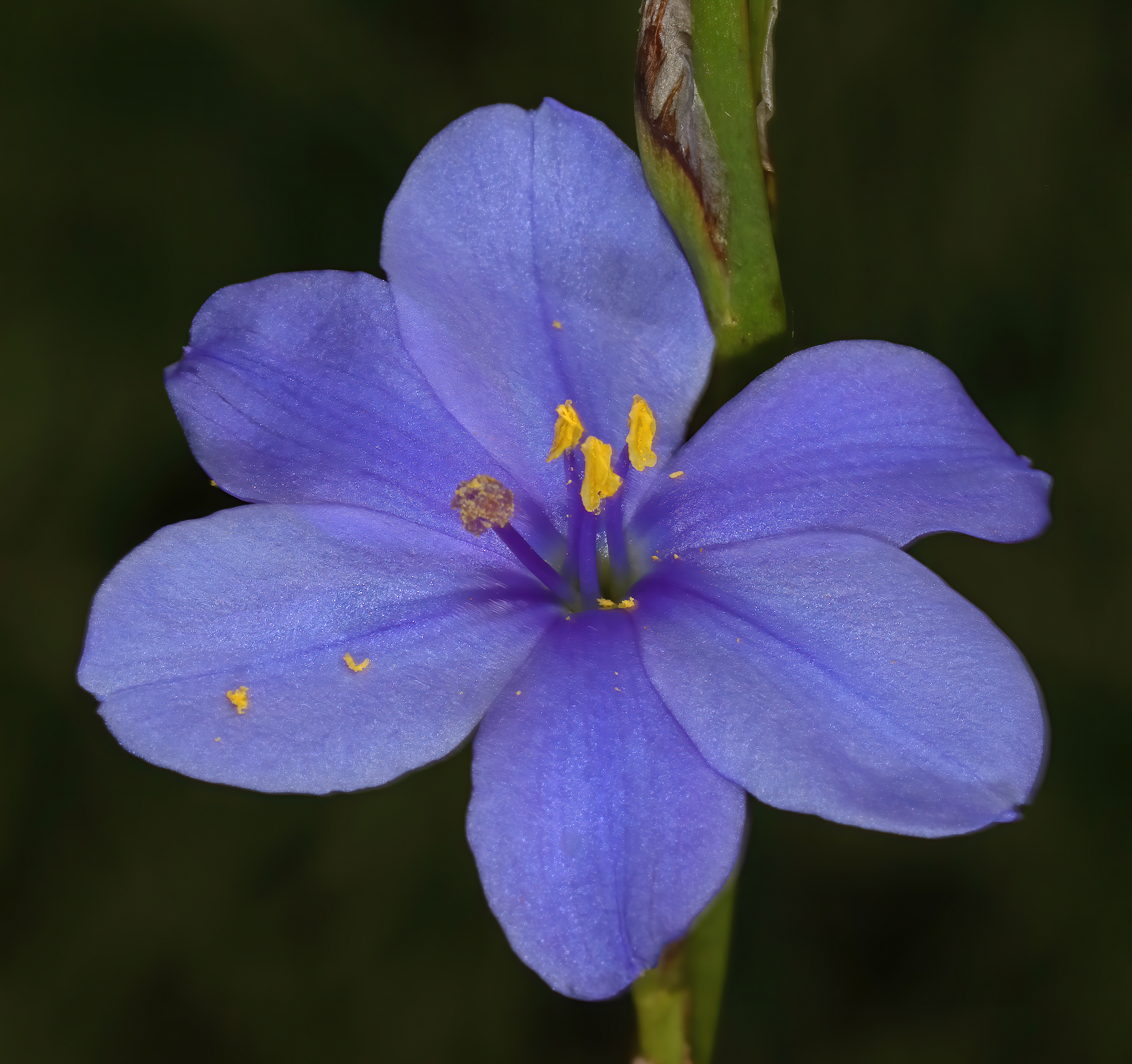

Scientific classification
- Kingdom: Plantae
- Clade: Embryophytes
- Clade: Tracheophytes
- Clade: Angiosperms
- Clade: Monocots
- Order: Asparagales
- Family: Iridaceae
- Genus: Aristea
- Species: A. torulosa

Binomial name
- Aristea torulosa Klatt

Synonyms
- Aristea affinis N.E.Br.; Aristea congesta N.E.Br.; Aristea curvata N.E.Br.; Aristea gracilis N.E.Br.; Aristea lukwangulensis Marais; Aristea torulosa var. monostachya Baker; Aristea woodii N.E.Br.

= Aristea torulosa =

Species of flowering plant

Aristea torulosa, commonly known as the Wood’s aristea, is a cormous geophyte belonging to the genus Aristea. The species is native to Eswatini, Lesotho, Malawi, Mozambique, South Africa, Tanzania, Zambia, and Zimbabwe. In South Africa, the plant occurs in Gauteng, KwaZulu-Natal, Limpopo, Mpumalanga, the Eastern Cape, and the Free State. The plant has an extent of occurrence of 318,800 km².
