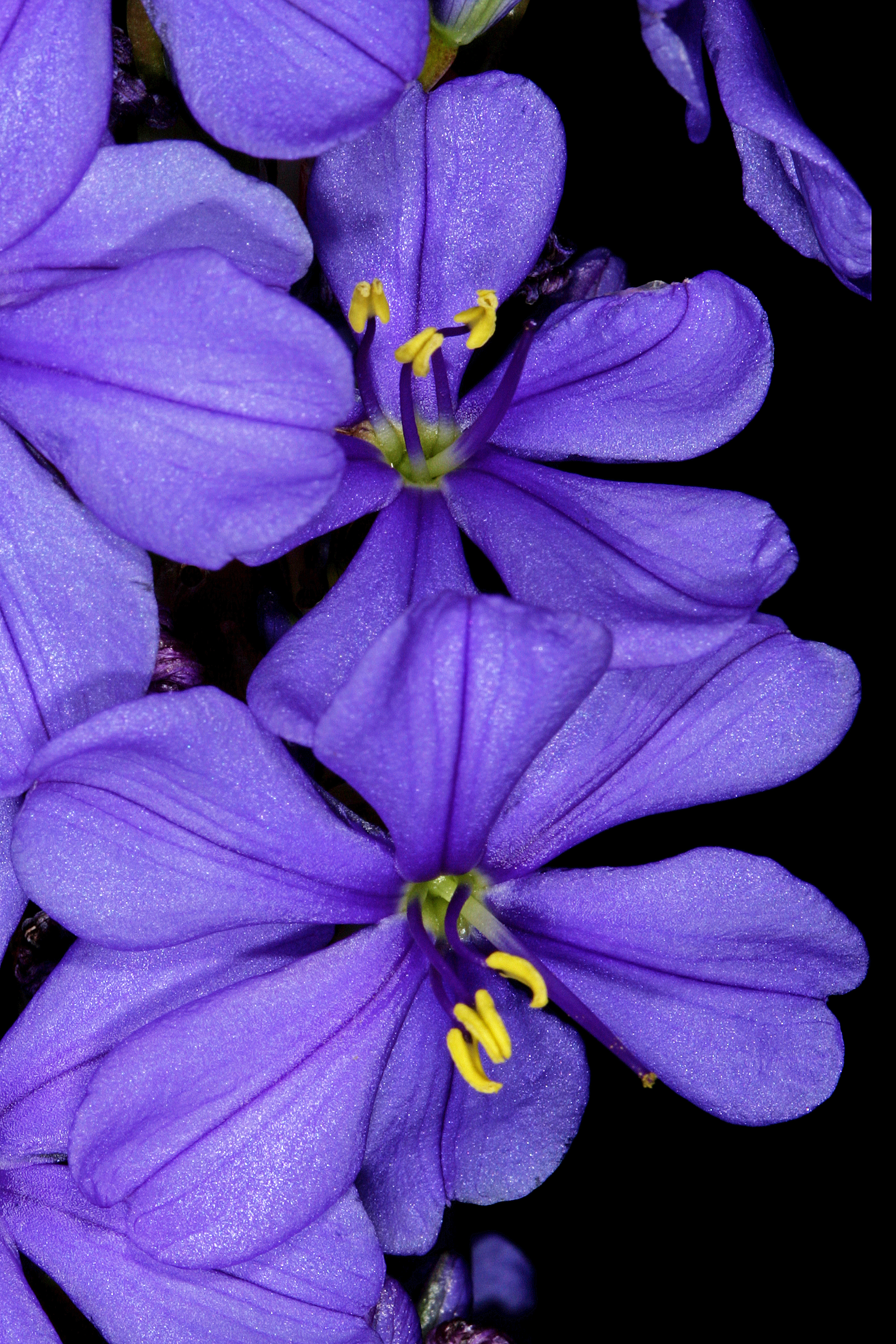

Scientific classification
- Kingdom: Plantae
- Clade: Embryophytes
- Clade: Tracheophytes
- Clade: Angiosperms
- Clade: Monocots
- Order: Asparagales
- Family: Iridaceae
- Genus: Aristea
- Species: A. capitata

Binomial name
- Aristea capitata (L.) Ker Gawl.

Synonyms
- Anomatheca capitata (L.) de Vriese; Aristea bracteata Pers.; Aristea caerulea Vahl; Gladiolus capitatus L.; Aristea major Andrews; Aristea spicata Pers.; Aristea thyrsiflora (D.Delaroche) N.E.Br.; Ixia thyrsiflora D.Delaroche; Moraea caerulea Thunb.

= Aristea capitata =

Species of flowering plant

Aristea capitata, commonly known as the blue sceptre or blouvuurpyl, is a cormous geophyte belonging to the genus Aristea. The species is endemic to the Western Cape and occurs from Piketberg and the upper reaches of the Olifants River Valley to the Kleinrivier and Riviersonderend Mountains. The plant has an extent of occurrence of 23,963 km² and is part of the fynbos.
