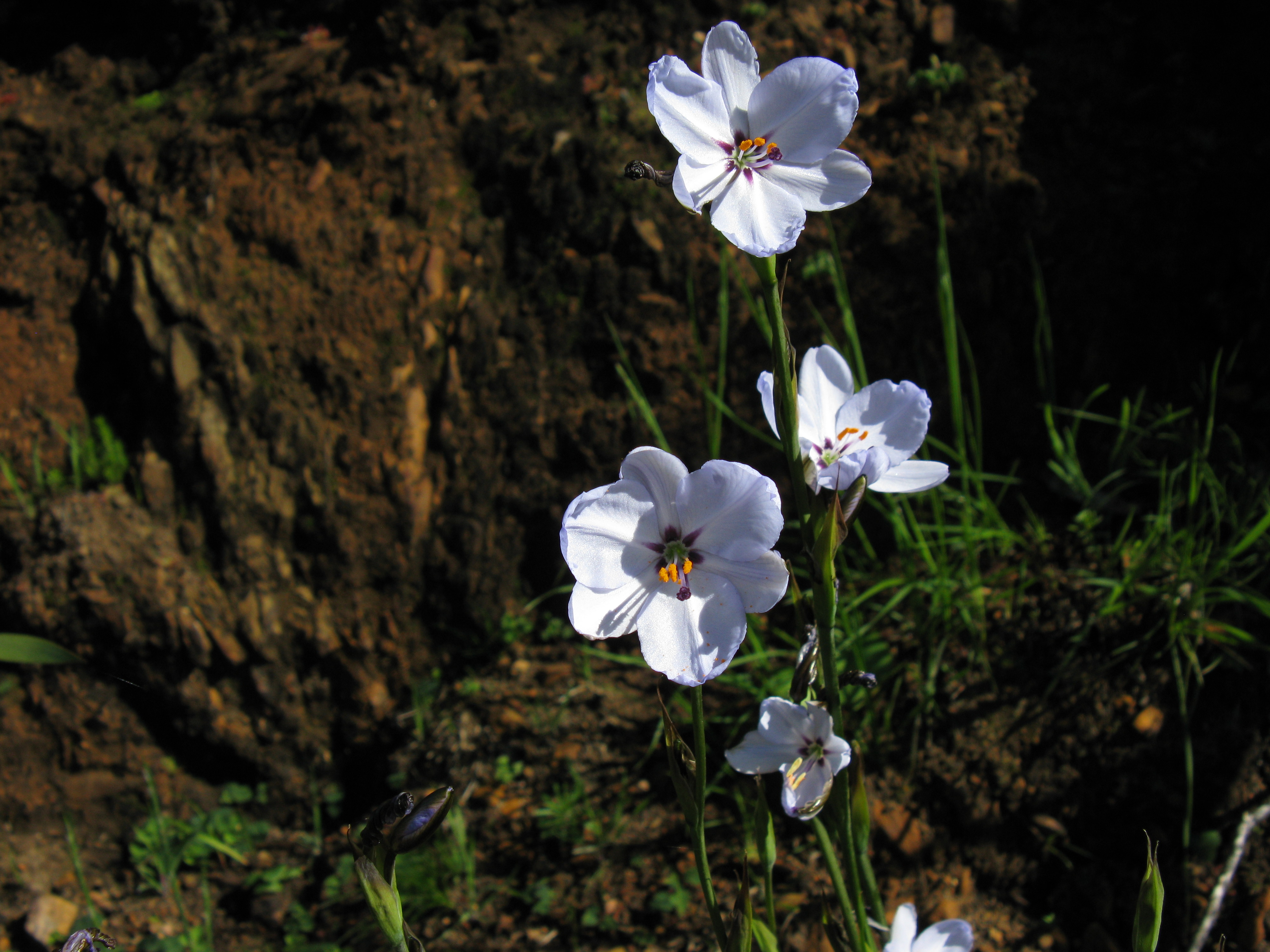

Scientific classification
- Kingdom: Plantae
- Clade: Embryophytes
- Clade: Tracheophytes
- Clade: Angiosperms
- Clade: Monocots
- Order: Asparagales
- Family: Iridaceae
- Genus: Aristea
- Species: A. spiralis

Binomial name
- Aristea spiralis (L.f.) Ker Gawl.

Synonyms
- Moraea spiralis L.f.; Sisyrinchium spirale (L.f.) Eckl.

= Aristea spiralis =

Species of flowering plant

Aristea spiralis, commonly known as the star-eyed aristea or pale Capeblue, is a cormous geophyte belonging to the genus Aristea. The species is endemic to the Western Cape. It occurs from the Cape Peninsula and Bainskloof to Knysna. The plant has an extent of occurrence of 53,277 km² and is part of the fynbos. It currently faces no threats.
