= Aristea biflora =

Scientific classification
- Kingdom: Plantae
- Clade: Embryophytes
- Clade: Tracheophytes
- Clade: Angiosperms
- Clade: Monocots
- Order: Asparagales
- Family: Iridaceae
- Genus: Aristea
- Species: A. biflora

Binomial name
- Aristea biflora Weim.

Species of flowering plant

Aristea biflora, commonly known as the windowed aristea or two-flowered aristea and maagbossie in Afrikaans, is a cormous geophyte belonging to the genus Aristea and is part of the fynbos. The species is endemic to the Western Cape and occurs from Caledon to Drayton. The plant has an extent of occurrence of 23–77 km² and has already lost 70% of its habitat to wheat cultivation. The remaining population is threatened by invasive plants, suburban development, and poor fire management.
