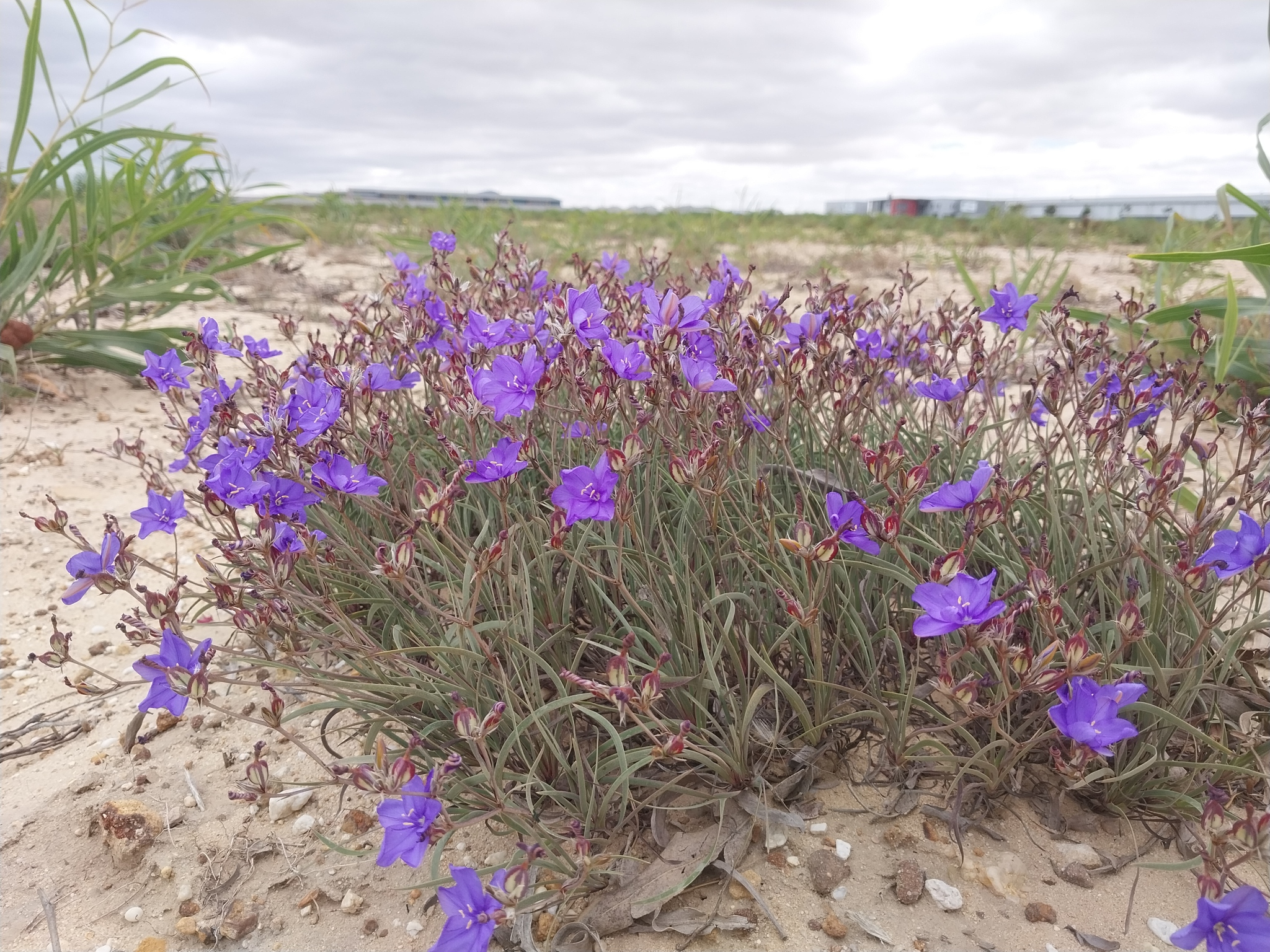

Scientific classification
- Kingdom: Plantae
- Clade: Tracheophytes
- Clade: Angiosperms
- Clade: Monocots
- Order: Asparagales
- Family: Iridaceae
- Genus: Aristea
- Species: A. dichotoma

Binomial name
- Aristea dichotoma (Thunb.) Ker Gawl.

Synonyms
- Aristea intermedia Eckl.; Moraea dichotoma Thunb.

= Aristea dichotoma =

Species of flowering plant

Aristea dichotoma, commonly known in Afrikaans as venstervrug or windowfruit capeblue in English, is a cormous geophyte belonging to the genus Aristea. The species is endemic to the Northern Cape and the Western Cape, occurring from Port Nolloth to the Cape Peninsula and Swellendam. The plant has an extent of occurrence of 85,923 km² and is part of the fynbos.
