= Aristea cantharophila =

Scientific classification
- Kingdom: Plantae
- Clade: Tracheophytes
- Clade: Angiosperms
- Clade: Monocots
- Order: Asparagales
- Family: Iridaceae
- Genus: Aristea
- Species: A. cantharophila

Binomial name
- Aristea cantharophila Goldblatt & J.C. Manning

Species of flowering plant

Aristea cantharophila is a plant species endemic to a small region of Western Cape Province, South Africa, Southeast of Cape Town. Type locality is in the Hottentots Holland Mountains near Sir Lowry's Pass. The species is facing serious threats and has been slated for conservation efforts.

Aristea cantharophila is a perennial herb up to 30 cm high, forming tussocks up to 12 cm in diameter. Leaves are mostly basal, very thin and sword-like, gladiolate (= folded so that one edge points toward the stem). Flowers are pale purple to white with a dark purple center.
