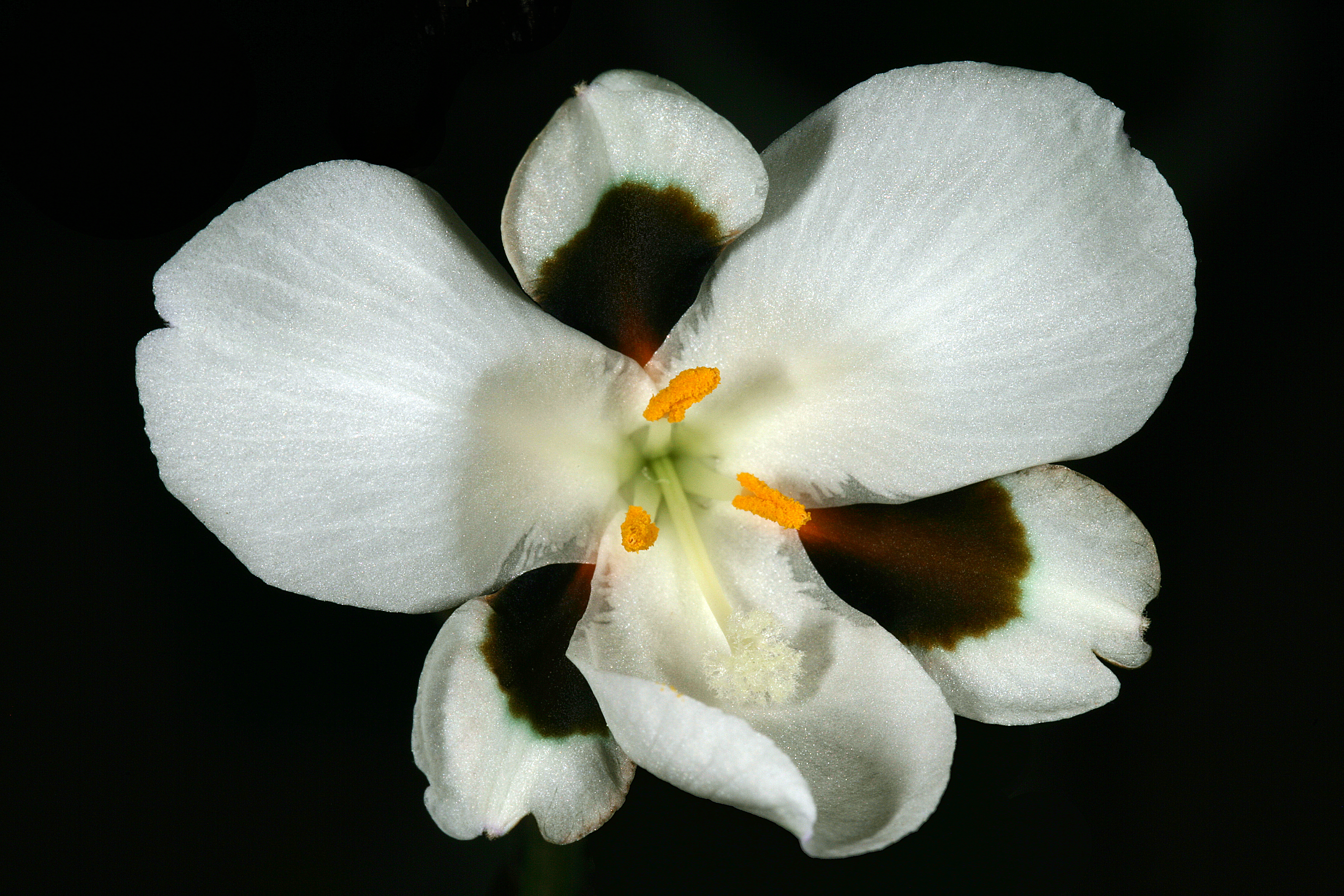

Scientific classification
- Kingdom: Plantae
- Clade: Embryophytes
- Clade: Tracheophytes
- Clade: Angiosperms
- Clade: Monocots
- Order: Asparagales
- Family: Iridaceae
- Genus: Aristea
- Species: A. teretifolia

Binomial name
- Aristea teretifolia Goldblatt & J.C.Manning, (1997)

= Aristea teretifolia =

Species of flowering plant

Aristea teretifolia is a cormous geophyte belonging to the genus Aristea and is part of the fynbos. The species is endemic to the Western Cape and occurs from Botrivier to Bredasdorp and Elim. The plant has an extent of occurrence of 890 km² and has already lost 70% of its habitat to crop cultivation, with losses continuing. In the Napier area, the species is threatened by invasive plants.
