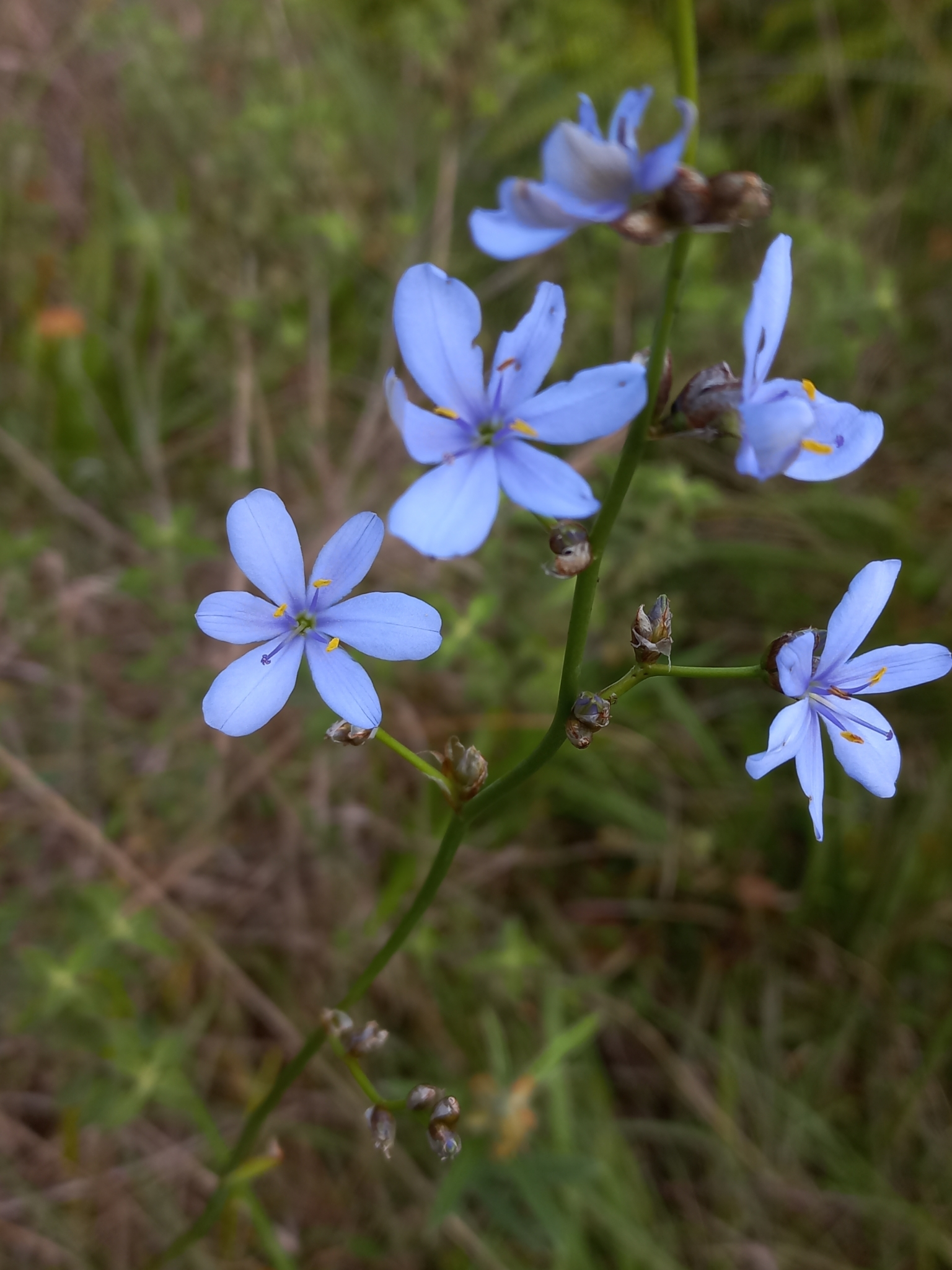

Scientific classification
- Kingdom: Plantae
- Clade: Tracheophytes
- Clade: Angiosperms
- Clade: Monocots
- Order: Asparagales
- Family: Iridaceae
- Genus: Aristea
- Species: A. compressa

Binomial name
- Aristea compressa Buchinger ex Baker

Synonyms
- Aristea gerrardii Weim.

= Aristea compressa =

Species of flowering plant

Aristea compressa, commonly known as blue brilliant, is a cormous geophyte belonging to the genus Aristea. The species is native to Eswatini, Mozambique, and South Africa. In South Africa, the species occurs in KwaZulu-Natal and the Eastern Cape. The plant has an extent of occurrence of 21,855 km².
