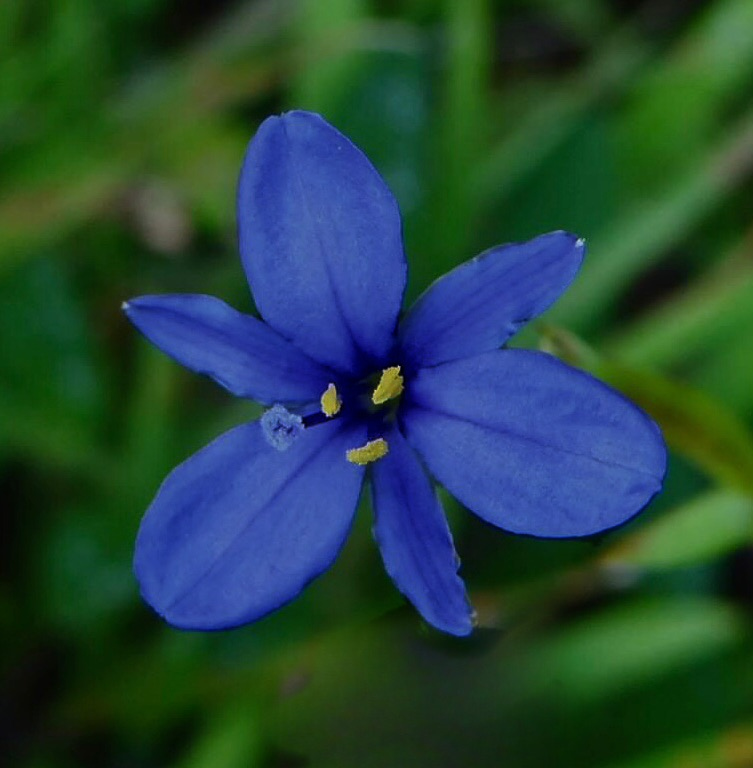

Scientific classification
- Kingdom: Plantae
- Clade: Embryophytes
- Clade: Tracheophytes
- Clade: Angiosperms
- Clade: Monocots
- Order: Asparagales
- Family: Iridaceae
- Genus: Aristea
- Species: A. abyssinica

Binomial name
- Aristea abyssinica Pax

Synonyms
- Aristea alata subsp. abyssinica (Pax) Weim.; Aristea cognata N.E.Br. ex Weim.; Aristea cognata subsp. abyssinica (Pax) Marais; Aristea johnstoniana Rendle; Aristea tayloriana Rendle

= Aristea abyssinica =

Species of flowering plant

Aristea abyssinica, commonly known as the blue-eyed grass, is a cormous geophyte belonging to the genus Aristea. The species is native to Burundi, the Democratic Republic of the Congo, Eswatini, Ethiopia, Cameroon, Kenya, Lesotho, Malawi, Nigeria, Rwanda, Sudan, South Africa, South Sudan, Tanzania, Uganda, Zambia, and Zimbabwe. In South Africa, the plant occurs in Gauteng, the Eastern Cape, KwaZulu-Natal, Limpopo, Mpumalanga, and the Free State.
