= Aristea singularis =

Scientific classification
- Kingdom: Plantae
- Clade: Tracheophytes
- Clade: Angiosperms
- Clade: Monocots
- Order: Asparagales
- Family: Iridaceae
- Genus: Aristea
- Species: A. singularis

Binomial name
- Aristea singularis Weim.

Species of flowering plant

Aristea singularis is a cormous geophyte belonging to the genus Aristea and is part of the fynbos. The species is endemic to the Western Cape and occurs in the northern part of the Cederberg and Pakhuis Mountains. The plant has an extent of occurrence of 52 km² and is considered rare.
