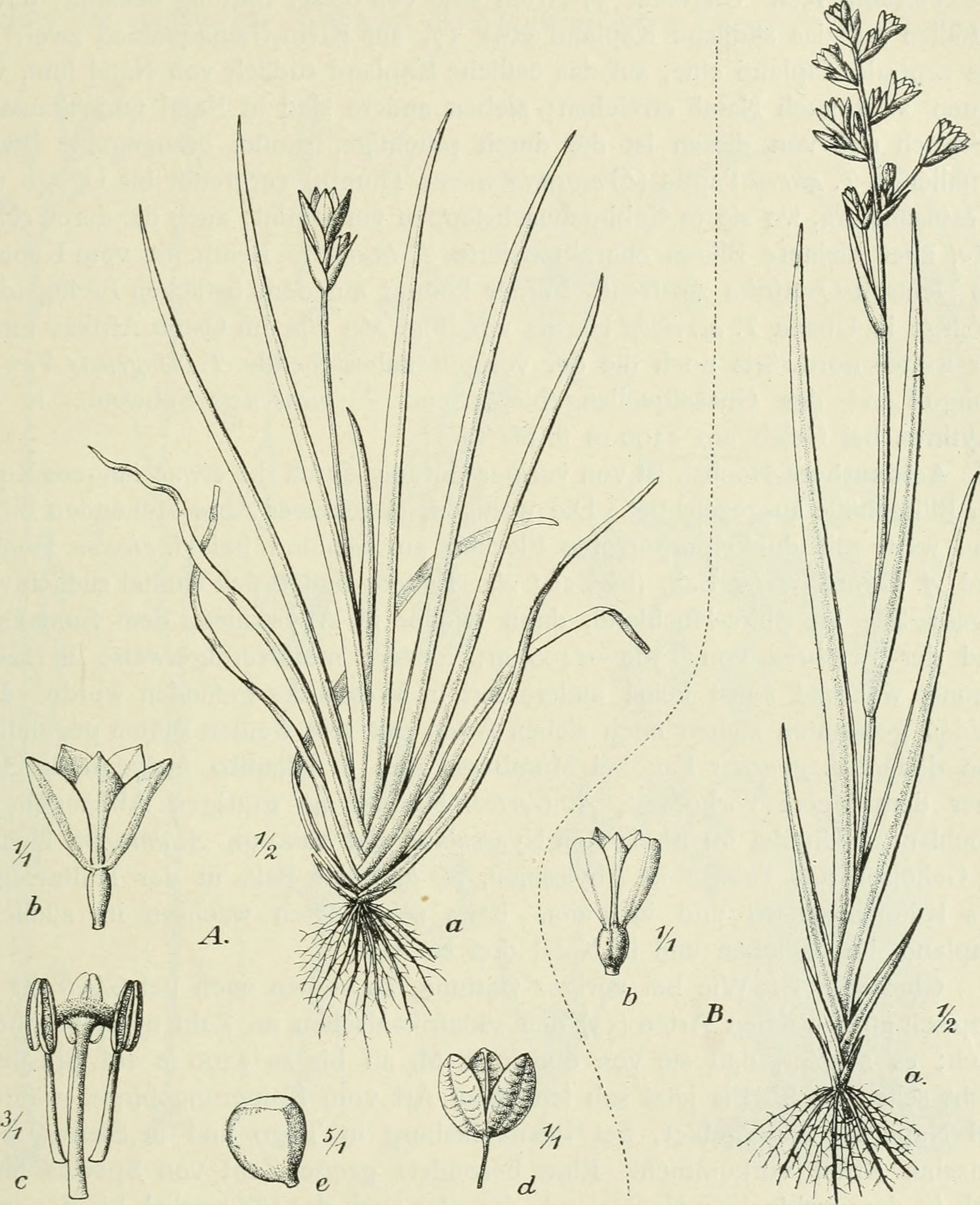

Scientific classification
- Kingdom: Plantae
- Clade: Tracheophytes
- Clade: Angiosperms
- Clade: Monocots
- Order: Asparagales
- Family: Iridaceae
- Genus: Aristea
- Species: A. nyikensis

Binomial name
- Aristea nyikensis Baker

Synonyms
- Aristea hockii De Wild.; Aristea uhehensis Harms ex Engl.

= Aristea nyikensis =

Species of flowering plant

Aristea nyikensis is a cormous geophyte belonging to the genus Aristea. The species is native to the Democratic Republic of the Congo, Malawi, Tanzania, and Zambia.
