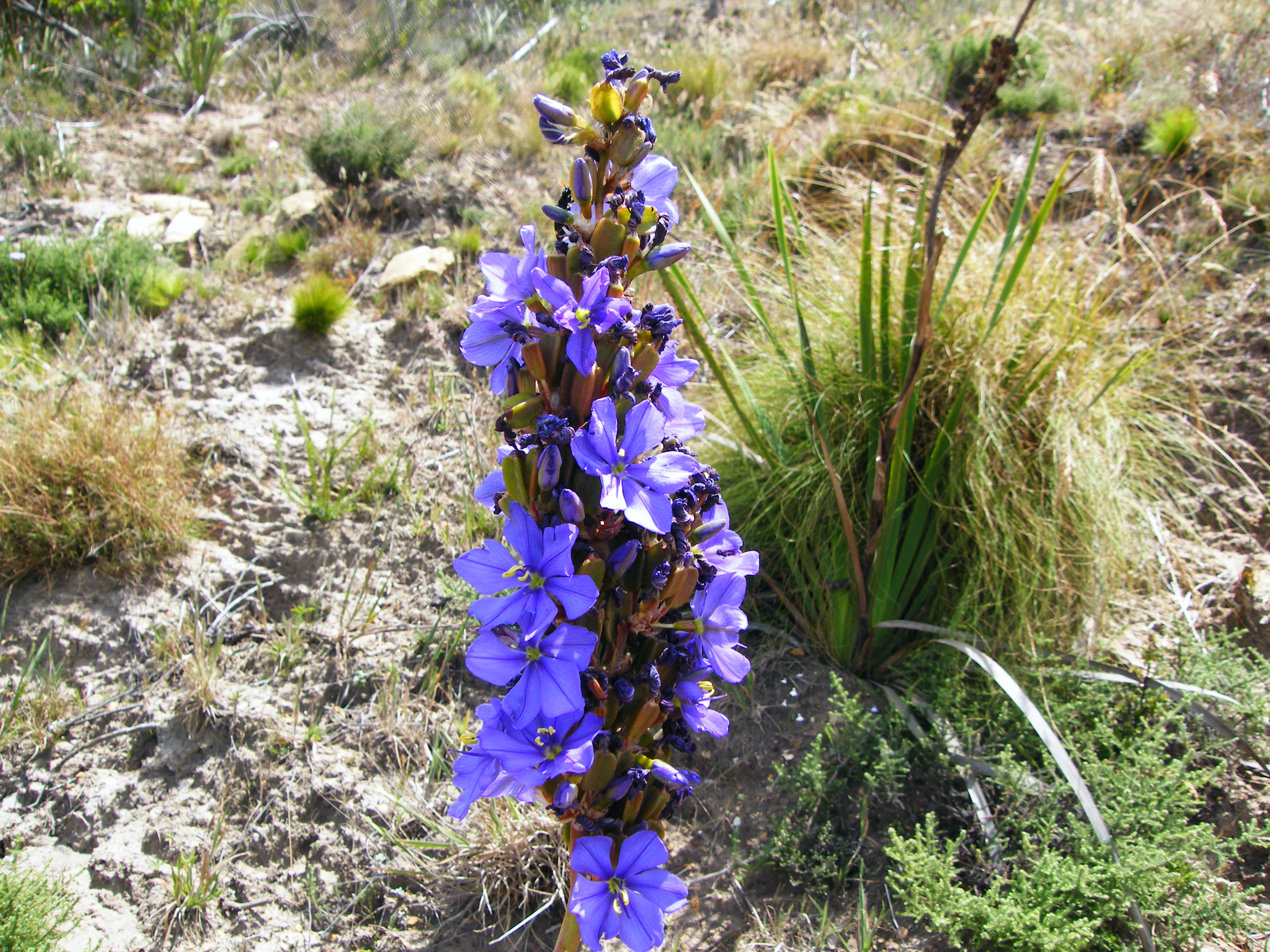

Scientific classification
- Kingdom: Plantae
- Clade: Tracheophytes
- Clade: Angiosperms
- Clade: Monocots
- Order: Asparagales
- Family: Iridaceae
- Genus: Aristea
- Species: A. bakeri

Binomial name
- Aristea bakeri Klatt

= Aristea bakeri =

Species of flowering plant

Aristea bakeri is a plant species in the family Iridaceae.
