= Aristea inaequalis =

Scientific classification
- Kingdom: Plantae
- Clade: Tracheophytes
- Clade: Angiosperms
- Clade: Monocots
- Order: Asparagales
- Family: Iridaceae
- Genus: Aristea
- Species: A. inaequalis

Binomial name
- Aristea inaequalis Goldblatt & J.C.Manning

Species of flowering plant

Aristea inaequalis is a cormous geophyte belonging to the genus Aristea and is part of the fynbos. The species is endemic to the Northern Cape and Western Cape, occurring from the Bokkeveld Mountains southwards to Pakhuis Pass in the northern Cederberg. The plant has an extent of occurrence of 3,311 km² and is threatened by potential sand mining.
