= Prosoeca peringueyi =

Scientific classification
- Kingdom: Animalia
- Phylum: Arthropoda
- Clade: Pancrustacea
- Class: Insecta
- Order: Diptera
- Family: Nemestrinidae
- Genus: Prosoeca
- Species: P. peringueyi

Binomial name
- Prosoeca peringueyi Lichtwardt, 1920

Species of fly

Prosoeca peringueyi, or the longtongue tanglevein fly, is a species of tangle-veined flies in the family Nemestrinidae. It is a large insect of about 18 mm (0.71 in) long. It has a very long, rigid straw-like mouthpart, or proboscis, that is about 1½× as long as the length of its body. It has six dark brown legs, and a grey body with a detailed pattern along the middle of the thorax and the abdomen. Parallel to the midline there are two dark black stripes that reach a groove in the middle (the transverse suture). Like in all flies only the frontal pair of wings is used to provide lift and thrust, while the rear pair are small, club-shaped organs that act as gyroscopes, enabling precision flight. The front half of the wings has smoky-brown patterned shading. In specimens found further north (past the town of Calvinia), a specific vein connecting veins R4 and R2+3 is complete, but incomplete or lacking to the south.

== Description ==
The body is on average 18 mm (0.71 in) long (full spread 13–21 mm (0.51–0.83 in)). The distance between the bases of the forewings on average is 7 mm (0.28 in) (spread 5–8 mm (0.20–0.31 in). The proboscis in rest is 29 mm (1.1 in) (spread 23–35 mm (0.91–1.38 in). The wings are 19½ mm long (spread 18-21 mm).

=== Differences with related species ===
The six species of Prosoeca that occur along the west coast of South Africa and fly dirigent spring can be distinguished by their mouthparts, wings, and backs. Prosoeca peringueyi, P. marinusi, and P. torquata have a proboscis that is longer than their entire body and this is in contrast to P. ora, P. aquilo, and P. parva that feed through a tube that is shorter than their body. P. peringueyi and P. torquata both have dark, smoky-brown patterns on their wings that stand out sharply against the clear parts of the wing, while P. marinusi has a lighter brown pattern that blends in much more smoothly with the rest of its slightly tinted wings. P. peringueyi is the species with two dark black stripes on the sides of its upper abdomen, that also constrast sharply with the surrounding lighter gray hairs compared to the darker gray abdomen of P. torquata and P. marinusi. However, Prosoeca peringueyi lacks a white band of hairs on the front of the thorax that is prominent in P. torquata.

== Taxonomy ==
The longtongue tanglevein fly was first described by the German entomologist Bernhard Lichtwardt, who called it Prosoeca peringueyi. Initially specimens now assigned to P. torquata and P. marinusi were considered belonging to the same species as P. peringueyi, but now these are considered separate taxa. Insights in the relationship between the spring-flying, long-tongued Prosoeca from the Succulent Karroo on the South African west coast have increased based on comparison of homologic DNA. The following relationship tree is a depiction of those insights.

- Spring‑flying Prosoeca‑clade from the Succulent Karoo
  - - - - P. peringueyi
        - P. torquata
      - P. ora
    - - P. marinusi
      - P. parva
  - other Prosoeca-species

== Distribution, ecology and conservation ==
The longtongue tanglevein fly occurs in the Succulent Karoo of Namaqualand from Kuboes on the Namibian border in the north to Piekenierskloof pass in the south, but is absent from the Knersvlakte. The longtongue tanglevein fly was long thought to be the only species that pollinates a large number of species of the Iridaceae and Pelargonium, that all flower late winter and early spring. These species share light pink to intense purple or crimson flowers with extremely long and slender perianth tubes. Recently however, P. torquata and P. marinusi were distinguished. These two new species of longtongue tanglevein fly appear to pollinate many of the same plant species. These plant species include Lapeirousia silenoides, L. pyramidalis subsp. regalis, L. jacquinii, L. dolomitica subsp. dolomitica, L. violacea, L. anceps, Babiana framesii, B. curviscapa, B. dregei, B. ecklonii, B. flabellifolia, B. tubulosa, B. vanzijliae, Sparaxis metelerkampiae, Tritonia marlothii, Aristea spiralis, Gladiolus angustus, Ixia paniculata, Romulea hantamensis, Pelargonium magenteum, P. sericifolium, P. incrassatum, P. longicaule, P. stipulaceum, and P. crithmifolium.
