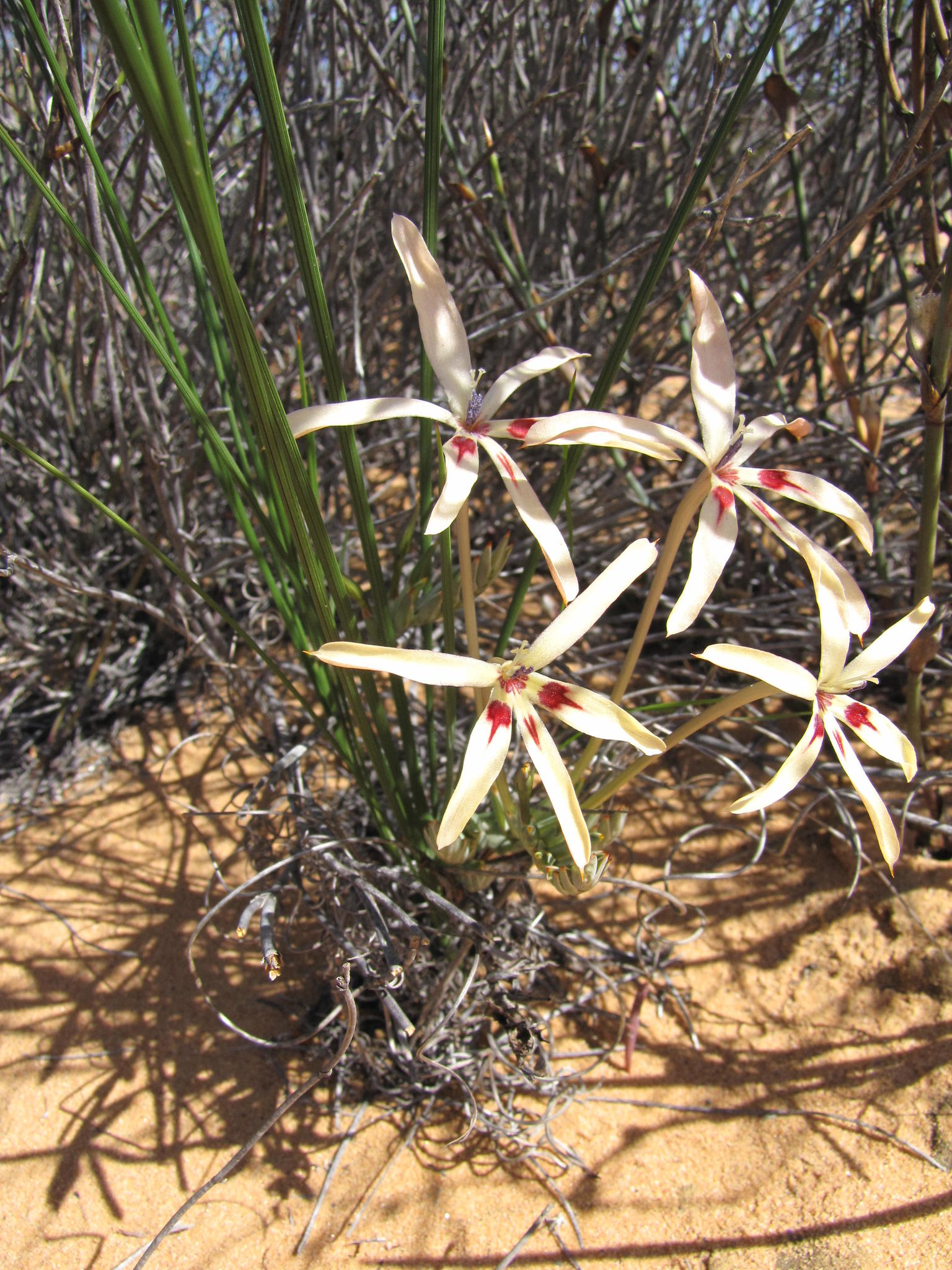

Scientific classification
- Kingdom: Plantae
- Clade: Tracheophytes
- Clade: Angiosperms
- Clade: Monocots
- Order: Asparagales
- Family: Iridaceae
- Genus: Babiana
- Species: B. brachystachys

Binomial name
- Babiana brachystachys (Baker) G.J.Lewis

Synonyms
- Acidanthera brachystachys Baker

= Babiana brachystachys =

Species of flowering plant

Babiana brachystachys is a species of geophyte of 20–30 cm (7.9–11.8 in) high that is assigned to the family Iridaceae. It has cream or pale pink, only slightly mirror-symmetrical flowers that are pink on the reverse with a long narrow tube that splits into six tepal lobes, three stamens, a style that divides in three branches opposite the tip of the anthers and line-shaped leaves that are circular in cross section. It is an endemic species of South Africa that can be found on sandy hills and inland dunes in the Northern Cape province. It flowers in September and October.

== Description ==
Babiana brachystachys is a geophyte with an underground corm from which annually the leaves and stems appear above ground, forming a plant of 20–30 cm (7.9–11.8 in) high. The lowest, reduced leaves or cataphylls are covered in cobweb-like hairs. The stem is mostly underground and rarely branches. Unique among Babiana species, it has leaf blades that are line-shaped, circular in cross section with several grooves along its length. These are hairless. The blade sits at an angle atop a sheath that envelops the sheaths of higher leaves. The sheath has two rows of hairs along its length and is cob-webby at its base. The scentless flowers sit with five to ten together in a horizontal spike, each subtended by two green, hairless bracts of 22–35 mm (0.87–1.38 in) long with tips becoming dry and brown. The upper third of the inner bract is split in two lobes. The perianth is pink on the outside and cream-colored or very pale pink on the inside. It is only weakly mirror-symmetrical, merged to a tube of 70–75 mm (2.8–3.0 in) long that is straight but slightly curves near where it splits into six narrow perianth lobes of 16–24 mm (0.63–0.94 in) long, that spread perpendicular to the tube. Each of the lower three lobes is adorned with a red mark in its basal half. Three stamens are crowded at the dorsal side of the flower and consist of a 4–5 mm (0.16–0.20 in) long filament implanted at the top of the perianth tube and carrying an anther of about 5 mm long. Below the perianth tube sits a hairless ovary from which emerges the style that fills the perianth tube and splits into three branches of about 2.5 mm (0.098 in) long opposite the tip of the anthers. This species flowers in September and October.

=== Differences with similar species ===
Babiana tubulosa also has pale flowers with a comparably long perianth tube. It can be distinguished by its more robust habit, wider and hairy, sword-shaped leaves of 8–12 mm (0.31–0.47 in) wide, cream-coloured flowers from mid-September to mid-October, that are flushed pink on the reverse, with a perianth tube with a distinct gullet, filaments of 20–22 mm (0.79–0.87 in) long and style branches of about 6 mm (0.24 in) long. B. tubiflora has leaves of 3-6 mm wide, flowers that usually flower until mid-September and are white or cream on the reverse, a perianth tube without a gullet, filaments of 13-16 mm and style branches 3-4 mm long. B. lapeirousioides only has two or three whitish flowers with red markings in a spike, about 7 mm long filaments and 4.5 mm long anthers, with hairless, rigid, pleated leaf blades with an almost spiny tip. B. brachystachys has cream-coloured flowers, pink on the reverse, with short filaments of 5-6 mm long and terete leaves.

== Taxonomy and naming ==
This species was first described by John Gilbert Baker in 1876, based on a collection made by P.A. Mader and Peter MacOwan from the North Cape. He called the species Acidanthera brachystachys. South African botanist Gwendoline Joyce Lewis published in 1959 an extensive revision of the genus Babiana. Therein she reassigned Baker's species and created the new combination Babiana brachystachys. It is the type species of the section Teretifoliae.

The species name brachystachys is the contraction of the Ancient Greek words βραχύς (brăkhŭ́s) meaning "short", and στάχυς (stắkhū̆s), meaning "an ear of grain", referring to the inflorescence being a short spike.

== Distribution, ecology and conservation ==
Babiana brachystachys can be found between Vredendal in the south and Wallekraal, which is about 20 km inland of Hondeklip Bay, in the north. Here it grows near the coast on deep white sands, on hills and inland dunes in the so-called West Coast strandveld, which is part of the Succulent Karoo biome. The flowers of this species look like other Babiana species that have been shown to be pollinated by the long-tongued fly Moegistorhynchus longirostris, but no pollinators have been observed so far. Although mining in the Namaqua Sands area has probably caused two subpopulations to go extinct, this species also grows in strandveld and sandveld vegetations, and only a small part of the dunes have so far been mined. It is therefore considered a least-concern species.
