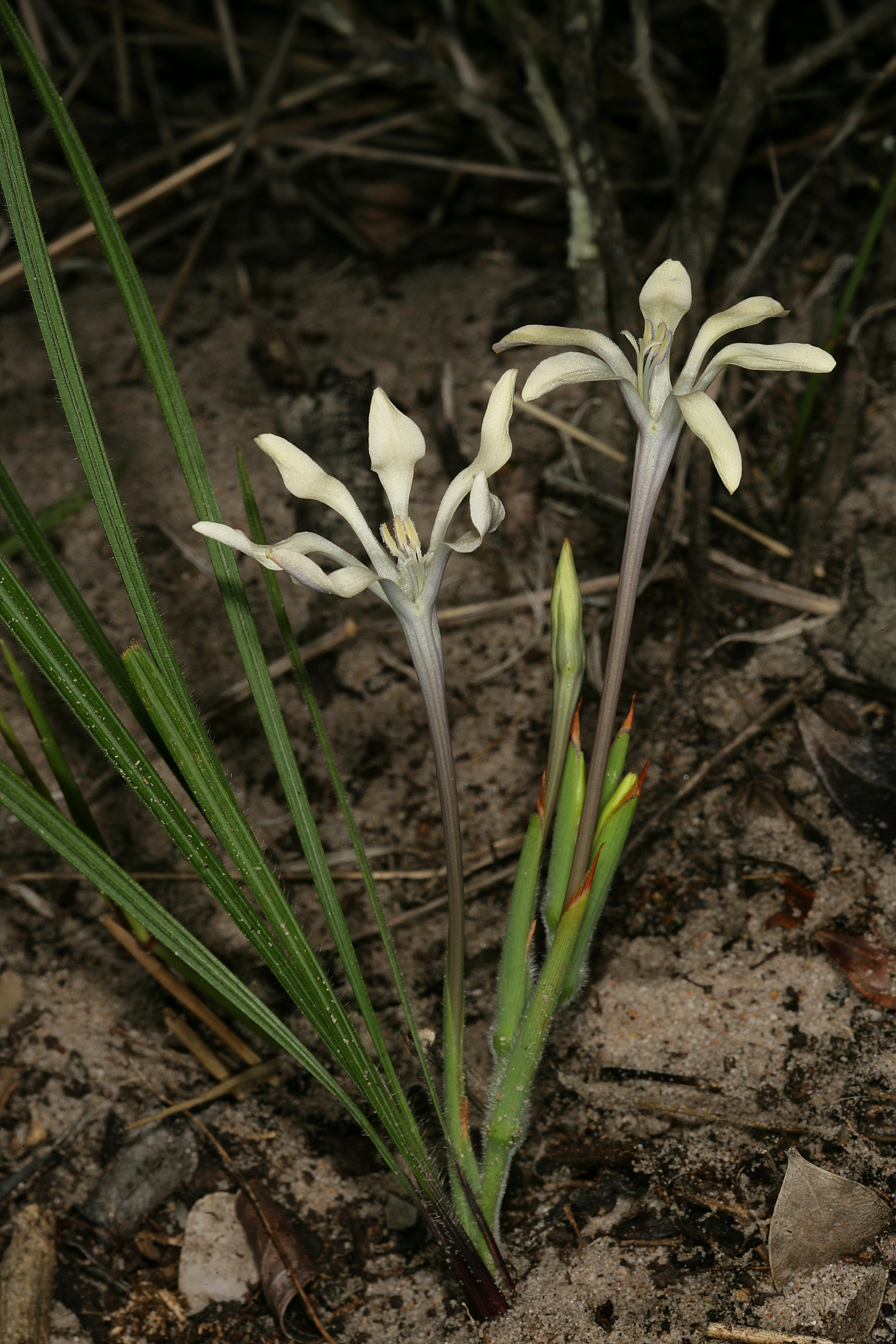

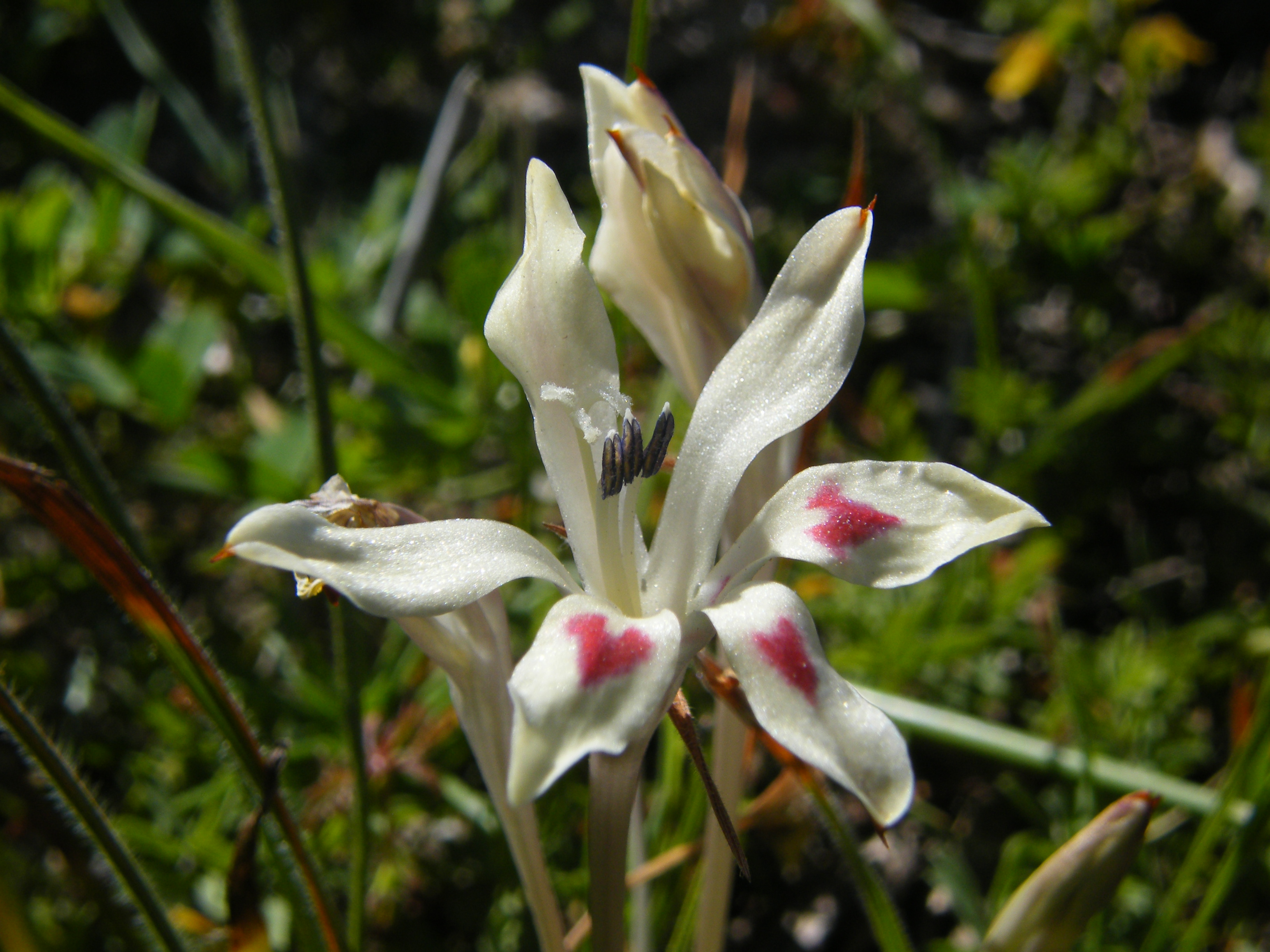

Scientific classification
- Kingdom: Plantae
- Clade: Tracheophytes
- Clade: Angiosperms
- Clade: Monocots
- Order: Asparagales
- Family: Iridaceae
- Genus: Babiana
- Species: B. tubiflora

Binomial name
- Babiana tubiflora (L.f.) Ker Gawl.

Synonyms
- Synonymy: Gladiolus tubiflorus L.f.; Gladiolus angustifolius Lam.; Gladiolus elongatus Salisb.; Gladiolus inclinatus DC.; Gladiolus inclinatus Redouté; Babiana tubulosa var. tubiflora G.J.Lewis

= Babiana tubiflora =

Species of flowering plant

Babiana tubiflora is a species of geophyte of 7–15 cm (2.8–5.9 in) high that is assigned to the family Iridaceae. It has whitish mirror-symmetrical flowers with a long narrow tube that split into six tepal lobes, have three stamens, and line- to lance-shaped, laterally compressed leaves. It is an endemic species of South Africa that can be found along the west and south coast of the Western Cape province. It flowers from August to early October.

== Description ==
Babiana tubiflora is a perennial plant of 7–15 cm (2.8–5.9 in) high that emerges from an underground globular corm at the start of its growing season. The stem is covered in dense white velvety hairs and lacks the fibrous collar where it emerges from the ground, that is present in almost all other Babiana species. It often produces slender runners that serve vegetative reproduction. Its leaves are line- to lance-shaped, 3–6 mm (0.12–0.24 in) wide, smooth or sparsely hairy, with a laterally compressed blade that has a right and left surface, rather than an upper and lower surface. It is also pleated, meaning that the surfaces of the leaf abruptly and repeatedly change angle at the location of one of the veins. Each flower is subtended by two bracts of 35–60 mm (1.4–2.4 in) long, the outer bract double to quadruple the length of the inner and clasping the inner bract. Both bracts are velvety hairy and green in colour except for the dry brown tips. The inner bract is forked at the tip only.

The inflorescence consists of mostly six to twelve scentless, whitish, mirror symmetrical flowers with a merged perianth tube of 60–80 mm (2.4–3.1 in) (rarely as short as 45 mm (1.8 in) or as long as 100 mm (3.9 in)) long, with six tepal lobes. The tepal lobes are narrower near their base. The dorsal tepal lobe is only a little bit larger than the others at 18–23 mm (0.71–0.91 in) long, the three lower tepals are 3–4 mm (0.12–0.16 in) wide and are often adorned with a small, approximately heart-shaped pink to raspberry red marking. The three stamens are crowded under the dorsal tepal, have curved filaments of 13–16 mm (0.51–0.63 in) long, topped with anthers of 4–5 mm (0.16–0.20 in) long. The ovary is hairless and topped by a long, thread-like style that splits into three branches of 3–4 mm (0.12–0.16 in) long opposite the upper half or slightly above the tip of the anthers. Flowers appear from August to usually the middle of September, occasionally until early October.

=== Differences with similar species ===
Babiana tubulosa also has pale flowers with a comparably long perianth tube. It can be distinguished by its more robust habit, wider and hairy, sword-shaped leaves of 8–12 mm (0.31–0.47 in) wide, cream-coloured flowers from mid-September to mid-October, that are flushed pink on the reverse, with a perianth tube with a distinct gullet, filaments of 20–22 mm (0.79–0.87 in) long and style branches of about 6 mm (0.24 in) long. B. brachystachys has cream-coloured flowers, pink on the reverse, 4-5 mm long filaments, about 5 mm long anthers, and is the only Babiana species with terete leaves. B. tubiflora has leaves of 3-6 mm wide, flowers that usually flower until mid-September and are white or cream on the reverse, a perianth tube without a gullet, filaments of 13-16 mm and style branches 3-4 mm long. Lapeirousia fabricii has flowers that are remarkably similar in colour and shape to B. tubulosa and B. tubiflora and these species are all pollinated by the same long-tongued fly species. Lapeirousia fabricii, however, has leaves that have an upper and lower surface, are not pleated and are hairless, and the corm is protected by a woody tunic, rather than a fibrous one.

== Taxonomy ==
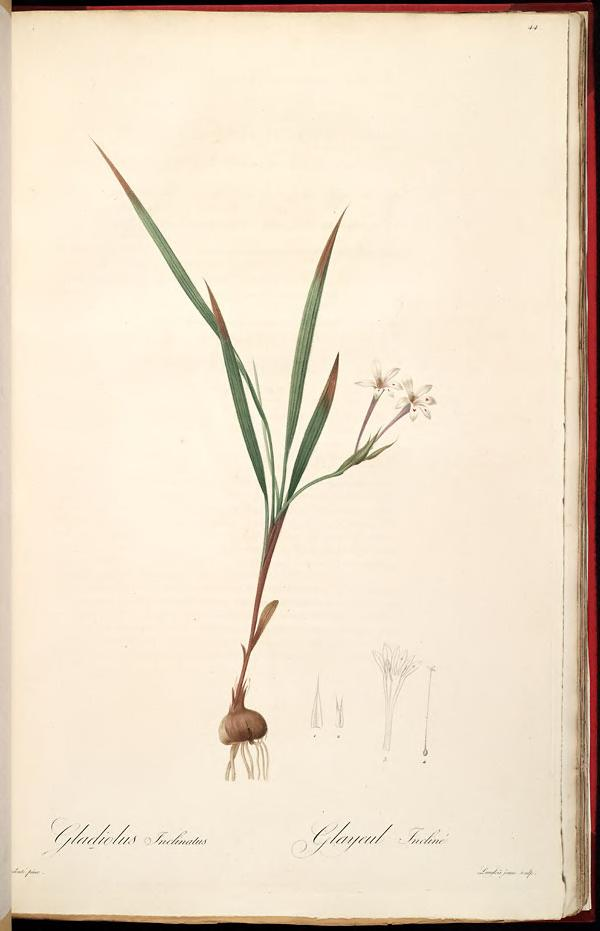
Gladiolus inclinatus, etching by Redouté from Les Liliacees (1805)

This species was first described by Carl Linnaeus the Younger as Gladiolus tubiflorus in 1782, based on specimens collected by Carl Thunberg from the Swartland area. Jean-Baptiste Lamarck described Gladiolus angustifolius in 1791, Richard Anthony Salisbury named Gladiolus elongatus in 1796, Augustin Pyramus de Candolle described Gladiolus inclinatus, and the same name was used by Pierre-Joseph Redouté 1803.John Bellenden Ker Gawler in 1802 created thea new genus name Babiana to accommodate the species of bobbejaantjie. He created the name Babiana tubiflora in 1804. Gwendoline Joyce Lewis in her 1959 revision of the genus, reduced the taxon to a variety of B. tubulosa. Goldblatt and Manning regarded all these names as synonyms, did not support the inclusion of B. tubulosa var. tubiflora and restored the taxon to species level in 2007.

== Distribution, ecology and conservation ==
Babiana tubiflora can be found in the West Cape province of South Africa, inland around the Piketberg and Darling, and along the coast between Lambert's Bay at its northwestern limit and Stilbaai in the southeast. It is pollinated by the long-tongued fly Moegistorhynchus longirostris. Remarkably, self-fertilization leads to good seed development, a trait rare among Babiana species and shared as far as known only with B. ringens. The seeds of this species take about three years to develop into flowering plants. This species grows in strandveld and fynbos sandy on coastal flats and dunes. It has a distribution area of 47,000 km^{2} (18,000 mi^{2}) and is known from more than ten locations which are not much fragmented. The species is declining due to significant habitat loss both caused by agricultural expansion, coastal and urban development. It went locally extinct, most notably on the Cape Flats. The species is tolerant of severe disturbance, but coastal development is ongoing and habitat loss is irreversible. The species is currently not threatened but should be monitored. B. tubiflora is still regarded a least-concern species.
