= Pseudoerinna jonesi =

Scientific classification
- Kingdom: Animalia
- Phylum: Arthropoda
- Class: Insecta
- Order: Diptera
- Family: Pelecorhynchidae
- Genus: Pseudoerinna
- Species: P. jonesi

Binomial name
- Pseudoerinna jonesi (Cresson, 1919)

Synonyms
- Arthropeas jonesi Cresson, 1919; Bequaertomyia anthracina Brennan, 1935

Species of fly

Pseudoerinna jonesi is a species of fly in the family Pelecorhynchidae.
