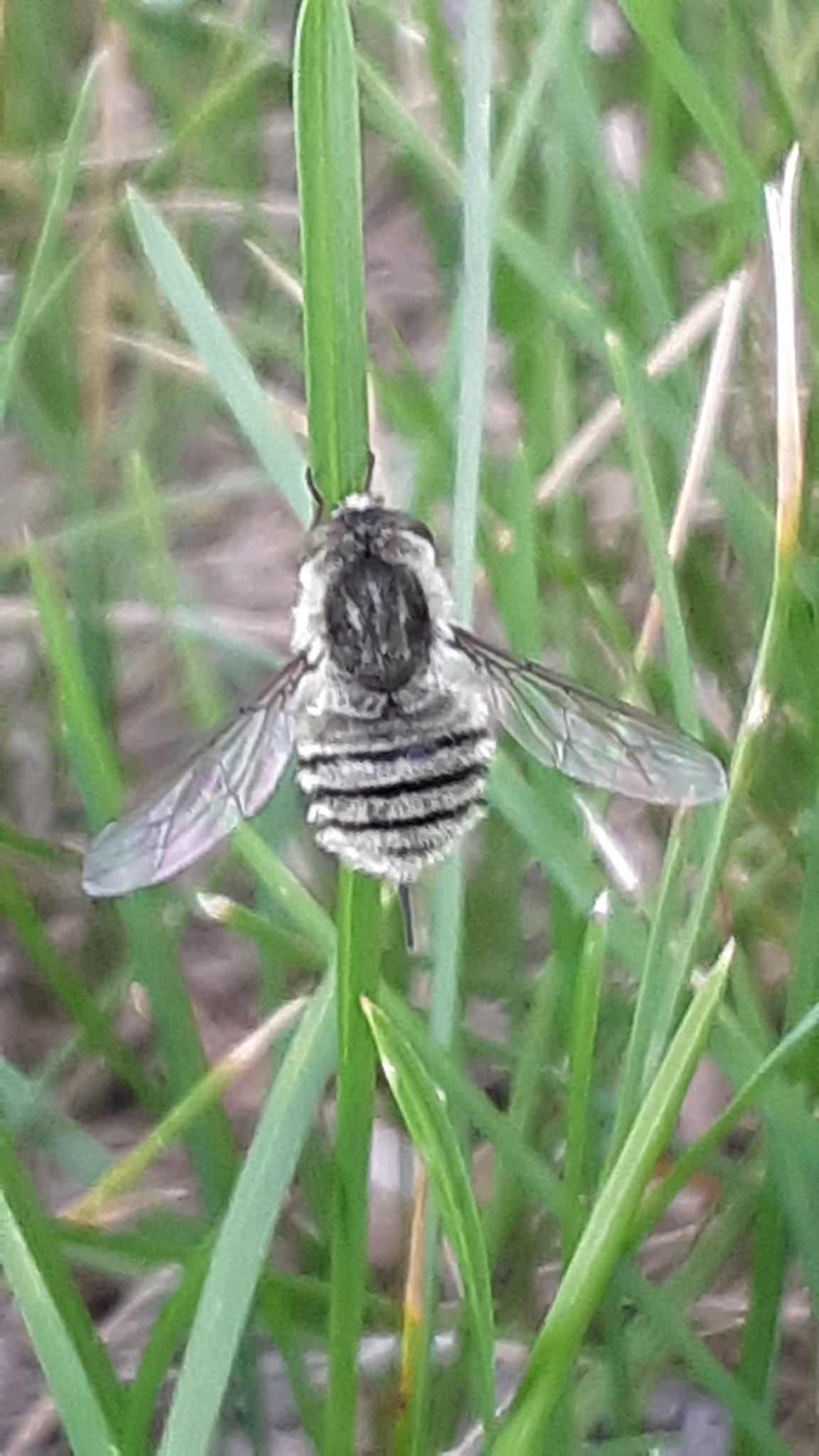

Scientific classification
- Domain: Eukaryota
- Kingdom: Animalia
- Phylum: Arthropoda
- Class: Insecta
- Order: Diptera
- Family: Nemestrinidae
- Genus: Neorhynchocephalus
- Species: N. sackenii

Binomial name
- Neorhynchocephalus sackenii (Williston, 1880)

Synonyms
- Rhynchocephalus sackenii Williston, 1880; Rhynchocephalus subnitens Cockerell, 1908

= Neorhynchocephalus sackenii =

Species of fly

Neorhynchocephalus sackenii is a species of tangle-veined fly in the family Nemestrinidae.
