= Rhagionemestriidae =

Rhagionemestriidae Temporal range: Callovian–Cenomanian

Scientific classification
- Kingdom: Animalia
- Phylum: Arthropoda
- Class: Insecta
- Order: Diptera
- Superfamily: Nemestrinoidea
- Family: †Rhagionemestriidae; Ussatchov 1968

Genera
- See text

Extinct family of flies

Rhagionemestriidae is an extinct family of brachyceran flies known from the Jurassic and Cretaceous periods. It was first named as a subfamily of the Nemestrinidae by Ussatchov (1968), and was raised to full family status by Nagatomi and Yang (1998). They are considered to be closely related to the family Acroceridae. Similar to Acroceridae, members of the family possess a large hemispherical head, with eyes covering nearly all of the area.

== Taxonomy ==
- †Cretinemestrinus Zhang et al. 2020
  - †Cretinemestrinus euremus Grimaldi 2016 (formerly Jurassinemestrinus eurema) Burmese amber, Myanmar, Cenomanian
- †Burminemestrinus Zhang et al. 2020
  - †Burminemestrinus qiyani Zhang et al. 2020 Burmese amber, Myanmar, Cenomanian
- †Iberomosca Mostovski and Martínez-Delclòs 2000
  - †Iberomosca kakoeima Mostovski and Martínez-Delclòs 2000 La Pedrera de Rúbies Formation, Spain, Barremian
  - †Iberomosca ponomarenkoi Mostovski and Martínez-Delclòs 2000 Dzun-Bain Formation, Mongolia, Aptian
- †Jurassinemestrinus Zhang 2010
  - †Jurassinemestrinus orientalis Zhang 2010 Daohugou, China, Callovian
- †Nagatomukha Mostovski and Martínez-Delclòs 2000
  - †Nagatomukha karabas Mostovski and Martínez-Delclòs 2000 Karabastau Formation, Kazakhstan, Oxfordian
- †Rhagionemestrius Ussatchov 1968
  - †Rhagionemestrius rapidus Ussatchov 1968 Karabastau Formation, Kazakhstan, Oxfordian
- †Sinomusca Nel 2010
  - †Sinomusca mostovskii Nel 2010 Yixian Formation, China, Aptian
- †Viriosinemestrius Zhang et al. 2020
  - †Viriosinemestrius mai Zhang et al. 2020 Burmese amber, Myanmar, Cenomanian
