= Glenostictia pictifrons =

Scientific classification
- Domain: Eukaryota
- Kingdom: Animalia
- Phylum: Arthropoda
- Class: Insecta
- Order: Hymenoptera
- Family: Bembicidae
- Tribe: Bembicini
- Subtribe: Stictiellina
- Genus: Glenostictia
- Species: G. pictifrons

Binomial name
- Glenostictia pictifrons (F. Smith, 1856)

Synonyms
- Monedula denverensis Cameron, 1908; Monedula inermis Handlirsch, 1890; Monedula pictifrons F. Smith, 1856

Species of wasp

Glenostictia pictifrons is a species of sand wasp in the family Bembicidae. It is found in North America. It is known to be a predator of many types of flies, including the bombyliids that are parasitoids of Glenostictia, and rare fly species such as Neorhynchocephalus volaticus.
