= Nemestrinus rufipes =

Scientific classification
- Kingdom: Animalia
- Phylum: Arthropoda
- Class: Insecta
- Order: Diptera
- Family: Nemestrinidae
- Genus: Nemestrinus
- Species: N. rufipes

Binomial name
- Nemestrinus rufipes (Olivier, 1810)

Synonyms
- Nemestrina rufipes Olivier, 1810

Species of fly

Nemestrinus rufipes is a very large species of fly which is found the Middle East. It has been recorded from Algeria to Qatar and Egypt. As with the rest of the family, little is known about this species. Its behaviour resembles that of a bee-fly in adult and possibly larval stages. The fly has a wingspan of almost 5 centimetres and a body length estimated to be more than 3 and a half centimetres. It is possibly the largest species of fly in the Old World.

It hovers, and can be mistaken for a hummingbird or a hawkmoth due to its size, flight, and very long extendable proboscis. It feeds on many flowers, including wild radish and bougainvillea; whilst the larval life cycle remains unknown, it is likely an endoparasite of Orthoptera like other members of its family.
