= Neorhynchocephalus volaticus =

Scientific classification
- Domain: Eukaryota
- Kingdom: Animalia
- Phylum: Arthropoda
- Class: Insecta
- Order: Diptera
- Family: Nemestrinidae
- Genus: Neorhynchocephalus
- Species: N. volaticus

Binomial name
- Neorhynchocephalus volaticus (Williston, 1883)

Synonyms
- Rhynchocephalus flavus Curran, 1931; Rhynchocephalus maculatus Curran, 1931; Rhynchocephalus volaticus Williston, 1883

Species of fly

Neorhynchocephalus volaticus is a species of tangle-veined fly in the family Nemestrinidae.
