= Pelecorhynchus elegans =

Scientific classification
- Kingdom: Animalia
- Phylum: Arthropoda
- Class: Insecta
- Order: Diptera
- Family: Pelecorhynchidae
- Genus: Pelecorhynchus
- Species: P. elegans

Binomial name
- Pelecorhynchus elegans (Philippi, 1865)

Synonyms
- Caenura elegans Philippi, 1865; Pelecorhynchus darwini Ricardo, 1900

Species of fly

Pelecorhynchus elegans is a species of snipe flies, insects in the family Pelecorhynchidae. It is found in Chile.
