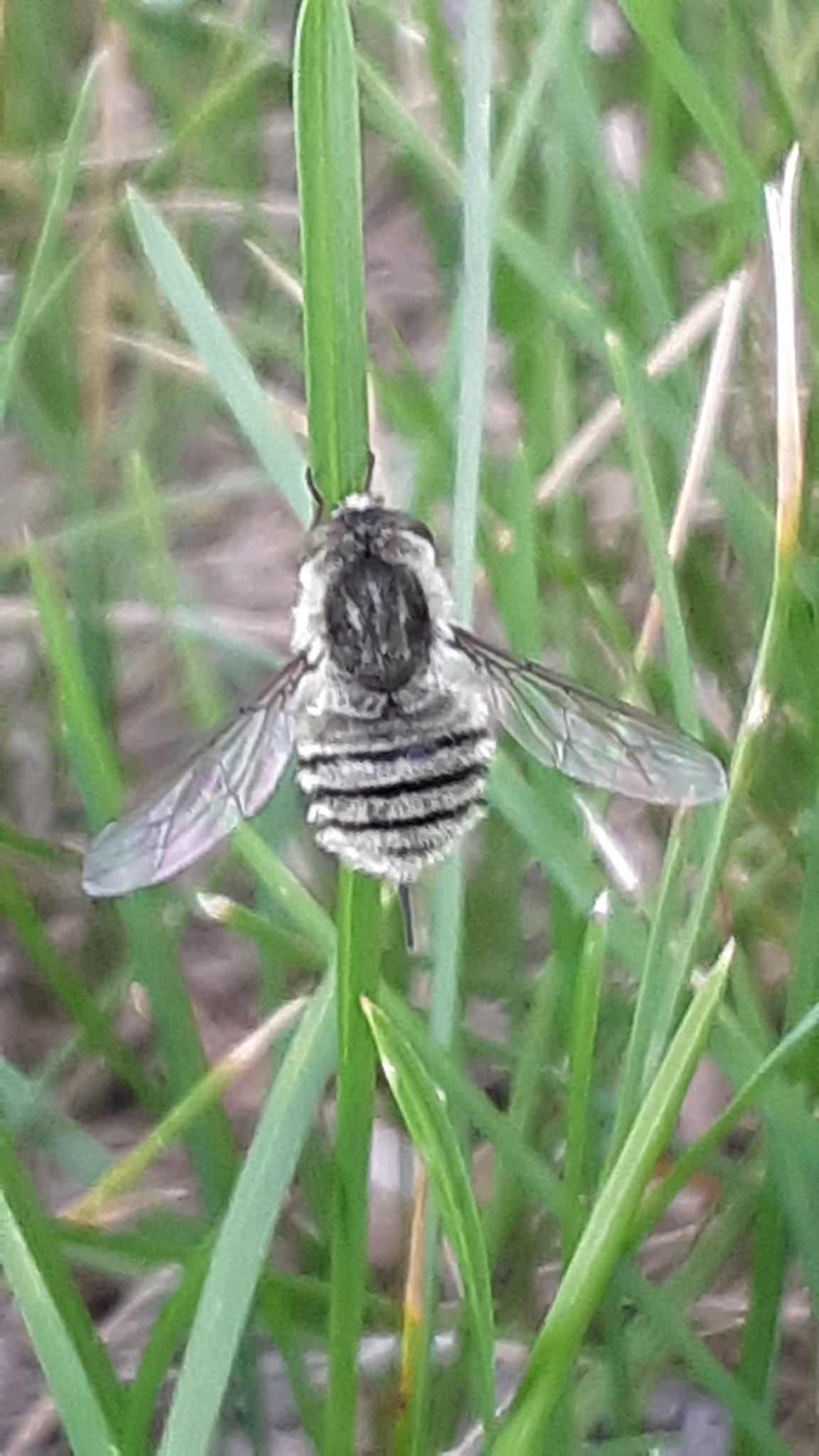
- Neorhynchocephalus sackenii

Scientific classification
- Domain: Eukaryota
- Kingdom: Animalia
- Phylum: Arthropoda
- Class: Insecta
- Order: Diptera
- Family: Nemestrinidae
- Genus: Neorhynchocephalus; Lichtwardt, 1909

= Neorhynchocephalus =

Genus of flies

Neorhynchocephalus is a genus of tangle-veined flies in the family Nemestrinidae.

== Extant species ==
- Neorhynchocephalus mendozanus (Lichtwardt, 1910)
- Neorhynchocephalus mexicanus Bequaert, 1934
- Neorhynchocephalus sackenii (Williston, 1880)
- Neorhynchocephalus sulphureus (Wiedemann, 1830)
- Neorhynchocephalus tauscheri (Fischer, 1812)
- Neorhynchocephalus vitripennis (Wiedemann, 1830)
- Neorhynchocephalus volaticus (Williston, 1883)

== Fossil species ==
- †Neorhynchocephalus melanderi (Cockerell, 1908)
- †Neorhynchocephalus occultator (Cockerell, 1908)
- †Neorhynchocephalus vulcanicus (Cockerell, 1908)
