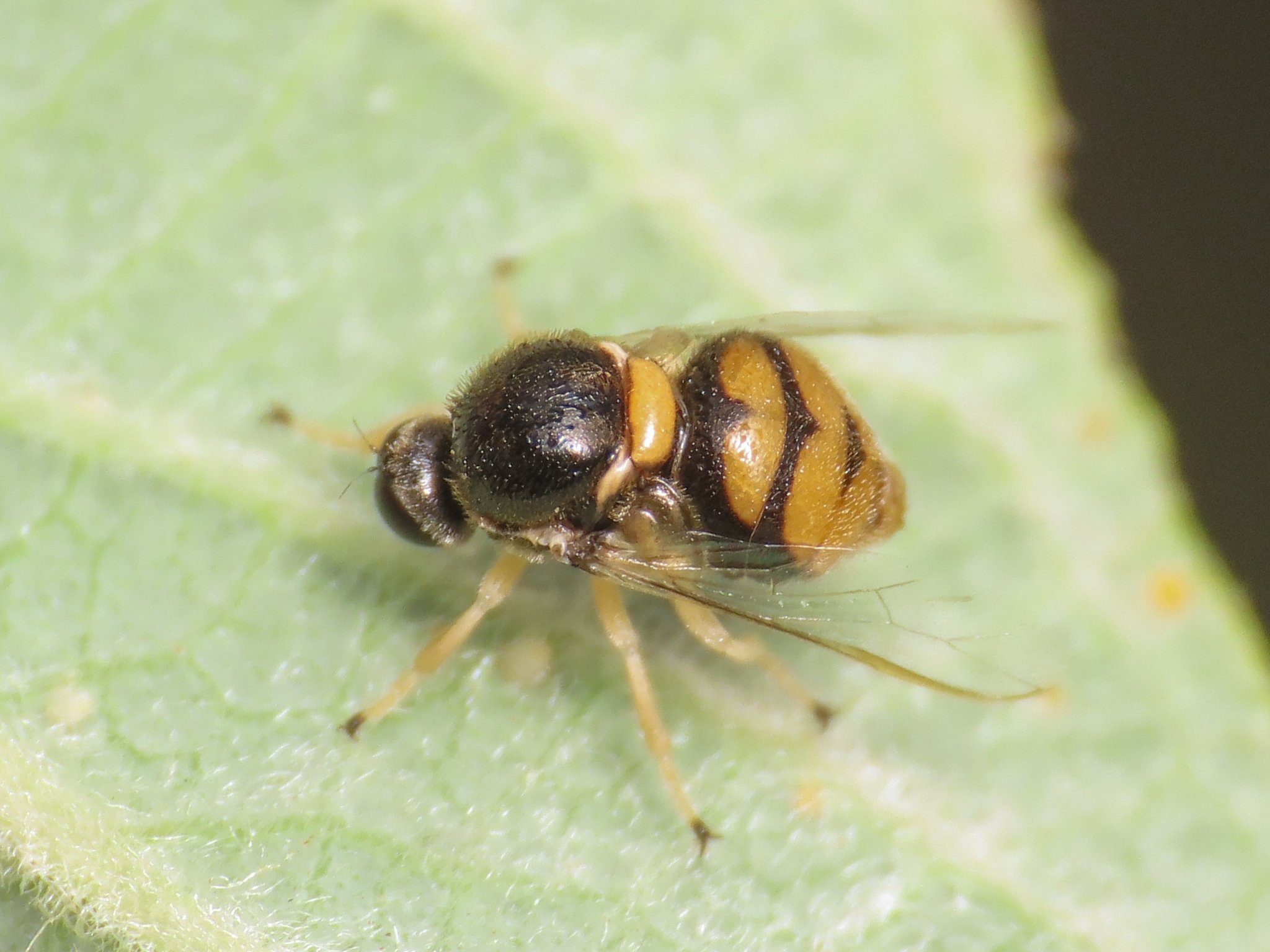
- Acrocera orbiculus (Acroceridae)
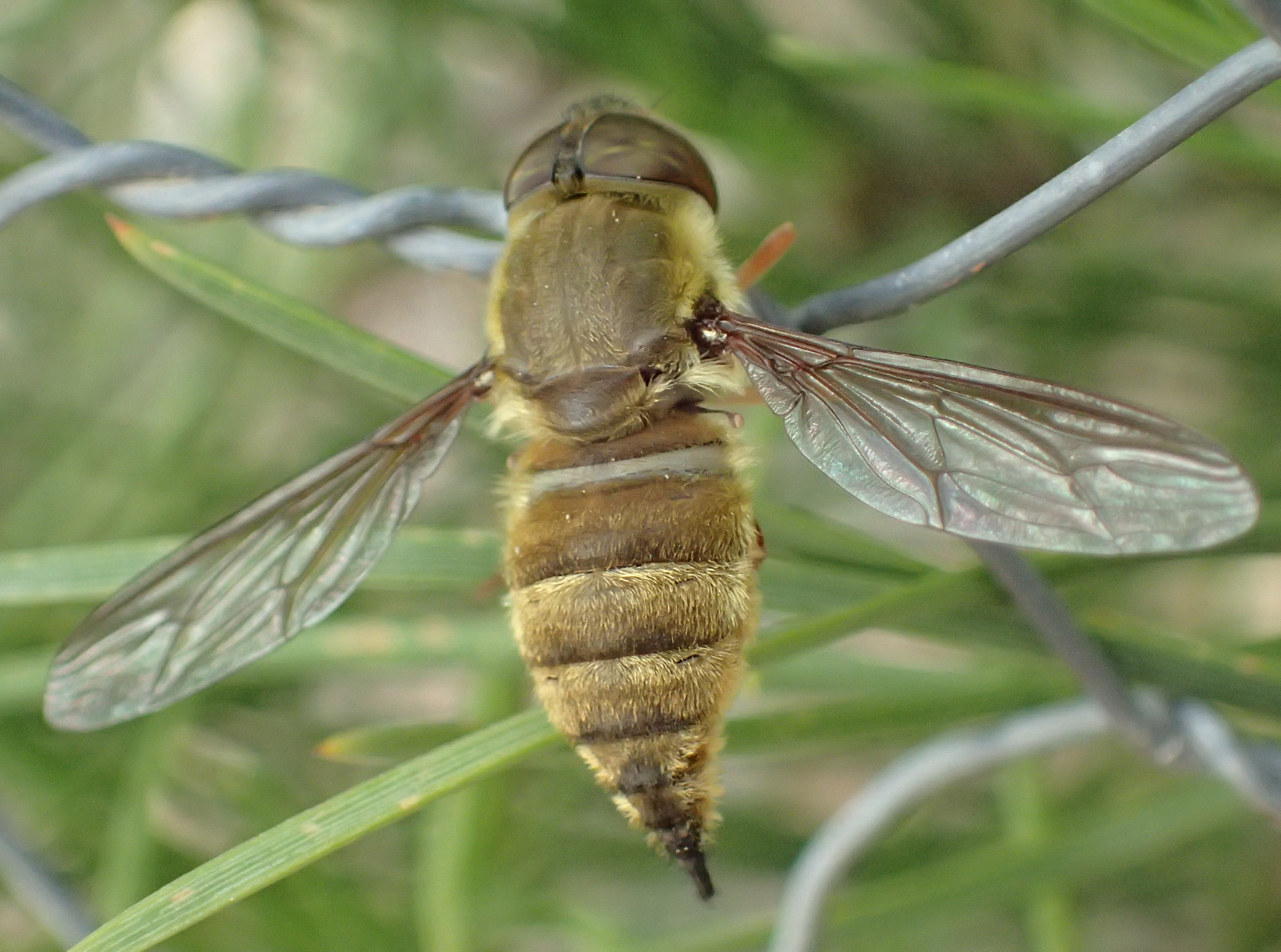
- Hirmoneura obscura (Nemestrinidae)

Scientific classification
- Kingdom: Animalia
- Phylum: Arthropoda
- Class: Insecta
- Order: Diptera
- Suborder: Brachycera
- Superfamily: Nemestrinoidea; Griffith & Pidgeon, 1832

Families
- Acroceridae; Nemestrinidae †Rhagionemestriidae

= Nemestrinoidea =

Nemestrinoidea Temporal range: Jurassic–Recent

Superfamily of flies

Nemestrinoidea is a small, monophyletic superfamily of flies, whose relationship to the other Brachycera is uncertain; they are sometimes grouped with the Tabanomorpha rather than the Asilomorpha. They are presently considered to be the sister taxon to the Asiloidea. The group contains two very small extant families, the Acroceridae and Nemestrinidae, both of which occur worldwide but contain only small numbers of rare species. One extinct family, Rhagionemestriidae, is also included in Nemestrinoidea.

These insects are parasitoids, with Acroceridae attacking spiders, and Nemestrinidae typically attacking Orthoptera. Both families have unusual and distinctive wing venation by which they can be easily recognized, in addition to other features.
