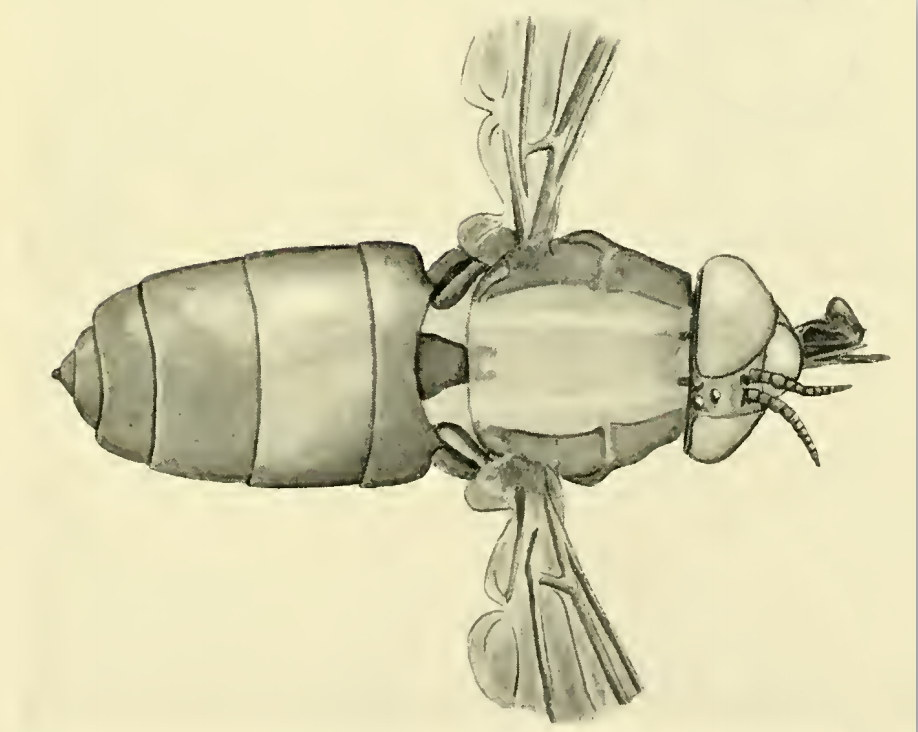
- The male allotype of Pelecorhynchus fulvus

Scientific classification
- Kingdom: Animalia
- Phylum: Arthropoda
- Clade: Pancrustacea
- Class: Insecta
- Order: Diptera
- Family: Pelecorhynchidae
- Genus: Pelecorhynchus; Macquart, 1850

Synonyms
- Archeomyia Philip, 1941; Caenopnyga Thomson, 1869; Coenura Bigot, 1857

= Pelecorhynchus =

Genus of flies

Pelecorhynchus is a genus of flies in the family Pelecorhynchidae. The adults mostly feed on nectar of Leptospermum flowers. Larvae have been collected in the damp margins of swamp areas, where they feed on earthworms.

== Distribution ==
They are mostly known from Australia & Chile.

== Species ==
- Pelecorhynchus albolineatus Hardy, 1918
- Pelecorhynchus biguttatus (Philippi, 1865)
- Pelecorhynchus claripennis Ricardo, 1910
- Pelecorhynchus deuqueti Hardy, 1920
- Pelecorhynchus distinctus Taylor, 1918
- Pelecorhynchus elegans (Philippi, 1865)
- Pelecorhynchus eristaloides (Walker, 1848)
- Pelecorhynchus eristaloides var. montanus Hardy, 1916
- Pelecorhynchus fascipennis Mackerras & Fuller, 1942
- Pelecorhynchus fergusoni Hardy, 1939
- Pelecorhynchus flavipennis Ferguson, 1921
- Pelecorhynchus fulvus Ricardo, 1910
- Pelecorhynchus fusconiger (Walker, 1848)
- Pelecorhynchus hualqui Llanos & González, 2015
- Pelecorhynchus igniculus Hardy, 1918
- Pelecorhynchus interruptus Mackerras & Fuller, 1942
- Pelecorhynchus kippsi Mackerras & Fuller, 1942
- Pelecorhynchus kroeberi (Lindner, 1925)
- Pelecorhynchus lineatus Mackerras & Fuller, 1942
- Pelecorhynchus longicauda (Bigot, 1857)
- Pelecorhynchus lunulatus Mackerras & Fuller, 1953
- Pelecorhynchus mackerrasi Daniels, 1977
- Pelecorhynchus mirabilis Taylor, 1917
- Pelecorhynchus nebulosus Mackerras & Fuller, 1942
- Pelecorhynchus nero Mackerras & Fuller, 1942
- Pelecorhynchus niger Mackerras & Fuller, 1942
- Pelecorhynchus nigripennis Ricardo, 1910
- Pelecorhynchus occidens Hardy, 1933
- Pelecorhynchus olivei Hardy, 1933
- Pelecorhynchus penai Pechuman, 1967
- Pelecorhynchus personatus (Walker, 1848)
- Pelecorhynchus rubidus Mackerras & Fuller, 1942
- Pelecorhynchus simplex Mackerras & Fuller, 1942
- Pelecorhynchus simplissimus Mackerras & Fuller, 1942
- Pelecorhynchus taeniatus Mackerras & Fuller, 1942
- Pelecorhynchus tigris Daniels, 1977
- Pelecorhynchus tillyardi Taylor, 1918
- Pelecorhynchus toltensis Llanos & González, 2015
- Pelecorhynchus vulpes (Macquart, 1850)
- Pelecorhynchus xanthopleura (Philippi, 1865)
