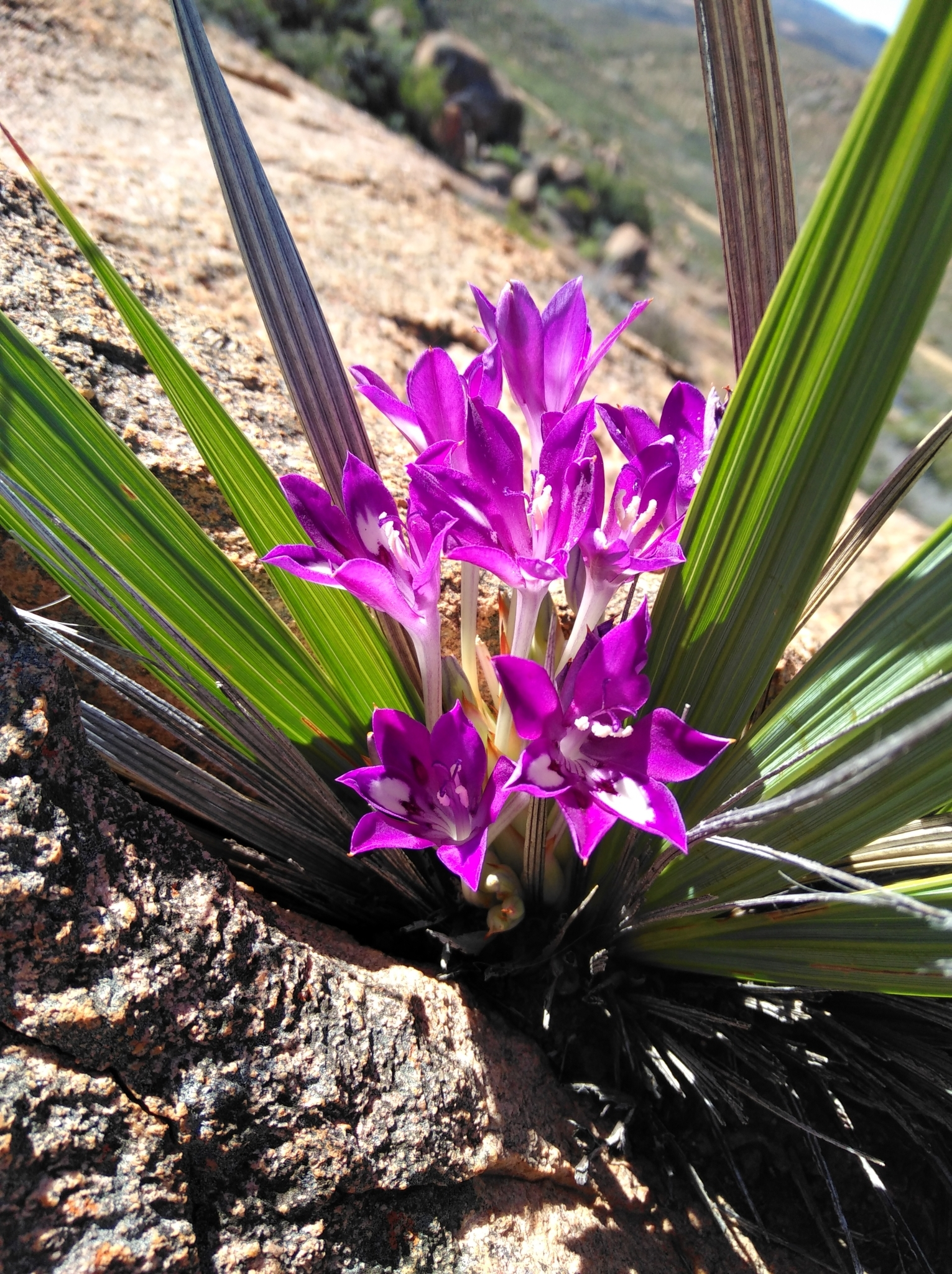

Conservation status
- Least Concern (SANBI Red List)

Scientific classification
- Kingdom: Plantae
- Clade: Tracheophytes
- Clade: Angiosperms
- Clade: Monocots
- Order: Asparagales
- Family: Iridaceae
- Genus: Babiana
- Species: B. dregei

Binomial name
- Babiana dregei Baker

= Babiana dregei =

Geophyte endemic to the Northern Cape

Babiana dregei is a species of geophyte in the genus Babiana. It is characterised by its sword- to lance-shaped, very rigid, pointed leaves and the mirror-symmetrical blue-purple flowers with white markings. It is called Kamies spikeleaf bobbejaantjie in South Africa. It is endemic to central Namaqualand, in the Northern Cape province of South Africa.

It was named after the brother botanists Carl Friedrich Drege (1791-1867) and Johann Franz Drege (1794-1881) who collected plants in the Cape.

== Description ==
The Kamies spikeleaf bobbejaantjie is a geophyte of mostly around 15 cm (5.9 in), occasionally up to 35 cm (14 in) high including the leaves, that survives the hot, dry summer as a round underground corm. Where the stem surfaces, it bends horizontally below the flowers, and it is mostly branched. It is not round in cross section but is edged, and is hairless or with minute hairs along the axis. The leaves are sword- to lance-shaped, hairless, pleated and with conspicuously thickened veins and margins that turn pale yellow when drying, the tip ending in a stiff, hard, and very sharp point. Each flower is subtended by two bracts that are green or dry at the tips, and covered in fine downy hairs. The outer bract is 3½-6 cm long with a ridge on the midline, the inner is ½-1 cm shorter and forked at the tip. Several scentless, deep purple-blue to magenta, mirrorsymmetrical flowers, the bottom tepals marked with white splashed in a dark blue edging. The perianth consists of six tepals that are at their base merged into tube of about 5-6½ cm long. The tube is straight or slightly curved near the throat. The tepals are unequal in size. The dorsal tepal is 18-28 mm long, the three lower tepals are slightly shorter and merged to the lateral upper tepals for about 2 mm, forming a lip. The three stamens are located near the dorsal petal and consist of 11-15 mm long filaments and about 8 mm long anthers. The hairless ovary is topped by the style that forks in three branches opposite the upper half of the anthers or even higher up. The plants flower between late August and the end of September.

== Distribution, ecology and conservation ==
The Kamies spikeleaf bobbejaantjie occurs on granite outcrops in the centre of Namaqualand, in the highland between Kamieskroon and Garies, particularly on the Kamiesberge. The flowers are pollinated by the Longtongue Tanglevein Fly Prosoeca peringueyi. Babiana dregei is classified as Least Concern, as the population trend is stable.
