= Glenostictia =

Scientific classification
- Domain: Eukaryota
- Kingdom: Animalia
- Phylum: Arthropoda
- Class: Insecta
- Order: Hymenoptera
- Family: Bembicidae
- Subfamily: Bembicinae
- Tribe: Bembicini
- Subtribe: Stictiellina
- Genus: Glenostictia; Gillaspy, 1962

Genus of wasps

Glenostictia is a genus of sand wasps in the family Bembicidae. There are more than 20 described species in Glenostictia.

== Species ==
These 21 species belong to the genus Glenostictia:

- Glenostictia angulata Gillaspy, 1985
- Glenostictia angulifera R. Bohart, 1985
- Glenostictia argentata (C. Fox, 1923)
- Glenostictia arizonae R. Bohart, 1983
- Glenostictia bifurcata (C. Fox, 1923)
- Glenostictia bituberculata (J. Parker, 1917)
- Glenostictia californica R. Bohart, 1983
- Glenostictia clypeata (Gillaspy, 1959)
- Glenostictia gilva Gillaspy, 1963
- Glenostictia megacera (J. Parker, 1917)
- Glenostictia mexicana R. Bohart, 1983
- Glenostictia nigriloba R. Bohart, 1983
- Glenostictia parva R. Bohart, 1983
- Glenostictia pictifrons (F. Smith, 1856)
- Glenostictia pulla (Handlirsch, 1890)
- Glenostictia satan Gillaspy, 1983
- Glenostictia scitula (W. Fox, 1895)
- Glenostictia tenuicornis (W. Fox, 1895)
- Glenostictia terlinguae (C. Fox, 1928)
- Glenostictia vechti R. Bohart, 1983
- Glenostictia veracruzae R. Bohart, 1983
