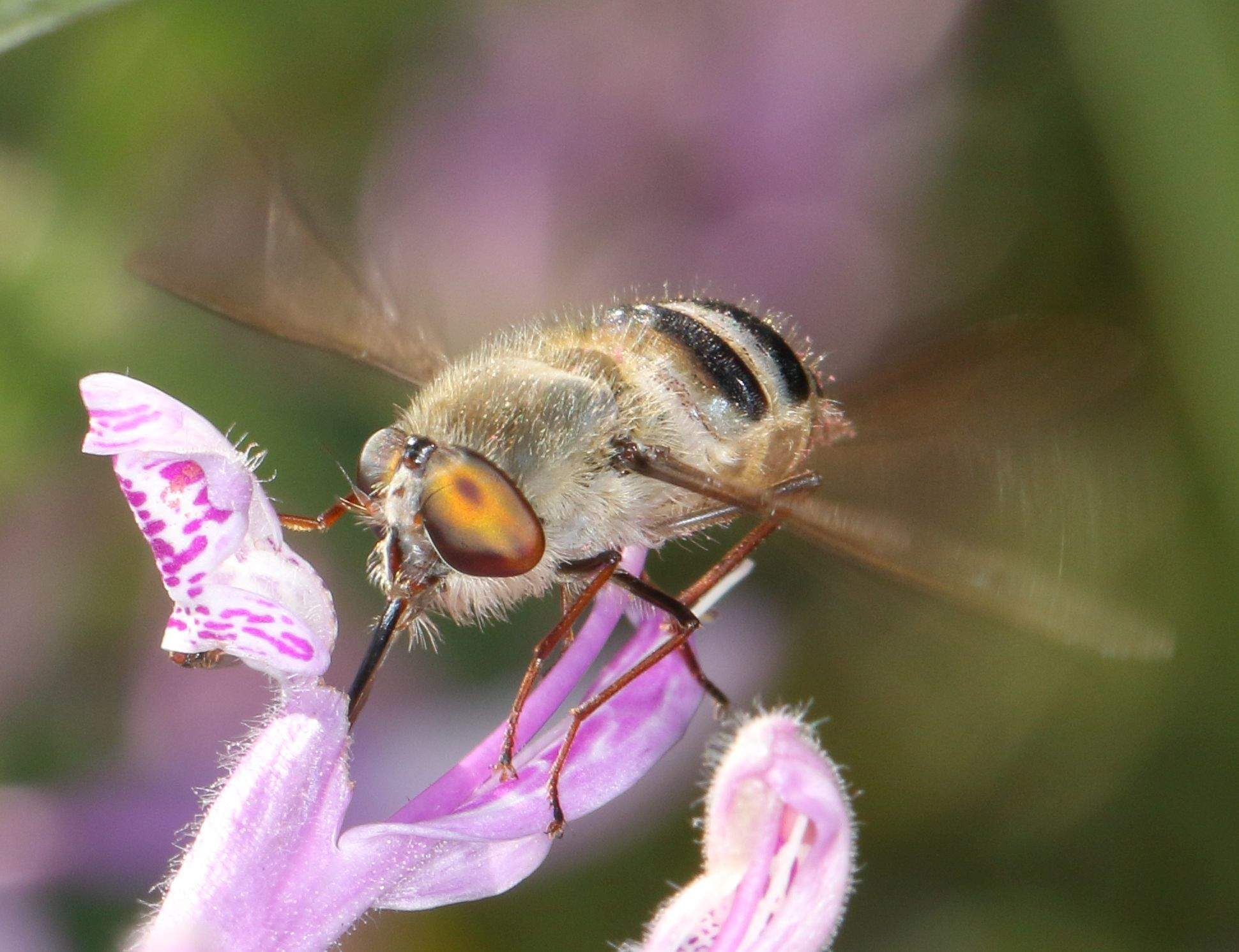
- Prosoeca circumdata

Scientific classification
- Kingdom: Animalia
- Phylum: Arthropoda
- Clade: Pancrustacea
- Class: Insecta
- Order: Diptera
- Family: Nemestrinidae
- Subfamily: Nemestrininae
- Genus: Prosoeca; Schiner, 1867

= Prosoeca =

Genus of flies

Prosoeca is a genus of tangle-veined flies in the family Nemestrinidae. It was described in 1867 by Ignaz Rudolph Schiner. It was assigned to the family Nemestrinidae by Frank M. Carpenter in 1992; and to the subfamily Nemestrininae by Mike Mostovski and Xavier Martínez-Delclòs in 2000.

== Species ==
The genus Prosoeca has at least 41 species:

- Prosoeca accincta (Wiedemann, 1830)
- Prosoeca atra (Macquart, 1846)
- Prosoeca beckeri Lichtwardt, 1920
- Prosoeca caffraria Lichtwardt, 1910
- Prosoeca circumdata Lichtwardt, 1910
- Prosoeca connexa Bezzi, 1924
- Prosoeca difficile (Bequaert, 1925)
- Prosoeca flavipennis Lichtwardt, 1910
- Prosoeca florigera (Scudder, 1878)
- Prosoeca fusca (Loew, 1860)
- Prosoeca ganglbaueri Lichtwardt, 1910
- Prosoeca handlirschi Lichtwardt, 1910
- Prosoeca ignita Bezzi, 1924
- Prosoeca lata Lichtwardt, 1910
- Prosoeca lichtwardti Bezzi, 1924
- Prosoeca longipennis (Loew, 1858)
- Prosoeca longirostris (Macquart, 1846)
- Prosoeca macularis (Wiedemann, 1828)
- Prosoeca major Bezzi, 1924
- Prosoeca marinusi Barraclough, Colville, Karolyi & Krenn, 2018
- Prosoeca minimum (Bezzi, 1924)
- Prosoeca nigripes (Macquart, 1840)
- Prosoeca nitidula Bezzi, 1924
- Prosoeca obscura (Westwood, 1835)
- Prosoeca oldroydi Hull, 1958
- Prosoeca olivacea Brunetti, 1929
- Prosoeca ornata Lichtwardt, 1910
- Prosoeca peringueyi Lichtwardt, 1920
- Prosoeca pygmea Hull, 1958
- Prosoeca quinque Lichtwardt, 1920
- Prosoeca robusta Bezzi, 1924
- Prosoeca rubicunda Bezzi, 1924
- Prosoeca saxea Mostovski & Martínez-Delclòs, 2000
- Prosoeca sublineata Bequaert, 1926
- Prosoeca torquata Theron, 2020
- Prosoeca umbrosa Lichtwardt, 1910
- Prosoeca variabilis (Loew, 1858)
- Prosoeca variegata (Loew, 1858)
- Prosoeca westermanni (Wiedemann, 1821)
- Prosoeca willowmorensis Lichtwardt, 1910
- Prosoeca zuluensis Lichtwardt, 1920

One extinct species in a subgenus of Prosoeca exists:

- †Prosoeca (Palembolus) saxea Mostovski & Martínez-Delclòs, 2000
