= Austroleptis =

Scientific classification
- Kingdom: Animalia
- Phylum: Arthropoda
- Class: Insecta
- Order: Diptera
- Infraorder: Tabanomorpha
- Superfamily: Rhagionoidea
- Family: Austroleptidae; Nagatomi, 1982
- Genus: Austroleptis; Hardy, 1920

Type species
- Austroleptis rhyphoides Hardy, 1920

Species
- See text

Genus of flies

Austroleptis is a genus of snipe flies, and the sole genus in the family Austroleptidae; until 2010, it was placed in the family Rhagionidae. They are small to moderately sized flies of around 3 to 7.7 mm.

The family Austroleptidae was originally created by Nagatomi (1982) as "Austroleptinae", a subfamily of Rhagionidae. It was later proposed that it be raised to family rank by Stuckenburg (2001).

== Species ==
- Austroleptis atrata Nagatomi & Nagatomi, 1987 – Neotropic
- Austroleptis atriceps Malloch, 1932 – Neotropic
- Austroleptis breviflagella Nagatomi & Nagatomi, 1987 – Neotropic
- Austroleptis camposgerais Fachin, Santos & Amorim, 2020 – Neotropic
- Austroleptis collessi Paramonov, 1962 – Australasia
- Austroleptis fulviceps Malloch, 1932 – Neotropic
- Austroleptis longirostris Fachin, Santos & Amorim, 2018 – Neotropic
- Austroleptis multimaculata Hardy, 1920 – Australasia
- Austroleptis papaveroi Fachin, Santos & Amorim, 2018 – Neotropic
- Austroleptis penai Nagatomi & Nagatomi, 1987 – Neotropic
- Austroleptis rhyphoides Hardy, 1920 – Australasia
