= Pseudoerinna =

Scientific classification
- Kingdom: Animalia
- Phylum: Arthropoda
- Class: Insecta
- Order: Diptera
- Family: Pelecorhynchidae
- Genus: Pseudoerinna; Shiraki, 1932

Synonyms
- Bequaertomyia Brennan, 1935

Genus of flies

Pseudoerinna is a genus of flies in the family Pelecorhynchidae.

== Species ==
- Pseudoerinna fuscata Shiraki, 1932
- Pseudoerinna jonesi (Cresson, 1919)
