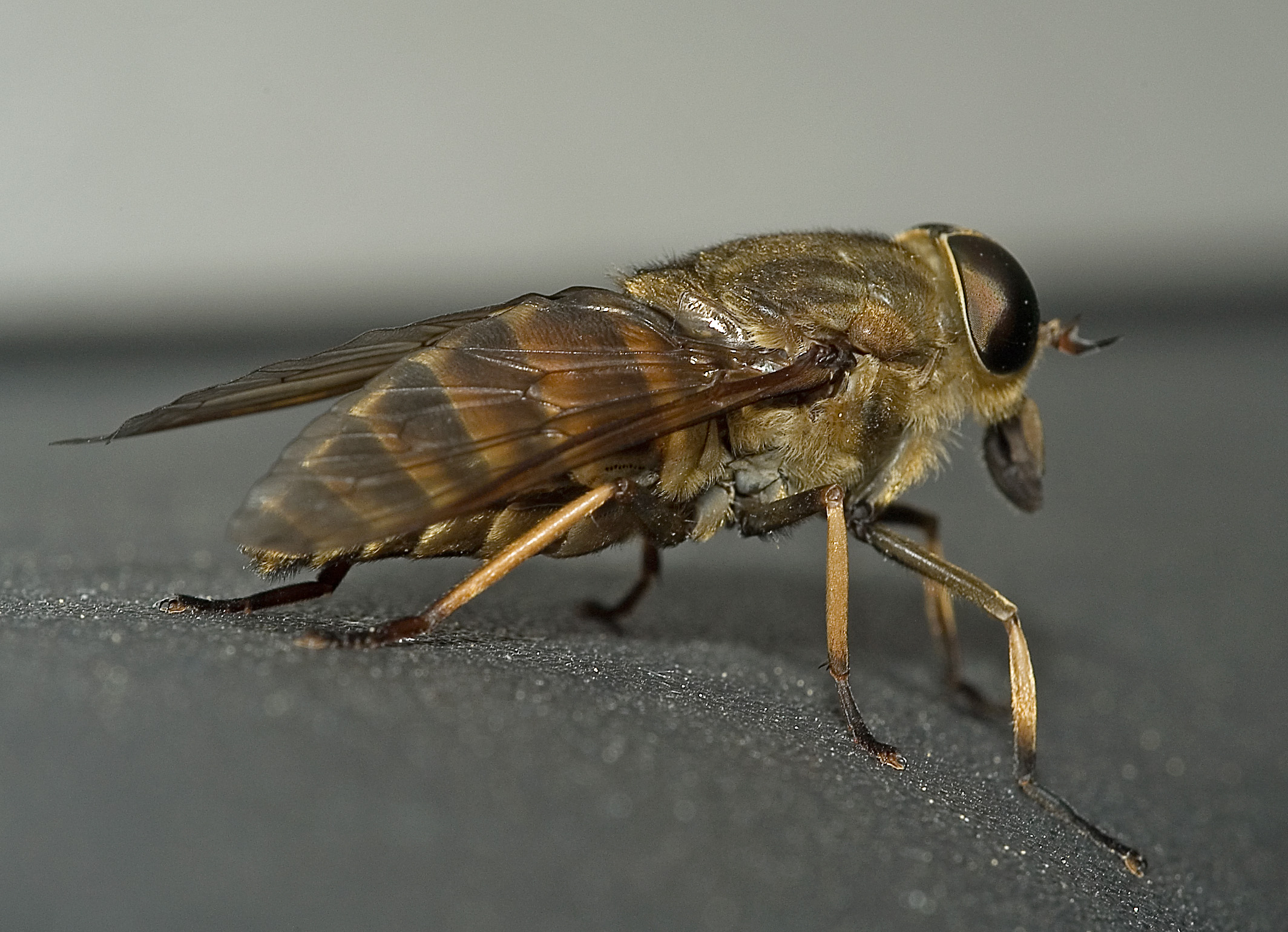
- Tabanus sudeticus

Scientific classification
- Kingdom: Animalia
- Phylum: Arthropoda
- Class: Insecta
- Order: Diptera
- Suborder: Brachycera
- Infraorder: Tabanomorpha

Families
- †Alinkidae—extinct (Triassic); Athericidae—ibis flies; Austroleptidae; Bolbomyiidae; †Eostratiomyiidae—extinct (Middle Jurassic); Oreoleptidae; Pelecorhynchidae; Rhagionidae—snipe flies; Tabanidae—horse and deer flies

= Tabanomorpha =

Infraorder of insects

The Brachyceran infraorder Tabanomorpha is a small group that consists primarily of two large families, the Tabanidae (horse and deer flies) and Rhagionidae (snipe flies), and an assortment of very small affiliated families, most of which have been (or could be, or sometimes are) included within the Rhagionidae.

== Description ==
Adult Tabanomorpha typically have a convex face and antenna bearing styli. The forewing has a costa along its entire perimeter (though its posterior portion may be weaker), while the tarsi have pulvilliform empodia. Males have eyes that are nearly or fully holoptic and have an endoaedeagal process which is usually quite long and distinct. Females have the cercus always flattened.

Larval Tabanomorpha have a retractable head capsule and a brush of setae just under the fold of the integument.

== Ecology ==
Adults of most species feed on nectar and pollen, but blood-feeding (hematophagy) occurs in the majority of female Tabanidae, some Rhagionidae and an Athericidae. Blood-feeding is believed to have evolved multiple times within the group.

Larvae are mostly predators in terrestrial, aquatic or semi-aquatic habitats.

== Classification ==
The infraorder Vermileonomorpha is often included within the Tabanomorpha, though the most recent classifications place them as its sister taxon. There are also some classifications that place the Nemestrinoidea within the Tabanomorpha, though this is not widely accepted. There are two superfamily-level lineages currently recognized within Tabanomorpha; the Tabanoidea and the Rhagionoidea (the latter comprising Austroleptidae, Bolbomyiidae, and Rhagionidae).
