= Glutops =

Scientific classification
- Kingdom: Animalia
- Phylum: Arthropoda
- Class: Insecta
- Order: Diptera
- Family: Pelecorhynchidae
- Genus: Glutops; Burgess, 1878

Synonyms
- Tamayura Nagatomi, 1955

Genus of flies

Glutops is a genus of flies in the family Pelecorhynchidae.

== Species ==
- Glutops bandus Teskey, 1970
- Glutops compactus Teskey, 1970
- Glutops esakii Nagatomi & Saigusa, 1970
- Glutops itoi (Nagatomi, 1955)
- Glutops medius Teskey, 1970
- Glutops melanderi Teskey, 1970
- Glutops punctatus Wirth, 1954
- Glutops rossi Pechuman, 1945
- Glutops semicanus Krivosheina, 1971
- Glutops semiformis Nagatomi & Saigusa, 1970
- Glutops singularis Burgess, 1878
