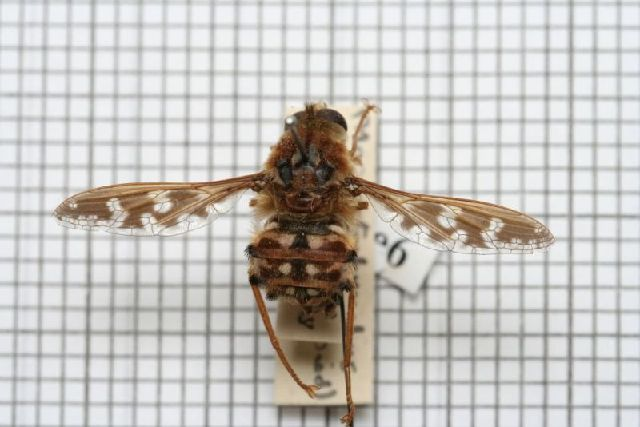
- Moegistorhynchus longirostris

Scientific classification
- Kingdom: Animalia
- Phylum: Arthropoda
- Clade: Pancrustacea
- Class: Insecta
- Order: Diptera
- Family: Nemestrinidae
- Genus: Moegistorhynchus; Macquart, 1841

= Moegistorhynchus =

Genus of flies

Moegistorhynchus is a genus of tangle-veined flies in the family Nemestrinidae. It was described in 1840 by Pierre-Justin-Marie Macquart.

== Species ==
This genus has at least 6 species, 4 are described.

- Moegistorynchus braunsi Bequaert, 1935
- Moegistorynchus brevirostris (Wiedemann, 1821)
- Moegistorhynchus longirostris (Wiedemann, 1819)
- Moegistorhynchus perplexus Bequaert, 1935
