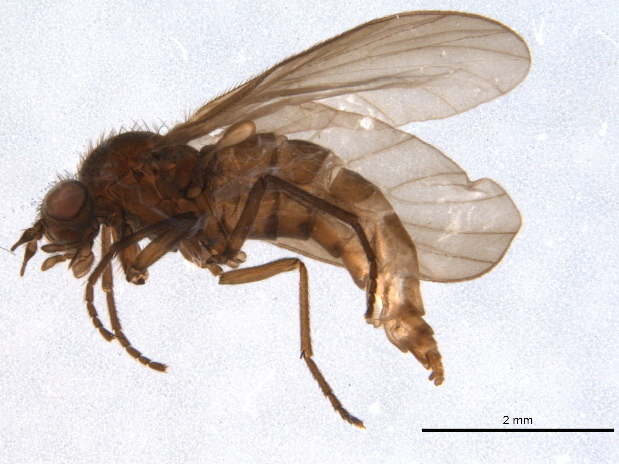
- Bolbomyia wuorentausi

Scientific classification
- Kingdom: Animalia
- Phylum: Arthropoda
- Class: Insecta
- Order: Diptera
- Suborder: Brachycera
- Infraorder: Tabanomorpha
- Superfamily: Rhagionoidea
- Family: Bolbomyiidae; Stuckenberg, 2001
- Genus: Bolbomyia; Loew, 1850

Type species
- Bolbomyia nana Loew, 1862

Species
- See text

Synonyms
- Misgomyia Coquillett, 1908; Cekendia Szilády, 1934

= Bolbomyia =

Genus of flies

Bolbomyia is a genus of snipe flies, and the sole genus in the family Bolbomyiidae; until 2010, it was placed in the family Rhagionidae. They are a small 2 to 3.5 mm, brown or black in color, with lightly infuscate (darkened) wings. They are restricted to the north temperate region of North America, Japan and Russian Far East (Kamchatka).

== Species ==
- †B. loewi Meunier, 1902 - fossil Baltic
- B. melanderi Chillcott, 1963 - Nearctic
- B. nana Loew, 1862 - Nearctic
- B. wuorentausi (Szilády, 1934) - Nearctic
