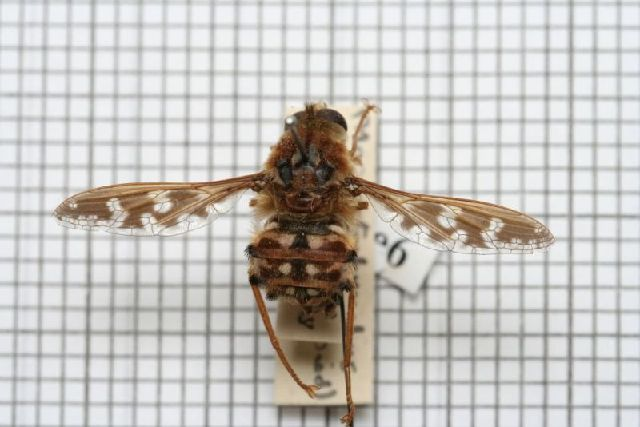

Scientific classification
- Kingdom: Animalia
- Phylum: Arthropoda
- Class: Insecta
- Order: Diptera
- Family: Nemestrinidae
- Genus: Moegistorhynchus
- Species: M. longirostris

Binomial name
- Moegistorhynchus longirostris (Wiedemann, 1819)
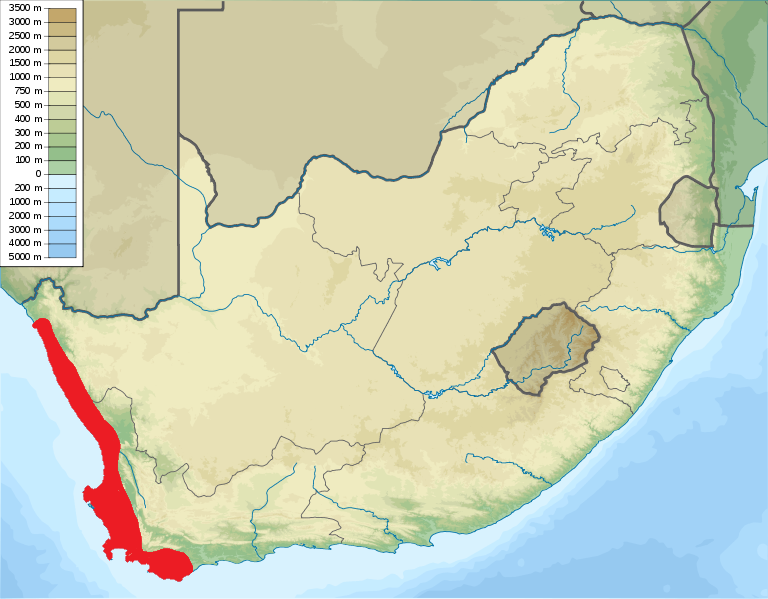

= Moegistorhynchus longirostris =

Species of fly

Moegistorhynchus longirostris is a keystone species of fly that lives on the west coast of South Africa.

== Anatomy ==
M. longirostris has a very long proboscis that is believed to be the product of an evolutionary arms race between pollinating insects and long-tubed flowers.

== Ecology ==
The species pollinates, partly or exclusively, at least 20 species of Iridaceae (such as Lapeirousia anceps), Geraniaceae, and Orchidaceae.
