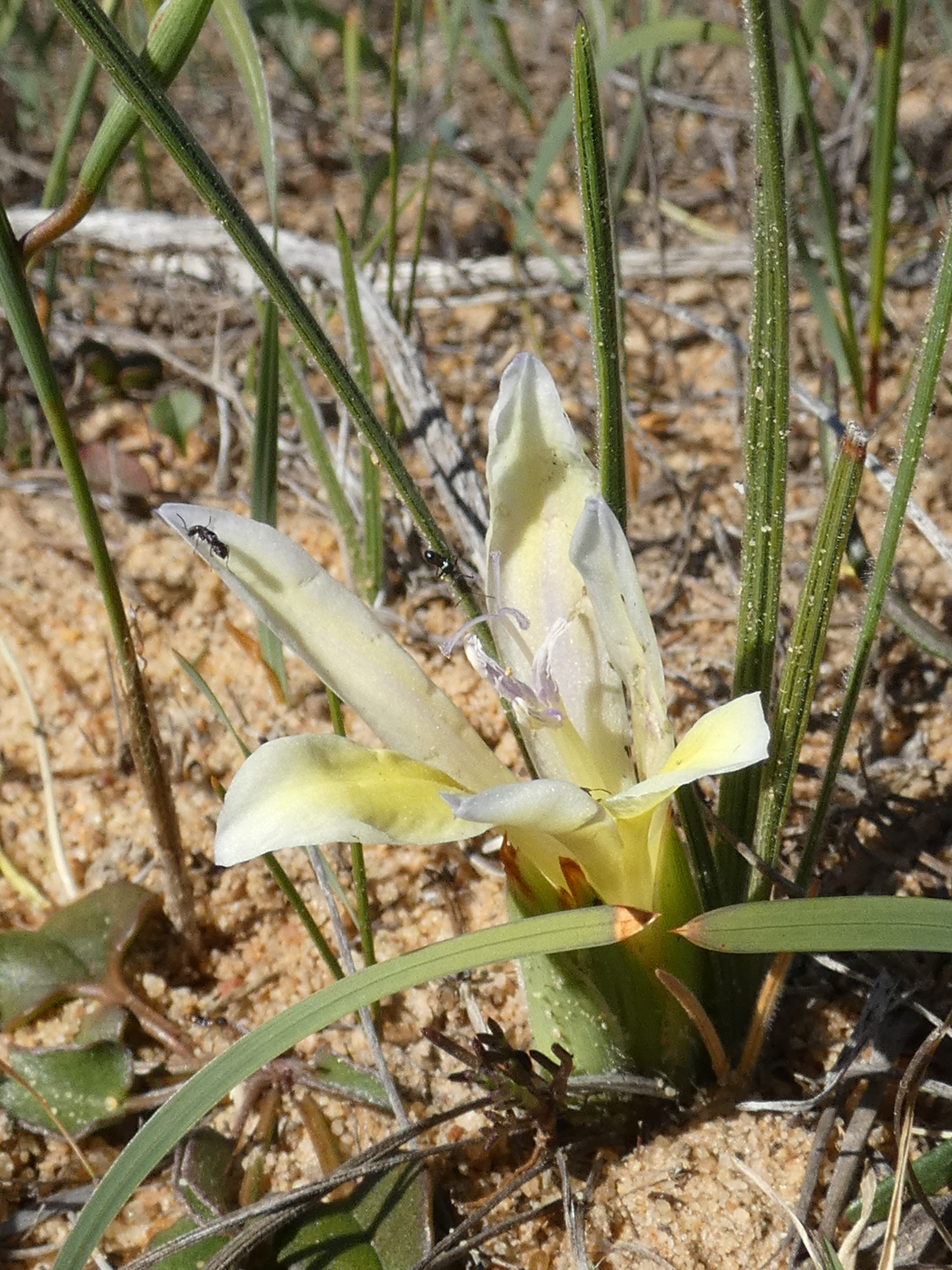

Scientific classification
- Kingdom: Plantae
- Clade: Embryophytes
- Clade: Tracheophytes
- Clade: Spermatophytes
- Clade: Angiosperms
- Clade: Monocots
- Order: Asparagales
- Family: Iridaceae
- Genus: Babiana
- Species: B. vanzijliae

Binomial name
- Babiana vanzijliae L.Bolus

= Babiana vanzijliae =

Species of flowering plant

Babiana vanzijliae is a species of geophyte of 4–12 cm (1.6–4.7 in) high that is assigned to the family Iridaceae. It has leaves that consist of a sheath and a blade that are at an angle with each other. The leaf blades are narrow, sword- to lance-shaped and have a left and right surface, rather than an upper and lower surface. The leaf blades are pleated and covered in velvety hairs. The inflorescence contains three to five pale bluish mauve to yellow flowers, but the lower lateral tepals are yellow becoming pale around the edges, and with three stamens crowding under the upper lip. Flowering occurs from early August to the middle of September. The flowers emit a strong scent. B. vanzijliae grows along the Bokkeveld Escarpment near Nieuwoudtville in the Northern Cape province of South Africa.

== Description ==
Babiana vanzijliae is a geophytic perennial plant of 4–12 cm (1.6–4.7 in) high. Most of its velvety stem can be found underground but some of it is above the surface and it can be branched at ground level. The base of the stem is encircled by a thick collar of fibres that is visible at the surface of the soil. The leaves consist of a sheath that encloses the sheaths of higher leaves and of a blade that is at an angle to the sheath. The leaf blade is upright or sickle-shaped, velvety hairy, laterally compressed, meaning it has a right and left, rather than an upper and lower side, and its surface is not flat but pleated, meaning that the surfaces of the leaf abruptly and repetitively change angle at the location of one of the veins. The outline of the leaf blade is sword- to narrowly lance-shaped. The leaf blades are not coiled, their margins do not undulate, and their tips are pointy and do not end in several irregular teeth.

The decumbent inflorescence consists of three to five upright mirror-symmetrical flowers, each of which is subtended by two bracts of 25–40 mm (0.98–1.57 in) long, green at their base but becoming dry at the tips, the outer bract slightly longer compared to the inner. The inner bract is forked only at the tip, which is different from many other species that have more deeply forked inner bracts or inner bracts that are split entirely to the base. The flowers are pale to clear yellow, sometimes flushed with or mostly pale mauve-blue and are produce an intense scent. The flower has a narrowly funnel-shaped perianth tube of 25–50 mm (0.98–1.97 in) long or sometimes as short as 18 mm (0.71 in), and splits into six tepals. The dorsal tepal arches over anthers and style and is 30–38 mm (1.2–1.5 in) long. The three lower tepals are 25–30 mm (0.98–1.18 in) long, and are merged over a short distance, forming a lower lip that provides a landing platform for visiting insects. The lower lateral tepals are yellow but pale around the edges. The three filaments are crowding at the side of the dorsal tepal, 15–17 mm (0.59–0.67 in) long, and topped by anthers of 7–8 mm (0.28–0.31 in) long. The inferior ovary is smooth or sometimes has short, bristly hairs on the ribs only. The style arches over the stamens and divides in three branches opposite the tips of the anthers, the branches being about 4 mm (0.16 in) long. Flowering occurs from early August to the middle of September.

== Taxonomy ==
As far as known, Babiana vanzijliae was first collected for science in 1897 south of Nieuwoudtville and labeled B. sulphurea, but no description was published. Even if that name would have been validly published, the name is not available because Gladiolus sulphureus that was illustrated in a book by Nikolaus Joseph von Jacquin in 1793 was identified as a species of Babiana by John Bellenden Ker Gawler in 1804. Van Jacquin's publication lacks the details to establish which species was illustrated, although it is clearly not B. vanzijliae. B. vanzijliae was first described by Louisa Bolus in 1925, based on some specimens that had been collected in the previous year by Dorothy Constantia van Zijl, and named in her honor. In 1959, Gwendoline Joyce Lewis misspelled the name of the species as B. vanzyliae in her revision of the genus.

== Distribution, ecology and conservation ==
Babiana vanzijliae can be found on the high plateau bordering the escarpment between somewhat north of the Nieuwoudtville Pass and Papkuilsfontein Farm in the south, and about 15 km (9.3 mi) inland from the escarpment. Here it grows both in renosterveld and fynbos, on tillite-derived soils and rocky sandstone. It is considered a near-threatened species, because its distribution range is less than 600 km^{2} (230 mi^{2}), within which it occurs in ten to fifteen locations, and its population is declining as its habitat is reclaimed for the cultivation of rooibos and wheat, but the species is still fairly common.
