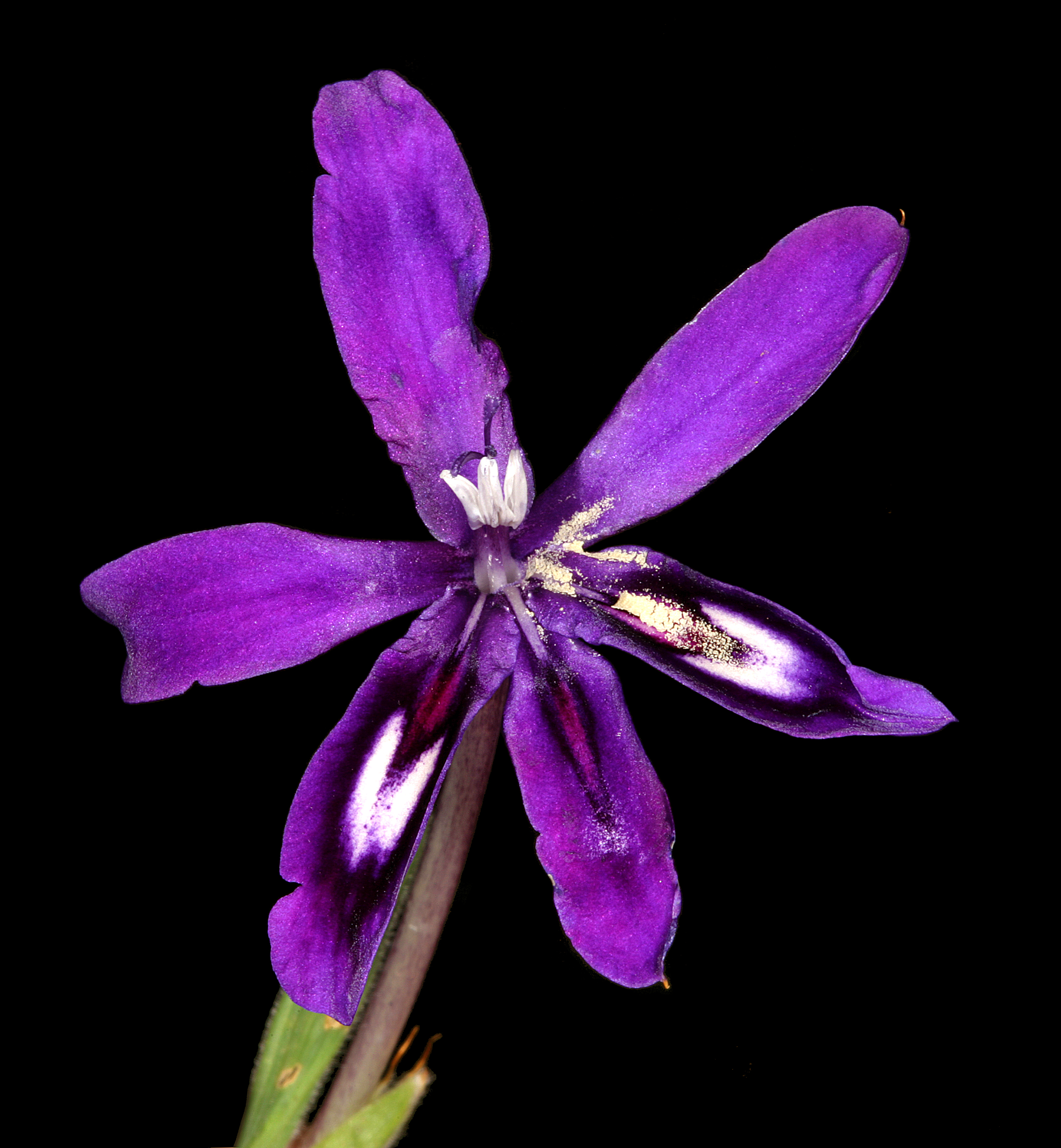

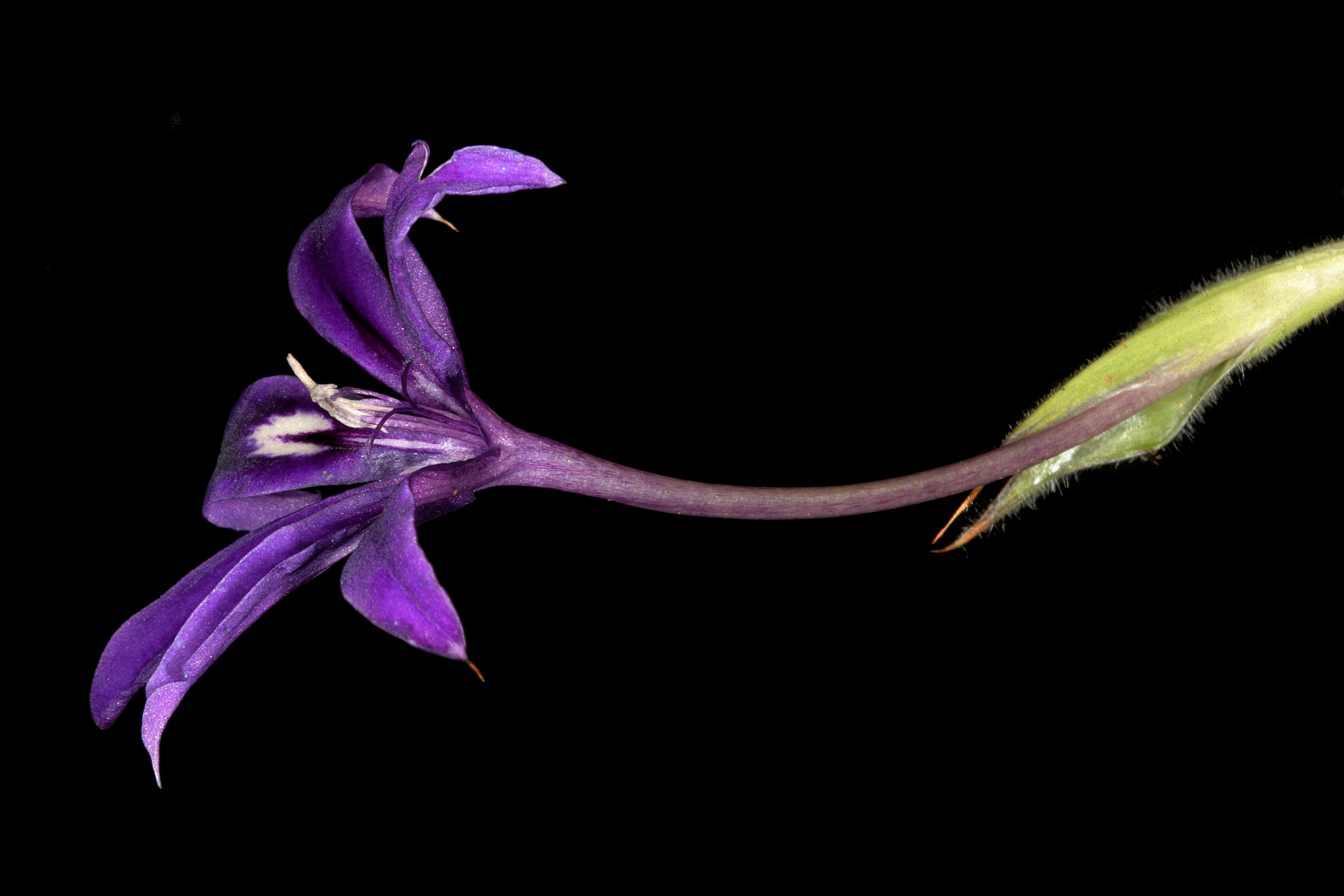

Scientific classification
- Kingdom: Plantae
- Clade: Tracheophytes
- Clade: Angiosperms
- Clade: Monocots
- Order: Asparagales
- Family: Iridaceae
- Genus: Babiana
- Species: B. framesii

Binomial name
- Babiana framesii (L.Bolus)

= Babiana framesii =

Species of flowering plant

Babiana framesii is a perennial flowering plant and geophyte belonging to the genus Babiana and is part of the fynbos. The species is endemic to the Northern Cape. It occurs on the Bokkeveldberge plateau near Nieuwoudtville and has a range of less than 100 km^{2}. The species is considered rare.
