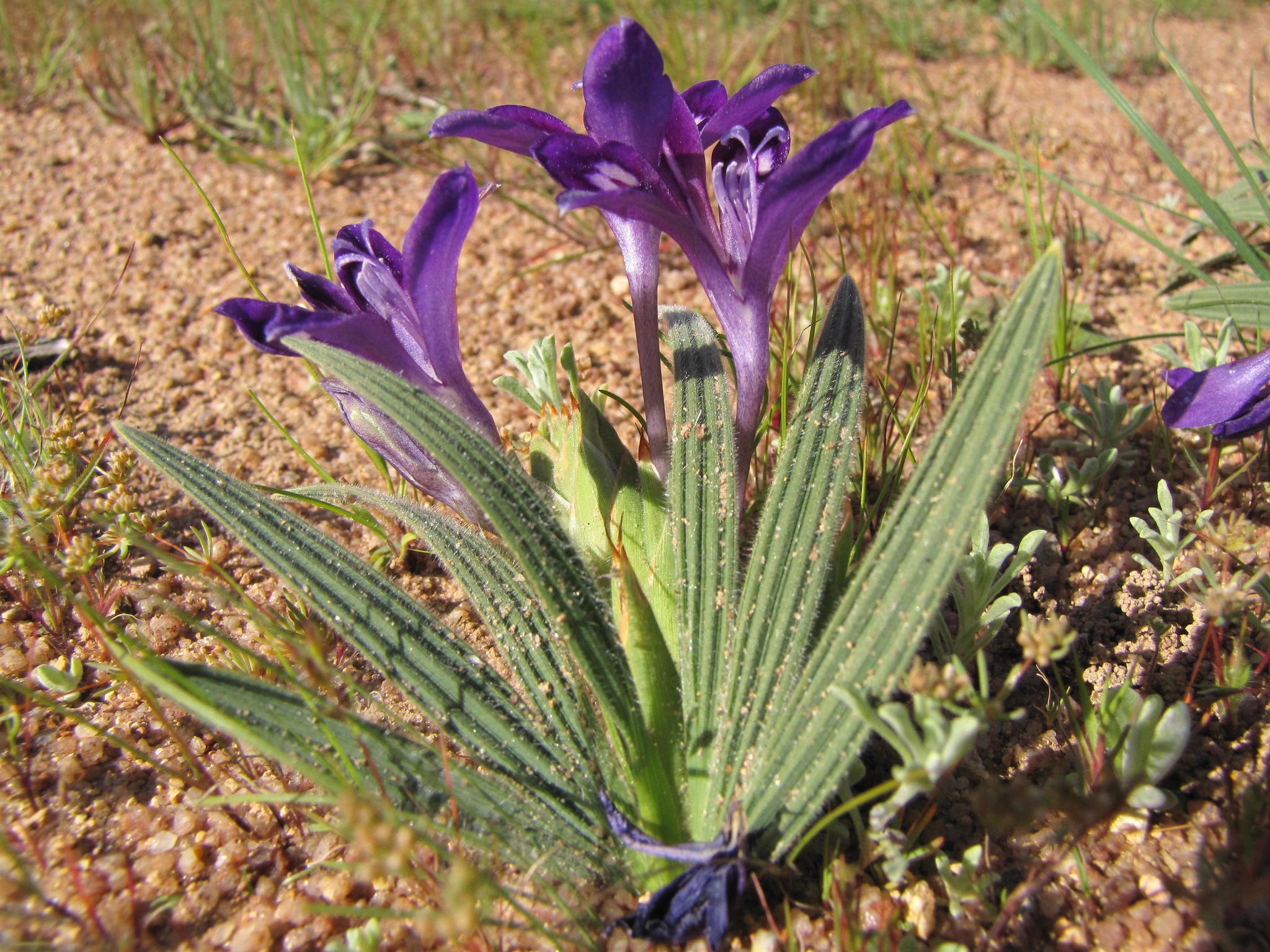

Scientific classification
- Kingdom: Plantae
- Clade: Tracheophytes
- Clade: Angiosperms
- Clade: Monocots
- Order: Asparagales
- Family: Iridaceae
- Genus: Babiana
- Species: B. curviscapa

Binomial name
- Babiana curviscapa G.J.Lewis

= Babiana curviscapa =

Species of flowering plant

Babiana curviscapa is a perennial flowering plant and geophyte belonging to the genus Babiana. The species is endemic to the Northern Cape and is part of the Succulent Karoo. It occurs from Steinkopf southwards to Kamiesberge and the hills west of Bitterfontein.
