= Babiana lapeirousioides =

Scientific classification
- Kingdom: Plantae
- Clade: Tracheophytes
- Clade: Angiosperms
- Clade: Monocots
- Order: Asparagales
- Family: Iridaceae
- Genus: Babiana
- Species: B. lapeirousioides

Binomial name
- Babiana lapeirousioides Goldblatt & J.C.Manning

Species of flowering plant

Babiana lapeirousioides is a species of geophytic, perennial flowering plant in the family Iridaceae. The species is endemic to the Northern Cape and occurs in Namaqualand, east of Kamieskroon where it is part of the Succulent Karoo.
