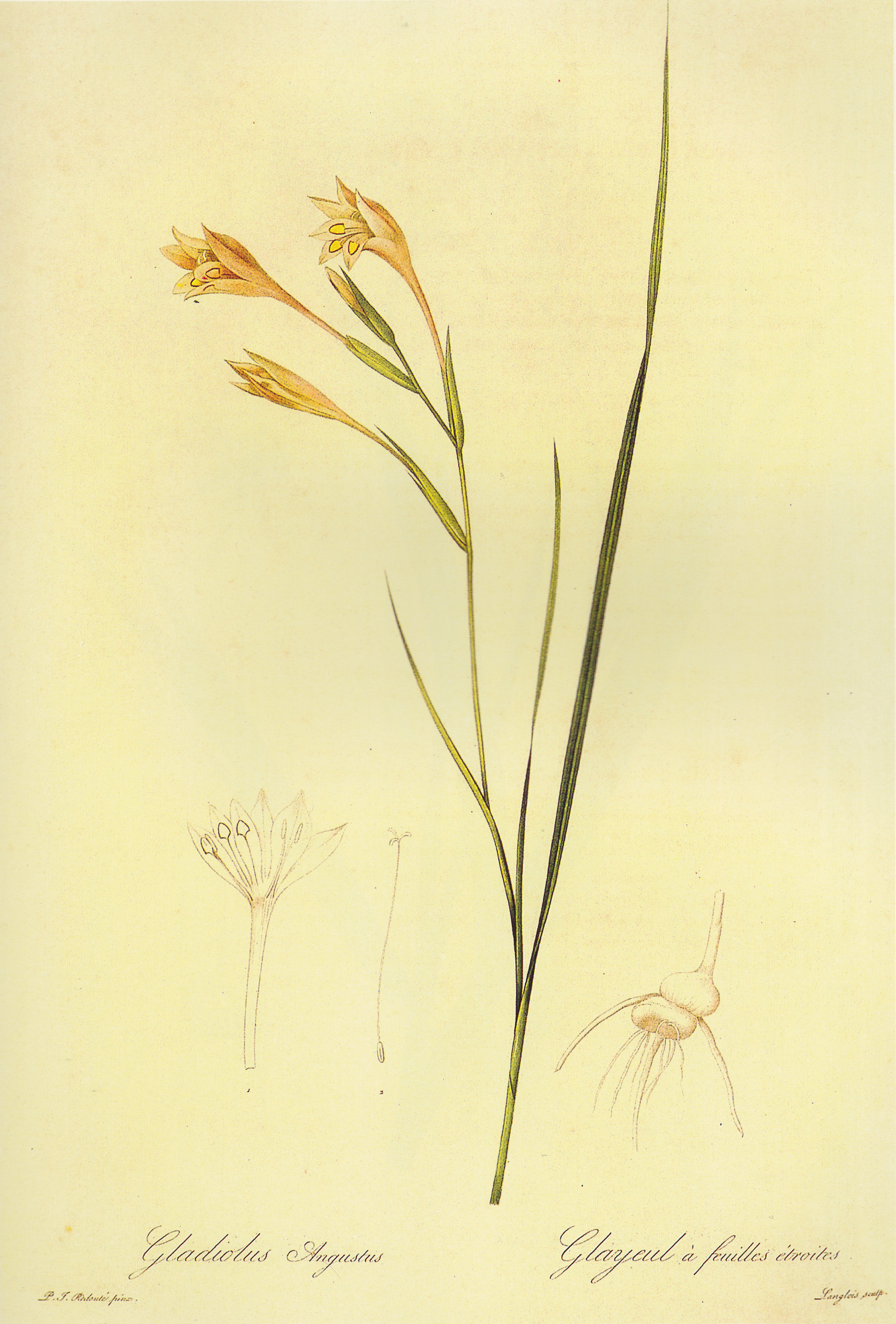

Scientific classification
- Kingdom: Plantae
- Clade: Tracheophytes
- Clade: Angiosperms
- Clade: Monocots
- Order: Asparagales
- Family: Iridaceae
- Genus: Gladiolus
- Species: G. angustus

Binomial name
- Gladiolus angustus L.

= Gladiolus angustus =

Species of flowering plant

Gladiolus angustus is a species of gladiolus known by the common name long-tubed painted lady. It is native to the Cape Provinces of South Africa.

This flower is an herb growing from a papery corm and reaching 30 to 60 centimeters in height. It has basal sword-shaped leaves with prominent midveins. Each scape has two or three flowers with lance-shaped bracts. The funnel-shaped flowers are white or cream, sometimes tinted with pink. It usually blooms from spring to early summer, from October to November. The fruit often do not develop. This plant is native to South Africa but has become invasive elsewhere and naturalized in many places, especially Australia.

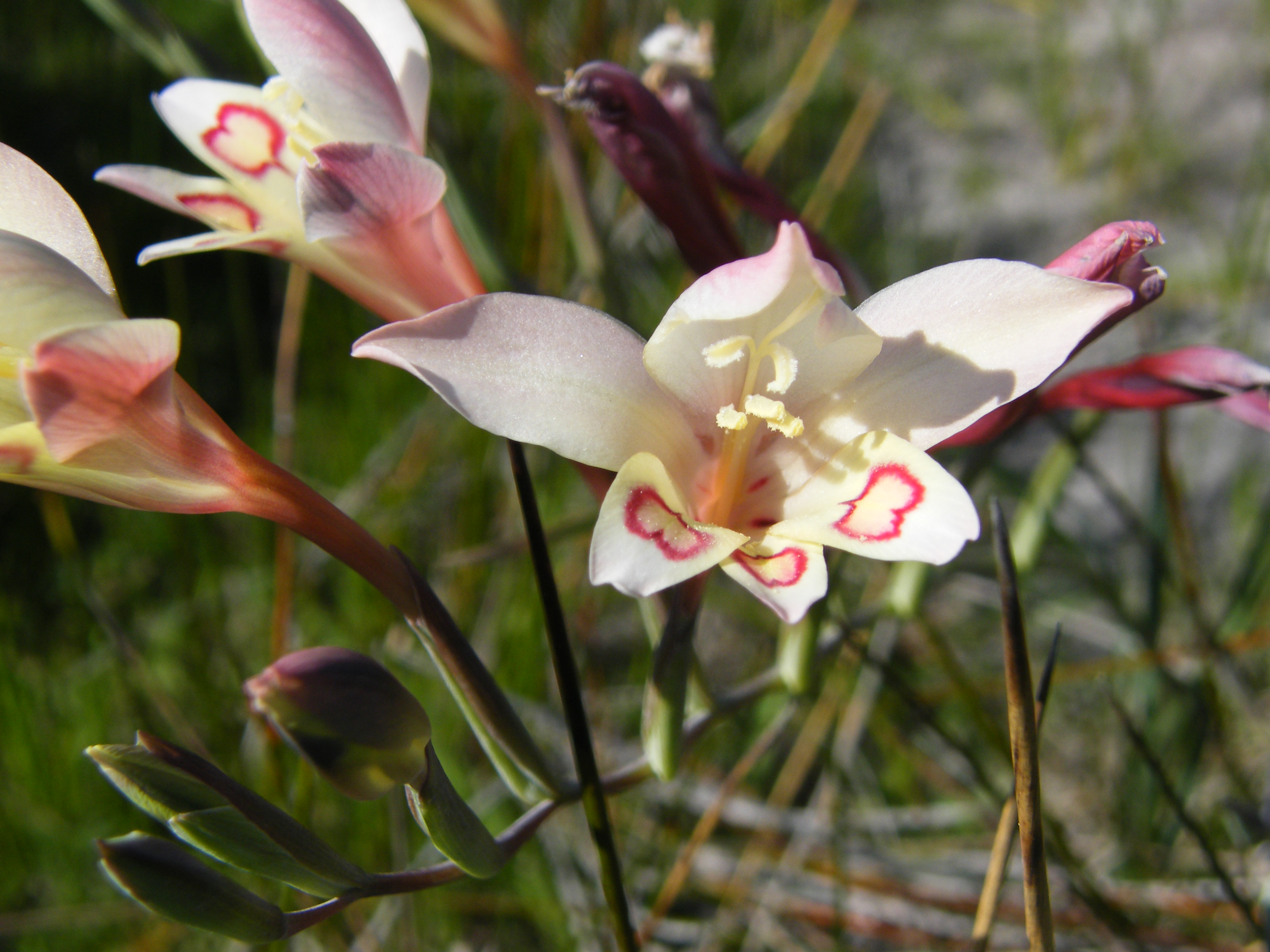
A close-up of Gladiolus angustus in flower.

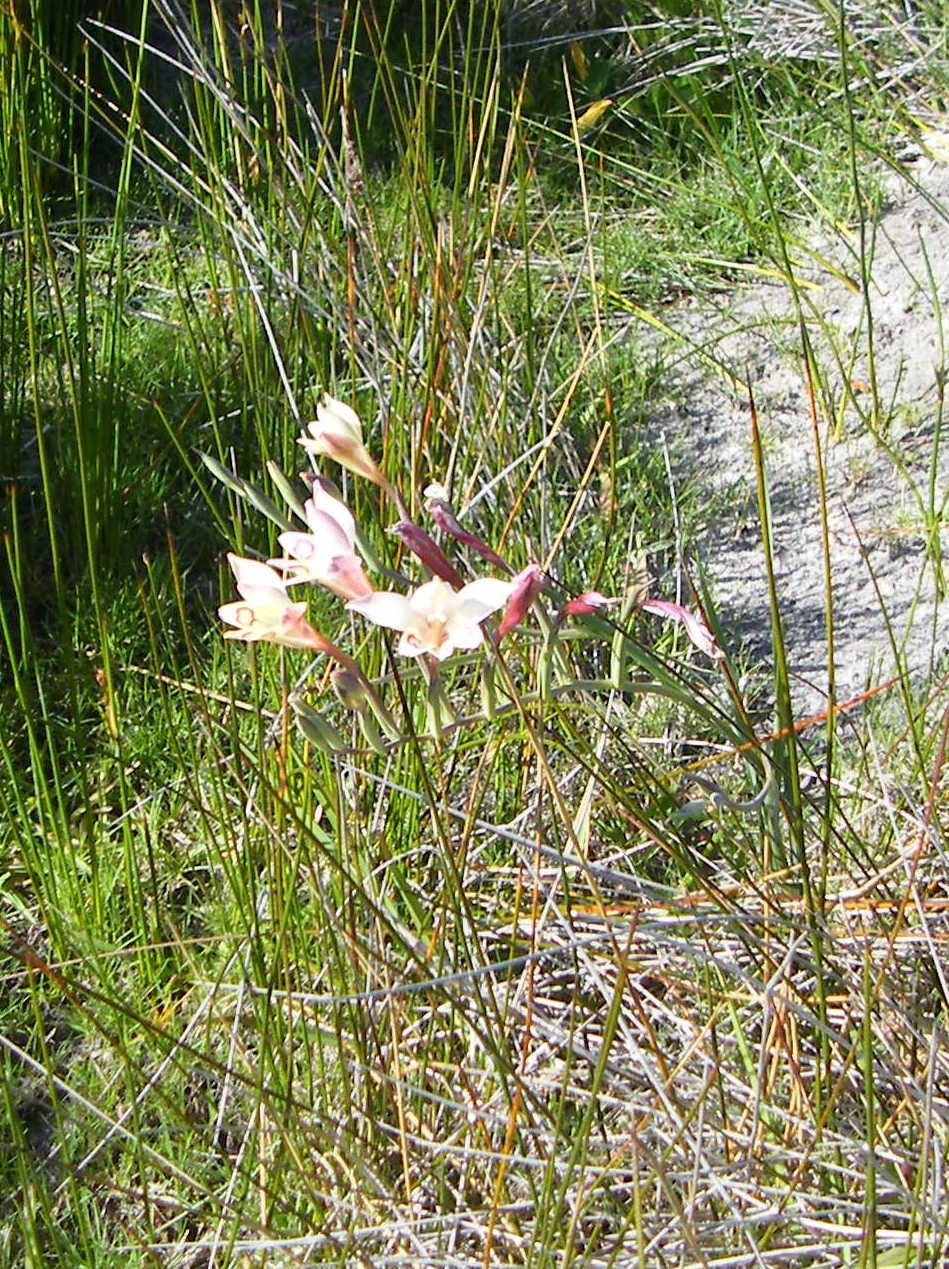
An image showing Gladiolus angustus in its natural habitat.
