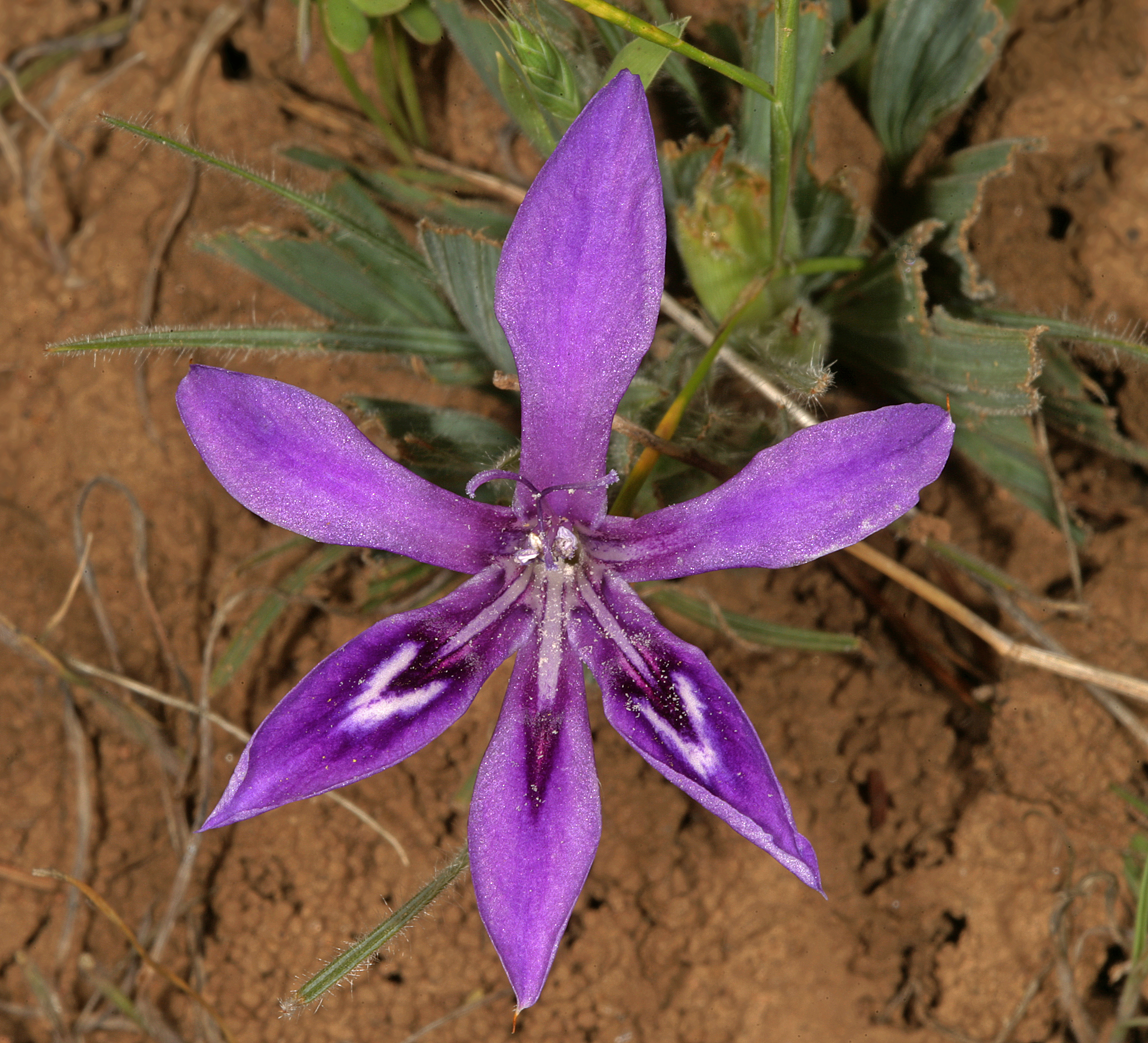

Scientific classification
- Kingdom: Plantae
- Clade: Tracheophytes
- Clade: Angiosperms
- Clade: Monocots
- Order: Asparagales
- Family: Iridaceae
- Genus: Babiana
- Species: B. flabellifolia

Binomial name
- Babiana flabellifolia Harv. ex Klatt

= Babiana flabellifolia =

Species of flowering plant

Babiana flabellifolia is a perennial flowering plant and geophyte belonging to the genus Babiana. The species is endemic to the Northern Cape and the Western Cape.
