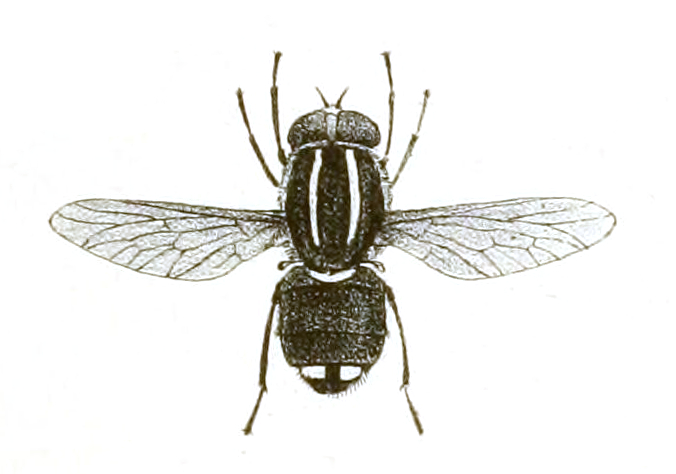
- Pelecorhynchus darwini (female)

Scientific classification
- Kingdom: Animalia
- Phylum: Arthropoda
- Clade: Pancrustacea
- Class: Insecta
- Order: Diptera
- Infraorder: Tabanomorpha
- Superfamily: Tabanoidea
- Family: Pelecorhynchidae; Enderlein, 1922

Genera
- Pelecorhynchus Macquart, 1850; Glutops Burgess, 1878; Pseudoerinna Shiraki, 1932

= Pelecorhynchidae =

Family of flies

Pelecorhynchidae is a small family of flies. All of the genera were originally placed in the family Rhagionidae, and their elevation to family rank has been controversial. Other phylogenetic analyses have supported Pelecorhynchidae as a distinct clade from Rhagionidae. The adults of Pelecorhynchus mostly feed on nectar of Leptospermum flowers. Larvae have been collected in the damp margins of swamp areas, where they feed on earthworms.

== Distribution ==
The genus Pelecorhynchus is known from Australia and Chile. The genera Glutops and Pseudoerinna are distributed in the Nearctic and eastern Palaearctic.
