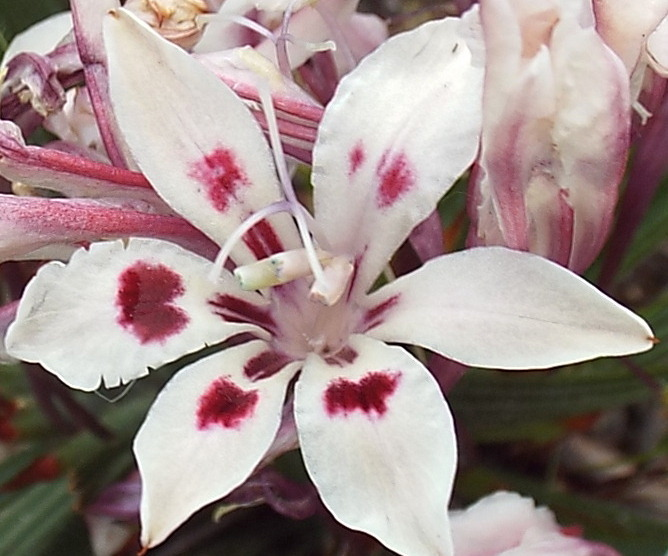

Scientific classification
- Kingdom: Plantae
- Clade: Tracheophytes
- Clade: Angiosperms
- Clade: Monocots
- Order: Asparagales
- Family: Iridaceae
- Genus: Babiana
- Species: B. tubulosa

Binomial name
- Babiana tubulosa (Burm.f.) Ker Gawl., (1827)

Synonyms
- Babiana tubata (Jacq.) Sweet; Babiana tubulosa var. tubata (Jacq.) Ker Gawl.; Gladiolus longiflorus Andrews; Gladiolus tubatus Jacq.; Ixia tubulosa Burm.f.

= Babiana tubulosa =

Species of flowering plant

Babiana tubulosa is a perennial flowering plant and geophyte belonging to the genus Babiana. The species is endemic to the Western Cape and occurs from Vredenburg to Mamre where it is part of the fynbos. The species has a range of less than 1 566 km² and there are twenty subpopulations. The remaining subpopulations are threatened by development on the Vredenburg Peninsula, especially at Dwarskersbos, St. Helena Bay, Saldanha, Jacobsbaai and Langebaan. Around Mamre and Darling the plant has lost its habitat to crop cultivation.
