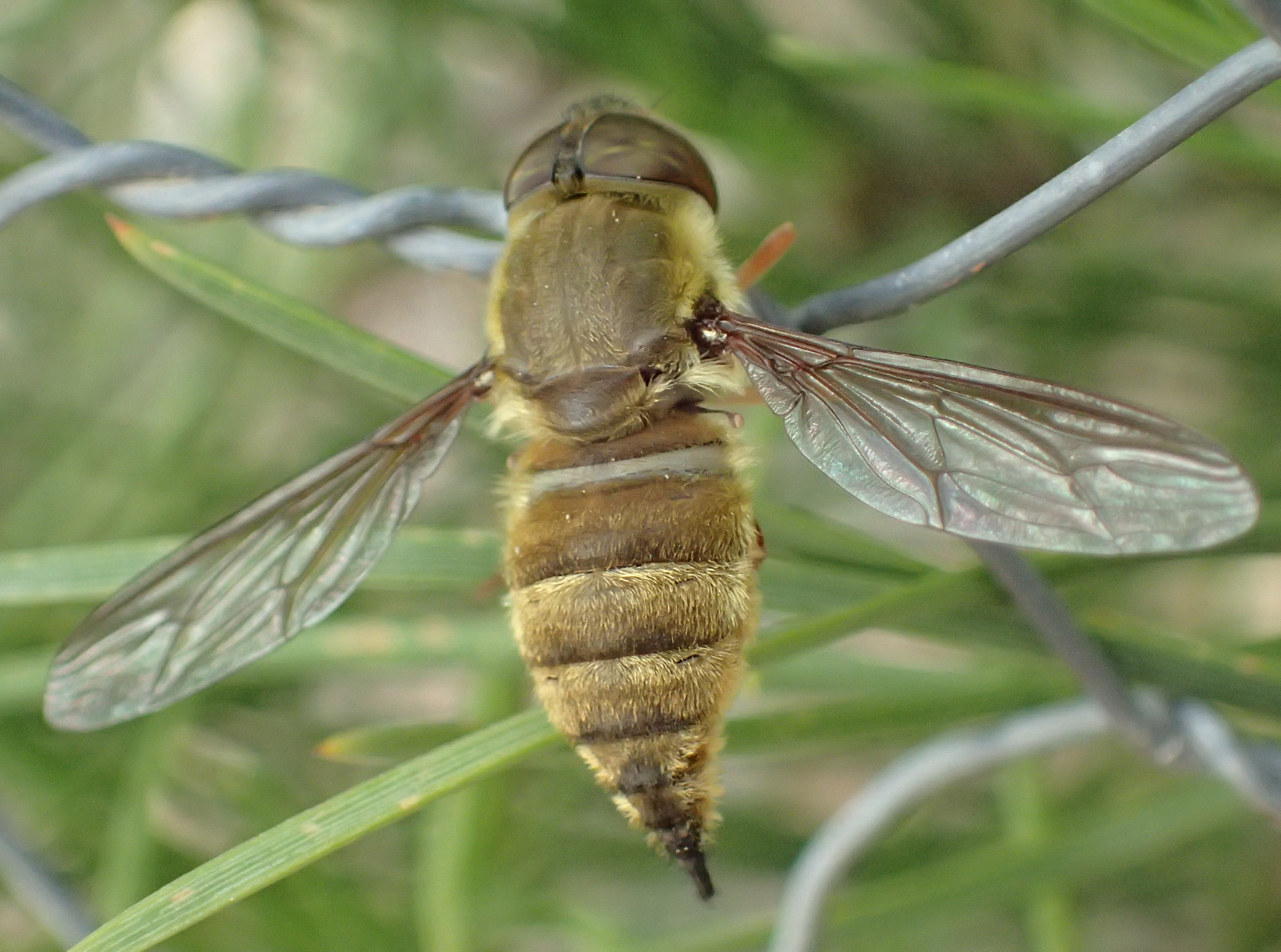
- Hirmoneura obscura

Scientific classification
- Kingdom: Animalia
- Phylum: Arthropoda
- Clade: Pancrustacea
- Class: Insecta
- Superorder: Panorpida
- Clade: Antliophora
- Order: Diptera
- Suborder: Brachycera
- Superfamily: Nemestrinoidea
- Family: Nemestrinidae; Griffith & Pidgeon, 1832

Subfamilies
- †Archinemestriinae; Hirmoneurinae; Nemestrininae; Trichopsideinae

= Nemestrinidae =

Nemestrinidae Temporal range: Callovian–Present

Family of flies

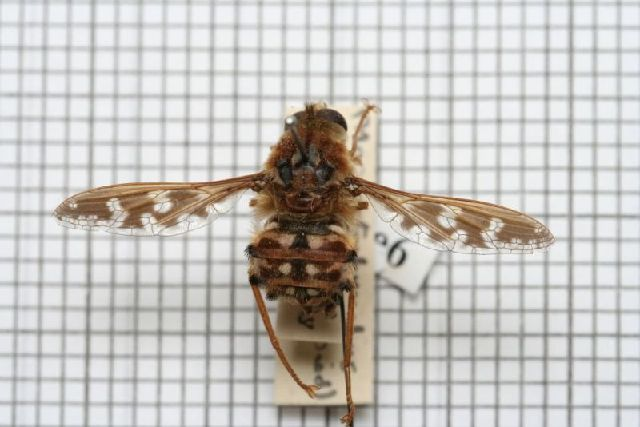
Moegistorhynchus longirostris

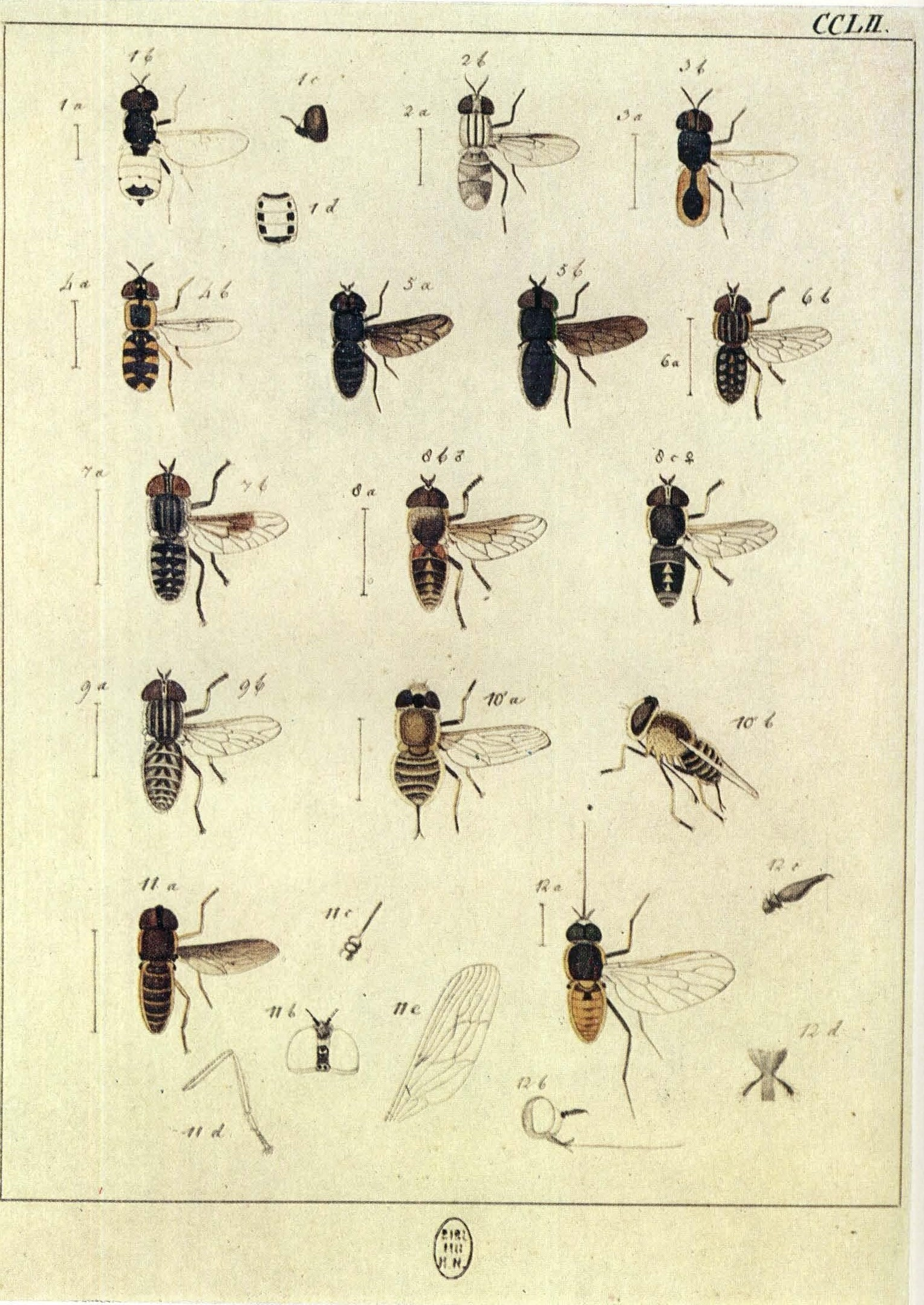
Neorhynchocephalus tauscheri (10) and Hirmoneura obscura (11) in Europäischen Zweiflügeligen

Nemestrinidae, or tangle-veined flies is a family of flies in the superfamily Nemestrinoidea, closely related to Acroceridae.

Larvae are endoparasitoids of either grasshoppers (Trichopsideinae) or scarab beetles (Hirmoneurinae). Some are considered important in the control of grasshopper populations. Adults are often observed on flowers.

== Distribution ==
The family is small but distributed worldwide, with about 300 species in 34 genera. Nemestrinidae are most diverse in the southern hemisphere, and only six species in three genera occur in the Nearctic region.

== Genera ==
- Atriadops^{c g}
- Ceyloniola^{c g}
- Cyclopsidea^{c g}
- Fallenia^{c g}
- Hirmoneura^{i c g}
- Hyrmophlaeba Rondani, 1864^{g b}
- Moegistorhynchus^{c g}
- Nemestrinus^{c g}
- Neohirmoneura^{b}
- Neorhynchocephalus Lichtwardt, 1909^{i c g b}
- Nycterimorpha^{c g}
- Nycterimyia^{c g}
- Prosoeca^{c g}
- Stenobasipteron^{c g}
- Stenopteromyia^{c g}
- Trichophthalma^{c g}
- Trichopsidea Westwood, 1839^{c g b}

Data sources: i = ITIS, c = Catalogue of Life, g = GBIF, b = Bugguide.net

== Fossil history ==
Fossils of Nemestrinidae are known from several localities of various ages in Russia, Kazakhstan, Mongolia, Western Europe and North America, with the oldest described fossils being in the Middle-Upper Jurassic Karabastau Formation of Kazakhstan and Daohugou Bed of China. Undescribed remains are known from the Upper Liassic of Germany.

- †subfamily Archinemestriinae Rohdendorf 1968
  - †Aenigmestrinus Mostovski 1998 Karabastau Formation, Kazakhstan, Callovian/Oxfordian
  - †Archinemestrius Rohdendorf 1968 Karabastau Formation, Kazakhstan, Callovian/Oxfordian
  - †Mesonemestrius Zhang et al. 2017 Burmese amber, Myanmar, Cenomanian
  - †Protonemestrius Rohdendorf 1968 Karabastau Formation, Kazakhstan, Callovian/Oxfordian Yixian Formation, China, Aptian
- †Ahirmoneura Zhang et al. 2008 Daohugou, China, Callovian
- †Florinemestrius Ren, 1998^{g}
- †Prohirmoneura Handlirsch, 1906
- †Rhagionemestrius Usachev, 1968
- †Sinonemestrius
