= List of Iridaceae of South Africa =

List of flowering plants in the family Iridaceae recorded from South Africa

Iridaceae is a family of monocotyledonous flowering plants (anthophytes) in the order Asparagales, the asparagoid lilies. The family takes its name from the irises, meaning rainbow, referring to its many colours. There are 66 accepted genera with a total of c. 2244 species worldwide. It includes a number of other well known cultivated plants, such as freesias, gladioli and crocuses. Members of this family are perennial plants, with a bulb, corm or rhizome. The plants grow erect, and have leaves that are generally grass-like, with a sharp central fold.

23,420 species of vascular plant have been recorded in South Africa, making it the sixth most species-rich country in the world and the most species-rich country on the African continent. Of these, 153 species are considered to be threatened. Nine biomes have been described in South Africa: Fynbos, Succulent Karoo, desert, Nama Karoo, grassland, savanna, Albany thickets, the Indian Ocean coastal belt, and forests.

The 2018 South African National Biodiversity Institute's National Biodiversity Assessment plant checklist lists 35,130 taxa in the phyla Anthocerotophyta (hornworts (6)), Anthophyta (flowering plants (33534)), Bryophyta (mosses (685)), Cycadophyta (cycads (42)), Lycopodiophyta (Lycophytes(45)), Marchantiophyta (liverworts (376)), Pinophyta (conifers (33)), and Pteridophyta (cryptogams (408)).

65 genera are represented in the literature. Listed taxa include species, subspecies, varieties, and forms as recorded, some of which have subsequently been allocated to other taxa as synonyms, in which cases the accepted taxon is appended to the listing. Multiple entries under alternative names reflect taxonomic revision over time.

== Acidanthera ==
Genus Acidanthera:

- Acidanthera capensis (Houtt.) Baker. accepted as Ixia paniculata D.Delaroch. indigenous

== Afrosolen ==
Genus Afrosolen:

- Afrosolen bainesii (Baker) Goldblatt & J.C.Mannin. indigenous
- Afrosolen masukuensis (Vaupel & Schltr.) Goldblatt & J.C.Mannin. indigenous
- Afrosolen sandersonii (Baker) Goldblatt & J.C.Mannin. indigenous
  - Afrosolen sandersonii (Baker) Goldblatt & J.C.Manning subsp. limpopoensis (Goldblatt & J.C.Manning. endemic
  - Afrosolen sandersonii (Baker) Goldblatt & J.C.Manning subsp. sandersoni. indigenous

== Agretta ==
Genus Agretta:

- Agretta crispa Eckl. accepted as Ixia erubescens Goldblat. indigenous
- Agretta pallidiflavens Eckl. accepted as Ixia odorata Ker Gawl. indigenous
- Agretta pentandra (L.f.) Eckl. accepted as Ixia scillaris L. subsp. scillari. indigenous
- Agretta stricta Eckl. accepted as Ixia stricta (Eckl. ex Klatt) G.J.Lewi. indigenous

== Anisanthus ==
Genus Anisanthus:

- Anisanthus caryophyllaceus (Burm.f.) Klatt, accepted as Freesia caryophyllacea (Burm.f.) N.E.Br.

== Anomatheca ==
Genus Anomatheca:

- Anomatheca cruenta Lindl, accepted as Freesia laxa (Thunb.) Goldblatt & J.C.Manning subsp. laxa
- Anomatheca fistulosa (Spreng. ex Klatt) Goldblatt, accepted as Xenoscapa fistulosa (Spreng. ex Klatt) Goldblatt & J.C.Manning
- Anomatheca grandiflora Baker, accepted as Freesia grandiflora (Baker) Klatt subsp. grandiflora
- Anomatheca laxa (Thunb.) Goldblatt subsp. azurea Goldblatt & Hutchings, accepted as Freesia laxa (Thunb.) Goldblatt & J.C.Manning subsp. azurea (Goldblatt & Hutchings) Goldblatt & J.C.
- Anomatheca verrucosa (B.Vogel) Goldblatt, accepted as Freesia verrucosa (B.Vogel) Goldblatt & J.C.Manning
- Anomatheca viridis (Aiton) Goldblatt subsp. crispifolia Goldblatt, accepted as Freesia viridis (Aiton) Goldblatt & J.C.Manning subsp. viridis

== Antholyza ==
Genus Antholyza:

- Antholyza caryophyllaceae (Burm.f.) Roem. & Schult, accepted as Freesia caryophyllacea (Burm.f.) N.E.Br.
- Antholyza fourcadei L.Bolus, accepted as Gladiolus fourcadei (L.Bolus) Goldblatt & M.P.de Vos

== Aristea ==
Genus Aristea:

- Aristea abyssinica Pax, indigenous
- Aristea africana (L.) Hoffmanns, endemic
- Aristea anceps Eckl. ex Klatt, endemic
- Aristea angolensis Baker, indigenous
- Aristea angolensis Baker subsp. acutivalvis Weim, indigenous
- Aristea angolensis Baker subsp. angolensis, indigenous
- Aristea angolensis Baker subsp. majubensis (Baker) Weim, accepted as Aristea angolensis Baker subsp. angolensis
- Aristea angolensis Baker subsp. pulchella Weim, endemic
- Aristea bakeri Klatt, endemic
- Aristea biflora Weim, endemic
- Aristea bracteata Pers, endemic
- Aristea cantharophila Goldblatt & J.C.Manning, endemic
- Aristea capitata (L.) Ker Gawl, endemic
- Aristea cistiflora J.C.Manning & Goldblatt, endemic
- Aristea cognata N.E.Br. ex Weim, accepted as Aristea abyssinica Pax
- Aristea compressa Buchinger, accepted as Aristea compressa Buchinger ex Baker
- Aristea compressa Buchinger ex Baker, indigenous
- Aristea confusa Goldblatt, accepted as Aristea bakeri Klatt
- Aristea cuspidata Schinz, endemic
- Aristea dichotoma (Thunb.) Ker Gawl, endemic
- Aristea ecklonii Baker, indigenous
- Aristea elliptica Goldblatt & A.P.Dold, endemic
- Aristea ensifolia John Muir, endemic
- Aristea fimbriata Goldblatt & J.C.Manning, endemic
- Aristea flexicaulis Baker, endemic
- Aristea galpinii N.E.Br. ex Weim, indigenous
- Aristea gerrardii Weim, accepted as Aristea compressa Buchinger ex Baker, indigenous
- Aristea glauca Klatt, endemic
- Aristea grandis Weim, endemic
- Aristea inaequalis Goldblatt & J.C.Manning, endemic
- Aristea juncifolia Baker, endemic
- Aristea latifolia G.J.Lewis, endemic
- Aristea lugens (L.f.) Steud, endemic
- Aristea macrocarpa G.J.Lewis, accepted as Aristea bakeri Klatt
- Aristea major Andrews, accepted as Aristea capitata (L.) Ker Gawl.
- Aristea montana Baker, indigenous
- Aristea monticola Goldblatt, accepted as Aristea bracteata Pers.
- Aristea nana Goldblatt & J.C.Manning, endemic
- Aristea nigrescens J.C.Manning & Goldblatt, endemic
- Aristea oligocephala Baker, endemic
- Aristea palustris Schltr, endemic
- Aristea parviflora Baker, indigenous
- Aristea pauciflora Wolley-Dod, endemic
- Aristea platycaulis Baker, endemic
- Aristea pusilla (Thunb.) Ker Gawl, endemic
- Aristea pusilla (Thunb.) Ker Gawl. subsp. robustior Weim, accepted as Aristea elliptica Goldblatt & A.P.Dold
- Aristea racemosa Baker, indigenous
- Aristea racemosa Baker var. inflata Weim, endemic
- Aristea racemosa Baker var. racemosa, endemic
- Aristea recisa Weim, endemic
- Aristea rigidifolia G.J.Lewis, endemic
- Aristea rufobracteata Goldblatt & J.C.Manning, endemic
- Aristea rupicola Goldblatt & J.C.Manning, endemic
- Aristea schizolaena Harv. ex Baker, endemic
- Aristea simplex Weim, endemic
- Aristea singularis Weim, endemic
- Aristea spiralis (L.f.) Ker Gawl, endemic
- Aristea teretifolia Goldblatt & J.C.Manning, endemic
- Aristea torulosa Klatt, indigenous
- Aristea woodii N.E.Br, accepted as Aristea torulosa Klatt
- Aristea zeyheri Baker, endemic

== Babiana ==
Genus Babiana:

- Babiana ambigua (Roem. & Schult.) G.J.Lewis, endemic
- Babiana angustifolia Sweet, endemic
- Babiana arenicola Goldblatt & J.C.Manning, indigenous
- Babiana attenuata G.J.Lewis, endemic
- Babiana auriculata G.J.Lewis, endemic
- Babiana avicularis Goldblatt & J.C.Manning, indigenous
- Babiana bainesii Baker, indigenous
- Babiana blanda (L.Bolus) G.J.Lewis, endemic
- Babiana brachystachys (Baker) G.J.Lewis, endemic
- Babiana carminea J.C.Manning & Goldblatt, indigenous
- Babiana cedarbergensis G.J.Lewis, endemic
- Babiana cinnamomea J.C.Manning & Goldblatt, indigenous
- Babiana confusa (G.J.Lewis) Goldblatt & J.C.Manning, endemic
- Babiana crispa G.J.Lewis, endemic
- Babiana cuneata J.C.Manning & Goldblatt, endemic
- Babiana curviscapa G.J.Lewis, endemic
- Babiana disticha Ker Gawl. accepted as Babiana fragrans (Jacq.) Steud.
- Babiana dregei Baker, endemic
- Babiana ecklonii Klatt, endemic
  - Babiana ecklonii Klatt var.ecklonii, accepted as Babiana ecklonii Klatt, endemic
  - Babiana ecklonii Klatt var. latifolia (L.Bolus) G.J.Lewis, accepted as Babiana latifolia L.Bolus, endemic
- Babiana engysiphon J.C.Manning & Goldblatt, indigenous
- Babiana falcata G.J.Lewis, accepted as Babiana hypogaea Burch.
- Babiana fimbriata (Klatt) Baker, endemic
- Babiana flabellifolia Harv. ex Klatt, endemic
- Babiana flavida G.J.Lewis, accepted as Babiana hypogaea Burch.
- Babiana foliosa G.J.Lewis, endemic
- Babiana fourcadei G.J.Lewis, endemic
- Babiana fragrans (Jacq.) Steud. endemic
- Babiana framesii L.Bolus, endemic
  - Babiana framesii L.Bolus var. kamiesbergensis G.J.Lewis, accepted as Babiana curviscapa G.J.Lewis, endemic
- Babiana gariepensis Goldblatt & J.C.Manning, indigenous
- Babiana geniculata G.J.Lewis, endemic
- Babiana grandiflora Goldblatt & J.C.Manning, indigenous
- Babiana hirsuta (Lam.) Goldblatt & J.C.Manning, endemic
- Babiana horizontalis G.J.Lewis, endemic
- Babiana hypogaea Burch. indigenous
- Babiana inclinata Goldblatt & J.C.Manning, indigenous
- Babiana karooica Goldblatt & J.C.Manning, indigenous
- Babiana klaverensis G.J.Lewis, accepted as Babiana mucronata (Jacq.) Ker Gawl. subsp. minor (G.J.Lewis) Goldblatt & J.C.Manning, endemic
- Babiana lanata Goldblatt & J.C.Manning, indigenous
- Babiana lapeirousioides Goldblatt & J.C.Manning, indigenous
- Babiana latifolia L.Bolus, endemic
- Babiana leipoldtii G.J.Lewis, endemic
- Babiana lewisiana B.Nord. endemic
- Babiana lineolata Klatt, endemic
- Babiana lobata G.J.Lewis, endemic
- Babiana longiflo (P.J.Bergius) Steud. accepted as Ixia paniculata D.Delaroche, indigenous
  - Babiana longiflora Goldblatt & J.C.Manning, accepted as Babiana tubaeformis Goldblatt & J.C.Manning, endemic
- Babiana melanops Goldblatt & J.C.Manning, indigenous
- Babiana minuta G.J.Lewis, endemic
- Babiana montana G.J.Lewis, endemic
- Babiana mucronata (Jacq.) Ker Gawl. endemic
  - Babiana mucronata (Jacq.) Ker Gawl. subsp. minor (G.J.Lewis) Goldblatt & J.C.Manning, endemic
  - Babiana mucronata (Jacq.) Ker Gawl. subsp. mucronata, endemic
  - Babiana mucronata (Jacq.) Ker Gawl. var. longituba G.J.Lewis, accepted as Babiana mucronata (Jacq.) Ker Gawl. subsp. mucronata, endemic
  - Babiana mucronata (Jacq.) Ker Gawl. var. minor G.J.Lewis, accepted as Babiana mucronata (Jacq.) Ker Gawl. subsp. minor (G.J.Lewis) Goldblatt & J.C.Manning
- Babiana namaquensis Baker, indigenous
- Babiana nana (Andrews) Spreng. indigenous
  - Babiana nana (Andrews) Spreng. subsp. maculata (Klatt) Goldblatt & J.C.Manning, endemic
  - Babiana nana (Andrews) Spreng. subsp. nana, endemic
  - Babiana nana (Andrews) Spreng. var. confusa G.J.Lewis, accepted as Babiana confusa (G.J.Lewis) Goldblatt & J.C.Manning, endemic
  - Babiana nana (Andrews) Spreng. var. maculata (Klatt) B.Nord. accepted as Babiana nana (Andrews) Spreng. subsp. maculata (Klatt) Goldblatt & J.C.Manning
- Babiana noctiflora J.C.Manning & Goldblatt, indigenous
- Babiana obliqua E.Phillips, accepted as Babiana ambigua (Roem. & Schult.) G.J.Lewis, endemic
- Babiana odorata L.Bolus, endemic
- Babiana papyracea Goldblatt & J.C.Manning, indigenous
- Babiana patersoniae L.Bolus, endemic
- Babiana patula N.E.Br. endemic
- Babiana pauciflora G.J.Lewis, endemic
- Babiana petiolata Goldblatt & J.C.Manning, indigenous
- Babiana pilosa G.J.Lewis, endemic
- Babiana planifolia (G.J.Lewis) Goldblatt & J.C.Manning, endemic
- Babiana praemorsa Goldblatt & J.C.Manning, endemic
- Babiana pubescens (Lam.) G.J.Lewis, endemic
- Babiana purpurea Ker Gawl. endemic
- Babiana pygmaea (Burm.f.) Baker, endemic
- Babiana radiata Goldblatt & J.C.Manning, indigenous
- Babiana regia (G.J.Lewis) Goldblatt & J.C.Manning, endemic
- Babiana rigidifolia Goldblatt & J.C.Manning, indigenous
- Babiana ringens (L.) Ker Gawl. indigenous
  - Babiana ringens (L.) Ker Gawl. subsp. australis Goldblatt & J.C.Manning, endemic
  - Babiana ringens (L.) Ker Gawl. subsp. ringens, endemic
- Babiana rivulicola Goldblatt & J.C.Manning, indigenous
- Babiana rubella Goldblatt & J.C.Manning, indigenous
- Babiana rubrocyanea (Jacq.) Ker Gawl. endemic
- Babiana salteri G.J.Lewis, endemic
- Babiana sambucina (Jacq.) Ker Gawl. indigenous
  - Babiana sambucina (Jacq.) Ker Gawl. subsp. longibracteata (G.J.Lewis) Goldblatt & J.C.Manning, endemic
  - Babiana sambucina (Jacq.) Ker Gawl. subsp. sambucina, endemic
  - Babiana sambucina (Jacq.) Ker Gawl. var. longibracteata G.J.Lewis, accepted as Babiana sambucina (Jacq.) Ker Gawl. subsp. longibracteata (G.J.Lewis) Goldblatt & J.C.Manning
  - Babiana sambucina (Jacq.) Ker Gawl. var. undulato-venosa (Klatt) G.J.Lewis, accepted as Babiana sambucina (Jacq.) Ker Gawl. subsp. sambucina, endemic
  - Babiana sambucina (Jacq.) Ker Gawl. var. unguiculata G.J.Lewis, accepted as Babiana rigidifolia Goldblatt & J.C.Manning, endemic
- Babiana scabrifolia Brehmer ex Klatt, endemic
  - Babiana scabrifolia Brehmer ex Klatt var. acuminata G.J.Lewis, accepted as Babiana scabrifolia Brehmer ex Klatt, endemic
  - Babiana scabrifolia Brehmer ex Klatt var. declinata G.J.Lewis, accepted as Babiana scabrifolia Brehmer ex Klatt, endemic
- Babiana scariosa G.J.Lewis, endemic
- Babiana secunda (Thunb.) Ker Gawl. endemic
- Babiana sinuata G.J.Lewis, endemic
- Babiana spathacea (L.f.) Ker Gawl. endemic
- Babiana spiralis Baker, endemic
- Babiana stenomera Schltr. endemic
- Babiana striata (Jacq.) G.J.Lewis, endemic
  - Babiana striata (Jacq.) G.J.Lewis var. planifolia G.J.Lewis, accepted as Babiana planifolia (G.J.Lewis) Goldblatt & J.C.Manning
- Babiana stricta (Aiton) Ker Gawl. endemic
  - Babiana stricta (Aiton) Ker Gawl. var. erectifolia G.J.Lewis, accepted as Babiana stricta (Aiton) Ker Gawl.
  - Babiana stricta (Aiton) Ker Gawl. var. grandiflora G.J.Lewis, accepted as Babiana tubaeformis Goldblatt & J.C.Manning
  - Babiana stricta (Aiton) Ker Gawl. var. regia G.J.Lewis, accepted as Babiana regia (G.J.Lewis) Goldblatt & J.C.Manning
  - Babiana stricta (Aiton) Ker Gawl. var. sulphurea (Jacq.) Baker, accepted as Babiana sulphurea (Jacq.) Ker Gawl.
- Babiana symmetrantha Goldblatt & J.C.Manning, indigenous
- Babiana tanquana J.C.Manning & Goldblatt, indigenous
- Babiana teretifolia Goldblatt & J.C.Manning, indigenous
- Babiana thunbergii Ker Gawl. accepted as Babiana hirsuta (Lam.) Goldblatt & J.C.Manning, endemic
- Babiana torta G.J.Lewis, endemic
- Babiana toximontana J.C.Manning & Goldblatt, indigenous
- Babiana tritonioides G.J.Lewis, endemic
- Babiana truncata G.J.Lewis, accepted as Babiana flabellifolia Harv. ex Klatt
- Babiana tubaeformis Goldblatt & J.C.Manning, endemic
- Babiana tubiflora (L.f.) Ker Gawl. endemic
- Babiana tubulosa (Burm.f.) Ker Gawl. endemic
  - Babiana tubulosa (Burm.f.) Ker Gawl. var. tubiflora (L.f.) G.J.Lewis, accepted as Babiana tubiflora (L.f.) Ker Gawl. endemic
- Babiana unguiculata G.J.Lewis, endemic
- Babiana vanzijliae L.Bolus, endemic
- Babiana villosa (Aiton) Ker Gawl. endemic
  - Babiana villosa (Aiton) Ker Gawl. var. grandis G.J.Lewis, accepted as Babiana villosa (Aiton) Ker Gawl. endemic
- Babiana villosula (J.F.Gmel.) Ker Gawl. ex Steud. endemic
- Babiana virescens Goldblatt & J.C.Manning, indigenous
- Babiana virginea Goldblatt, endemic

== Barnardiella ==
Genus Barnardiella:

- Barnardiella spiralis (N.E.Br.) Goldblatt, accepted as Moraea herrei (L.Bolus) Goldblatt

== Belamcanda ==
Genus Belamcanda:

- Belamcanda bulbifera (L.) Moench, accepted as Sparaxis bulbifera (L.) Ker Gawl.

== Bobartia ==
Genus Bobartia:

- Bobartia aphylla (L.f.) Ker Gawl. endemic
- Bobartia fasciculata J.B.Gillett ex Strid, endemic
- Bobartia filiformis (L.f.) Ker Gawl. endemic
- Bobartia gladiata (L.f.) Ker Gawl. indigenous
  - Bobartia gladiata (L.f.) Ker Gawl. subsp. gladiata, endemic
  - Bobartia gladiata (L.f.) Ker Gawl. subsp. major (G.J.Lewis) Strid, endemic
  - Bobartia gladiata (L.f.) Ker Gawl. subsp. teres Strid, endemic
- Bobartia gracilis Baker, endemic
- Bobartia indica L. endemic
- Bobartia lilacina G.J.Lewis, endemic
- Bobartia longicyma J.B.Gillett, indigenous
  - Bobartia longicyma J.B.Gillett subsp. longicyma, endemic
  - Bobartia longicyma J.B.Gillett subsp. magna J.B.Gillett ex Strid, endemic
  - Bobartia longicyma J.B.Gillett subsp. microflora Strid, endemic
- Bobartia macrocarpa Strid, endemic
- Bobartia macrospatha Baker, indigenous
  - Bobartia macrospatha Baker subsp. anceps (Baker) Strid, endemic
  - Bobartia macrospatha Baker subsp. macrospatha, endemic
- Bobartia orientalis J.B.Gillett, indigenous
  - Bobartia orientalis J.B.Gillett subsp. occidentalis Strid, endemic
  - Bobartia orientalis J.B.Gillett subsp. orientalis, endemic
- Bobartia paniculata G.J.Lewis, endemic
- Bobartia parva J.B.Gillett, endemic
- Bobartia robusta Baker, endemic
- Bobartia rufa Strid, endemic

== Chasmanthe ==
Genus Chasmanthe:

- Chasmanthe aethiopica (L.) N.E.Br. endemic
- Chasmanthe bicolor (Gasp.) N.E.Br. endemic
- Chasmanthe floribunda (Salisb.) N.E.Br. endemic
- Chasmanthe floribunda (Salisb.) N.E.Br. var. duckittii G.J.Lewis ex L.Bolus, accepted as Chasmanthe floribunda (Salisb.) N.E.Br.

== Codonorhiza ==
Genus Codonorhiza:

- Codonorhiza azurea (Eckl. ex Baker) Goldblatt & J.C.Manning, indigenous
- Codonorhiza corymbosa (L.) Goldblatt & J.C.Manning, indigenous
- Codonorhiza elandsmontana Goldblatt & J.C.Manning, indigenous
- Codonorhiza falcata (L.f.) Goldblatt & J.C.Manning, indigenous
- Codonorhiza fastigiata (Lam.) Goldblatt & J.C.Manning, indigenous
- Codonorhiza micrantha (E.Mey. ex Klatt) Goldblatt & J.C.Manning, indigenous
- Codonorhiza pillansii Goldblatt & J.C.Manning, indigenous

== Crocosmia ==
Genus Crocosmia:

- Crocosmia aurea (Pappe ex Hook.) Planch. indigenous
  - Crocosmia aurea (Pappe ex Hook.) Planch. subsp. aurea, indigenous
  - Crocosmia aurea (Pappe ex Hook.) Planch. var. maculata Baker, accepted as Crocosmia aurea (Pappe ex Hook.) Planch. subsp. aurea
- Crocosmia fucata (Herb.) M.P.de Vos, endemic
- Crocosmia masoniorum (L.Bolus) N.E.Br. endemic
- Crocosmia mathewsiana (L.Bolus) Goldblatt, endemic
- Crocosmia paniculata (Klatt) Goldblatt, indigenous
- Crocosmia pearsei Oberm. indigenous
- Crocosmia pottsii (McNab ex Baker) N.E.Br. endemic
- Crocosmia rochensis (Ker Gawl.) Klatt, accepted as Ixia bellendenii R.C.Foster, indigenous
- Crocosmia tenuiflora (Vahl) Klatt, accepted as Ixia paniculata D.Delaroche, indigenous

== Devia ==
Genus Devia:

- Devia xeromorpha Goldblatt & J.C.Manning, endemic

== Dierama ==
Genus Dierama:

- Dierama adelphicum Hilliard, indigenous
- Dierama ambiguum Hilliard, endemic
- Dierama argyreum L.Bolus, endemic
- Dierama atrum N.E.Br. endemic
- Dierama cooperi N.E.Br. endemic
- Dierama dissimile Hilliard, endemic
- Dierama dracomontanum Hilliard, indigenous
- Dierama dubium N.E.Br. endemic
- Dierama erectum Hilliard, endemic
- Dierama floriferum Hilliard, endemic
- Dierama formosum Hilliard, indigenous
- Dierama galpinii N.E.Br. indigenous
- Dierama gracile N.E.Br. endemic
- Dierama grandiflorum G.J.Lewis, endemic
- Dierama igneum Klatt, endemic
- Dierama insigne N.E.Br. indigenous
- Dierama jucundum Hilliard, indigenous
- Dierama latifolium N.E.Br. endemic
- Dierama luteoalbidum I.Verd. endemic
- Dierama medium N.E.Br. indigenous
- Dierama mobile Hilliard, indigenous
- Dierama mossii (N.E.Br.) Hilliard, indigenous
- Dierama nebrownii Hilliard, endemic
- Dierama nixonianum Hilliard, endemic
- Dierama pallidum Hilliard, endemic
- Dierama palustre N.E.Br. accepted as Dierama latifolium N.E.Br.
- Dierama pauciflorum N.E.Br. indigenous
- Dierama pendulum (L.f.) Baker, endemic
- Dierama pictum N.E.Br. indigenous
- Dierama pulcherrimum (Hook.f.) Baker, endemic
- Dierama pumilum N.E.Br. endemic
- Dierama reynoldsii I.Verd. endemic
- Dierama robustum N.E.Br. indigenous
- Dierama sertum Hilliard, endemic
- Dierama trichorhizum (Baker) N.E.Br. indigenous
- Dierama tyrium Hilliard, endemic
- Dierama tysonii N.E.Br. endemic

== Dietes ==
Genus Dietes:

- Dietes bicolor (Steud.) Sweet ex Klatt, endemic
  - Dietes bicolor (Steud.) Sweet ex Klatt subsp. armeniaca Goldblatt & J.C.Manning, endemic
  - Dietes bicolor (Steud.) Sweet ex Klatt subsp. bicolor, endemic
- Dietes butcheriana Gerstner, endemic
- Dietes flavida Oberm. indigenous
- Dietes grandiflora N.E.Br. indigenous
- Dietes iridioides (L.) Sweet ex Klatt, indigenous
  - Dietes iridioides (L.) Sweet ex Klatt subsp. iridioides, indigenous

== Duthiastrum ==
Genus Duthiastrum:

- Duthiastrum linifolium (E.Phillips) M.P.de Vos, endemic

== Ferraria ==
Genus Ferraria:

- Ferraria antherosa Ker Gawl. accepted as Ferraria variabilis Goldblatt & J.C.Manning, indigenous
- Ferraria brevifolia G.J.Lewis, endemic
- Ferraria crispa Burm. subsp. crispa, accepted as Ferraria crispa Burm. endemic
- Ferraria crispa Burm. subsp. nortieri M.P.de Vos, accepted as Ferraria crispa Burm. endemic
- Ferraria densepunctulata M.P.de Vos, endemic
- Ferraria divaricata Sweet, endemic
- Ferraria ferrariola (Jacq.) Willd. endemic
- Ferraria foliosa G.J.Lewis, endemic
- Ferraria glutinosa (Baker) Rendle, indigenous
- Ferraria kamiesbergensis M.P.de Vos, accepted as Ferraria macrochlamys (Baker) Goldblatt & J.C.Manning subsp. kamiesbergensis (M.P.de Vos) Goldblatt, endemic
- Ferraria macrochlamys (Baker) Goldblatt & J.C.Manning, endemic
  - Ferraria macrochlamy (Baker) Goldblatt & J.C.Manning subsp. kamiesbergensis (M.P.de Vos) Goldblatt, endemic
  - Ferraria macrochlamys (Baker) Goldblatt & J.C.Manning subsp. macrochlamys, endemic
  - Ferraria macrochlamys (Baker) Goldblatt & J.C.Manning subsp. serpentina Goldblatt & J.C.Manning, indigenous
- Ferraria ornata Goldblatt & J.C.Manning, indigenous
- Ferraria ovata (Thunb.) Goldblatt & J.C.Manning, endemic
- Ferraria parva Goldblatt & J.C.Manning, indigenous
- Ferraria schaeferi Dinter, indigenous
- Ferraria uncinata Sweet, endemic
  - Ferraria uncinat] Sweet subsp. macrochlamys (Baker) M.P.de Vos, accepted as Ferraria macrochlamys (Baker) Goldblatt & J.C.Manning subsp. macrochlamys
- Ferraria variabilis Goldblatt & J.C.Manning, endemic

== Freesia ==
Genus Freesia:

- Freesea mineatolateritia Eckl. accepted as Ixia tenuifolia Vahl, indigenous
- Freesia alba (G.L.Mey.) Gumbl. accepted as Freesia leichtlinii Klatt subsp. alba (G.L.Mey.) J.C.Manning & Goldblatt, endemic
- Freesia andersoniae L.Bolus, endemic
- Freesia armstrongii W.Watson, accepted as Freesia corymbosa (Burm.f.) N.E.Br.
- Freesia aurea E.G.Hend. ex Gumbl. accepted as Freesia corymbosa (Burm.f.) N.E.Br.
- Freesia brevis N.E.Br. accepted as Freesia corymbosa (Burm.f.) N.E.Br.
- Freesia caryophyllacea (Burm.f.) N.E.Br. endemic
- Freesia corymbosa (Burm.f.) N.E.Br. endemic
  - Freesia corymbosa (Burm.f.) N.E.Br. var. aurea (E.G.Hend. ex Gumbl.) N.E.Br. accepted as Freesia corymbosa (Burm.f.) N.E.Br.
- Freesia elimensis L.Bolus, accepted as Freesia caryophyllacea (Burm.f.) N.E.Br.
- Freesia fergusoniae L.Bolus, endemic
- Freesia flava (N.E.Br.) N.E.Br. accepted as Freesia speciosa L.Bolus
- Freesia framesii L.Bolus, accepted as Freesia occidentalis L.Bolus
- Freesia fucata J.C.Manning & Goldblatt, endemic
- Freesia grandiflora (Baker) Klatt, indigenous
  - Freesia grandiflor] (Baker) Klatt subsp. grandiflora, indigenous
- Freesia herbertii Klatt ex N.E.Br. accepted as Freesia caryophyllacea (Burm.f.) N.E.Br.
- Freesia hurlingii L.Bolus, accepted as Freesia refracta (Jacq.) Klatt
- Freesia juncea (Ker Gawl.) Klatt, accepted as Freesia verrucosa (B.Vogel) Goldblatt & J.C.Manning
- Freesia lactea Fenzl ex N.E.Br. accepted as Freesia leichtlinii Klatt subsp. alba (G.L.Mey.) J.C.Manning & Goldblatt
- Freesia laxa (Thunb.) Goldblatt & J.C.Manning, indigenous
  - Freesia laxa (Thunb.) Goldblatt & J.C.Manning subsp. azurea (Goldblatt & Hutchings) Goldblatt & J.C. indigenous
  - Freesia laxa (Thunb.) Goldblatt & J.C.Manning subsp. laxa, indigenous
- Freesia leichtlinii Klatt, accepted as Freesia leichtlinii Klatt subsp. leichtlinii, endemic
- Freesia marginata J.C.Manning & Goldblatt, endemic
- Freesia metelerkampiae L.Bolus, accepted as Freesia corymbosa (Burm.f.) N.E.Br.
- Freesia middlemostii W.F.Barker, accepted as Freesia leichtlinii Klatt subsp. leichtlinii
- Freesia muirii N.E.Br. accepted as Freesia leichtlinii Klatt subsp. leichtlinii
- Freesia occidentalis L.Bolus, endemic
- Freesia odorota Eckl. ex Klatt, accepted as Freesia corymbosa (Burm.f.) N.E.Br.
- Freesia parva N.E.Br. accepted as Freesia caryophyllacea (Burm.f.) N.E.Br.
- Freesia picta N.E.Br. accepted as Freesia leichtlinii Klatt subsp. alba (G.L.Mey.) J.C.Manning & Goldblatt
- Freesia praecox J.C.Manning & Goldblatt, indigenous
- Freesia refracta (Jacq.) Klatt, endemic
  - Freesia refracta (Jacq.) Klatt var. alba G.L.Mey. accepted as Freesia leichtlinii Klatt subsp. alba (G.L.Mey.) J.C.Manning & Goldblatt
  - Freesia refracta (Jacq.) Klatt var. odorata (Eckl. ex Klatt) Baker, accepted as Freesia corymbosa (Burm.f.) N.E.Br.
- Freesia sparrmanii (Thunb.) N.E.Br. endemic
  - Freesia sparrmanii (Thunb.) N.E.Br. var. alba (G.L.Mey.) N.E.Br. accepted as Freesia leichtlinii Klatt subsp. alba (G.L.Mey.) J.C.Manning & Goldblatt
- Freesia sparrmannii (Thunb.) N.E.Br. var. flava N.E.Br. accepted as Freesia speciosa L.Bolus
- Freesia speciosa L.Bolus, endemic
- Freesia verrucosa (B.Vogel) Goldblatt & J.C.Manning, endemic
- Freesia viridis (Aiton) Goldblatt & J.C.Manning, indigenous
  - Freesia viridis (Aiton) Goldblatt & J.C.Manning subsp. viridis, endemic
- Freesia xanthospila (DC.) Klatt, accepted as Freesia caryophyllacea (Burm.f.) N.E.Br.

== Galaxia ==
Genus Galaxia:

- Galaxia alata Goldblatt. accepted as Moraea angulata Goldblatt
- Galaxia albiflora G.J.Lewis. accepted as Moraea albiflora (G.J.Lewis) Goldblatt
- Galaxia barnardii Goldblatt. accepted as Moraea barnardiella Goldblatt
- Galaxia ciliata Pers. accepted as Moraea pilifolia Goldblatt
- Galaxia citrina G.J.Lewis. accepted as Moraea citrina (G.J.Lewis) Goldblatt
- Galaxia fenestralis Goldblatt & E.G.H.Oliv. accepted as Moraea fenestralis (Goldblatt & E.G.H.Oliv.) Goldblatt
- Galaxia fugacissima (L.f.) Druce. accepted as Moraea fugacissima (L.f.) Goldblatt
- Galaxia grandiflora Andrews. accepted as Moraea kamiesensis Goldblatt
- Galaxia ixiiflora DC. accepted as Ixia monadelpha D.Delaroche.indigenous
- Galaxia kamiesmontana Goldblatt. accepted as Moraea kamiesmontana (Goldblatt) Goldblatt
- Galaxia luteoalba Goldblatt. accepted as Moraea luteoalba (Goldblatt) Goldblatt
- Galaxia ovata Thunb. accepted as Moraea galaxia (L.f.) Goldblatt & J.C.Manning
- Galaxia parva Goldblatt. accepted as Moraea minima Goldblatt
- Galaxia plicata Jacq. accepted as Lapeirousia plicata (Jacq.) Diels subsp. plicata
- Galaxia ramosa DC. accepted as Ixia monadelpha D.Delaroche. indigenous
- Galaxia stagnalis Goldblatt. accepted as Moraea stagnalis (Goldblatt) Goldblatt
- Galaxia variabilis G.J.Lewis. accepted as Moraea variabilis (G.J.Lewis) Goldblatt
- Galaxia versicolor Salisb. ex Klatt. accepted as Moraea versicolor (Salisb. ex Klatt) Goldblatt

== Geissorhiza ==
Genus Geissorhiza:

- Geissorhiza alticola Goldblatt. endemic
- Geissorhiza altimontana Goldblatt & J.C.Manning. endemic
- Geissorhiza arenicola Goldblatt. endemic
- Geissorhiza aspera Goldblatt. endemic
- Geissorhiza barkerae Goldblatt. endemic
- Geissorhiza bolusii Baker. endemic
- Geissorhiza bonaspei Goldblatt. endemic
- Geissorhiza bracteata Klatt. endemic
- Geissorhiza brehmii Eckl. ex Klatt. endemic
- Geissorhiza brevituba (G.J.Lewis) Goldblatt. endemic
- Geissorhiza bryicola Goldblatt. endemic
- Geissorhiza burchellii R.C.Foster. endemic
- Geissorhiza callista Goldblatt. endemic
- Geissorhiza cantharophila Goldblatt & J.C.Manning. endemic
- Geissorhiza cataractarum Goldblatt. endemic
- Geissorhiza cedarmontana Goldblatt. endemic
- Geissorhiza ciliatula Goldblatt. endemic
- Geissorhiza confusa Goldblatt. endemic
- Geissorhiza corrugata Klatt. endemic
- Geissorhiza darlingensis Goldblatt. endemic
- Geissorhiza delicatula Goldblatt. endemic
- Geissorhiza demissa Goldblatt & J.C.Manning. endemic
- Geissorhiza divaricata Goldblatt. endemic
- Geissorhiza elsiae Goldblatt. endemic
- Geissorhiza erosa (Salisb.) R.C.Foster. endemic
- Geissorhiza erubescens Goldblatt. endemic
- Geissorhiza esterhuyseniae Goldblatt. endemic
- Geissorhiza eurystigma L.Bolus. endemic
- Geissorhiza exilis Goldblatt & J.C.Manning. endemic
- Geissorhiza exscapa (Thunb.) Goldblatt. endemic
- Geissorhiza foliosa Klatt. endemic
- Geissorhiza fourcadei (L.Bolus) G.J.Lewis. endemic
- Geissorhiza furva Ker Gawl. ex Baker. endemic
- Geissorhiza geminata E.Mey. ex Baker. endemic
- Geissorhiza grandiflora Goldblatt. endemic
- Geissorhiza helmei Goldblatt & J.C.Manning. endemic
- Geissorhiza hesperanthoides Schltr. endemic
- Geissorhiza heterostyla L.Bolus. endemic
  - Geissorhiza heterostyla L.Bolus subsp. heterostyla. endemic
  - Geissorhiza heterostyla L.Bolus subsp. rosea (Klatt) Goldblatt & J.C.Manning. endemic
- Geissorhiza hispidula (R.C.Foster) Goldblatt. endemic
- Geissorhiza humilis (Thunb.) Ker Gawl. endemic
- Geissorhiza imbricata (D.Delaroche) Ker Gawl. indigenous
  - Geissorhiza imbricata (D.Delaroche) Ker Gawl. subsp. bicolor (Thunb.) Goldblatt. endemic
  - Geissorhiza imbricata (D.Delaroche) Ker Gawl. subsp. imbricata. endemic
- Geissorhiza inaequalis L.Bolus. endemic
- Geissorhiza inconspicua Baker. endemic
- Geissorhiza inflexa (D.Delaroche) Ker Gawl. endemic
- Geissorhiza intermedia Goldblatt. endemic
- Geissorhiza ixioides Schltr. endemic
- Geissorhiza juncea (Link) A.Dietr. endemic
- Geissorhiza kamiesmontana Goldblatt. endemic
- Geissorhiza karooica Goldblatt. endemic
- Geissorhiza lapidosa Goldblatt & J.C.Manning. endemic
- Geissorhiza latifolia (D.Delaroche) Baker. accepted as Ixia latifolia D.Delaroche.indigenous
- Geissorhiza leipoldtii R.C.Foster. endemic
- Geissorhiza lewisiae R.C.Foster. endemic
- Geissorhiza lithicola Goldblatt. endemic
- Geissorhiza longifolia (G.J.Lewis) Goldblatt. endemic
- Geissorhiza louisabolusiae R.C.Foster. endemic
- Geissorhiza lutea Eckl. accepted as Hesperantha falcata (L.f.) Ker Gawl. subsp. lutea (Benth. ex Baker) Goldblatt & J.C.Manning.
- Geissorhiza malmesburiensis R.C.Foster. endemic
- Geissorhiza mathewsii L.Bolus. endemic
- Geissorhiza melanthera Goldblatt & J.C.Manning.indigenous
- Geissorhiza minuta Goldblatt. endemic
- Geissorhiza monanthos Eckl. endemic
- Geissorhiza monticola Goldblatt & J.C.Manning. endemic
- Geissorhiza namaquamontana Goldblatt & J.C.Manning. endemic
- Geissorhiza namaquensis W.F.Barker. endemic
- Geissorhiza nana Klatt. endemic
- Geissorhiza nigromontana Goldblatt. endemic
- Geissorhiza nubigena Goldblatt. endemic
- Geissorhiza nutans Goldblatt & J.C.Manning. endemic
- Geissorhiza ornithogaloides Klatt.indigenous
  - Geissorhiza ornithogaloides Klatt subsp. marlothii (R.C.Foster) Goldblatt. endemic
  - Geissorhiza ornithogaloides Klatt subsp. ornithogaloides, endemic
- Geissorhiza outeniquensis Goldblatt. endemic
- Geissorhiza ovalifolia R.C.Foster. endemic
- Geissorhiza ovata (Burm.f.) Asch. & Graebn. endemic
- Geissorhiza pappei Baker. endemic
- Geissorhiza parva Baker. endemic
- Geissorhiza platystigma Goldblatt & J.C.Manning. endemic
- Geissorhiza pseudinaequalis Goldblatt. endemic
- Geissorhiza purpurascens Goldblatt. endemic
- Geissorhiza purpureolutea Baker. endemic
- Geissorhiza pusilla (Andrews) Klatt. endemic
- Geissorhiza radians (Thunb.) Goldblatt. endemic
- Geissorhiza ramosa Ker Gawl. ex Klatt. endemic
- Geissorhiza reclinata Goldblatt & J.C.Manning. endemic
- Geissorhiza roseoalba (G.J.Lewis) Goldblatt. endemic
- Geissorhiza rupicola Goldblatt & J.C.Manning. endemic
- Geissorhiza saxicola Goldblatt & J.C.Manning. endemic
- Geissorhiza schinzii (Baker) Goldblatt. endemic
- Geissorhiza scillaris A.Dietr. endemic
- Geissorhiza scopulosa Goldblatt. endemic
- Geissorhiza setacea (Thunb.) Ker Gawl. endemic
- Geissorhiza silenoides Goldblatt & J.C.Manning. endemic
- Geissorhiza similis Goldblatt. endemic
- Geissorhiza spiralis (Burch.) M.P.de Vos ex Goldblatt. endemic
- Geissorhiza splendidissima Diels. endemic
- Geissorhiza stenosiphon Goldblatt. endemic
- Geissorhiza subrigida L.Bolus. endemic
- Geissorhiza sufflava Goldblatt & J.C.Manning. endemic
- Geissorhiza sulphurascens Schltr. ex R.C.Foster. endemic
- Geissorhiza tabularis Goldblatt. endemic
- Geissorhiza tenella Goldblatt. endemic
- Geissorhiza tricolor Goldblatt & J.C.Manning. endemic
- Geissorhiza tulbaghensis F.Bolus. endemic
- Geissorhiza uliginosa Goldblatt & J.C.Manning. endemic
- Geissorhiza umbrosa G.J.Lewis. endemic
- Geissorhiza unifolia Goldblatt. endemic

== Gladiolus ==
Genus Gladiolus:

- Gladiolus abbreviatus Andrews. endemic
- Gladiolus acuminatus F.Bolus. endemic
- Gladiolus alatus L. endemic
  - Gladiolus alatus L. var. algoensis Herb. accepted as Gladiolus alatus L.
  - Gladiolus alatus L. var. meliusculus G.J.Lewis. accepted as Gladiolus meliusculus (G.J.Lewis) Goldblatt & J.C.Manning
  - Gladiolus alatus L. var. pulcherrimus G.J.Lewis. accepted as Gladiolus pulcherrimus (G.J.Lewis) Goldblatt & J.C.Manning
  - Gladiolus alatus L. var. speciosus (Thunb.) G.J.Lewis. accepted as Gladiolus speciosus Thunb.
- Gladiolus albens Goldblatt & J.C.Manning. endemic
- Gladiolus amabilis Salisb. accepted as Freesia verrucosa (B.Vogel) Goldblatt & J.C.Manning
- Gladiolus anceps L.f. accepted as Lapeirousia anceps (L.f.) Ker Gawl
- Gladiolus angustus L. endemic
- Gladiolus antholyzoides Baker. endemic
- Gladiolus appendiculatus G.J.Lewis. indigenous
  - Gladiolus appendiculatus G.J.Lewis var. longifolius G.J.Lewis. accepted as Gladiolus appendiculatus G.J.Lewis
- Gladiolus aquamontanus Goldblatt. endemic
- Gladiolus arcuatus Klatt. endemic
- Gladiolus atropictus Goldblatt & J.C.Manning. endemic
- Gladiolus aurantiacus Klatt. indigenous
- Gladiolus aureus Baker. endemic
- Gladiolus bilineatus G.J.Lewis. endemic
- Gladiolus blommesteinii L.Bolus. endemic
- Gladiolus bonaspei Goldblatt & M.P.de Vos. accepted as Gladiolus merianellus (L.) Thunb. endemic
- Gladiolus brachyphyllus F.Bolus.indigenous
- Gladiolus bracteatus Thunb. accepted as Lapeirousia pyramidalis (Lam.) Goldblatt subsp. pyramidalis
- Gladiolus brevifolius Jacq. endemic
  - Gladiolus brevifolius Jacq. var. minor G.J.Lewis. accepted as Gladiolus brevifolius Jacq.
  - Gladiolus brevifolius Jacq. var. obscurus G.J.Lewis. accepted as Gladiolus brevifolius Jacq.
  - Gladiolus brevifolius Jacq. var. robustus G.J.Lewis. accepted as Gladiolus brevifolius Jacq.
- Gladiolus brevitubus G.J.Lewis. endemic
- Gladiolus buckerveldii (L.Bolus) Goldblatt. endemic
- Gladiolus bullatus Thunb. ex G.J.Lewis. endemic
- Gladiolus caeruleus Goldblatt & J.C.Manning. endemic
- Gladiolus calcaratus G.J.Lewis. endemic
- Gladiolus cardinalis Curtis. endemic
- Gladiolus carinatus Aiton. endemic
- Gladiolus carinatus Aiton subsp. parviflorus G.J.Lewis. accepted as Gladiolus griseus Goldblatt & J.C.Manning
- Gladiolus carmineus C.H.Wright. endemic
- Gladiolus carneus D.Delaroche. endemic
- Gladiolus caryophyllaceus (Burm.f.) Poir. endemic
- Gladiolus cataractarum Oberm. endemic
- Gladiolus ceresianus L.Bolus. endemic
- Gladiolus citrinus Klatt. accepted as Gladiolus trichonemifolius Ker Gawl.
- Gladiolus coccineus (Thunb.) Schrank. accepted as Ixia campanulata Houtt. indigenous
- Gladiolus comptonii G.J.Lewis. endemic
- Gladiolus corymbosa Burm.f. accepted as Freesia corymbosa (Burm.f.) N. e.Br.
- Gladiolus crassifolius Baker. indigenous
- Gladiolus crispulatus L.Bolus. endemic
- Gladiolus cruentus T.Moore. endemic
- Gladiolus cunonius (L.) Gaertn. endemic
- Gladiolus cylindraceus G.J.Lewis. endemic
- Gladiolus dalenii Van Geel.indigenous
  - Gladiolus dalenii Van Geel subsp. dalenii, indigenous
- Gladiolus debilis Sims. endemic
  - Gladiolus debilis Sims var. cochleatus (Sweet) G.J.Lewis. accepted as Gladiolus debilis Sims
  - Gladiolus debilis Sims var. variegatus G.J.Lewis. accepted as Gladiolus variegatus (G.J.Lewis) Goldblatt & J.C.Manning
- Gladiolus delpierrei Goldblatt. endemic
- Gladiolus densiflorus Baker, indigenous
- Gladiolus deserticola Goldblatt. endemic
- Gladiolus dolichosiphon Goldblatt & J.C.Manning. endemic
- Gladiolus dolomiticus Oberm. endemic
- Gladiolus ecklonii Lehm. indigenous
  - Gladiolus ecklonii Lehm. subsp. rehmannii (Baker) Oberm. accepted as Gladiolus rehmannii Baker
  - Gladiolus ecklonii Lehm. subsp. vinosomaculatus (Kies) Oberm. accepted as Gladiolus vinosomaculatus Kies
- Gladiolus elliotii Baker, indigenous
- Gladiolus emiliae L.Bolus. endemic
- Gladiolus engysiphon G.J.Lewis. endemic
- Gladiolus equitans Thunb. endemic
- Gladiolus excisus Jacq. accepted as Freesia verrucosa (B.Vogel) Goldblatt & J.C.Manning
- Gladiolus exiguus G.J.Lewis. endemic
- Gladiolus exilis G.J.Lewis. endemic
- Gladiolus falcatus L.f. accepted as Codonorhiza falcata (L.f.) Goldblatt & J.C.Manning
- Gladiolus ferrugineus Goldblatt & J.C.Manning. indigenous
- Gladiolus filiformis Goldblatt & J.C.Manning. endemic
- Gladiolus fissifolius Jacq. accepted as Lapeirousia pyramidalis (Lam.) Goldblatt subsp. pyramidalis
- Gladiolus flanaganii Baker. indigenous
- Gladiolus floribundus Jacq. endemic
  - Gladiolus floribundus Jacq. subsp. fasciatus (Roem. & Schult.) Oberm. accepted as Gladiolus grandiflorus Andrews
  - Gladiolus floribundus Jacq. subsp. milleri (Ker Gawl.) Oberm. accepted as Gladiolus grandiflorus Andrews
  - Gladiolus floribundus Jacq. subsp. miniatus (Eckl.) Oberm. accepted as Gladiolus miniatus Eckl.
  - Gladiolus floribundus Jacq. subsp. rudis (Licht. ex Roem. & Schult.) Oberm. accepted as Gladiolus rudis Licht. ex Roem. & Schult.
- Gladiolus fourcadei (L.Bolus) Goldblatt & M.P.de Vos. endemic
- Gladiolus geardii L.Bolus. endemic
- Gladiolus gracilis Jacq. endemic
  - Gladiolus gracilis Jacq. var. latifolius G.J.Lewis. accepted as Gladiolus caeruleus Goldblatt & J.C.Manning
- Gladiolus grandiflorus Andrews. endemic
- Gladiolus griseus Goldblatt & J.C.Manning. endemic
- Gladiolus gueinzii Kunze. endemic
- Gladiolus guthriei F.Bolus. endemic
- Gladiolus halophila Goldblatt & J.C.Manning. accepted as Gladiolus diluvialis Goldblatt & J.C.Manning
- Gladiolus hirsutus Jacq. endemic
- Gladiolus hollandii L.Bolus.indigenous
- Gladiolus huttonii (N. e.Br.) Goldblatt & M.P.de Vos. endemic
- Gladiolus hyalinus Jacq. endemic
- Gladiolus inandensis Baker. endemic
- Gladiolus inflatus Thunb. endemic
  - Gladiolus inflatus Thunb. subsp. intermedius G.J.Lewis. accepted as Gladiolus patersoniae F.Bolus
  - Gladiolus inflatus Thunb. var. louiseae (L.Bolus) Oberm. accepted as Gladiolus inflatus Thunb.
- Gladiolus inflexus Goldblatt & J.C.Manning. endemic
- Gladiolus insolens Goldblatt & J.C.Manning. endemic
- Gladiolus invenustus G.J.Lewis. accepted as Gladiolus densiflorus Baker
- Gladiolus involutus D.Delaroche. endemic
- Gladiolus ixioides Thunb. accepted as Ixia paniculata D.Delaroche.indigenous
- Gladiolus jonquilliodorus Eckl. ex G.J.Lewis. endemic
- Gladiolus junceus L.f. accepted as Freesia verrucosa (B.Vogel) Goldblatt & J.C.Manning
- Gladiolus kamiesbergensis G.J.Lewis. endemic
- Gladiolus karooicus Goldblatt & J.C.Manning. endemic
- Gladiolus lapeirousioides Goldblatt. endemic
- Gladiolus laxus Thunb. accepted as Freesia laxa (Thunb.) Goldblatt & J.C.Manning subsp. laxa
- Gladiolus leptosiphon F.Bolus. endemic
- Gladiolus lewisiae Oberm. endemic
- Gladiolus liliaceus Houtt. endemic
- Gladiolus lineatus Salisb. accepted as Tritonia gladiolaris (Lam.) Goldblatt & J.C.Manning, indigenous
- Gladiolus longicollis Baker, indigenous
  - Gladiolus longicollis Baker subsp. longicollis, indigenous
  - Gladiolus longicollis Baker subsp. platypetalus (Baker) Goldblatt & J.C.Manning. indigenous
  - Gladiolus longicollis Baker var. platypetalus (Baker) Oberm. accepted as Gladiolus longicollis Baker subsp. platypetalus (Baker) Goldblatt & J.C.Manning
- Gladiolus longiflorus (P.J.Bergius) Jacq. accepted as Ixia paniculata D.Delaroche, indigenous
- Gladiolus loteniensis Hilliard & B.L.Burtt. endemic
- Gladiolus macneilii Oberm. endemic
- Gladiolus maculatus Sweet. endemic
  - Gladiolus maculatus Sweet subsp. eburneus Oberm. accepted as Gladiolus albens Goldblatt & J.C.Manning
  - Gladiolus maculatus Sweet subsp. hibernus (Ingram) Oberm. accepted as Gladiolus maculatus Sweet
  - Gladiolus maculatus Sweet subsp. meridionalis (G.J.Lewis) Oberm. accepted as Gladiolus meridionalis G.J.Lewis
- Gladiolus malvinus Goldblatt & J.C.Manning. endemic
- Gladiolus marlothii G.J.Lewis. endemic
- Gladiolus martleyi L.Bolus. endemic
- Gladiolus meliusculus (G.J.Lewis) Goldblatt & J.C.Manning. endemic
- Gladiolus merianellus (L.) Thunb. endemic
- Gladiolus meridionalis G.J.Lewis. endemic
- Gladiolus microcarpus G.J.Lewis. endemic
  - Gladiolus microcarpus G.J.Lewis subsp. italaensis Oberm. accepted as Gladiolus scabridus Goldblatt & J.C.Manning
- Gladiolus miniatus Eckl. endemic
- Gladiolus monticola G.J.Lewis ex Goldblatt & J.C.Manning. endemic
- Gladiolus mortonius Herb. endemic
- Gladiolus mostertiae L.Bolus. endemic
- Gladiolus mutabilis G.J.Lewis. endemic
- Gladiolus nerineoides G.J.Lewis. endemic
- Gladiolus nigromontanus Goldblatt. endemic
- Gladiolus oatesii Rolfe, indigenous
- Gladiolus ochroleucus Baker, indigenous
- Gladiolus ochroleucus Baker var. macowanii (Baker) Oberm. accepted as Gladiolus mortonius Herb.
- Gladiolus odoratus L.Bolus. accepted as Gladiolus guthriei F.Bolus
- Gladiolus oppositiflorus Herb. endemic
  - Gladiolus oppositiflorus Herb. subsp. salmoneus (Baker) Oberm. accepted as Gladiolus oppositiflorus Herb.
- Gladiolus orchidiflorus Andrews, indigenous
- Gladiolus oreocharis Schltr. endemic
- Gladiolus ornatus Klatt. endemic
- Gladiolus overbergensis Goldblatt & M.P.de Vos. endemic
- Gladiolus paludosus Baker, indigenous
- Gladiolus paniculatus Pers. accepted as Freesia verrucosa (B.Vogel) Goldblatt & J.C.Manning
- Gladiolus papilio Hook.f. indigenous
- Gladiolus pappei Baker, endemic
- Gladiolus pardalinus Goldblatt & J.C.Manning, endemic
- Gladiolus parvulus Schltr, indigenous
- Gladiolus patersoniae F.Bolus. endemic
- Gladiolus pavonia Goldblatt & J.C.Manning. endemic
- Gladiolus permeabilis D.Delaroche, indigenous
  - Gladiolus permeabilis D.Delaroche subsp. edulis (Burch. ex Ker Gawl.) Oberm, indigenous
  - Gladiolus permeabilis D.Delaroche subsp. permeabilis, endemic
  - Gladiolus permeabilis D.Delaroche subsp. wilsonii (Baker) G.J.Lewis. accepted as Gladiolus wilsonii (Baker) Goldblatt & J.C.Manning
- Gladiolus phoenix Goldblatt & J.C.Manning. endemic
- Gladiolus pillansii G.J.Lewis var. pillansii, accepted as Gladiolus martleyi L.Bolus
  - Gladiolus pillansii G.J.Lewis var. roseus G.J.Lewis. accepted as Gladiolus martleyi L.Bolus
- Gladiolus pole-evansii I.Verd. endemic
- Gladiolus polystachyus Andr. accepted as Freesia verrucosa (B.Vogel) Goldblatt & J.C.Manning
- Gladiolus pretoriensis Kuntze. endemic
- Gladiolus priorii (N. e.Br.) Goldblatt & M.P.de Vos. endemic
- Gladiolus pritzelii Diels. endemic
  - Gladiolus pritzelii Diels var. sufflavus G.J.Lewis. accepted as Gladiolus sufflavus (G.J.Lewis) Goldblatt & J.C.Manning
- Gladiolus psittacinus Hook.f. accepted as Gladiolus dalenii Van Geel subsp. dalenii
- Gladiolus pubigerus G.J.Lewis.indigenous
- Gladiolus pulchellus Salisb. accepted as Freesia verrucosa (B.Vogel) Goldblatt & J.C.Manning
- Gladiolus pulcherrimus (G.J.Lewis) Goldblatt & J.C.Manning. endemic
- Gladiolus punctulatus Schrank var. autumnalis G.J.Lewis. accepted as Gladiolus hirsutus Jacq.
  - Gladiolus punctulatus Schrank var. punctulatus, accepted as Gladiolus hirsutus Jacq.
- Gladiolus pyramidalis Burm.f. accepted as Ixia patens Aiton, indigenous
- Gladiolus quadrangularis (Burm.f.) Ker Gawl. endemic
- Gladiolus quadrangulus (D.Delaroche) Barnard. endemic
- Gladiolus ramosus L. accepted as Ixia scillaris L. subsp. scillaris, indigenous
- Gladiolus recurvus L. endemic
- Gladiolus refractus Jacq. accepted as Freesia refracta (Jacq.) Klatt
- Gladiolus reginae Goldblatt & J.C.Manning. endemic
- Gladiolus rehmannii Baker, indigenous
- Gladiolus resupinatus Pers. accepted as Freesia refracta (Jacq.) Klatt.
- Gladiolus rhodanthus J.C.Manning & Goldblatt. endemic
- Gladiolus robertsoniae F.Bolus. endemic
- Gladiolus robustus Goldblatt. accepted as Gladiolus geardii L.Bolus
- Gladiolus rogersii Baker. endemic
  - Gladiolus rogersii Baker var. graminifolius G.J.Lewis. accepted as Gladiolus rogersii Baker
  - Gladiolus rogersii Baker var. vlokii Goldblatt. accepted as Gladiolus rogersii Baker
- Gladiolus roseovenosus Goldblatt & J.C.Manning. endemic
- Gladiolus rudis Licht. ex Roem. & Schult. endemic
- Gladiolus rufomarginatus G.J.Lewis. endemic
- Gladiolus saccatus (Klatt) Goldblatt & M.P.de Vos, indigenous
  - Gladiolus saccatus (Klatt) Goldblatt & M.P.de Vos subsp. steingroeveri (Klatt) Goldblatt & M.P.de Vos, accepted as Gladiolus saccatus (Klatt) Goldblatt & M.P.de Vos
- Gladiolus salteri G.J.Lewis. endemic
- Gladiolus saundersii Hook.f.indigenous
- Gladiolus saxatilis Goldblatt & J.C.Manning. endemic
- Gladiolus scabridus Goldblatt & J.C.Manning, indigenous
- Gladiolus scullyi Baker. endemic
- Gladiolus sekukuniensis P.J.D.Winter. endemic
- Gladiolus sempervirens G.J.Lewis. endemic
- Gladiolus sericeovillosus Hook.f. indigenous
  - Gladiolus sericeovillosus Hook.f. forma calvatus (Baker) Oberm. accepted as Gladiolus sericeovillosus Hook.f. subsp. calvatus (Baker) Goldblatt
  - Gladiolus sericeovillosus Hook.f. subsp. calvatus (Baker) Goldblatt, indigenous
  - Gladiolus sericeovillosus Hook.f. subsp. sericeovillosus, indigenous
- Gladiolus serpenticola Goldblatt & J.C.Manning, indigenous
- Gladiolus setifolius L.f. accepted as Lapeirousia divaricata Baker
- Gladiolus silenoides Jacq. accepted as Lapeirousia silenoides (Jacq.) Ker Gawl.
- Gladiolus sparrmanii (Thunb.) N. e.Br. accepted as Freesia sparrmanii (Thunb.) N. e.Br.
- Gladiolus speciosus Thunb. endemic
- Gladiolus splendens (Sweet) Herb. endemic
- Gladiolus stefaniae Oberm. endemic
- Gladiolus stellatus G.J.Lewis. endemic
- Gladiolus stokoei G.J.Lewis. endemic
- Gladiolus subcaeruleus G.J.Lewis. endemic
- Gladiolus sufflavus (G.J.Lewis) Goldblatt & J.C.Manning. endemic
- Gladiolus symonsii F.Bolus.indigenous
- Gladiolus taubertianus Schltr. endemic
- Gladiolus tenellus Jacq. accepted as Gladiolus carinatus Aiton
- Gladiolus teretifolius Goldblatt & M.P.de Vos. endemic
- Gladiolus trichonemifolius Ker Gawl. endemic
- Gladiolus tristis L. endemic
  - Gladiolus tristis L. var. aestivalis (Ingram) G.J.Lewis. accepted as Gladiolus tristis L.
  - Gladiolus tristis L. var. concolor (Salisb.) Baker. accepted as Gladiolus tristis L.
- Gladiolus uitenhagensis Goldblatt & Vlok. endemic
- Gladiolus umbellatus Schrank. accepted as Ixia dubia Vent, indigenous
- Gladiolus undulatus L. endemic
- Gladiolus uysiae L.Bolus ex G.J.Lewis. endemic
- Gladiolus vaginatus F.Bolus. endemic
  - Gladiolus vaginatus F.Bolus subsp. subtilis Oberm. accepted as Gladiolus vaginatus F.Bolus
- Gladiolus vandermerwei (L.Bolus) Goldblatt & M.P.de Vos. endemic
- Gladiolus variegatus (G.J.Lewis) Goldblatt & J.C.Manning. endemic
- Gladiolus varius F.Bolus, indigenous
  - Gladiolus varius F.Bolus var. micranthus (Baker) Oberm. accepted as Gladiolus ferrugineus Goldblatt & J.C.Manning
- Gladiolus venustus G.J.Lewis. endemic
- Gladiolus vernus Oberm, indigenous
- Gladiolus vigilans Barnard. endemic
- Gladiolus vinosomaculatus Kies. endemic
- Gladiolus violaceolineatus G.J.Lewis. endemic
  - Gladiolus virescens]] Thunb. endemic
  - Gladiolus virescens Thunb. var. lepidus G.J.Lewis. accepted as Gladiolus virescens Thunb.
  - Gladiolus virescens Thunb. var. roseovenosus G.J.Lewis. accepted as Gladiolus virescens Thunb.
- Gladiolus virgatus Goldblatt & J.C.Manning. endemic
- Gladiolus viridiflorus G.J.Lewis. endemic
- Gladiolus viridis Aiton. accepted as Freesia viridis (Aiton) Goldblatt & J.C.Manning subsp. viridis
- Gladiolus watermeyeri L.Bolus. endemic
- Gladiolus watsonius Thunb. endemic
  - Gladiolus watsonius Thunb. var. maculosus M.P.de Vos & Goldblatt. accepted as Gladiolus watsonius Thunb.
- Gladiolus wilsonii (Baker) Goldblatt & J.C.Manning. endemic
- Gladiolus woodii Baker, indigenous
- Gladiolus xanthospilus DC. accepted as Freesia caryophyllacea (Burm.f.) N. e.Br.

== Gynandriris ==
Genus Gynandriris:

- Gynandriris anomala Goldblatt. accepted as Moraea contorta Goldblatt
- Gynandriris australis Goldblatt. accepted as Moraea australis (Goldblatt) Goldblatt
- Gynandriris cedarmontana Goldblatt. accepted as Moraea cedarmontana (Goldblatt) Goldblatt
- Gynandriris hesperantha Goldblatt. accepted as Moraea hesperantha (Goldblatt) Goldblatt
- Gynandriris pritzeliana (Diels) Goldblatt. accepted as Moraea pritzeliana Diels
- Gynandriris setifolia (L.f.) R.C.Foster. accepted as Moraea setifolia (L.f.) Druce
- Gynandriris simulans (Baker) R.C.Foster. accepted as Moraea simulans Baker

== Hesperantha ==
Genus Hesperantha:

- Hesperantha acuta (Licht. ex Roem. & Schult.) Ker Gawl. endemic
  - Hesperantha acuta (Licht. ex Roem. & Schult.) Ker Gawl. subsp. acuta, endemic
  - Hesperantha acuta (Licht. ex Roem. & Schult.) Ker Gawl. subsp. tugwelliae (R.C.Foster) Goldblatt & J, endemic
- Hesperantha alborosea Hilliard & B.L.Burtt, endemic
- Hesperantha altimontana Goldblatt, indigenous
- Hesperantha bachmannii Baker, endemic
- Hesperantha baurii Baker, indigenous
  - Hesperantha baurii Baker subsp. baurii, indigenous
  - Hesperantha baurii Baker subsp. formosa Hilliard & B.L.Burtt, indigenous
- Hesperantha bracteolata R.C.Foster, accepted as Hesperantha pilosa (L.f.) Ker Gawl. subsp. bracteolata (R.C.Foster) Goldblatt & J.C.Manning
- Hesperantha brevicaulis (Baker) G.J.Lewis, endemic
- Hesperantha brevifolia Goldblatt, endemic
- Hesperantha brevistyla Goldblatt, indigenous
- Hesperantha bulbifera Baker, endemic
- Hesperantha candida Baker, indigenous
- Hesperantha cedarmontana Goldblatt, endemic
- Hesperantha ciliolata Goldblatt, accepted as Hesperantha pilosa (L.f.) Ker Gawl. subsp. bracteolata (R.C.Foster) Goldblatt & J.C.Manning, endemic
- Hesperantha coccinea (Backh. & Harv.) Goldblatt & J.C.Manning, indigenous
- Hesperantha cucullata Klatt, endemic
- Hesperantha curvula Hilliard & B.L.Burtt, endemic
- Hesperantha debilis Goldblatt, endemic
- Hesperantha decipiens Goldblatt, endemic
- Hesperantha discolor N.E.Br. accepted as Hesperantha acuta (Licht. ex Roem. & Schult.) Ker Gawl. subsp. acuta
- Hesperantha dolomitica Goldblatt & J.C.Manning, indigenous
- Hesperantha elsiae Goldblatt, endemic
- Hesperantha erecta (Baker) Benth. ex Baker, endemic
- Hesperantha eremophila Goldblatt & J.C.Manning, endemic
- Hesperantha falcata (L.f.) Ker Gawl. endemic
  - Hesperantha falcata (L.f.) Ker Gawl. subsp. falcata, endemic
  - Hesperantha falcata (L.f.) Ker Gawl. subsp. lutea (Benth. ex Baker) Goldblatt & J.C.Manning, endemic
- Hesperantha fibrosa Baker, endemic
- Hesperantha filiformis Goldblatt & J.C.Manning, endemic
- Hesperantha flava G.J.Lewis, endemic
- Hesperantha flexuosa Klatt, endemic
- Hesperantha galpinii R.C.Foster, accepted as Hesperantha woodii Baker
- Hesperantha glabrescens Goldblatt, endemic
- Hesperantha glareosa Hilliard & B.L.Burtt, indigenous
- Hesperantha gracilis Baker, endemic
- Hesperantha grandiflora G.J.Lewis, indigenous
- Hesperantha hantamensis Schltr. ex R.C.Foster, endemic
- Hesperantha helmei Goldblatt & J.C.Manning, endemic
- Hesperantha humilis Baker, endemic
- Hesperantha hutchingsiae Hilliard & B.L.Burtt, endemic
- Hesperantha huttonii (Baker) Hilliard & B.L.Burtt, endemic
- Hesperantha hygrophila Hilliard & B.L.Burtt, indigenous
- Hesperantha inconspicua (Baker) Goldblatt, endemic
- Hesperantha ingeliensis Hilliard & B.L.Burtt, endemic
- Hesperantha juncifolia Goldblatt, endemic
- Hesperantha karooica Goldblatt, endemic
- Hesperantha kiaratayloriae Goldblatt & J.C.Manning, endemic
- Hesperantha lactea Baker, endemic
- Hesperantha latifolia (Klatt) M.P.de Vos, endemic
- Hesperantha laxifolia Goldblatt & J.C.Manning, indigenous
- Hesperantha leucantha Baker, indigenous
- Hesperantha lithicola J.C.Manning & Goldblatt, endemic
- Hesperantha longicollis Baker, indigenous
- Hesperantha longituba (Klatt) Baker, indigenous
- Hesperantha lutea Benth. ex Baker, accepted as Hesperantha falcata (L.f.) Ker Gawl. subsp. lutea (Benth. ex Baker) Goldblatt & J.C.Manning, indigenous
  - Hesperantha lutea Benth. ex Baker var. luculenta R.C.Foster, accepted as Hesperantha falcata (L.f.) Ker Gawl. subsp. lutea (Benth. ex Baker) Goldblatt & J.C.Manning, indigenous
- Hesperantha luticola Goldblatt, endemic
- Hesperantha malvina Goldblatt, endemic
- Hesperantha marlothii R.C.Foster, endemic
- Hesperantha minima (Baker) R.C.Foster, endemic
- Hesperantha modesta Baker, endemic
- Hesperantha montigena Goldblatt, endemic
- Hesperantha muirii (L.Bolus) G.J.Lewis, endemic
- Hesperantha namaquana Goldblatt, endemic
- Hesperantha oligantha (Diels) Goldblatt, endemic
- Hesperantha pallescens Goldblatt, endemic
- Hesperantha palustris Goldblatt & J.C.Manning, endemic
- Hesperantha pauciflora (Baker) G.J.Lewis, endemic
- Hesperantha pilosa (L.f.) Ker Gawl. endemic
  - Hesperantha pilosa (L.f.) Ker Gawl. subsp. bracteolata (R.C.Foster) Goldblatt & J.C.Manning, indigenous
  - Hesperantha pilosa (L.f.) Ker Gawl. subsp. pilosa, indigenous
- Hesperantha pseudopilosa Goldblatt, endemic
- Hesperantha puberula R.C.Foster, accepted as Hesperantha pilosa (L.f.) Ker Gawl. subsp. bracteolata (R.C.Foster) Goldblatt & J.C.Manning, indigenous
- Hesperantha pubinervia Hilliard & B.L.Burtt, endemic
- Hesperantha pulchra Baker, endemic
- Hesperantha purpurea Goldblatt, endemic
- Hesperantha quadrangula Goldblatt, endemic
- Hesperantha radiata (Jacq.) Ker Gawl. indigenous
  - Hesperantha radiata (Jacq.) Ker Gawl. subsp. radiata, endemic
- Hesperantha rivulicola Goldblatt, endemic
- Hesperantha rupestris N.E.Br. ex R.C.Foster, endemic
- Hesperantha rupicola Goldblatt, endemic
- Hesperantha saldanhae Goldblatt, endemic
- Hesperantha saxicola Goldblatt, endemic
- Hesperantha schelpeana Hilliard & B.L.Burtt, indigenous
- Hesperantha schlechteri (Baker) R.C.Foster, endemic
- Hesperantha scopulosa Hilliard & B.L.Burtt, indigenous
- Hesperantha secunda Goldblatt & J.C.Manning, endemic
- Hesperantha similis N.E.Br. ex R.C.Foster, accepted as Hesperantha schlechteri (Baker) R.C.Foster
- Hesperantha spicata (Burm.f.) N.E.Br. endemic
  - Hesperantha spicata (Burm.f.) N.E.Br. subsp. fistulosa (Baker) Goldblatt, endemic
  - Hesperantha spicata (Burm.f.) N.E.Br. subsp. graminifolia (Sweet) Goldblatt, endemic
  - Hesperantha spicata (Burm.f.) N.E.Br. subsp. spicata, endemic
- Hesperantha stenosiphon Goldblatt, endemic
- Hesperantha sufflava Goldblatt, endemic
- Hesperantha teretifolia Goldblatt, endemic
- Hesperantha truncatula Goldblatt, endemic
- Hesperantha tysonii Baker, accepted as Hesperantha radiata (Jacq.) Ker Gawl.
- Hesperantha vaginata (Sweet) Goldblatt, endemic
- Hesperantha vernalis Hilliard & B.L.Burtt, accepted as Hesperantha candida Baker
- Hesperantha woodii Baker, indigenous

== Hexaglottis ==
Genus Hexaglottis:

- Hexaglottis brevituba Goldblatt, accepted as Moraea brevituba (Goldblatt) Goldblatt
- Hexaglottis lewisiae Goldblatt subsp. lewisiae, accepted as Moraea lewisiae (Goldblatt) Goldblatt subsp. lewisiae
  - Hexaglottis lewisiae Goldblatt subsp. secunda Goldblatt, accepted as Moraea lewisiae (Goldblatt) Goldblatt subsp. secunda (Goldblatt) Goldblatt
- Hexaglottis longifolia (Jacq.) Salisb. accepted as Moraea longifolia (Jacq.) Pers.
- Hexaglottis namaquana Goldblatt, accepted as Moraea namaquana (Goldblatt) Goldblatt
- Hexaglottis nana L.Bolus, accepted as Moraea nana (L.Bolus) Goldblatt & J.C.Manning
- Hexaglottis riparia Goldblatt, accepted as Moraea riparia (Goldblatt) Goldblatt
- Hexaglottis virgata (Jacq.) Sweet subsp. karooica Goldblatt, accepted as Moraea virgata Jacq. subsp. karooica (Goldblatt) Goldblatt
- Hexaglottis virgata (Jacq.) Sweet subsp. virgata, accepted as Moraea virgata Jacq. subsp. virgata

== Homeria ==
Genus Homeria:

- Homeria autumnalis Goldblatt, accepted as Moraea autumnalis (Goldblatt) Goldblatt
- Homeria bifida L.Bolus, accepted as Moraea bifida (L.Bolus) Goldblatt
- Homeria bolusiae Goldblatt, accepted as Moraea louisabolusiae Goldblatt
- Homeria brachygyne Schltr. accepted as Moraea brachygyne (Schltr.) Goldblatt
- Homeria britteniae L.Bolus, accepted as Moraea britteniae (L.Bolus) Goldblatt
- Homeria bulbillifera G.J.Lewis subsp. anomala Goldblatt, accepted as Moraea bulbillifera (G.J.Lewis) Goldblatt subsp. anomala (Goldblatt) Goldblatt
- Homeria bulbillifera G.J.Lewis subsp. bulbillifera, accepted as Moraea bulbillifera (G.J.Lewis) Goldblatt subsp. bulbillifera
- Homeria cedarmontana Goldblatt, accepted as Moraea cedarmonticola Goldblatt
- Homeria collina (Thunb.) Salisb. accepted as Moraea collina Thunb.
- Homeria comptonii L.Bolus, accepted as Moraea comptonii (L.Bolus) Goldblatt
- Homeria cookii L.Bolus, accepted as Moraea cookii (L.Bolus) Goldblatt
- Homeria elegans (Jacq.) Sweet, accepted as Moraea elegans Jacq.
- Homeria fenestrata Goldblatt, accepted as Moraea fenestrata (Goldblatt) Goldblatt
- Homeria flaccida Sweet, accepted as Moraea flaccida (Sweet) Steud.
- Homeria flavescens Goldblatt, accepted as Moraea flavescens (Goldblatt) Goldblatt
- Homeria fuscomontana Goldblatt, accepted as Moraea fuscomontana (Goldblatt) Goldblatt
- Homeria galpinii L.Bolus, accepted as Moraea pyrophila Goldblatt
- Homeria hantamensis Goldblatt & J.C.Manning, accepted as Moraea reflexa Goldblatt
- Homeria longistyla Goldblatt, accepted as Moraea longistyla (Goldblatt) Goldblatt
- Homeria marlothii L.Bolus, accepted as Moraea marlothii (L.Bolus) Goldblatt
- Homeria miniata (Andrews) Sweet, accepted as Moraea miniata Andrews
- Homeria minor (Eckl.) Goldblatt, accepted as Moraea minor Eckl.
- Homeria ochroleuca Salisb. accepted as Moraea ochroleuca (Salisb.) Drapiez
- Homeria odorata L.Bolus, accepted as Moraea fragrans Goldblatt
- Homeria pallida Baker, accepted as Moraea pallida (Baker) Goldblatt
- Homeria patens Goldblatt, accepted as Moraea patens (Goldblatt) Goldblatt
- Homeria pendula Goldblatt, accepted as Moraea pendula (Goldblatt) Goldblatt
- Homeria radians (Goldblatt) Goldblatt, accepted as Moraea radians (Goldblatt) Goldblatt
- Homeria ramosissima Schltr. accepted as Moraea knersvlaktensis Goldblatt
- Homeria schlechteri L.Bolus, accepted as Moraea schlechteri (L.Bolus) Goldblatt
- Homeria serratostyla Goldblatt, accepted as Moraea serratostyla (Goldblatt) Goldblatt
- Homeria spiralis L.Bolus, accepted as Moraea aspera Goldblatt
- Homeria tenuis Schltr. accepted as Moraea demissa Goldblatt
- Homeria tricolor G.J.Lewis, accepted as Moraea karroica Goldblatt
- Homeria vallisbelli Goldblatt, accepted as Moraea vallisbelli (Goldblatt) Goldblatt

== Homoglossum ==
Genus Homoglossum:

- Homoglossum merianellum (Thunb.) Baker, accepted as Gladiolus merianellus (L.) Thunb. indigenous
- Homoglossum merianellum (Thunb.) Baker var. aureum G.J.Lewis, accepted as Gladiolus merianellus (L.) Thunb. indigenous

== Huouttuynia ==
Genus Houttuynia:

- Houttuynia capensis Houtt. accepted as Ixia paniculata D.Delaroche, indigenous

== Hyalis ==
Genus Hyalis:

- Hyalis aulica (Aiton) Salisb. accepted as Ixia latifolia D.Delaroche, indigenous
- Hyalis latifolia (D.Delaroche) Salisb. accepted as Ixia latifolia D.Delaroche, indigenous
- Hyalis longiflora (P.J.Bergius) Salisb. accepted as Ixia paniculata D.Delaroche, indigenous
- Hyalis marginifolia Salisb. accepted as Ixia marginifolia Salisb. ex G.J.Lewis, indigenous

== Iris ==
Genus Iris:

- Iris pseudacorus L. not indigenous, cultivated, invasive

== Ixia ==
Genus Ixia:

- Ixia abbreviata Houtt. endemic
  - Ixia abbreviata Houtt. var. ovata (Andrews) Goldblatt & J.C.Manning, accepted as Ixia abbreviata Houtt. endemic
- Ixia acaulis Goldblatt & J.C.Manning, endemic
- Ixia alata Goldblatt & J.C.Manning, endemic
- Ixia alba Eckl. accepted as Ixia orientalis L.Bolus, indigenous
- Ixia alboflavens Eckl. accepted as Ixia abbreviata Houtt. indigenous
- Ixia alticola Goldblatt & J.C.Manning, endemic
- Ixia altissima Goldblatt & J.C.Manning, endemic
- Ixia amethystina J.C.Manning & Goldblatt, accepted as Ixia brevituba G.J.Lewis, endemic
- Ixia amoena Salisb. accepted as Ixia maculata L. indigenous
- Ixia angelae Goldblatt & J.C.Manning, endemic
- Ixia angusta L.Bolus, accepted as Ixia patens Aiton, indigenous
- Ixia angustifolia (Andrews) Klatt, accepted as Ixia monadelpha D.Delaroche, indigenous
- Ixia aristata Thunb. accepted as Ixia campanulata Houtt. indigenous
  - Ixia aristata Thunb. var. elegans (Regel) Baker, accepted as Ixia polystachya L. indigenous
- Ixia atrandra Goldblatt & J.C.Manning, endemic
- Ixia aulica Aiton, accepted as Ixia latifolia D.Delaroche, indigenous
- Ixia aurea J.C.Manning & Goldblatt, endemic
- Ixia avellana R.C.Foster, accepted as Ixia odorata Ker Gawl. indigenous
- Ixia bellendenii R.C.Foster, endemic
- Ixia bifolia Goldblatt & J.C.Manning, endemic
- Ixia bolusii G.J.Lewis, accepted as Ixia paucifolia G.J.Lewis, indigenous
- Ixia brevituba G.J.Lewis, endemic
- Ixia brunneobractea G.J.Lewis, endemic
- Ixia calendulacea Goldblatt & J.C.Manning, endemic
- Ixia campanulata Houtt. endemic
- Ixia cana Eckl. accepted as Ixia viridiflora Lam. indigenous
- Ixia candida Delile, accepted as Ixia leucantha Jacq. indigenous
- Ixia capillaris L.f. endemic
  - Ixia capillaris L.f. var. aulica (Aiton) Ker Gawl. accepted as Ixia latifolia D.Delaroche, indigenous
  - Ixia capillaris L.f. var. gracillima Ker Gawl. accepted as Ixia capillaris L.f. indigenous
  - Ixia capillaris L.f. var. incarnata (Jacq.) Ker Gawl. accepted as Ixia latifolia D.Delaroche, indigenous
  - Ixia capillaris L.f. var. lancea (Jacq.) Ker Gawl. accepted as Ixia marginifolia Salisb. ex G.J.Lewis, indigenous
  - Ixia capillaris L.f. var. stricta Ker Gawl. accepted as Ixia marginifolia Salisb. ex G.J.Lewis, indigenous
- Ixia capitata Andrews, accepted as Ixia maculata L. indigenous
  - Ixia capitata Andrews var. ovata Andrews, accepted as Ixia abbreviata Houtt. indigenous
  - Ixia capitata Andrews var. stellata Andrews, accepted as Ixia divaricata Goldblatt & J.C.Manning, indigenous
- Ixia cartilaginea Lam. accepted as Ixia monadelpha D.Delaroche, indigenous
- Ixia caryophyllacea Burm.f. accepted as Freesia caryophyllacea (Burm.f.) N.E.Br.
- Ixia cedarmontana Goldblatt & J.C.Manning, endemic
- Ixia coccinea Eckl. accepted as Ixia campanulata Houtt. indigenous
- Ixia coccinea Thunb. accepted as Ixia campanulata Houtt. indigenous
- Ixia cochlearis G.J.Lewis, endemic
- Ixia collina Goldblatt & Snijman, endemic
- Ixia columellaris Ker Gawl. accepted as Ixia monadelpha D.Delaroche, indigenous
- Ixia columnaris Salisb. accepted as Ixia monadelpha D.Delaroche, indigenous
  - Ixia columnaris Salisb. var. angustifolia Andrews, accepted as Ixia monadelpha D.Delaroche, indigenous
  - Ixia columnaris Salisb. var. grandiflora Andrews, accepted as Ixia monadelpha D.Delaroche, indigenous
  - Ixia columnaris Salisb. var. latifolia Andrews, accepted as Ixia monadelpha D.Delaroche, indigenous
  - Ixia columnaris Salisb. var. purpurea Andrews, accepted as Ixia monadelpha D.Delaroche, indigenous
  - Ixia columnaris Salisb. var. rhodolarynx Baker, accepted as Ixia monadelpha D.Delaroche, indigenous
  - Ixia columnaris Salisb. var. versicolor Andrews, accepted as Ixia monadelpha D.Delaroche, indigenous
- Ixia concolor Salisb. accepted as Ixia campanulata Houtt. indigenous
- Ixia conferta R.C.Foster, accepted as Ixia abbreviata Houtt. indigenous
  - Ixia conferta R.C.Foster var. ochroleuca (Ker Gawl.) G.J.Lewis, accepted as Ixia abbreviata Houtt. indigenous
- Ixia confusa (G.J.Lewis) Goldblatt & J.C.Manning, endemic
- Ixia conica Salisb. accepted as Ixia maculata L. indigenous
- Ixia contorta Goldblatt & J.C.Manning, endemic
- Ixia corymbosa L. accepted as Codonorhiza corymbosa (L.) Goldblatt & J.C.Manning
- Ixia crateroides Ker Gawl. accepted as Ixia campanulata Houtt. indigenous
- Ixia crispa L.f. accepted as Tritonia undulata (Burm.f.) Baker, indigenous
- Ixia crispifolia Andrews, accepted as Codonorhiza corymbosa (L.) Goldblatt & J.C.Manning
- Ixia curta Andrews, endemic
- Ixia curvata G.J.Lewis, endemic
- Ixia densiflora Klatt, accepted as Ixia patens Aiton, indigenous
- Ixia dieramoides Goldblatt & J.C.Manning, endemic
- Ixia dispar N.E.Br. accepted as Ixia patens Aiton, indigenous
- Ixia divaricata Goldblatt & J.C.Manning, endemic
- Ixia dolichosiphon Goldblatt & J.C.Manning, endemic
- Ixia dubia Vent. endemic
- Ixia duckittiae L.Bolus, accepted as Ixia maculata L. indigenous
- Ixia ecklonii Goldblatt & J.C.Manning, endemic
- Ixia elegans (Regel) N.E.Br. accepted as Ixia polystachya L. indigenous
- Ixia elliptica Thunb. accepted as Freesia verrucosa (B.Vogel) Goldblatt & J.C.Manning
- Ixia emarginata Lam. accepted as Freesia verrucosa (B.Vogel) Goldblatt & J.C.Manning
- Ixia erecta P.J.Bergius, accepted as Ixia polystachya L. indigenous
- Ixia erecta Thunb. accepted as Ixia odorata Ker Gawl. indigenous
  - Ixia erecta Thunb. var. lutea-odorata Ker Gawl. accepted as Ixia odorata Ker Gawl. indigenous
- Ixia erubescens Goldblatt, endemic
- Ixia esterhuyseniae M.P.de Vos, endemic
- Ixia exiliflora Goldblatt & J.C.Manning, endemic
- Ixia fastigiata Lam. accepted as Lapeirousia fastigiata (Lam.) Ker Gawl.
- Ixia filiformis Vent. accepted as Ixia patens Aiton, indigenous
- Ixia flaccida (G.J.Lewis) Goldblatt & J.C.Manning, accepted as Ixia mollis Goldblatt & J.C.Manning, endemic
- Ixia flaccida Salisb. accepted as Ixia patens Aiton, indigenous
- Ixia flagellaris Goldblatt & J.C.Manning, endemic
- Ixia flava Hornem. accepted as Ixia maculata L. indigenous
- Ixia flavescens Eckl. accepted as Ixia odorata Ker Gawl. indigenous
- Ixia flexuosa L. endemic
  - Ixia flexuosa Mill. accepted as Ixia flexuosa L. indigenous
- Ixia framesii L.Bolus, accepted as Ixia tenuifolia Vahl, indigenous
- Ixia frederickii M.P.de Vos, accepted as Ixia dubia Vent. indigenous
- Ixia fucata Ker Gawl. endemic
  - Ixia fucata Ker Gawl. var. filifolia G.J.Lewis, accepted as Ixia stenophylla Goldblatt & J.C.Manning, indigenous
- Ixia fuscocitrina Desf. ex DC. endemic
- Ixia galaxioides Klatt, accepted as Ixia monadelpha D.Delaroche, indigenous
- Ixia gawleri Schrad. accepted as Freesia verrucosa (B.Vogel) Goldblatt & J.C.Manning
- Ixia gladiolaris Lam. accepted as Tritonia gladiolaris (Lam.) Goldblatt & J.C.Manning, indigenous
- Ixia gloriosa G.J.Lewis, endemic
- Ixia gracilis Salisb. accepted as Ixia capillaris L.f. indigenous
- Ixia grandiflora (Andrews) Pers. accepted as Ixia monadelpha D.Delaroche, indigenous
- Ixia helmei Goldblatt & J.C.Manning, endemic
- Ixia heterophylla Willd. accepted as Lapeirousia plicata (Jacq.) Diels subsp. plicata
- Ixia incarnata Jacq. accepted as Ixia latifolia D.Delaroche, indigenous
- Ixia lacerata Goldblatt & J.C.Manning, endemic
- Ixia lancea Jacq. accepted as Ixia marginifolia Salisb. ex G.J.Lewis, indigenous
- Ixia latifolia D.Delaroche, endemic
  - Ixia latifolia D.Delaroche var. angustifolia G.J.Lewis, accepted as Ixia divaricata Goldblatt & J.C.Manning, endemic
  - Ixia latifolia D.Delaroche var. curviramosa G.J.Lewis, accepted as Ixia latifolia D.Delaroche, endemic
  - Ixia latifolia D.Delaroche var. parviflora G.J.Lewis, accepted as Ixia parva Goldblatt & J.C.Manning, endemic
  - Ixia latifolia D.Delaroche var. ramulosa G.J.Lewis, accepted as Ixia ramulosa (G.J.Lewis) Goldblatt & J.C.Manning, endemic
- Ixia leipoldtii G.J.Lewis, endemic
- Ixia leucantha Jacq. endemic
  - Ixia leucantha Jacq. var. aristata (Thunb.) Baker, accepted as Ixia campanulata Houtt. indigenous
- Ixia linderi Goldblatt & J.C.Manning, endemic
- Ixia linearifolia Goldblatt & J.C.Manning, endemic
- Ixia longiflora Lam. accepted as Ixia paniculata D.Delaroche, indigenous
  - Ixia longiflora P.J.Bergius, accepted as Ixia paniculata D.Delaroche, indigenous
- Ixia longistylis (M.P.de Vos) Goldblatt & J.C.Manning, endemic
- Ixia longituba N.E.Br. endemic
  - Ixia longituba N.E.Br. subsp. longituba, endemic
  - Ixia longituba N.E.Br. subsp. macrosiphon Goldblatt & J.C.Manning, endemic
  - Ixia longituba N.E.Br. var. bellendenii (R.C.Foster) M.P.de Vos, accepted as Ixia bellendenii R.C.Foster, endemic
- Ixia lutea Eckl. accepted as Ixia abbreviata Houtt. indigenous
  - Ixia lutea Eckl. var. ovata (Andrews) B.Nord. accepted as Ixia abbreviata Houtt. endemic
- Ixia macrocarpa Goldblatt & J.C.Manning, endemic
- Ixia maculata L. endemic
  - Ixia maculata L. var. amethystina Ker Gawl. accepted as Ixia viridiflora Lam. indigenous
  - Ixia maculata L. var. caesia Ker Gawl. accepted as Ixia polystachya L. indigenous
  - Ixia maculata L. var. fuscocitrina (Desf. ex DC.) G.J.Lewis, accepted as Ixia fuscocitrina Desf. ex DC. endemic
  - Ixia maculata L. var. intermedia G.J.Lewis, accepted as Ixia calendulacea Goldblatt & J.C.Manning, endemic
  - Ixia maculata L. var. nigroalbida (Klatt) Baker, accepted as Ixia abbreviata Houtt. indigenous
  - Ixia maculata L. var. ochroleuca Ker Gawl. accepted as Ixia abbreviata Houtt. indigenous
  - Ixia maculata L. var. viridis Jacq. accepted as Ixia viridiflora Lam. indigenous
  - Ixia maculata L. var. viridis Ker Gawl. accepted as Ixia viridiflora Lam. indigenous
- Ixia marginifolia Salisb. ex G.J.Lewis, endemic
- Ixia metelerkampiae L.Bolus, endemic
- Ixia micrandra Baker, endemic
  - Ixia micrandra Baker var. confusa G.J.Lewis, accepted as Ixia confusa (G.J.Lewis) Goldblatt & J.C.Manning, endemic
  - Ixia micrandra Baker var. minor G.J.Lewis, accepted as Ixia minor (G.J.Lewis) Goldblatt & J.C.Manning, endemic
- Ixia milleri P.J.Bergius, accepted as Ixia maculata L. indigenous
- Ixia minor (G.J.Lewis) Goldblatt & J.C.Manning, endemic
- Ixia mollis Goldblatt & J.C.Manning, endemic
- Ixia monadelpha D.Delaroche, endemic
- Ixia monadelpha D.Delaroche var. curta (Andrews) Ker Gawl. accepted as Ixia curta Andrews, indigenous
- Ixia monticola Goldblatt & J.C.Manning, endemic
- Ixia mostertii M.P.de Vos, endemic
- Ixia namaquana L.Bolus, endemic
- Ixia nigroalbida Klatt, accepted as Ixia abbreviata Houtt. indigenous
- Ixia ochroleuca (Ker Gawl.) Sweet, accepted as Ixia abbreviata Houtt. indigenous
- Ixia odorata Ker Gawl. endemic
  - Ixia odorata Ker Gawl. var. hesperanthoides G.J.Lewis, accepted as Ixia odorata Ker Gawl. endemic
- Ixia orientalis L.Bolus, endemic
- Ixia ovata (Andrews) Sweet var. stellata (Andrews) Baker, accepted as Ixia divaricata Goldblatt & J.C.Manning, indigenous
- Ixia oxalidiflora Goldblatt & J.C.Manning, endemic
- Ixia pallideflavens Eckl. accepted as Ixia maculata L. indigenous
- Ixia paniculata D.Delaroche, endemic
  - Ixia paniculata D.Delaroche var. rochensis (Ker Gawl.) Baker, accepted as Ixia bellendenii R.C.Foster, indigenous
  - Ixia paniculata D.Delaroche var. tenuiflora (Vahl) Baker, accepted as Ixia paniculata D.Delaroche, indigenous
- Ixia parva Goldblatt & J.C.Manning, endemic
- Ixia patens Aiton, endemic
  - Ixia patens Aiton var. kermesina Regel, accepted as Ixia patens Aiton, indigenous
  - Ixia patens Aiton var. leucantha (Jacq.) Ker Gawl. accepted as Ixia leucantha Jacq. indigenous
  - Ixia patens Aiton var. linearifolia G.J.Lewis, accepted as Ixia patens Aiton, endemic
- Ixia pauciflora G.J.Lewis, endemic
- Ixia paucifolia G.J.Lewis, endemic
- Ixia pavonia Goldblatt & J.C.Manning, endemic
- Ixia pentandra L.f. accepted as Ixia scillaris L. subsp. scillaris, indigenous
- Ixia phlogiflora Delile, accepted as Ixia latifolia D.Delaroche, indigenous
- Ixia polystachya L. endemic
  - Ixia polystachya L. var. crassifolia G.J.Lewis, accepted as Ixia polystachya L. endemic
  - Ixia polystachya L. var. flavescens (Eckl.) Baker, accepted as Ixia odorata Ker Gawl. indigenous
  - Ixia polystachya L. var. incarnata Andr. accepted as Ixia scillaris L. subsp. latifolia Goldblatt & J.C.Manning, indigenous
  - Ixia polystachya L. var. longistylis M.P.de Vos, accepted as Ixia longistylis (M.P.de Vos) Goldblatt & J.C.Manning, endemic
  - Ixia polystachya L. var. lutea (Ker Gawl.) G.J.Lewis, accepted as Ixia erecta Thunb. var. lutea Ker Gawl. endemic
- Ixia polystacia Mill. accepted as Ixia polystachya L. indigenous
- Ixia prasina Sol. ex Baker, accepted as Ixia viridiflora Lam. indigenous
- Ixia pulcherrima Eckl. accepted as Ixia tenuifolia Vahl, indigenous
- Ixia pulchra Salisb. accepted as Ixia viridiflora Lam. indigenous
- Ixia pumilio Goldblatt & Snijman, endemic
- Ixia punicea Eckl. accepted as Ixia patens Aiton, indigenous
- Ixia purpurea (Klatt) Klatt, accepted as Ixia monadelpha D.Delaroche, indigenous
- Ixia purpurea Jacq., accepted as Babiana purpurea Ker Gawl. indigenous
- Ixia purpurea Lam. accepted as Tritonia crocata (L.) Ker Gawl. indigenous
- Ixia purpureorosea G.J.Lewis, endemic
- Ixia pyramidalis Lam. accepted as Lapeirousia pyramidalis (Lam.) Goldblatt subsp. pyramidalis
- Ixia ramulosa (G.J.Lewis) Goldblatt & J.C.Manning, endemic
- Ixia rapunculoides Delile, endemic
  - Ixia rapunculoides Delile var. flaccida G.J.Lewis, accepted as Ixia mollis Goldblatt & J.C.Manning, endemic
  - Ixia rapunculoides Delile var. namaquana (L.Bolus) G.J.Lewis, accepted as Ixia namaquana L.Bolus, endemic
  - Ixia rapunculoides Delile var. rigida G.J.Lewis, accepted as Ixia divaricata Goldblatt & J.C.Manning, endemic
  - Ixia rapunculoides Delile var. robusta G.J.Lewis, accepted as Ixia robusta (G.J.Lewis) Goldblatt & J.C.Manning, endemic
  - Ixia rapunculoides Delile var. subpendula G.J.Lewis, accepted as Ixia divaricata Goldblatt & J.C.Manning, endemic
- Ixia reclinata Goldblatt & J.C.Manning, endemic
- Ixia recondita Goldblatt & J.C.Manning, endemic
- Ixia reflexa Andr. accepted as Ixia scillaris L. subsp. latifolia Goldblatt & J.C.Manning, indigenous
- Ixia rigida Goldblatt & J.C.Manning, endemic
- Ixia rivulicola Goldblatt & J.C.Manning, endemic
- Ixia robusta (G.J.Lewis) Goldblatt & J.C.Manning, endemic
- Ixia rochensis (Ker Gawl.) L.Bolus, accepted as Ixia bellendenii R.C.Foster, indigenous
- Ixia rochensis Ker Gawl. accepted as Geissorhiza radians (Thunb.) Goldblatt, indigenous
- Ixia roseoalba Goldblatt & J.C.Manning, endemic
- Ixia rotata Ker Gawl. accepted as Ixia scillaris L. subsp. latifolia Goldblatt & J.C.Manning, indigenous
- Ixia rouxii G.J.Lewis, endemic
- Ixia sarmentosa Goldblatt & J.C.Manning, endemic
- Ixia saundersiana Goldblatt & J.C.Manning, endemic
- Ixia scariosa Thunb. accepted as Ixia latifolia D.Delaroche, indigenous
  - Ixia scariosa Thunb. var. longifolia Baker, accepted as Ixia divaricata Goldblatt & J.C.Manning, indigenous
  - Ixia scariosa Thunb. var. longifolia Baker, accepted as Ixia orientalis L.Bolus, indigenous
- Ixia scillaris L. endemic
  - Ixia scillaris L. subsp. latifolia Goldblatt & J.C.Manning, endemic
  - Ixia scillaris L. subsp. scillaris, endemic
  - Ixia scillaris L. subsp. toximontana Goldblatt & J.C.Manning, endemic
  - Ixia scillaris L. var. angustifolia Ker Gawl. accepted as Ixia scillaris L. subsp. latifolia Goldblatt & J.C.Manning, indigenous
  - Ixia scillaris L. var. latifolia Ker Gawl. accepted as Ixia scillaris L. subsp. latifolia Goldblatt & J.C.Manning, indigenous
  - Ixia scillaris L. var. subundulata G.J.Lewis, accepted as Ixia scillaris L. subsp. latifolia Goldblatt & J.C.Manning, endemic
- Ixia serotina Salisb. accepted as Ixia polystachya L. indigenous
- Ixia simulans Goldblatt & J.C.Manning, endemic
- Ixia sobolifera Goldblatt & J.C.Manning, endemic
  - Ixia sobolifera Goldblatt & J.C.Manning subsp. albiflora Goldblatt & J.C.Manning, endemic
  - Ixia sobolifera Goldblatt & J.C.Manning subsp. carnea Goldblatt & J.C.Manning, endemic
  - Ixia sobolifera Goldblatt & J.C.Manning subsp. sobolifera, endemic
- Ixia sparrmanii (Thunb.) Roem. & Schult. accepted as Freesia sparrmanii (Thunb.) N.E.Br.
- Ixia speciosa Andrews, accepted as Ixia campanulata Houtt. indigenous
- Ixia spectabilis Salisb. accepted as Ixia viridiflora Lam. indigenous
- Ixia spicata Burm.f. var. viridinigra Andrews, accepted as Ixia viridiflora Lam. indigenous
- Ixia splendida G.J.Lewis, endemic
- Ixia stellata (Andrews) Klatt, accepted as Ixia divaricata Goldblatt & J.C.Manning, indigenous
- Ixia stenophylla Goldblatt & J.C.Manning, endemic
- Ixia stohriae L.Bolus, endemic
- Ixia stolonifera G.J.Lewis, endemic
- Ixia striata Vahl, accepted as Tritonia gladiolaris (Lam.) Goldblatt & J.C.Manning, indigenous
- Ixia stricta (Eckl. ex Klatt) G.J.Lewis, endemic
- Ixia superba J.C.Manning & Goldblatt, endemic
- Ixia tenella Klatt, accepted as Ixia capillaris L.f. indigenous
- Ixia tenuiflora Vahl, accepted as Ixia paniculata D.Delaroche, indigenous
- Ixia tenuifolia Vahl, endemic
- Ixia tenuis Goldblatt & J.C.Manning, endemic
- Ixia teretifolia Goldblatt & J.C.Manning, endemic
- Ixia thomasiae Goldblatt, endemic
- Ixia trifolia G.J.Lewis, endemic
- Ixia trinervata (Baker) G.J.Lewis, endemic
- Ixia vanzijliae L.Bolus, endemic
- Ixia variegata Banks ex Ker Gawl. accepted as Ixia monadelpha D.Delaroche, indigenous
- Ixia verrucosa B.Vogel, accepted as Freesia verrucosa (B.Vogel) Goldblatt & J.C.Manning
- Ixia versicolor G.J.Lewis, endemic
- Ixia vinacea G.J.Lewis, endemic
- Ixia viridiflora Lam. endemic
  - Ixia viridiflora Lam. var. caesia (Ker Gawl.) Baker, accepted as Ixia polystachya L. indigenous
  - Ixia viridiflora Lam. var. cana (Eckl.) Baker, accepted as Ixia viridiflora Lam. indigenous
  - Ixia viridiflora Lam. var. minor M.P.de Vos, accepted as Ixia viridiflora Lam. endemic
- Ixia viridis Thunb. accepted as Ixia viridiflora Lam. indigenous
- Ixia vitellina Eckl. accepted as Ixia maculata L. indigenous

== Klattia ==
Genus Klattia:

- Klattia flava (G.J.Lewis) Goldblatt, endemic
- Klattia partita Baker, endemic
  - Klattia partita Baker var. flava G.J.Lewis, accepted as Klattia flava (G.J.Lewis) Goldblatt
- Klattia stokoei L.Guthrie, endemic

== Lapeirousia ==
Genus Lapeirousia:

- Lapeirousia anceps (L.f.) Ker Gawl. endemic
- Lapeirousia arenicola Schltr. endemic
- Lapeirousia azurea (Eckl. ex Baker) Goldblatt, accepted as Codonorhiza azurea (Eckl. ex Baker) Goldblatt & J.C.Manning, endemic
- Lapeirousia bainesii Baker, accepted as Afrosolen bainesii (Baker) Goldblatt & J.C.Manning, indigenous
- Lapeirousia barklyi Baker, indigenous
- Lapeirousia bracteata (Thunb.) Ker Gawl. accepted as Lapeirousia pyramidalis (Lam.) Goldblatt subsp. pyramidalis
- Lapeirousia burchellii Baker, accepted as Lapeirousia littoralis Baker subsp. littoralis
- Lapeirousia caespitosa (Licht. ex Roem. & Schult.) Baker, accepted as Lapeirousia plicata (Jacq.) Diels subsp. foliosa Goldblatt & J.C.Manning
- Lapeirousia caudata Schinz, accepted as Lapeirousia littoralis Baker, indigenous
- Lapeirousia corymbosa (L.) Ker Gawl. accepted as Codonorhiza corymbosa (L.) Goldblatt & J.C.Manning, endemic
- Lapeirousia dinteri Schinz, accepted as Afrosolen coeruleus (Schinz) Goldblatt & J.C.Manning
- Lapeirousia divaricata Baker, endemic
  - Lapeirousia divaricata Baker var. spinosa Goldblatt, accepted as Lapeirousia spinosa (Goldblatt) Goldblatt & J.C.Manning
  - Lapeirousia divaricata Baker var. tenuis Goldblatt, accepted as Lapeirousia tenuis (Goldblatt) Goldblatt & J.C.Manning
- Lapeirousia dolomitica Dinter, indigenous
  - Lapeirousia dolomitica Dinter subsp. lewisiana (B.Nord.) Goldblatt, accepted as Lapeirousia lewisiana B.Nord. endemic
- Lapeirousia effurcata G.J.Lewis, accepted as Lapeirousia plicata (Jacq.) Diels subsp. effurcata (G.J.Lewis) Goldblatt
- Lapeirousia erythrantha (Klotzsch ex Klatt) Baker, accepted as Afrosolen erythranthus (Klotzsch ex Klatt) Goldblatt & J.C.Manning
- Lapeirousia exilis Goldblatt, endemic
- Lapeirousia fabricii (D.Delaroche) Ker Gawl. endemic
  - Lapeirousia fabricii (D.Delaroche) Ker Gawl. subsp. compressa (Pourr.) Goldblatt & J.C.Manning, indigenous
  - Lapeirousia fabricii (D.Delaroche) Ker Gawl. subsp. fabricii, indigenous
  - Lapeirousia fabricii (D.Delaroche) Ker Gawl. subsp. purpurascens Goldblatt & J.C.Manning, indigenous
- Lapeirousia falcata (L.f.) Ker Gawl. accepted as Codonorhiza falcata (L.f.) Goldblatt & J.C.Manning, endemic
- Lapeirousia fasciculata Ker Gawl. accepted as Lapeirousia plicata (Jacq.) Diels subsp. plicata
- Lapeirousia fastigiata (Lam.) Ker Gawl. endemic
- Lapeirousia galaxioides Baker, accepted as Lapeirousia plicata (Jacq.) Diels subsp. foliosa Goldblatt & J.C.Manning
- Lapeirousia graebneriana Harms, accepted as Freesia laxa (Thunb.) Goldblatt & J.C.Manning subsp. laxa
- Lapeirousia graminifolia (Baker) L.Bolus, accepted as Freesia grandiflora (Baker) Klatt subsp. grandiflora
- Lapeirousia homoidea Klatt, accepted as Lapeirousia pyramidalis (Lam.) Goldblatt subsp. pyramidalis
- Lapeirousia jacquinii N.E.Br. endemic
- Lapeirousia juncea Ker Gawl. accepted as Freesia verrucosa (B.Vogel) Goldblatt & J.C.Manning
- Lapeirousia kalahariensis Goldblatt & J.C.Manning, indigenous
- Lapeirousia kamiesmontana Goldblatt & J.C.Manning, indigenous
- Lapeirousia lewisiana B.Nord. indigenous
- Lapeirousia littoralis Baker, indigenous
  - Lapeirousia littoralis Baker subsp. caudata (Schinz) Goldblatt, indigenous
  - Lapeirousia littoralis Baker subsp. littoralis, indigenous
- Lapeirousia macrospatha Baker, endemic
- Lapeirousia manuleaeflora Eckl. accepted as Codonorhiza micrantha (E.Mey. ex Klatt) Goldblatt & J.C.Manning
- Lapeirousia masukuensis Vaupel & Schltr. accepted as Afrosolen masukuensis (Vaupel & Schltr.) Goldblatt & J.C.Manning, indigenous
- Lapeirousia micrantha (E.Mey. ex Klatt) Baker, accepted as Codonorhiza micrantha (E.Mey. ex Klatt) Goldblatt & J.C.Manning
- Lapeirousia montana Klatt, endemic
- Lapeirousia neglecta Goldblatt, accepted as Schizorhiza neglecta (Goldblatt) Goldblatt & J.C.Manning
- Lapeirousia oreogena Schltr. ex Goldblatt, endemic
- Lapeirousia otaviensis R.C.Foster, accepted as Afrosolen otaviensis (R.C.Foster) Goldblatt & J.C.Manning
- Lapeirousia pappei Baker, accepted as Codonorhiza falcata (L.f.) Goldblatt & J.C.Manning
- Lapeirousia pentheri Baker, accepted as Lapeirousia anceps (L.f.) Ker Gawl.
- Lapeirousia plicata (Jacq.) Diels, indigenous
  - Lapeirousia plicata (Jacq.) Diels subsp. effurcata (G.J.Lewis) Goldblatt, endemic
  - Lapeirousia plicata (Jacq.) Diels subsp. foliosa Goldblatt & J.C.Manning, indigenous
  - Lapeirousia plicata (Jacq.) Diels subsp. longifolia Goldblatt, accepted as Lapeirousia kalahariensis Goldblatt & J.C.Manning, indigenous
  - Lapeirousia plicata (Jacq.) Diels subsp. plicata, indigenous
- Lapeirousia pupurea Goldblatt & J.C.Manning, indigenous
- Lapeirousia purpureo-lutea (Klatt) Baker, accepted as Lapeirousia fastigiata (Lam.) Ker Gawl.
- Lapeirousia pyramidalis (Lam.) Goldblatt, indigenous
  - Lapeirousia pyramidalis (Lam.) Goldblatt subsp. pyramidalis, endemic
  - Lapeirousia pyramidalis (Lam.) Goldblatt subsp. regalis Goldblatt & J.C.Manning, endemic
- Lapeirousia rivularis Wanntorp, accepted as Afrosolen rivularis (Wanntorp) Goldblatt & J.C.Manning
- Lapeirousia sandersonii Baker, accepted as Afrosolen sandersonii (Baker) Goldblatt & J.C.Manning, indigenous
- Lapeirousia silenoides (Jacq.) Ker Gawl. endemic
- Lapeirousia simulans Goldblatt & J.C.Manning, endemic
- Lapeirousia speciosa Schltr. accepted as Lapeirousia silenoides (Jacq.) Ker Gawl.
- Lapeirousia spinosa (Goldblatt) Goldblatt & J.C.Manning, endemic
- Lapeirousia tenuis (Goldblatt) Goldblatt & J.C.Manning, endemic
- Lapeirousia verecunda Goldblatt, endemic
- Lapeirousia violacea Goldblatt, endemic

== Melasphaerula ==
Genus Melasphaerula:

- Melasphaerula ramosa (L.) Klatt, accepted as Ixia scillaris L. subsp. scillaris, indigenous
  - Melasphaerula ramosa (L.) N.E.Br., accepted as Melasphaerula graminea (L.f.) Ker Gawl. indigenous

== Meristostigma ==
Genus Meristostigma:

- Meristostigma aculeatum (Sweet) A.Dietr. accepted as Lapeirousia fabricii (D.Delaroche) Ker Gawl.
- Meristostigma corymbosum (L.) A.Dietr. accepted as Codonorhiza corymbosa (L.) Goldblatt & J.C.Manning
- Meristostigma falcatum (L.f.) A.Dietr. accepted as Codonorhiza falcata (L.f.) Goldblatt & J.C.Manning
- Meristostigma heterophyllum (Willd.) A.Dietr. accepted as Lapeirousia plicata (Jacq.) Diels subsp. plicata
- Meristostigma junceum (Ker Gawl.) Steud. accepted as Freesia verrucosa (B.Vogel) Goldblatt & J.C.Manning
- Meristostigma laxum (Thunb.) A.Dietr. accepted as Freesia laxa (Thunb.) Goldblatt & J.C.Manning subsp. laxa
- Meristostigma manuleaeflora (Eckl.) Steud. accepted as Codonorhiza micrantha (E.Mey. ex Klatt) Goldblatt & J.C.Manning
- Meristostigma silenoides (Jacq.) A.Dietr. accepted as Lapeirousia silenoides (Jacq.) Ker Gawl.

== Micranthus ==
Genus Micranthus:

- Micranthus alopecuroides (L.) Rothm. endemic
- Micranthus cruciatus Goldblatt & J.C.Manning, endemic
- Micranthus filifolius Goldblatt & J.C.Manning, endemic
- Micranthus junceus (Baker) N.E.Br. endemic
- Micranthus simplex Goldblatt & J.C.Manning, endemic
- Micranthus thereianthoides Goldblatt & J.C.Manning, endemic
- Micranthus tubulosus (Burm.f.) N.E.Br. endemic

== Montbretia ==
Genus Montbretia:

- Montbretia capensis (Houtt.) Voigt, accepted as Ixia paniculata D.Delaroche, indigenous
- Montbretia concolor (Sweet) Voigt, accepted as Ixia paniculata D.Delaroche, indigenous
- Montbretia lineata (Salisb.) Baker, accepted as Tritonia gladiolaris (Lam.) Goldblatt & J.C.Manning, indigenous
- Montbretia refracta (Jacq.) Endl. ex Heynh. accepted as Freesia refracta (Jacq.) Klatt
- Montbretia rocheana (Ker Gawl.) Heynh. accepted as Ixia bellendenii R.C.Foster, indigenous
- Montbretia tenuiflora (Vahl) Voigt, accepted as Ixia paniculata D.Delaroche, indigenous
- Montbretia viridis (Aiton) Voigt, accepted as Freesia viridis (Aiton) Goldblatt & J.C.Manning subsp. viridis
- Montbretia xanthospila (DC.) Heynh. accepted as Freesia caryophyllacea (Burm.f.) N.E.Br.

== Moraea ==
Genus Moraea:

- Moraea acocksii Goldblatt & J.C.Manning, indigenous
- Moraea albicuspa Goldblatt, indigenous
- Moraea albiflora (G.J.Lewis) Goldblatt, endemic
- Moraea algoensis Goldblatt, endemic
- Moraea alpina Goldblatt, indigenous
- Moraea alticola Goldblatt, indigenous
- Moraea amabilis Diels, indigenous
- Moraea amissa Goldblatt, endemic
- Moraea angulata Goldblatt, endemic
- Moraea angusta (Thunb.) Ker Gawl. endemic
- Moraea anomala G.J.Lewis, endemic
- Moraea apetala L.Bolus, accepted as Moraea cooperi Baker
- Moraea ardesiaca Goldblatt, endemic
- Moraea arenaria Baker, accepted as Moraea serpentina Baker
- Moraea aristata (D.Delaroche) Asch. & Graebn. endemic
- Moraea aspera Goldblatt, endemic
- Moraea atropunctata Goldblatt, endemic
- Moraea australis (Goldblatt) Goldblatt, endemic
- Moraea autumnalis (Goldblatt) Goldblatt, endemic
- Moraea balenii Stent, accepted as Moraea spathulata (L.f.) Klatt
- Moraea barbigera Salisb. accepted as Moraea tricolor Andrews
- Moraea barkerae Goldblatt, endemic
- Moraea barnardiella Goldblatt, endemic
- Moraea barnardii L.Bolus, endemic
- Moraea baurii Baker, accepted as Moraea huttonii (Baker) Oberm.
- Moraea bellendenii (Sweet) N.E.Br. endemic
  - Moraea bellendenii (Sweet) N.E.Br. subsp. cormifera Goldblatt, accepted as Moraea tricuspidata (L.f.) G.J.Lewis subsp. cormifera (Goldblatt) Goldblatt & J.C.Manning, indigenous
- Moraea bifida (L.Bolus) Goldblatt, endemic
- Moraea bipartita L.Bolus, endemic
- Moraea bituminosa (L.f.) Ker Gawl. endemic
- Moraea bolusii Baker, endemic
- Moraea brachygyne (Schltr.) Goldblatt, endemic
- Moraea brevistyla (Goldblatt) Goldblatt, indigenous
- Moraea brevituba (Goldblatt) Goldblatt, indigenous
- Moraea britteniae (L.Bolus) Goldblatt, endemic
- Moraea bubalina Goldblatt, endemic
- Moraea bulbifera Jacq. accepted as Moraea ramosissima (L.f.) Druce
- Moraea bulbillifera (G.J.Lewis) Goldblatt, indigenous
  - Moraea bulbillifera (G.J.Lewis) Goldblatt subsp. anomala (Goldblatt) Goldblatt, endemic
  - Moraea bulbillifera (G.J.Lewis) Goldblatt subsp. bulbillifera, endemic
- Moraea caeca Barnard ex Goldblatt, endemic
- Moraea caerulea Thunb. accepted as Aristea bracteata Pers.
- Moraea calcicola Goldblatt, endemic
- Moraea candida Baker, accepted as Moraea aristata (D.Delaroche) Asch. & Graebn.
- Moraea cantharophila Goldblatt & J.C.Manning, endemic
- Moraea carnea Goldblatt, endemic
- Moraea cedarmontana (Goldblatt) Goldblatt, endemic
- Moraea cedarmonticola Goldblatt, endemic
- Moraea ceresiana G.J.Lewis, accepted as Moraea unguiculata Ker Gawl.
- Moraea ciliata (L.f.) Ker Gawl. endemic
  - Moraea ciliata (L.f.) Ker Gawl. subsp. ciliata, endemic
  - Moraea ciliata (L.f.) Ker Gawl. subsp. cuprina Goldblatt & J.C.Manning, endemic
  - Moraea ciliata (L.f.) Ker Gawl. subsp. lutescens Goldblatt & J.C.Manning, endemic
  - Moraea ciliata (L.f.) Ker Gawl. var. barbigera (Salisb.) Baker, accepted as Moraea tricolor Andrews
  - Moraea ciliata (L.f.) Ker Gawl. var. gracilis Baker, accepted as Moraea gracilenta Goldblatt
  - Moraea ciliata (L.f.) Ker Gawl. var. tricolor (Andrews) Baker, accepted as Moraea tricolor Andrews
- Moraea citrina (G.J.Lewis) Goldblatt, endemic
- Moraea collina Thunb. endemic
- Moraea comptonii (L.Bolus) Goldblatt, endemic
- Moraea confusa G.J.Lewis, accepted as Moraea tricuspidata (L.f.) G.J.Lewis
- Moraea contorta Goldblatt, endemic
- Moraea cookii (L.Bolus) Goldblatt, indigenous
- Moraea cooperi Baker, endemic
- Moraea corniculata Lam. accepted as Moraea fugax (D.Delaroche) Jacq.
- Moraea crispa (L.f.) Ker Gawl. accepted as Moraea gawleri Spreng.
  - Moraea crispa (L.f.) Ker Gawl. var. rectifolia Baker, accepted as Moraea gawleri Spreng.
- Moraea crispa Thunb. indigenous
- Moraea culmea Killick, accepted as Moraea trifida R.C.Foster
- Moraea cuspidata Goldblatt & J.C.Manning, indigenous
- Moraea debilis Goldblatt, endemic
- Moraea decipiens Goldblatt & J.C.Manning, indigenous
- Moraea decussata Klatt, accepted as Moraea gawleri Spreng.
- Moraea deltoidea Goldblatt & J.C.Manning, endemic
- Moraea demissa Goldblatt, endemic
- Moraea deserticola Goldblatt, endemic
- Moraea diphylla Baker, accepted as Moraea filicaulis Baker
- Moraea doleritica Goldblatt & J.C.Manning, endemic
- Moraea dracomontana Goldblatt, indigenous
- Moraea duthieana L.Bolus, accepted as Moraea tricolor Andrews
- Moraea eburnea Goldblatt & J.C.Manning, endemic
- Moraea edulis (L.f.) Ker Gawl. [1], accepted as Moraea fugax (D.Delaroche) Jacq.
  - Moraea edulis L.f. var. gracilis Baker, accepted as Moraea gracilenta Goldblatt
- Moraea elegans Jacq. endemic
- Moraea elliotii Baker, indigenous
- Moraea elsiae Goldblatt, endemic
- Moraea exiliflora Goldblatt, endemic
- Moraea exilis N.E.Br. accepted as Moraea marionae N.E.Br.
- Moraea falcifolia Klatt, indigenous
- Moraea fasciculata Klatt, accepted as Moraea falcifolia Klatt
- Moraea fenestralis (Goldblatt & E.G.H.Oliv.) Goldblatt, endemic
- Moraea fenestrata (Goldblatt) Goldblatt, endemic
- Moraea fergusoniae L.Bolus, endemic
- Moraea ferrariola Jacq. accepted as Ferraria ferrariola (Jacq.) Willd.
- Moraea filamentosa Goldblatt & J.C.Manning, endemic
- Moraea filicaulis Baker, endemic
- Moraea fimbriata Klatt, accepted as Moraea fergusoniae L.Bolus
- Moraea fistulosa (Goldblatt) Goldblatt, endemic
- Moraea flaccida (Sweet) Steud. endemic
- Moraea flava Goldblatt & J.C.Manning, endemic
- Moraea flavescens (Goldblatt) Goldblatt, endemic
- Moraea flexicaulis Goldblatt, endemic
- Moraea flexuosa Goldblatt, accepted as Moraea flexicaulis Goldblatt
- Moraea fragrans Goldblatt, endemic
- Moraea framesii L.Bolus, accepted as Moraea serpentina Baker
- Moraea fugacissima (L.f.) Goldblatt, endemic
- Moraea fugax (D.Delaroche) Jacq. endemic
  - Moraea fugax (D.Delaroche) Jacq. subsp. filicaulis (Baker) Goldblatt, accepted as Moraea filicaulis Baker, endemic
  - Moraea fugax (D.Delaroche) Jacq. subsp. fugax, accepted as Moraea fugax (D.Delaroche) Jacq. endemic
- Moraea fusca Baker, accepted as Moraea lurida Ker Gawl.
- Moraea fuscomontana (Goldblatt) Goldblatt, endemic
- Moraea galaxia (L.f.) Goldblatt & J.C.Manning, endemic
- Moraea galaxioides Baker, accepted as Moraea falcifolia Klatt
- Moraea galpinii (Baker) N.E.Br. indigenous
  - Moraea galpinii (Baker) N.E.Br. subsp. robusta Goldblatt, accepted as Moraea robusta (Goldblatt) Goldblatt
- Moraea gawleri Spreng. endemic
- Moraea geminifolia Goldblatt & J.C.Manning, indigenous
- Moraea gigandra L.Bolus, endemic
- Moraea glaucopis (DC.) Drapiez, accepted as Moraea aristata (D.Delaroche) Asch. & Graebn.
- Moraea glutinosa Baker, accepted as Ferraria glutinosa (Baker) Rendle
- Moraea gracilenta Goldblatt, endemic
- Moraea graminicola Oberm. indigenous
  - Moraea graminicola Oberm. subsp. graminicola, endemic
  - Moraea graminicola Oberm. subsp. notata Goldblatt, endemic
- Moraea grandis Goldblatt & J.C.Manning, endemic
- Moraea hainebachiana Goldblatt & J.C.Manning, indigenous
- Moraea hantamensis Klatt, accepted as Moraea ciliata (L.f.) Ker Gawl.
- Moraea helicoidea Goldblatt & J.C.Manning, endemic
- Moraea helmei Goldblatt & J.C.Manning, indigenous
- Moraea herrei (L.Bolus) Goldblatt, endemic
- Moraea hesperantha (Goldblatt) Goldblatt, endemic
- Moraea hiemalis Goldblatt, endemic
- Moraea hirsuta (Licht. ex Roem. & Schult.) Ker Gawl. accepted as Moraea papilionacea (L.f.) Ker Gawl.
- Moraea huttonii (Baker) Oberm. indigenous
- Moraea inclinata Goldblatt, indigenous
- Moraea inconspicua Goldblatt, endemic
  - Moraea inconspicua Goldblatt subsp. inconspicua, endemic
  - Moraea inconspicua Goldblatt subsp. namaquensis Goldblatt & J.C.Manning, endemic
- Moraea incurva G.J.Lewis, endemic
- Moraea indecora Goldblatt, endemic
- Moraea insolens Goldblatt, endemic
- Moraea intermedia Goldblatt & J.C.Manning, indigenous
- Moraea iridioides L. accepted as Dietes iridioides (L.) Sweet ex Klatt
- Moraea iriopetala L.f. accepted as Moraea vegeta L.
- Moraea jarmilae Halda, accepted as Moraea albicuspa Goldblatt
- Moraea juncifolia N.E.Br. accepted as Moraea elliotii Baker
- Moraea kamiesensis Goldblatt, endemic
- Moraea kamiesmontana (Goldblatt) Goldblatt, endemic
- Moraea karroica Goldblatt, endemic
- Moraea knersvlaktensis Goldblatt, endemic
- Moraea lazulina Goldblatt & J.C.Manning, endemic
- Moraea lewisiae (Goldblatt) Goldblatt, indigenous
  - Moraea lewisiae (Goldblatt) Goldblatt subsp. lewisiae, endemic
  - Moraea lewisiae (Goldblatt) Goldblatt subsp. secunda (Goldblatt) Goldblatt, endemic
- Moraea lilacina Goldblatt & J.C.Manning, endemic
- Moraea linderi Goldblatt, endemic
- Moraea longiaristata Goldblatt, endemic
- Moraea longiflora Ker Gawl. endemic
- Moraea longifolia (Jacq.) Pers. endemic
- Moraea longifolia (Schneev.) Sweet, accepted as Moraea fugax (D.Delaroche) Jacq.
- Moraea longipes Goldblatt & J.C.Manning, endemic
- Moraea longispatha Klatt, accepted as Moraea spathulata (L.f.) Klatt
- Moraea longistyla (Goldblatt) Goldblatt, endemic
- Moraea loubseri Goldblatt, endemic
- Moraea louisabolusiae Goldblatt, endemic
- Moraea lugubris (Salisb.) Goldblatt, endemic
- Moraea lurida Ker Gawl. endemic
- Moraea luteoalba (Goldblatt) Goldblatt, endemic
- Moraea macgregorii Goldblatt, endemic
- Moraea macra Schltr. accepted as Moraea elliotii Baker
- Moraea macrocarpa Goldblatt, endemic
- Moraea macrochlamys Baker, accepted as Moraea ciliata (L.f.) Ker Gawl.
- Moraea macronyx G.J.Lewis, endemic
- Moraea margaretae Goldblatt, endemic
- Moraea marginata J.C.Manning & Goldblatt, endemic
- Moraea marionae N.E.Br. indigenous
- Moraea marlothii (L.Bolus) Goldblatt, endemic
- Moraea maximiliani (Schltr.) Goldblatt & J.C.Manning, endemic
- Moraea melanops Goldblatt & J.C.Manning, endemic
- Moraea miniata Andrews, endemic
- Moraea minima Goldblatt, endemic
- Moraea minor Eckl. endemic
- Moraea mira Klatt, accepted as Moraea lugubris (Salisb.) Goldblatt
- Moraea modesta Killick, indigenous
- Moraea moggii N.E.Br. indigenous
  - Moraea moggii N.E.Br. subsp. albescens Goldblatt, endemic
  - Moraea moggii N.E.Br. subsp. moggii, endemic
- Moraea monophylla Baker, accepted as Moraea mutila (C.H.Bergius ex Eckl.) Goldblatt & J.C.Manning
- Moraea montana Schltr. accepted as Moraea lurida Ker Gawl.
- Moraea monticola Goldblatt, endemic
- Moraea mossii N.E.Br. accepted as Moraea stricta Baker
- Moraea muddii N.E.Br. endemic
- Moraea mutila (C.H.Bergius ex Eckl.) Goldblatt & J.C.Manning, indigenous
- Moraea namaquamontana Goldblatt, endemic
- Moraea namaquana (Goldblatt) Goldblatt, endemic
- Moraea namibensis Goldblatt, indigenous
- Moraea nana (L.Bolus) Goldblatt & J.C.Manning, endemic
- Moraea natalensis Baker, indigenous
- Moraea neglecta G.J.Lewis, endemic
- Moraea neopavonia R.C.Foster, accepted as Moraea tulbaghensis L.Bolus
- Moraea nubigena Goldblatt, endemic
- Moraea obtusa N.E.Br. accepted as Moraea angusta (Thunb.) Ker Gawl.
- Moraea ochroleuca (Salisb.) Drapiez, endemic
- Moraea odora Salisb. accepted as Moraea fugax (D.Delaroche) Jacq.
- Moraea odorata G.J.Lewis, accepted as Moraea viscaria (L.f.) Ker Gawl.
- Moraea ogamana Goldblatt & J.C.Manning, indigenous
- Moraea orthrosantha Goldblatt & J.C.Manning, endemic
- Moraea ovalifolia Goldblatt, accepted as Moraea galaxia (L.f.) Goldblatt & J.C.Manning
- Moraea ovata Thunb. accepted as Ferraria ovata (Thunb.) Goldblatt & J.C.Manning
- Moraea pallida (Baker) Goldblatt, indigenous
- Moraea papilionacea (L.f.) Ker Gawl. endemic
  - Moraea papilionacea (L.f.) Ker Gawl. subsp. glabrescens Goldblatt & J.C.Manning, endemic
  - Moraea papilionacea (L.f.) Ker Gawl. subsp. papilionacea, endemic
  - Moraea papilionacea (L.f.) Ker Gawl. var. maythamiae G.J.Lewis, accepted as Moraea papilionacea (L.f.) Ker Gawl.
- Moraea parva N.E.Br. accepted as Moraea stricta Baker
- Moraea parviflora N.E.Br. accepted as Moraea natalensis Baker
- Moraea patens (Goldblatt) Goldblatt, endemic
- Moraea pavonia (L.f.) Ker Gawl. accepted as Moraea flexicaulis Goldblatt
  - Moraea pavonia (L.f.) Ker Gawl. var. lutea (Ker Gawl.) Baker, accepted as Moraea bellendenii (Sweet) N.E.Br.
  - Moraea pavonia (L.f.) Ker Gawl. var. villosa (Ker Gawl.) Baker, accepted as Moraea villosa (Ker Gawl.) Ker Gawl. subsp. villosa
- Moraea pearsonii Goldblatt & J.C.Manning, endemic
- Moraea pendula (Goldblatt) Goldblatt, endemic
- Moraea petricola Goldblatt & J.C.Manning, endemic
- Moraea pilifolia Goldblatt, endemic
- Moraea pilosa J.C.Wendl. accepted as Moraea papilionacea (L.f.) Ker Gawl.
- Moraea plumaria (Thunb.) Ker Gawl. accepted as Moraea lugubris (Salisb.) Goldblatt
- Moraea polyanthos L.f. endemic
- Moraea polystachya (Thunb.) Ker Gawl. indigenous
  - Moraea polystachya (Thunb.) Ker Gawl. var. brevicaulis Stent, accepted as Moraea venenata Dinter
- Moraea pritzeliana Diels, endemic
- Moraea pseudospicata Goldblatt, endemic
- Moraea pubiflora N.E.Br. indigenous
- Moraea pubiflora N.E.Br. subsp. brevistyla Goldblatt, accepted as Moraea brevistyla (Goldblatt) Goldblatt
- Moraea punctata Baker, accepted as Moraea mutila (C.H.Bergius ex Eckl.) Goldblatt & J.C.Manning, indigenous
- Moraea pyrophila Goldblatt, endemic
- Moraea quartzicola Goldblatt & J.C.Manning, indigenous
- Moraea radians (Goldblatt) Goldblatt, endemic
- Moraea ramosa (Thunb.) Ker Gawl. accepted as Moraea ramosissima (L.f.) Druce
- Moraea ramosissima (L.f.) Druce, endemic
- Moraea reflexa Goldblatt, endemic
- Moraea regalis Goldblatt & J.C.Manning, endemic
- Moraea reticulata Goldblatt, endemic
- Moraea riparia (Goldblatt) Goldblatt, endemic
- Moraea rivularis Schltr. accepted as Moraea huttonii (Baker) Oberm.
- Moraea rivulicola Goldblatt & J.C.Manning, endemic
- Moraea robusta (Goldblatt) Goldblatt, endemic
- Moraea rogersii N.E.Br. accepted as Moraea trifida R.C.Foster
- Moraea saldanhensis Goldblatt & J.C.Manning, indigenous
- Moraea saxicola Goldblatt, endemic
- Moraea schlechteri (L.Bolus) Goldblatt, endemic
- Moraea serpentina Baker, endemic
- Moraea serratostyla (Goldblatt) Goldblatt, endemic
- Moraea setifolia (L.f.) Druce, endemic
- Moraea simplex Goldblatt & J.C.Manning, endemic
- Moraea simulans Baker, indigenous
- Moraea singularis Goldblatt & J.C.Manning, endemic
- Moraea sordescens Jacq. accepted as Moraea vegeta L.
- Moraea spathacea (Thunb.) Ker Gawl. accepted as Moraea spathulata (L.f.) Klatt
  - Moraea spathacea (Thunb.) Ker Gawl. var. galpinii Baker, accepted as Moraea galpinii (Baker) N.E.Br.
- Moraea spathulata (L.f.) Klatt, indigenous
  - Moraea spathulata (L.f.) Klatt subsp. autumnalis Goldblatt, accepted as Moraea spathulata (L.f.) Klatt
  - Moraea spathulata (L.f.) Klatt subsp. saxosa Goldblatt, accepted as Moraea spathulata (L.f.) Klatt
  - Moraea spathulata (L.f.) Klatt subsp. transvaalensis Goldblatt, accepted as Moraea spathulata (L.f.) Klatt
- Moraea speciosa (L.Bolus) Goldblatt, endemic
- Moraea stagnalis (Goldblatt) Goldblatt, endemic
- Moraea stenocarpa Schltr. accepted as Moraea cooperi Baker
- Moraea stewartae N.E.Br. accepted as Moraea elliotii Baker
- Moraea striata Goldblatt & J.C.Manning, endemic
- Moraea stricta Baker, indigenous
- Moraea sulphurea Baker, accepted as Moraea gawleri Spreng.
- Moraea tanquana Goldblatt & J.C.Manning, endemic
- Moraea tenuis Ker Gawl. accepted as Moraea unguiculata Ker Gawl.
- Moraea teretifolia Goldblatt & J.C.Manning, indigenous
- Moraea thomasiae Goldblatt, endemic
- Moraea thomsonii Baker, indigenous
- Moraea tortilis Goldblatt, endemic
- Moraea toxicaria Dinter, accepted as Moraea venenata Dinter
- Moraea tricolor Andrews, endemic
- Moraea tricuspidata (L.f.) G.J.Lewis, endemic
  - Moraea tricuspidata (L.f.) G.J.Lewis subsp. cormifera (Goldblatt) Goldblatt & J.C.Manning, endemic
  - Moraea tricuspidata (L.f.) G.J.Lewis subsp. parviflora Goldblatt & J.C.Manning, endemic
  - Moraea tricuspidata (L.f.) G.J.Lewis subsp. tricuspidata, endemic
- Moraea tricuspis (Thunb.) Ker Gawl. accepted as Moraea tricuspidata (L.f.) G.J.Lewis
  - Moraea tricuspis (Thunb.) Ker Gawl. var. lutea Ker Gawl. accepted as Moraea bellendenii (Sweet) N.E.Br.
  - Moraea tricuspis (Thunb.) Ker Gawl. var. ocellata D.Don, accepted as Moraea aristata (D.Delaroche) Asch. & Graebn.
- Moraea trifida R.C.Foster, indigenous
- Moraea tripetala (L.f.) Ker Gawl. endemic
  - Moraea tripetala (L.f.) Ker Gawl. subsp. jacquiniana (Schltr. ex G.J.Lewis) Goldblatt & J.C.Manning, indigenous
  - Moraea tripetala (L.f.) Ker Gawl. subsp. tripetala, indigenous
  - Moraea tripetala (L.f.) Ker Gawl. subsp. violacea Goldblatt & J.C.Manning, indigenous
  - Moraea tripetala (L.f.) Ker Gawl. var. jacquiniana Schltr. ex G.J.Lewis, accepted as Moraea tripetala (L.f.) Ker Gawl. subsp. jacquiniana (Schltr. ex G.J.Lewis) Goldblatt & J.C.Manning
- Moraea tristis (L.f.) Ker Gawl. accepted as Moraea vegeta L.
- Moraea trita N.E.Br. accepted as Moraea stricta Baker
- Moraea tulbaghensis L.Bolus, endemic
- Moraea umbellata Thunb. endemic
- Moraea undulata (L.) Thunb. accepted as Ferraria crispa Burm.
- Moraea undulata Ker Gawl. accepted as Moraea gawleri Spreng.
- Moraea unguicularis Lam. accepted as Tritoniopsis unguicularis (Lam.) G.J.Lewis
- Moraea unguiculata Ker Gawl. endemic
- Moraea unibracteata Goldblatt, endemic
- Moraea vallisavium Goldblatt, endemic
- Moraea vallisbelli (Goldblatt) Goldblatt, endemic
- Moraea variabilis (G.J.Lewis) Goldblatt, endemic
- Moraea vegeta L. endemic
- Moraea venenata Dinter, indigenous
- Moraea verecunda Goldblatt, endemic
- Moraea versicolor (Salisb. ex Klatt) Goldblatt, endemic
- Moraea vespertina Goldblatt & J.C.Manning, endemic
- Moraea vigilans Goldblatt & J.C.Manning, endemic
- Moraea villosa (Ker Gawl.) Ker Gawl. indigenous
  - Moraea villosa (Ker Gawl.) Ker Gawl. subsp. elandsmontana Goldblatt, endemic
  - Moraea villosa (Ker Gawl.) Ker Gawl. subsp. villosa, endemic
- Moraea violacea Baker, accepted as Moraea elliotii Baker
- Moraea violacea L.Bolus, accepted as Moraea unguiculata Ker Gawl.
- Moraea virgata Jacq. indigenous
  - Moraea virgata Jacq. subsp. karooica (Goldblatt) Goldblatt, endemic
  - Moraea virgata Jacq. subsp. virgata, endemic
- Moraea viscaria (L.f.) Ker Gawl. endemic
- Moraea viscaria (L.f.) Ker Gawl. var. bituminosa (L.f.) Baker, accepted as Moraea bituminosa (L.f.) Ker Gawl.
- Moraea vlokii Goldblatt, endemic
- Moraea vuvuzela Goldblatt & J.C.Manning, indigenous
- Moraea worcesterensis Goldblatt, endemic

== Morphixia ==
Genus Morphixia:

- Morphixia angustifolia (Andrews) Klatt, accepted as Ixia monadelpha D.Delaroche, indigenous
- Morphixia aulica (Aiton) Ker Gawl. accepted as Ixia latifolia D.Delaroche, indigenous
- Morphixia capillaris (L.f.) Ker Gawl. accepted as Ixia capillaris L.f. indigenous
  - Morphixia capillaris (L.f.) Ker Gawl. var. incarnata (Jacq.) Baker, accepted as Ixia latifolia D.Delaroche, indigenous
  - Morphixia capillaris (L.f.) Ker Gawl. var. lancea (Jacq.) Baker, accepted as Ixia marginifolia Salisb. ex G.J.Lewis, indigenous
- Morphixia columellaris (Ker Gawl.) Klatt, accepted as Ixia monadelpha D.Delaroche, indigenous
- Morphixia curta (Andrews) Klatt, accepted as Ixia curta Andrews, indigenous
- Morphixia grandiflora (Andrews) Klatt, accepted as Ixia monadelpha D.Delaroche, indigenous
- Morphixia incarnata (Andrews) Ker Gawl. accepted as Ixia latifolia D.Delaroche, indigenous
- Morphixia lancea (Jacq.) Klatt, accepted as Ixia marginifolia Salisb. ex G.J.Lewis, indigenous
- Morphixia latifolia (Andrews) Klatt, accepted as Ixia monadelpha D.Delaroche, indigenous
- Morphixia monadelpha (D.Delaroche) Klatt, accepted as Ixia monadelpha D.Delaroche, indigenous
- Morphixia odorata (Ker Gawl.) Baker, accepted as Ixia odorata Ker Gawl. indigenous
- Morphixia paniculata (D.Delaroche) Baker, accepted as Ixia paniculata D.Delaroche, indigenous
  - Morphixia paniculata (D.Delaroche) Baker var. rochensis (Ker Gawl.) Baker, accepted as Ixia bellendenii R.C.Foster, indigenous
  - Morphixia paniculata (D.Delaroche) Baker var. tenuiflora (Vahl) Baker, accepted as Ixia paniculata D.Delaroche, indigenous
- Morphixia purpurea (Andrews) Klatt, accepted as Ixia monadelpha D.Delaroche, indigenous
- Morphixia versicolor (Andrews) Klatt, accepted as Ixia monadelpha D.Delaroche, indigenous

== Nivenia ==
Genus Nivenia:

- Nivenia argentea Goldblatt, endemic
- Nivenia binata Klatt, endemic
- Nivenia capitata (Klatt) Weim. accepted as Nivenia argentea Goldblatt
- Nivenia concinna N.E.Br. endemic
- Nivenia corymbosa (Ker Gawl.) Baker, endemic
- Nivenia dispar N.E.Br. endemic
- Nivenia fruticosa (L.f.) Baker, endemic
- Nivenia inaequalis Goldblatt & J.C.Manning, endemic
- Nivenia levynsiae Weim. endemic
- Nivenia parviflora Goldblatt, endemic
- Nivenia stenosiphon Goldblatt, endemic
- Nivenia stokoei (L.Guthrie) N.E.Br. endemic

== Nymanina ==
Genus Nymanina:

- Nymanina leichtlinii (Klatt) Kuntze, accepted as Freesia leichtlinii Klatt subsp. leichtlinii
- Nymanina refracta (Jacq.) Kuntze, accepted as Freesia refracta (Jacq.) Klatt

== Ovieda ==
Genus Ovieda:

- Ovieda aculeata (Sweet) Klatt, accepted as Lapeirousia fabricii (D.Delaroche) Ker Gawl.
- Ovieda corymbosa (L.) Spreng. accepted as Codonorhiza corymbosa (L.) Goldblatt & J.C.Manning
- Ovieda falcata (L.f.) Spreng. accepted as Codonorhiza falcata (L.f.) Goldblatt & J.C.Manning
- Ovieda fasciculata (Ker Gawl.) Spreng. accepted as Lapeirousia plicata (Jacq.) Diels subsp. plicata
- Ovieda fistulosa Spreng. ex Klatt, accepted as Xenoscapa fistulosa (Spreng. ex Klatt) Goldblatt & J.C.Manning
- Ovieda micrantha E.Mey. ex Klatt, accepted as Codonorhiza micrantha (E.Mey. ex Klatt) Goldblatt & J.C.Manning
- Ovieda purpureo-lutea Klatt, accepted as Lapeirousia fastigiata (Lam.) Ker Gawl.
- Ovieda silenoides (Jacq.) Spreng. accepted as Lapeirousia silenoides (Jacq.) Ker Gawl.

== Peyrousia ==
Genus Peyrousia:

- Peyrousia falcata (L.f.) Sweet, accepted as Codonorhiza falcata (L.f.) Goldblatt & J.C.Manning
- Peyrousia fasciculata (Ker Gawl.) Sweet, accepted as Lapeirousia plicata (Jacq.) Diels subsp. plicata
- Peyrousia silenoides (Jacq.) Sweet, accepted as Lapeirousia silenoides (Jacq.) Ker Gawl.

== Pillansia ==
Genus Pillansia:

- Pillansia templemannii (Baker) L.Bolus, endemic

== Psilosiphon ==
Genus Psilosiphon:

- Psilosiphon bainesii (Baker) Goldblatt & J.C.Manning, accepted as Afrosolen bainesii (Baker) Goldblatt & J.C.Manning, indigenous
- Psilosiphon masukuensis (Vaupel & Schltr.) Goldblatt & J.C.Manning, accepted as Afrosolen masukuensis (Vaupel & Schltr.) Goldblatt & J.C.Manning, indigenous
- Psilosiphon sandersonii (Baker) Goldblatt & J.C.Manning, accepted as Afrosolen sandersonii (Baker) Goldblatt & J.C.Manning, indigenous
  - Psilosiphon sandersonii (Baker) Goldblatt & J.C.Manning subsp. limpopoensis Goldblatt & J.C.Manning, accepted as Afrosolen sandersonii (Baker) Goldblatt & J.C.Manning subsp. limpopoensis (Goldblatt & J.C.Manning), indigenous

== Radinosiphon ==
Genus Radinosiphon:

- Radinosiphon leptostachya (Baker) N.E.Br. indigenous
- Radinosiphon lomatensis (N.E.Br.) N.E.Br. endemic

== Rheome ==
Genus Rheome:

- Rheome maximiliani (Schltr.) Goldblatt, accepted as Moraea maximiliani (Schltr.) Goldblatt & J.C.Manning
- Rheome umbellata (Thunb.) Goldblatt, accepted as Moraea umbellata Thunb.

== Roggeveldia ==
Genus Roggeveldia:

- Roggeveldia fistulosa Goldblatt, accepted as Moraea fistulosa (Goldblatt) Goldblatt
- Roggeveldia montana Goldblatt, accepted as Moraea monticola Goldblatt

== Romulea ==
Genus Romulea:

- Romulea albiflora J.C.Manning & Goldblatt, endemic
- Romulea albomarginata M.P.de Vos, endemic
- Romulea alticola J.C.Manning & Goldblatt, indigenous
- Romulea amoena Schltr. ex Beg. accepted as Romulea pudica (Sol. ex Ker Gawl.) Baker, endemic
- Romulea aquatica G.J.Lewis, endemic
- Romulea atrandra G.J.Lewis, indigenous
  - Romulea atrandra G.J.Lewis var. atrandra, endemic
  - Romulea atrandra G.J.Lewis var. esterhuyseniae M.P.de Vos, endemic
  - Romulea atrandra G.J.Lewis var. lewisiae M.P.de Vos, endemic
- Romulea austinii E.Phillips, endemic
- Romulea autumnalis L.Bolus, endemic
- Romulea barkerae M.P.de Vos, endemic
- Romulea biflora (Beg.) M.P.de Vos, endemic
- Romulea camerooniana Baker, indigenous
- Romulea campanuloides Harms var. campanuloides, accepted as Romulea camerooniana Baker
  - Romulea campanuloides Harms var. gigantea M.P.de Vos, accepted as Romulea camerooniana Baker
- Romulea cedarbergensis M.P.de Vos, endemic
- Romulea citrina Baker, endemic
- Romulea collina J.C.Manning & Goldblatt, endemic
- Romulea cruciata (Jacq.) Baker, indigenous
  - Romulea cruciata (Jacq.) Baker var. cruciata, endemic
  - Romulea cruciata (Jacq.) Baker var. intermedia (Beg.) M.P.de Vos, endemic
- Romulea dichotoma (Thunb.) Baker, endemic
- Romulea discifera J.C.Manning & Goldblatt, endemic
- Romulea diversiformis M.P.de Vos, endemic
- Romulea eburnea J.C.Manning & Goldblatt, endemic
- Romulea elliptica M.P.de Vos, endemic
- Romulea eximia M.P.de Vos, endemic
- Romulea fibrosa M.P.de Vos, endemic
- Romulea flava (Lam.) M.P.de Vos, indigenous
  - Romulea flava (Lam.) M.P.de Vos var. flava, endemic
  - Romulea flava (Lam.) M.P.de Vos var. hirsuta (Beg.) M.P.de Vos, endemic
  - Romulea flava (Lam.) M.P.de Vos var. minor (Beg.) M.P.de Vos, endemic
  - Romulea flava (Lam.) M.P.de Vos var. viridiflora (Beg.) M.P.de Vos, endemic
- Romulea flexuosa Klatt, endemic
- Romulea gigantea Beg. endemic
- Romulea gracillima Baker, endemic
- Romulea hallii M.P.de Vos, endemic
- Romulea hantamensis (Diels) Goldblatt, endemic
- Romulea hirsuta (Steud. ex Klatt) Baker, indigenous
  - Romulea hirsuta (Steud. ex Klatt) Baker var. cuprea (Beg.) M.P.de Vos, endemic
  - Romulea hirsuta (Steud. ex Klatt) Baker var. framesii (L.Bolus) M.P.de Vos, endemic
  - Romulea hirsuta (Steud. ex Klatt) Baker var. hirsuta, endemic
  - Romulea hirsuta (Steud. ex Klatt) Baker var. zeyheri (Baker) M.P.de Vos, endemic
- Romulea hirta Schltr. endemic
- Romulea jugicola M.P.de Vos, endemic
- Romulea kamisensis M.P.de Vos, endemic
- Romulea komsbergensis M.P.de Vos, endemic
- Romulea leipoldtii Marais, endemic
- Romulea lilacina J.C.Manning & Goldblatt, endemic
- Romulea longipes Schltr. endemic
- Romulea lutea J.C.Manning & Goldblatt, endemic
- Romulea luteoflora (M.P.de Vos) M.P.de Vos, indigenous
  - Romulea luteoflora (M.P.de Vos) M.P.de Vos var. luteoflora, endemic
- Romulea macowanii Baker, indigenous
- Romulea macowanii Baker var. alticola (B.L.Burtt) M.P.de Vos, indigenous
- Romulea macowanii Baker var. macowanii, indigenous
- Romulea macowanii Baker var. oreophila M.P.de Vos, indigenous
- Romulea maculata J.C.Manning & Goldblatt, endemic
- Romulea malaniae M.P.de Vos, endemic
- Romulea membranacea M.P.de Vos, endemic
- Romulea minutiflora Klatt, endemic
- Romulea monadelpha (Sweet) Baker, endemic
- Romulea monophylla J.C.Manning & Goldblatt, indigenous
- Romulea montana Schltr. ex Beg. endemic
- Romulea monticola M.P.de Vos, endemic
- Romulea multifida M.P.de Vos, endemic
- Romulea multisulcata M.P.de Vos, endemic
- Romulea namaquensis M.P.de Vos, endemic
- Romulea neglecta (Schult.) M.P.de Vos, accepted as Romulea speciosa (Ker Gawl.) Baker, endemic
- Romulea obscura Klatt, indigenous
  - Romulea obscura Klatt var. blanda M.P.de Vos, endemic
  - Romulea obscura Klatt var. campestris M.P.de Vos, endemic
  - Romulea obscura Klatt var. obscura, endemic
  - Romulea obscura Klatt var. subtestacea M.P.de Vos, endemic
- Romulea papyracea Wolley-Dod, accepted as Romulea schlechteri Beg.
- Romulea pearsonii M.P.de Vos, endemic
- Romulea pilosa J.C.Manning & Goldblatt, indigenous
- Romulea pratensis M.P.de Vos, endemic
- Romulea pudica (Sol. ex Ker Gawl.) Baker, endemic
- Romulea quartzicola J.C.Manning & Goldblatt, indigenous
- Romulea rosea (L.) Eckl. indigenous
  - Romulea rosea (L.) Eckl. var. australis (Ewart) M.P.de Vos, endemic
  - Romulea rosea (L.) Eckl. var. communis M.P.de Vos, endemic
  - Romulea rosea (L.) Eckl. var. elegans (Klatt) Beg. endemic
  - Romulea rosea (L.) Eckl. var. reflexa (Eckl.) Beg. accepted as Romulea flava (Lam.) M.P.de Vos var. flava, endemic
  - Romulea rosea (L.) Eckl. var. rosea, endemic
- Romulea rupestris J.C.Manning & Goldblatt, endemic
- Romulea sabulosa Schltr. ex Beg. endemic
- Romulea saldanhensis M.P.de Vos, endemic
- Romulea sanguinalis M.P.de Vos, endemic
- Romulea saxatilis M.P.de Vos, endemic
- Romulea schlechteri Beg. endemic
- Romulea setifolia N.E.Br. indigenous
  - Romulea setifolia N.E.Br. var. aggregata M.P.de Vos, endemic
  - Romulea setifolia N.E.Br. var. belviderica M.P.de Vos, endemic
  - Romulea setifolia N.E.Br. var. ceresiana M.P.de Vos, endemic
  - Romulea setifolia N.E.Br. var. setifolia, endemic
- Romulea singularis J.C.Manning & Goldblatt, endemic
- Romulea sinispinosensis M.P.de Vos, endemic
- Romulea sladenii M.P.de Vos, endemic
- Romulea speciosa (Ker Gawl.) Baker, indigenous
- Romulea sphaerocarpa M.P.de Vos, endemic
- Romulea stellata M.P.de Vos, endemic
- Romulea subfistulosa M.P.de Vos, endemic
- Romulea sulphurea Beg. endemic
- Romulea syringodeoflora M.P.de Vos, endemic
- Romulea tabularis Eckl. ex Beg. endemic
- Romulea tetragona M.P.de Vos, indigenous
  - Romulea tetragona M.P.de Vos var. flavandra M.P.de Vos, endemic
  - Romulea tetragona M.P.de Vos var. tetragona, endemic
- Romulea tortilis Baker, indigenous
  - Romulea tortilis Baker var. dissecta M.P.de Vos, endemic
  - Romulea tortilis Baker var. tortilis, endemic
- Romulea tortuosa (Licht. ex Roem. & Schult.) Baker, indigenous
  - Romulea tortuosa (Licht. ex Roem. & Schult.) Baker subsp. aurea (Klatt) M.P.de Vos, endemic
  - Romulea tortuosa (Licht. ex Roem. & Schult.) Baker subsp. depauperata M.P.de Vos, endemic
  - Romulea tortuosa (Licht. ex Roem. & Schult.) Baker subsp. tortuosa, endemic
- Romulea toximontana M.P.de Vos, endemic
- Romulea triflora (Burm.f.) N.E.Br. endemic
- Romulea tubulosa J.C.Manning & Goldblatt, indigenous
- Romulea unifolia M.P.de Vos, endemic
- Romulea vanzyliae M.P.de Vos, accepted as Romulea subfistulosa M.P.de Vos
- Romulea vinacea M.P.de Vos, endemic
- Romulea viridibracteata M.P.de Vos, endemic
- Romulea vlokii M.P.de Vos, endemic

== Schizorhiza ==
Genus Schizorhiza:

- Schizorhiza neglecta (Goldblatt) Goldblatt & J.C.Manning, indigenous

== Schizostylis ==
Genus Schizostylis:

- Schizostylis coccinea Backh. & Harv. accepted as Hesperantha coccinea (Backh. & Harv.) Goldblatt & J.C.Manning

== Sisyrinchium ==
Genus Sisyrinchium:

- Sisyrinchium angustifolium Mill. not indigenous, invasive
- Sisyrinchium micranthum Cav. not indigenous

== Sophronia ==
Genus Sophronia:

- Sophronia fasciculata Licht. ex Roem. & Schult. accepted as Lapeirousia plicata (Jacq.) Diels subsp. plicata

== Sparaxis ==
Genus Sparaxis:

- Sparaxis auriculata Goldblatt & J.C.Manning, endemic
- Sparaxis bulbifera (L.) Ker Gawl. endemic
- Sparaxis calcicola Goldblatt & J.C.Manning, endemic
- Sparaxis caryophyllacea Goldblatt, endemic
- Sparaxis elegans (Sweet) Goldblatt, endemic
- Sparaxis fragrans (Jacq.) Ker Gawl. endemic
- Sparaxis galeata Ker Gawl. endemic
- Sparaxis grandiflora (D.Delaroche) Ker Gawl. indigenous
  - Sparaxis grandiflora (D.Delaroche) Ker Gawl. subsp. acutiloba Goldblatt, endemic
  - Sparaxis grandiflora (D.Delaroche) Ker Gawl. subsp. fimbriata (Lam.) Goldblatt, endemic
  - Sparaxis grandiflora (D.Delaroche) Ker Gawl. subsp. grandiflora, endemic
  - Sparaxis grandiflora (D.Delaroche) Ker Gawl. subsp. violacea (Eckl.) Goldblatt, endemic
- Sparaxis maculosa Goldblatt, endemic
- Sparaxis metelerkampiae (L.Bolus) Goldblatt & J.C.Manning, endemic
- Sparaxis parviflora (G.J.Lewis) Goldblatt, endemic
- Sparaxis pillansii L.Bolus, endemic
- Sparaxis roxburghii (Baker) Goldblatt, endemic
- Sparaxis tricolor (Schneev.) Ker Gawl. endemic
- Sparaxis variegata (Sweet) Goldblatt, endemic
  - Sparaxis variegata (Sweet) Goldblatt subsp. metelerkampiae (L.Bolus) Goldblatt, accepted as Sparaxis metelerkampiae (L.Bolus) Goldblatt & J.C.Manning
- Sparaxis villosa (Burm.f.) Goldblatt, endemic

== Syringodea ==
Genus Syringodea:

- Syringodea bifucata M.P.de Vos, endemic
- Syringodea concolor (Baker) M.P.de Vos, endemic
- Syringodea derustensis M.P.de Vos, endemic
- Syringodea flanaganii Baker, endemic
- Syringodea longituba (Klatt) Kuntze var. longituba, accepted as Syringodea longituba (Klatt) Kuntze subsp. longituba, endemic
  - Syringodea longituba (Klatt) Kuntze var. violacea M.P.de Vos, accepted as Syringodea longituba (Klatt) Kuntze subsp. violacea (M.P.de Vos) Goldblatt & J.C.Manning, endemic
- Syringodea pulchella Hook.f. endemic
- Syringodea saxatilis M.P.de Vos, endemic
- Syringodea unifolia Goldblatt, accepted as Afrocrocus unifolius (Goldblatt) Goldblatt & J.C.Manning, endemic

== Thereianthus ==
Genus Thereianthus:

- Thereianthus bracteolatus (Lam.) G.J.Lewis, endemic
- Thereianthus bulbiferus Goldblatt & J.C.Manning, indigenous
- Thereianthus elandsmontanus Goldblatt & J.C.Manning, indigenous
- Thereianthus intermedius J.C.Manning & Goldblatt, indigenous
- Thereianthus ixioides G.J.Lewis, endemic
- Thereianthus juncifolius (Baker) G.J.Lewis, endemic
- Thereianthus longicollis (Schltr.) G.J.Lewis, endemic
- Thereianthus minutus (Klatt) G.J.Lewis, endemic
- Thereianthus montanus J.C.Manning & Goldblatt, endemic
- Thereianthus racemosus (Klatt) G.J.Lewis, endemic
- Thereianthus spicatus (L.) G.J.Lewis, endemic
  - Thereianthus spicatus (L.) G.J.Lewis var. linearifolius G.J.Lewis, accepted as Thereianthus spicatus (L.) G.J.Lewis

== Tritonia ==
Genus Tritonia:

- Tritonia atrorubens (N.E.Br.) L.Bolus, endemic
- Tritonia bakeri Klatt, indigenous
  - Tritonia bakeri Klatt subsp. bakeri, endemic
  - Tritonia bakeri Klatt subsp. lilacina (F.Bolus) M.P.de Vos, endemic
- Tritonia capensis (Houtt.) Ker Gawl. accepted as Ixia paniculata D.Delaroche, indigenous
- Tritonia cedarmontana Goldblatt & J.C.Manning, indigenous
- Tritonia chrysantha Fourc. endemic
- Tritonia concolor Sweet, accepted as Ixia paniculata D.Delaroche, indigenous
- Tritonia cooperi (Baker) Klatt, indigenous
  - Tritonia cooperi (Baker) Klatt subsp. cooperi, endemic
  - Tritonia cooperi (Baker) Klatt subsp. quadrialata M.P.de Vos, endemic
- Tritonia crispa (L.f.) Ker Gawl. var. crispa, accepted as Tritonia undulata (Burm.f.) Baker, endemic
  - Tritonia crispa (L.f.) Ker Gawl. var. parviflora Baker, accepted as Tritonia undulata (Burm.f.) Baker, endemic
- Tritonia crocata (L.) Ker Gawl. endemic
- Tritonia delpierrei M.P.de Vos, accepted as Tritonia marlothii M.P.de Vos subsp. delpierrei (M.P.de Vos) M.P.de Vos, endemic
- Tritonia deusta (Aiton) Ker Gawl. indigenous
  - Tritonia deusta (Aiton) Ker Gawl. subsp. deusta, endemic
  - Tritonia deusta (Aiton) Ker Gawl. subsp. miniata (Jacq.) M.P.de Vos, endemic
- Tritonia disticha (Klatt) Baker, indigenous
  - Tritonia disticha (Klatt) Baker subsp. disticha, endemic
  - Tritonia disticha (Klatt) Baker subsp. rubrolucens (R.C.Foster) M.P.de Vos, indigenous
- Tritonia drakensbergensis M.P.de Vos, endemic
- Tritonia dubia Eckl. ex Klatt, endemic
- Tritonia flabellifolia (D.Delaroche) G.J.Lewis, indigenous
  - Tritonia flabellifolia (D.Delaroche) G.J.Lewis var. flabellifolia, endemic
  - Tritonia flabellifolia (D.Delaroche) G.J.Lewis var. major (Ker Gawl.) M.P.de Vos, endemic
  - Tritonia flabellifolia (D.Delaroche) G.J.Lewis var. thomasiae M.P.de Vos, endemic
- Tritonia florentiae (Marloth) Goldblatt, endemic
- Tritonia gladiolaris (Lam.) Goldblatt & J.C.Manning, indigenous
- Tritonia kamisbergensis Klatt, endemic
- Tritonia karooica M.P.de Vos, endemic
- Tritonia lancea (Thunb.) N.E.Br. endemic
- Tritonia latifolia (D.Delaroche) N.E.Br. accepted as Ixia latifolia D.Delaroche, indigenous
- Tritonia laxifolia (Klatt) Benth. ex Baker, indigenous
- Tritonia linearifolia Goldblatt & J.C.Manning, endemic
- Tritonia lineata (Salisb.) Ker Gawl. accepted as Tritonia gladiolaris (Lam.) Goldblatt & J.C.Manning, indigenous
  - Tritonia lineata (Salisb.) Ker Gawl. var. parvifolia M.P.de Vos, accepted as Tritonia gladiolaris (Lam.) Goldblatt & J.C.Manning, endemic
- Tritonia longiflora (P.J.Bergius) Ker Gawl. accepted as Ixia paniculata D.Delaroche, indigenous
- Tritonia marlothii M.P.de Vos, endemic
  - Tritonia marlothii M.P.de Vos subsp. delpierrei (M.P.de Vos) M.P.de Vos, endemic
- Tritonia nelsonii Baker, indigenous
- Tritonia pallida Ker Gawl. indigenous
  - Tritonia pallida Ker Gawl. subsp. pallida, endemic
  - Tritonia pallida Ker Gawl. subsp. taylorae (L.Bolus) M.P.de Vos, endemic
- Tritonia paniculata (D.Delaroche) Klatt, accepted as Ixia paniculata D.Delaroche, indigenous
- Tritonia parvula N.E.Br. endemic
- Tritonia refracta (Jacq.) Ker Gawl. accepted as Freesia refracta (Jacq.) Klatt
- Tritonia rocheana Sweet, accepted as Ixia bellendenii R.C.Foster, indigenous
- Tritonia rochensis Ker Gawl. accepted as Ixia bellendenii R.C.Foster, indigenous
- Tritonia scillaris (L.) Baker, accepted as Ixia scillaris L. indigenous
  - Tritonia scillaris var. stricta (Eckl. ex Klatt) Baker, accepted as Ixia stricta (Eckl. ex Klatt) G.J.Lewis, indigenous
- Tritonia securigera (Aiton) Ker Gawl. accepted as Tritonia securigera (Aiton) Ker Gawl. subsp. securigera, endemic
  - Tritonia securigera (Aiton) Ker Gawl. subsp. securigera, endemic
  - Tritonia securigera (Aiton) Ker Gawl. subsp. watermeyeri (L.Bolus) J.C.Manning & Goldblatt, endemic
- Tritonia squalida (Aiton) Ker Gawl. endemic
- Tritonia strictifolia (Klatt) Benth. & Hook.f. ex B.D.Jacks. endemic
- Tritonia tenuiflora (Vahl) Ker Gawl. accepted as Ixia paniculata D.Delaroche, indigenous
- Tritonia thunbergii N.E.Br. accepted as Ixia erubescens Goldblatt, indigenous
- Tritonia trinervata Baker, accepted as Ixia trinervata (Baker) G.J.Lewis, indigenous
- Tritonia tugwelliae L.Bolus, endemic
- Tritonia undulata (Burm.f.) Baker, endemic
- Tritonia viridis (Aiton) Ker Gawl. accepted as Freesia viridis (Aiton) Goldblatt & J.C.Manning subsp. viridis
- Tritonia watermeyeri L.Bolus, accepted as Tritonia securigera (Aiton) Ker Gawl. subsp. watermeyeri (L.Bolus) J.C.Manning & Goldblatt, endemic
- Tritonia xanthospila (DC.) Ker Gawl. ex Spreng. accepted as Freesia caryophyllacea (Burm.f.) N.E.Br.

== Tritoniopsis ==
Genus Tritoniopsis:

- Tritoniopsis antholyza (Poir.) Goldblatt, endemic
- Tritoniopsis bicolor J.C.Manning & Goldblatt, endemic
- Tritoniopsis burchellii (N.E.Br.) Goldblatt, endemic
- Tritoniopsis afra (N.E.Br.) Goldblatt & J.C.Manning, endemic
- Tritoniopsis caledonensis (R.C.Foster) G.J.Lewis, endemic
- Tritoniopsis cinnamomea J.C.Manning & Goldblatt, endemic
- Tritoniopsis dodii (G.J.Lewis) G.J.Lewis, endemic
- Tritoniopsis elongata (L.Bolus) G.J.Lewis, endemic
- Tritoniopsis flava J.C.Manning & Goldblatt, endemic
- Tritoniopsis flexuosa (L.f.) G.J.Lewis, endemic
- Tritoniopsis intermedia (Baker) Goldblatt, endemic
- Tritoniopsis lata (L.Bolus) G.J.Lewis, indigenous
  - Tritoniopsis lata (L.Bolus) G.J.Lewis var. lata, endemic
  - Tritoniopsis lata (L.Bolus) G.J.Lewis var. longibracteata (L.Bolus) G.J.Lewis, endemic
- Tritoniopsis latifolia G.J.Lewis, endemic
- Tritoniopsis lesliei L.Bolus, endemic
- Tritoniopsis longituba (Fourc.) Goldblatt, accepted as Tritoniopsis antholyza (Poir.) Goldblatt
- Tritoniopsis nemorosa (E.Mey. ex Klatt) G.J.Lewis, endemic
- Tritoniopsis nervosa (Baker) G.J.Lewis, endemic
- Tritoniopsis parviflora (Jacq.) G.J.Lewis, indigenous
  - Tritoniopsis parviflora (Jacq.) G.J.Lewis var. angusta (L.Bolus) G.J.Lewis, endemic
  - Tritoniopsis parviflora (Jacq.) G.J.Lewis var. parviflora, endemic
- Tritoniopsis pulchella G.J.Lewis, indigenous
  - Tritoniopsis pulchella G.J.Lewis var. alpina G.J.Lewis, endemic
  - Tritoniopsis pulchella G.J.Lewis var. pulchella, endemic
- Tritoniopsis pulchra (Baker) Goldblatt, endemic
- Tritoniopsis ramosa (Eckl. ex Klatt) G.J.Lewis, indigenous
  - Tritoniopsis ramosa (Eckl. ex Klatt) G.J.Lewis var. ramosa, endemic
  - Tritoniopsis ramosa (Eckl. ex Klatt) G.J.Lewis var. robusta G.J.Lewis, endemic
  - Tritoniopsis ramosa (Eckl. ex Klatt) G.J.Lewis var. unguiculata (Baker) G.J.Lewis, endemic
- Tritoniopsis revoluta (Burm.f.) Goldblatt, endemic
- Tritoniopsis toximontana J.C.Manning & Goldblatt, endemic
- Tritoniopsis triticea (Burm.f.) Goldblatt, endemic
- Tritoniopsis unguicularis (Lam.) G.J.Lewis, endemic
- Tritoniopsis williamsiana Goldblatt, endemic

== Tritonixia ==
Genus Tritonixia:

- Tritonixia conferta Klatt, accepted as Ixia stohriae L.Bolus, indigenous
- Tritonixia lineata (Salisb.) Klatt, accepted as Tritonia gladiolaris (Lam.) Goldblatt & J.C.Manning, indigenous
- Tritonixia scillaris (L.) Klatt, accepted as Ixia scillaris L. indigenous
- Tritonixia stricta Eckl. ex Klatt, accepted as Ixia stricta (Eckl. ex Klatt) G.J.Lewis, indigenous

== Waitzia ==
Genus Waitzia:

- Waitzia capensis (Houtt.) Rchb. accepted as Ixia paniculata D.Delaroche, indigenous
- Waitzia concolor (Sweet) Heynh. accepted as Ixia paniculata D.Delaroche, indigenous
- Waitzia odorata (Lodd.) Heynh. accepted as Freesia corymbosa (Burm.f.) N.E.Br.
- Waitzia rochensis (Ker Gawl.) Heynh. accepted as Ixia bellendenii R.C.Foster, indigenous
- Waitzia tenuiflora (Vahl) Heynh. accepted as Ixia paniculata D.Delaroche, indigenous
- Waitzia viridis (Aiton) Kresig, accepted as Freesia viridis (Aiton) Goldblatt & J.C.Manning subsp. viridis

== Watsonia ==
Genus Watsonia:

- Watsonia aletroides (Burm.f.) Ker Gawl. endemic
- Watsonia amabilis Goldblatt, endemic
- Watsonia amatolae Goldblatt, endemic
- Watsonia angusta Ker Gawl. endemic
- Watsonia bachmannii L.Bolus, endemic
- Watsonia bella N.E.Br. ex Goldblatt, indigenous
- Watsonia borbonica (Pourr.) Goldblatt, indigenous
  - Watsonia borbonica (Pourr.) Goldblatt subsp. ardernei (Sander) Goldblatt, endemic
  - Watsonia borbonica (Pourr.) Goldblatt subsp. borbonica, endemic
- Watsonia campanulata Klatt, accepted as Ixia polystachya L. indigenous
- Watsonia canaliculata Goldblatt, endemic
- Watsonia coccinea Herb. ex Baker, endemic
- Watsonia confusa Goldblatt, endemic
- Watsonia densiflora Baker, endemic
- Watsonia distans L.Bolus, endemic
- Watsonia dubia Eckl. ex Klatt, endemic
- Watsonia elsiae Goldblatt, endemic
- Watsonia emiliae L.Bolus, endemic
- Watsonia fergusoniae L.Bolus, endemic
- Watsonia fourcadei J.W.Mathews & L.Bolus, endemic
- Watsonia galpinii L.Bolus, endemic
- Watsonia gladioloides Schltr. indigenous
- Watsonia humilis Mill. endemic
- Watsonia hysterantha J.W.Mathews & L.Bolus, endemic
- Watsonia inclinata Goldblatt, endemic
- Watsonia knysnana L.Bolus, endemic
- Watsonia laccata (Jacq.) Ker Gawl. endemic
- Watsonia latifolia N.E.Br. ex Oberm. indigenous
- Watsonia lepida N.E.Br. indigenous
- Watsonia marginata (L.f.) Ker Gawl. endemic
- Watsonia marlothii L.Bolus, endemic
- Watsonia meriana (L.) Mill. indigenous
  - Watsonia meriana (L.) Mill. var. bulbillifera (J.W.Mathews & L.Bolus) D.A.Cooke, endemic
  - Watsonia meriana (L.) Mill. var. meriana, endemic
- Watsonia minima Goldblatt, endemic
- Watsonia mtamvunae Goldblatt, endemic
- Watsonia occulta L.Bolus, indigenous
- Watsonia paucifolia Goldblatt, endemic
- Watsonia pillansii L.Bolus, endemic
- Watsonia pondoensis Goldblatt, endemic
- Watsonia pulchra N.E.Br. ex Goldblatt, indigenous
- Watsonia rogersii L.Bolus, endemic
- Watsonia rourkei Goldblatt, endemic
- Watsonia schlechteri L.Bolus, endemic
- Watsonia spectabilis Schinz, endemic
- Watsonia stenosiphon L.Bolus, endemic
- Watsonia stokoei L.Bolus, endemic
- Watsonia strictiflora Ker Gawl. endemic
- Watsonia strubeniae L.Bolus, endemic
- Watsonia tabularis J.W.Mathews & L.Bolus, endemic
- Watsonia transvaalensis Baker, endemic
- Watsonia vanderspuyiae L.Bolus, endemic
- Watsonia versfeldii J.W.Mathews & L.Bolus, endemic
- Watsonia watsonioides (Baker) Oberm. indigenous
- Watsonia wilmaniae J.W.Mathews & L.Bolus, endemic
- Watsonia wilmsii L.Bolus, endemic
- Watsonia zeyheri L.Bolus, endemic

== Witsenia ==
Genus Witsenia:

- Witsenia maura Thunb. endemic
- Witsenia pyramidalis (Lam.) Pers. accepted as Lapeirousia pyramidalis (Lam.) Goldblatt subsp. pyramidalis

== Wuerthia ==
Genus Wuerthia:

- Wuerthia elegans Regel, accepted as Ixia polystachya L. indigenous

== Xenoscapa ==
Genus Xenoscapa:

- Xenoscapa fistulosa (Spreng. ex Klatt) Goldblatt & J.C.Manning, indigenous
- Xenoscapa grandiflora Goldblatt & J.C.Manning, indigenous
- Xenoscapa uliginosa Goldblatt & J.C.Manning, endemic
