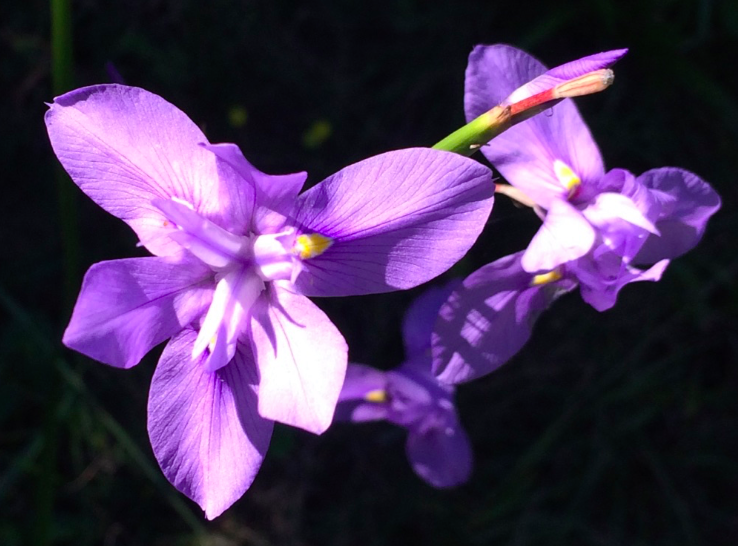

Scientific classification
- Kingdom: Plantae
- Clade: Tracheophytes
- Clade: Angiosperms
- Clade: Monocots
- Order: Asparagales
- Family: Iridaceae
- Genus: Moraea
- Species: M. polystachya

Binomial name
- Moraea polystachya (Thunb.) Ker Gawl.

= Moraea polystachya =

Species of flowering plant

Moraea polystachya is a species of plant in the family Iridaceae native to southern Africa.

== Description ==
Moraea polystachya is a herbaceous perennial geophyte growing to about 80mm high. Leaves are green, linear, long and narrow, resembling a grass blade. Flowers in clusters at the tip of branches. The flowers are blue to lilac and have a typical Iris appearance. It flowers mainly March to May (in the southern hemisphere). The plant is found in Namibia, Western Cape, Eastern Cape and North West Province of South Africa. The plant is listed as Least Concern in the SANBI redlist.
