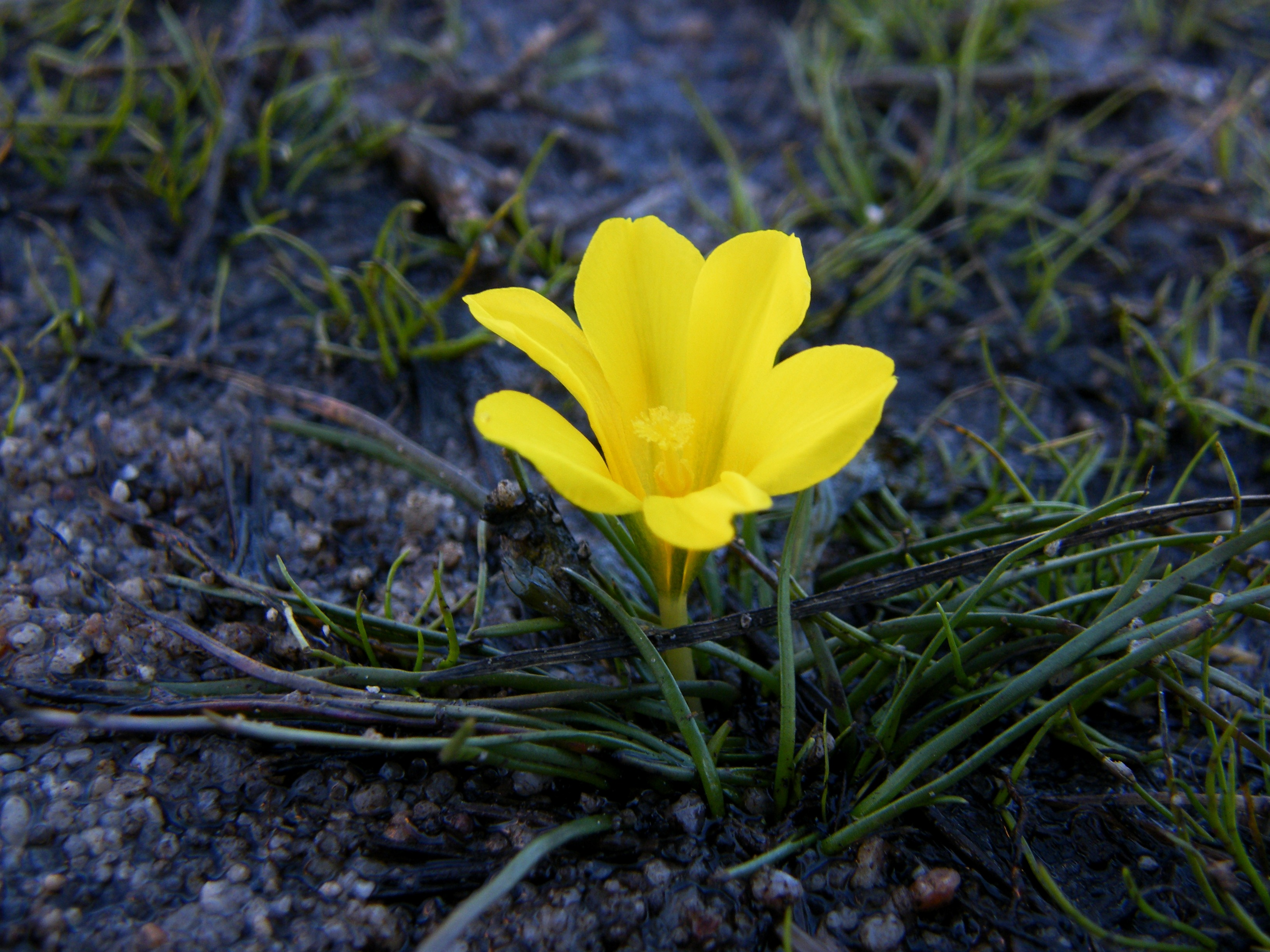

Scientific classification
- Kingdom: Plantae
- Clade: Tracheophytes
- Clade: Angiosperms
- Clade: Monocots
- Order: Asparagales
- Family: Iridaceae
- Genus: Moraea
- Species: M. fugacissima

Binomial name
- Moraea fugacissima (L.f.) Goldblatt

= Moraea fugacissima =

Species of flowering plant

Moraea fugacissima is a plant species in the family Iridaceae.
