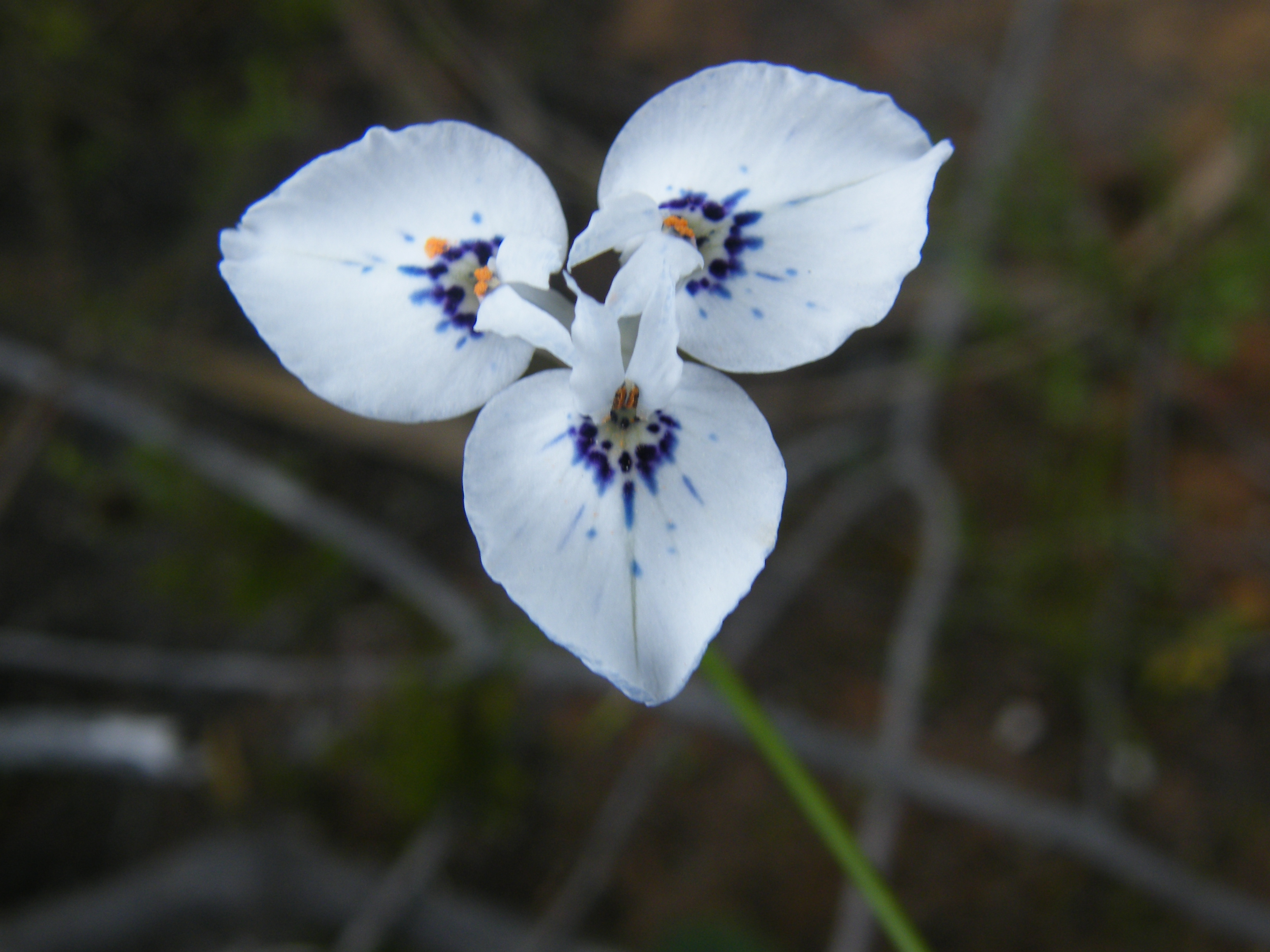

Scientific classification
- Kingdom: Plantae
- Clade: Tracheophytes
- Clade: Angiosperms
- Clade: Monocots
- Order: Asparagales
- Family: Iridaceae
- Genus: Moraea
- Species: M. barnardii

Binomial name
- Moraea barnardii L.Bolus

= Moraea barnardii =

Species of flowering plant

Moraea barnardii, commonly known in Afrikaans as the werf uintjie, is a plant and geophyte belonging to the genus Moraea; it is part of the fynbos vegetation. The species is endemic to the Western Cape and occurs near Caledon. There are two subpopulations, one consisting of ten plants and the other of 150 plants. It has lost large portions of its habitat to crop cultivation, overgrazing, and invasive plants—the latter currently posing the greatest threat.
