= Moraea aspera =

Scientific classification
- Kingdom: Plantae
- Clade: Tracheophytes
- Clade: Angiosperms
- Clade: Monocots
- Order: Asparagales
- Family: Iridaceae
- Genus: Moraea
- Species: M. aspera

Binomial name
- Moraea aspera Goldblatt

Synonyms
- Homeria spiralis L.Bolus

Species of flowering plant

Moraea aspera, commonly known as the rough capetulip, is a plant and geophyte belonging to the genus Moraea and is part of the Hantam Karoo. The species is endemic to the Northern Cape and occurs on the Bokkevelde escarpment. Here it has a range of 20 km^{2} and there are three subpopulations. The plant is threatened by the expansion of agricultural activities.
