= Moraea kamiesensis =

Scientific classification
- Kingdom: Plantae
- Clade: Tracheophytes
- Clade: Angiosperms
- Clade: Monocots
- Order: Asparagales
- Family: Iridaceae
- Genus: Moraea
- Species: M. kamiesensis

Binomial name
- Moraea kamiesensis Goldblatt

Synonyms
- Galaxia grandiflora Andrews

Species of flowering plant

Moraea kamiesensis, commonly known as the grand clockflower, is a plant and geophyte belonging to the genus Moraea and is part of the Namaqualand renosterveld. The species is endemic to the Northern Cape and occurs on the Kamiesberge. It has a range of less than 150 km^{2} and there are three subpopulations. The plant has already lost 50% of its habitat to crop cultivation in the past 50 years, the process is still ongoing and is being exacerbated by overgrazing and trampling by livestock.
