= Moraea insolens =

Scientific classification
- Kingdom: Plantae
- Clade: Tracheophytes
- Clade: Angiosperms
- Clade: Monocots
- Order: Asparagales
- Family: Iridaceae
- Genus: Moraea
- Species: M. insolens

Binomial name
- Moraea insolens Goldblatt

Synonyms
- Homeria maculata Klatt

Species of flowering plant

Moraea insolens, commonly known as the Overberg red-moraea, is a plant and geophyte belonging to the genus Moraea and is part of the fynbos. The species is endemic to the Western Cape and occurs from Caledon to Stanford. It has a range of less than 63 km² and there are three severely fragmented subpopulations remaining in areas that are not managed, the plants are not burned at all and invasive plants are also a threat.
