= Moraea venenata =

Scientific classification
- Kingdom: Plantae
- Clade: Tracheophytes
- Clade: Angiosperms
- Clade: Monocots
- Order: Asparagales
- Family: Iridaceae
- Genus: Moraea
- Species: M. venenata

Binomial name
- Moraea venenata Dinter

Synonyms
- Moraea polystachya var. brevicaulis E.Phillips; Moraea toxicaria Dinter

Species of flowering plant

Moraea venenata, commonly known as bloutulp or blue tulip, is a plant and geophyte belonging to the genus Moraea. The species is native to the Northern Cape and Namibia.
