= Moraea monticola =

Scientific classification
- Kingdom: Plantae
- Clade: Tracheophytes
- Clade: Angiosperms
- Clade: Monocots
- Order: Asparagales
- Family: Iridaceae
- Genus: Moraea
- Species: M. monticola

Binomial name
- Moraea monticola Goldblatt

Synonyms
- Roggeveldia montana Goldblatt

Species of plant

Moraea monticola is a species of flowering plant in the family Iridaceae. It is native to the Kamiesberge and Great Swartberg mountains of the western Cape Provinces. A cormous perennial, it may be available from commercial suppliers.
