= Moraea garipensis =

Conservation status
- Least Concern (IUCN 3.1)

Scientific classification
- Kingdom: Plantae
- Clade: Tracheophytes
- Clade: Angiosperms
- Clade: Monocots
- Order: Asparagales
- Family: Iridaceae
- Genus: Moraea
- Species: M. garipensis

Binomial name
- Moraea garipensis Goldblatt

Species of flowering plant

Moraea garipensis is a species of flowering plant in the family Iridaceae. It is endemic to Namibia. Its natural habitats are subtropical or tropical dry shrubland and rocky areas. It is threatened by habitat loss.
