= Moraea graniticola =

Conservation status
- Least Concern (IUCN 3.1)

Scientific classification
- Kingdom: Plantae
- Clade: Tracheophytes
- Clade: Angiosperms
- Clade: Monocots
- Order: Asparagales
- Family: Iridaceae
- Genus: Moraea
- Species: M. graniticola

Binomial name
- Moraea graniticola Goldblatt

Species of flowering plant

Moraea graniticola is a species of flowering plant in the family Iridaceae. It is endemic to Namibia. Its natural habitat is subtropical or tropical dry shrubland.
