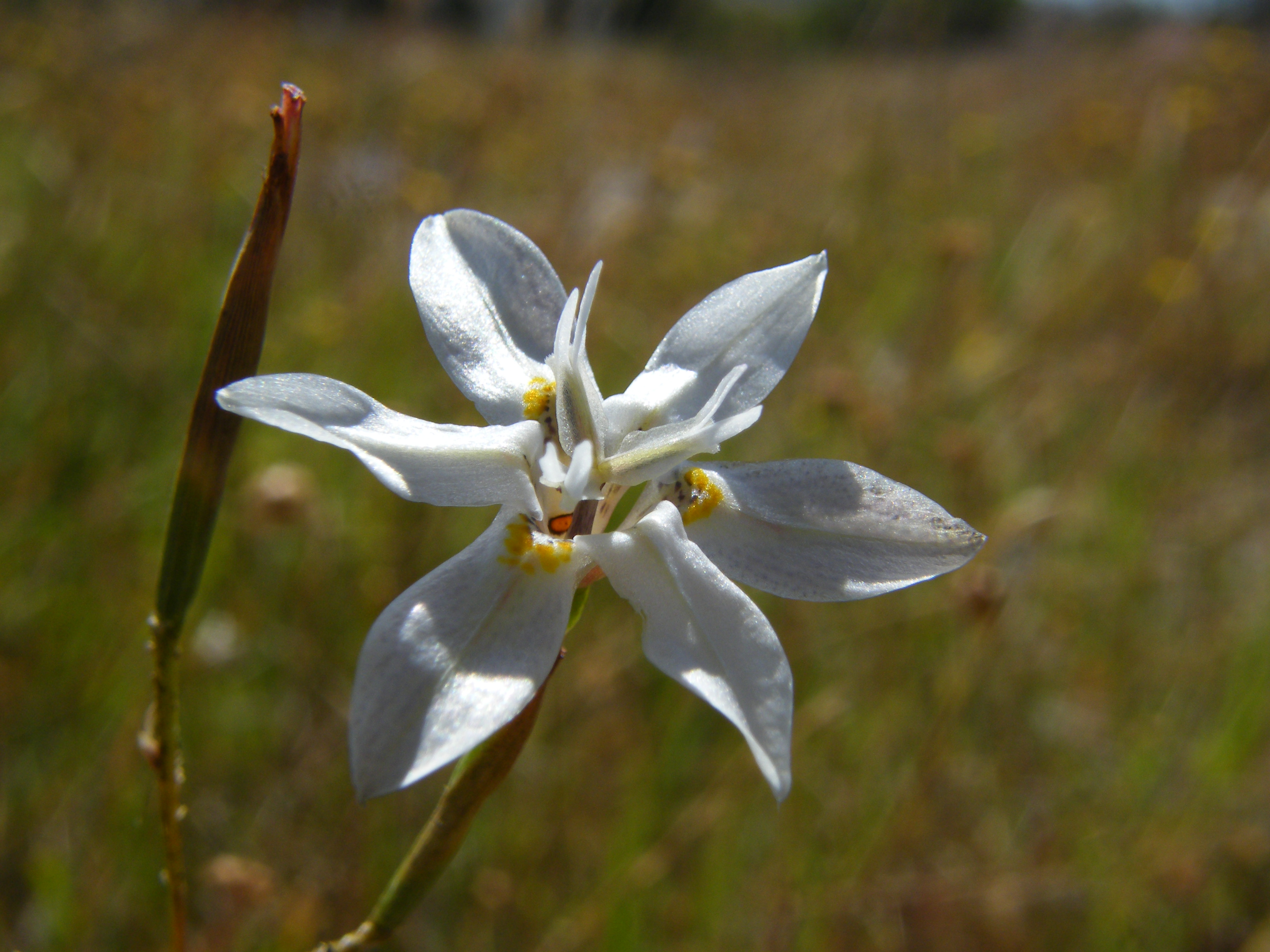
- Moraea viscaria

Scientific classification
- Kingdom: Plantae
- Clade: Tracheophytes
- Clade: Angiosperms
- Clade: Monocots
- Order: Asparagales
- Family: Iridaceae
- Subfamily: Iridoideae
- Tribe: Irideae
- Genus: Moraea; Mill.

Type species
- Moraea viscaria (L.f.) Ker Gawl.

Synonyms
- List: Barnardiella Goldblatt; Diaphane Salisb.; Freuchenia Eckl.; Galaxia Thunb.; Gynandriris Parl.; Helixyra Salisb. ex N.E.Br.; Hexaglottis Vent.; Homeria Vent.; Hymenostigma Hochst.; Iridopsis Welw. ex Baker; Jania Schult. & Schult.f.; Phaianthes Raf.; Plantia Herb. in Lindl.; Rheome Goldblatt; Roggeveldia Goldblatt; Sessilistigma Goldblatt; Sisyrinchium Mill. nom. illeg.; Vieusseuxia D.Delaroche

= Moraea =

Genus of flowering plants

Moraea, the Cape tulips, is a genus of plants in the family Iridaceae, first described as a genus in 1758. The group is widespread across Africa, the Mediterranean, and central and southwestern Asia. The genus name is a tribute to the English botanist Robert More.

== Description ==
Moraeas have iris-like flowers. The corms of some species have been used as food, however they are usually small and some species have an unpleasant taste, and some are poisonous.

== Taxonomy ==
The following species are recognised in the genus Moraea:

Selected species

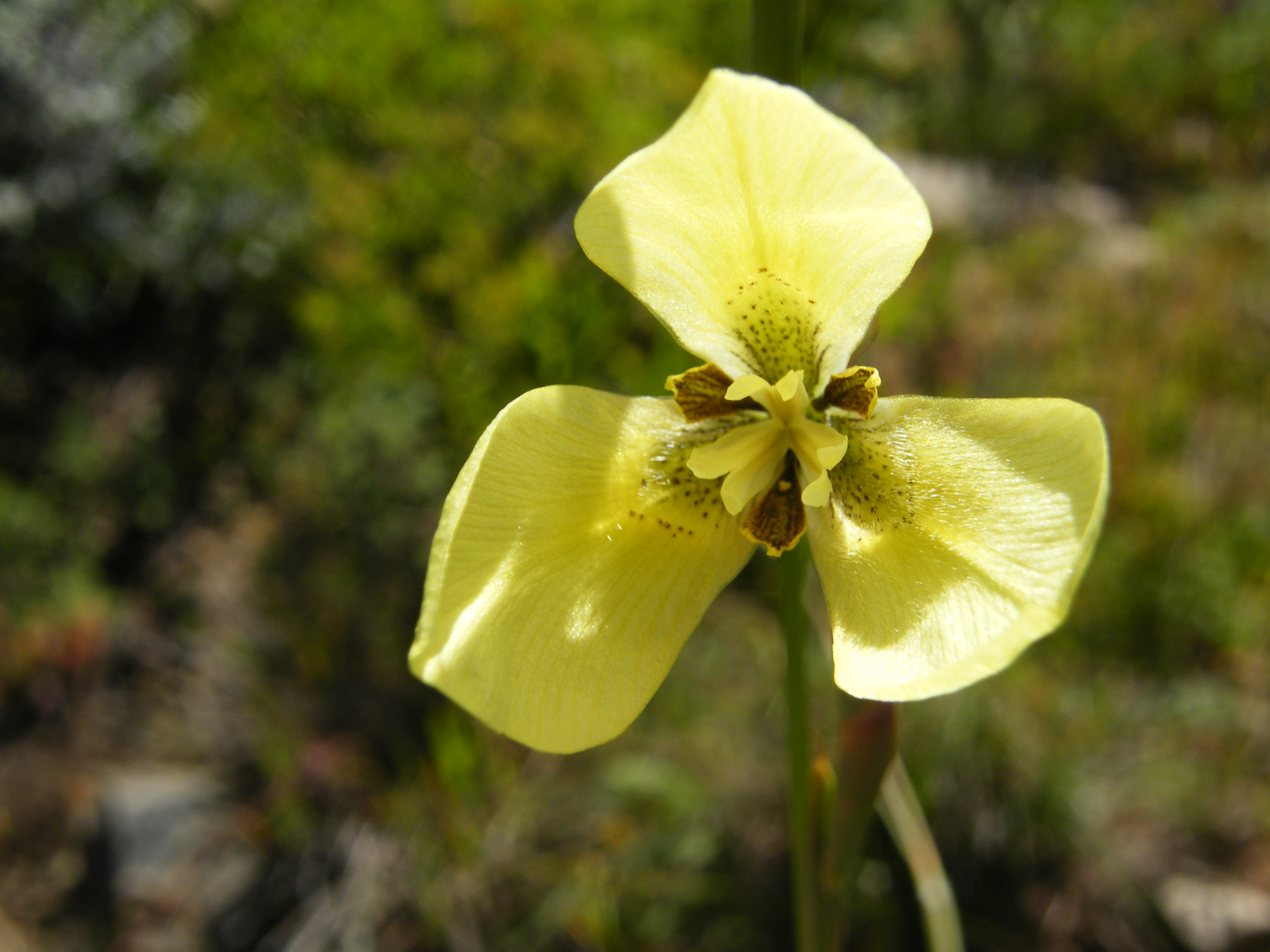
Moraea bellendenii

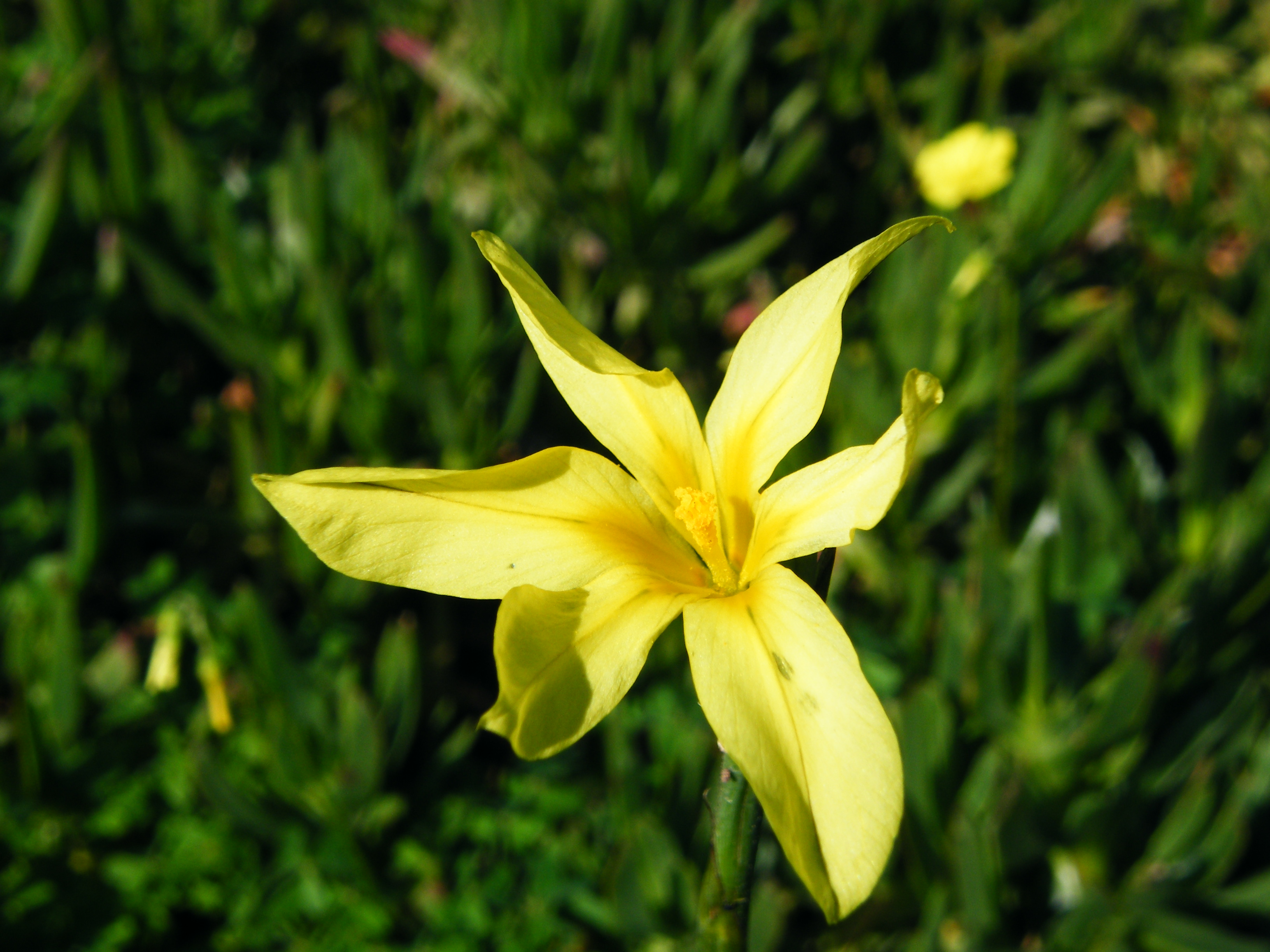
Moraea collina

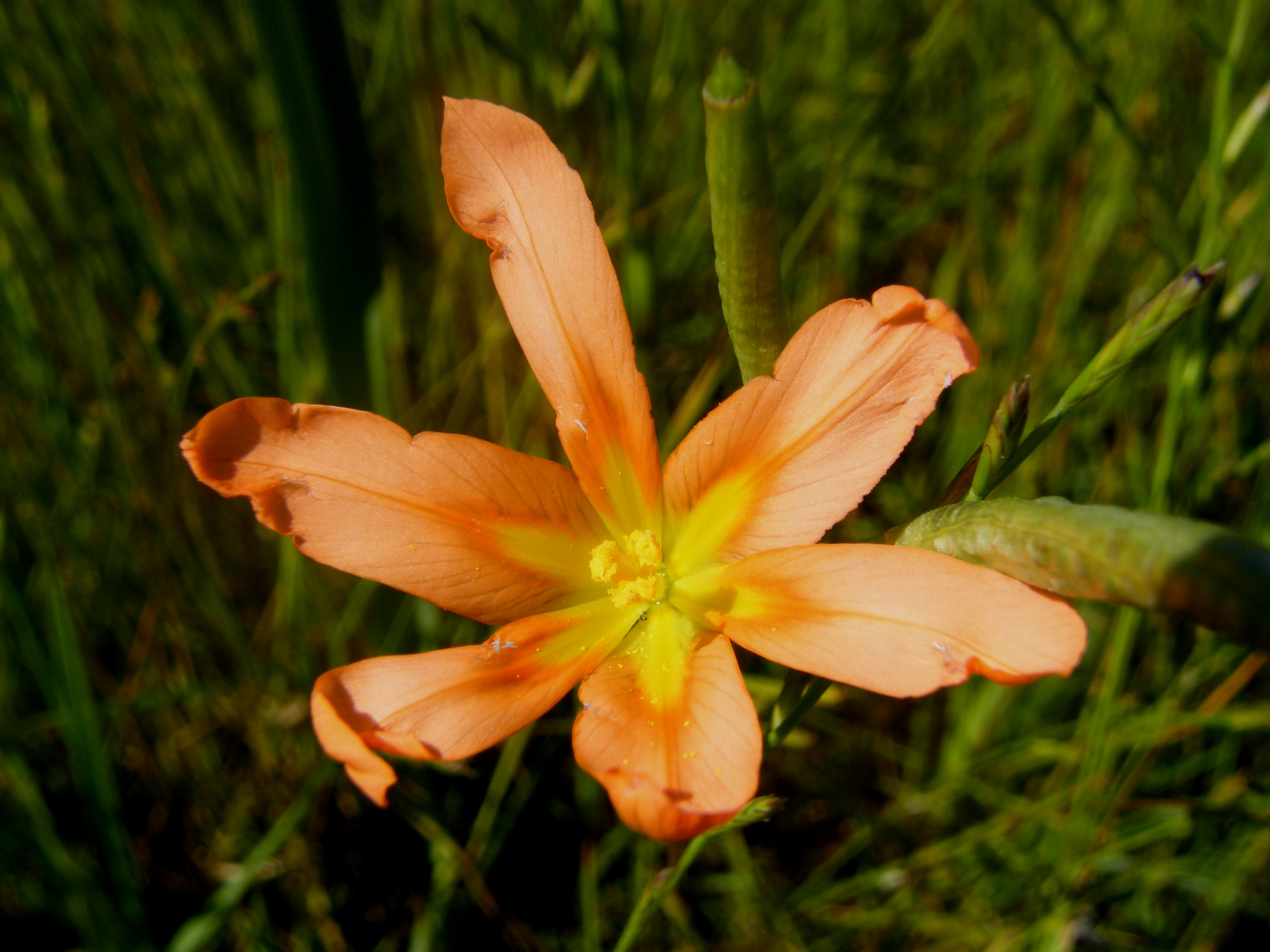
Moraea flaccida

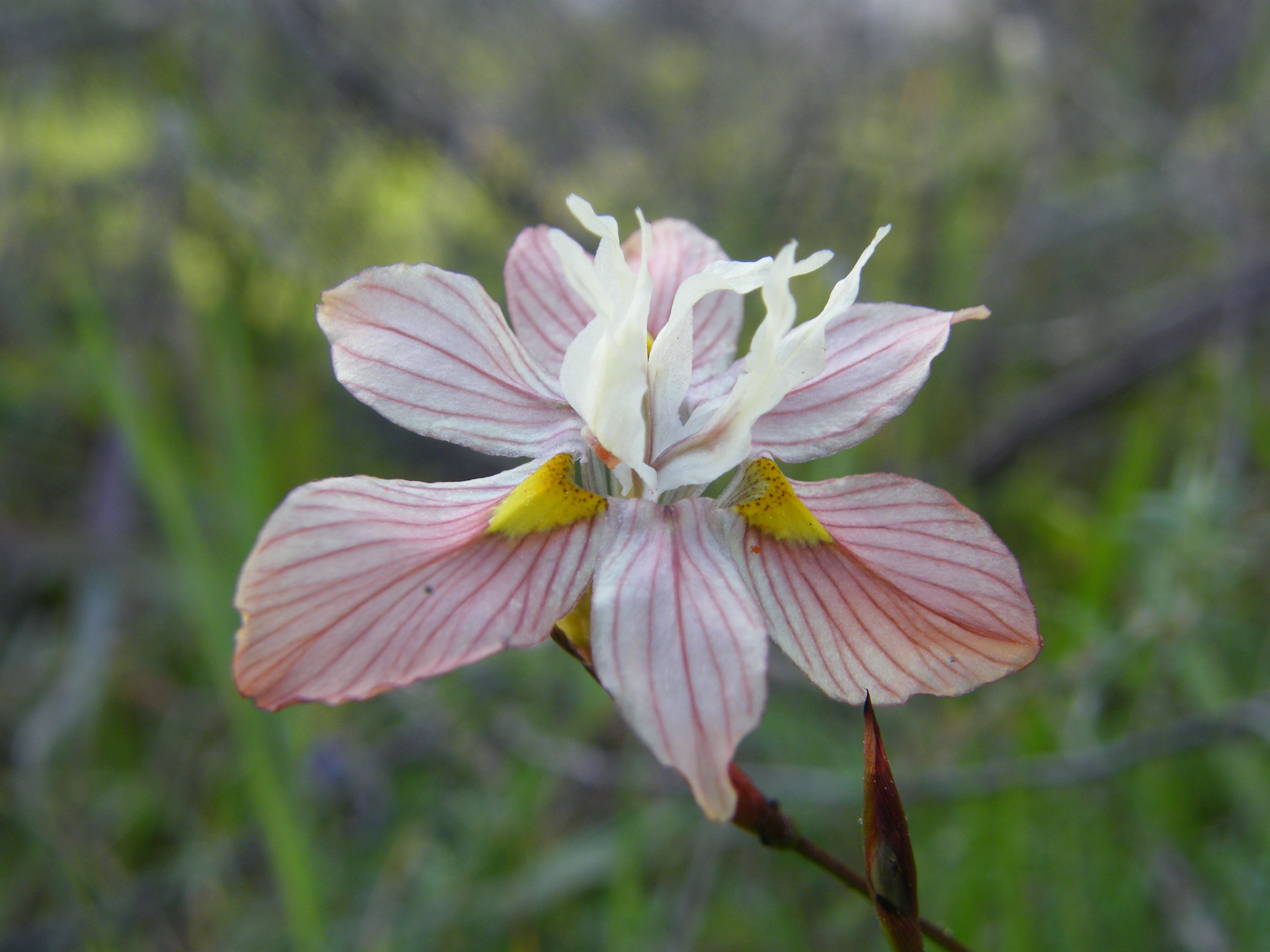
Moraea gawleri

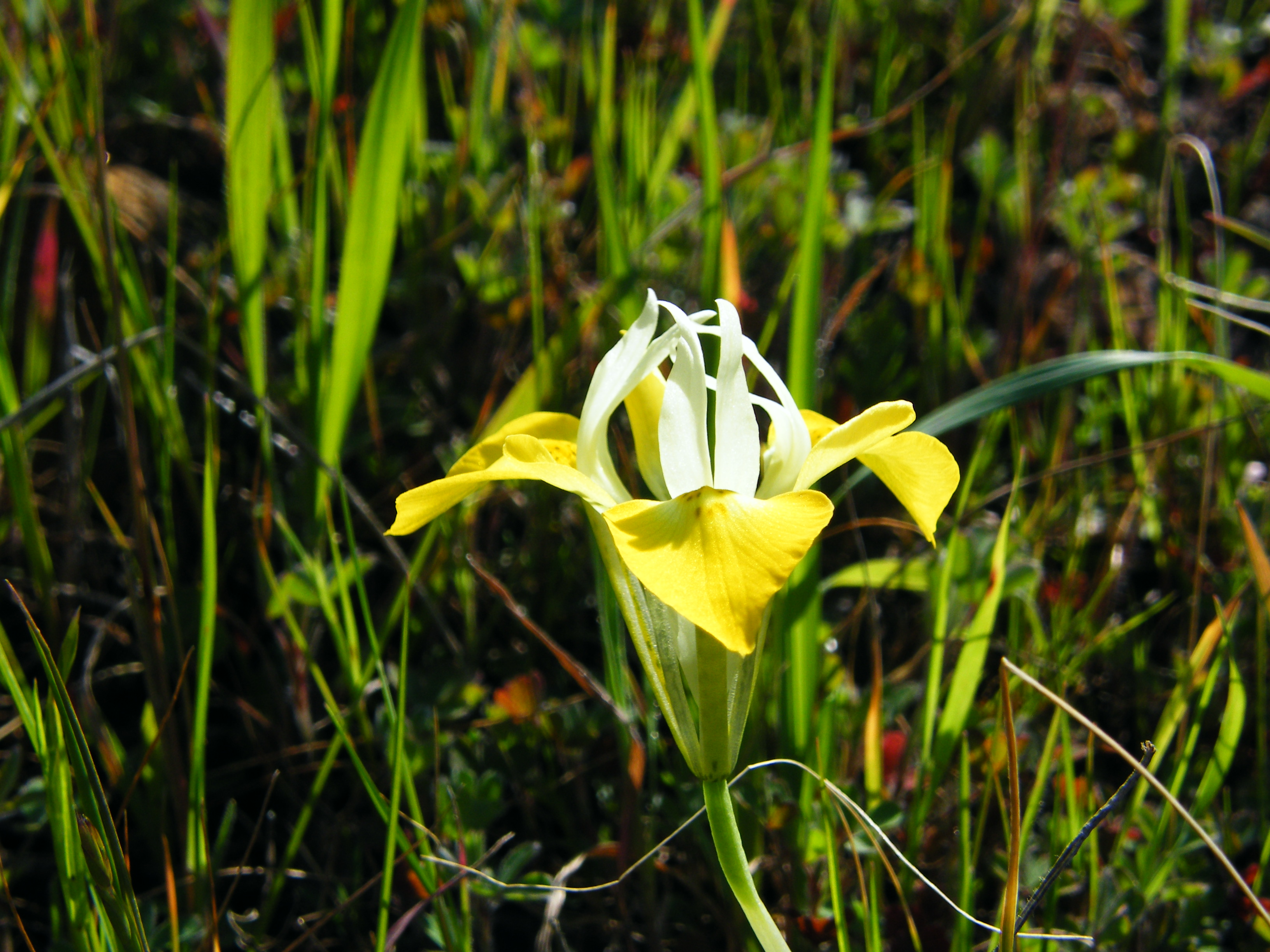
Moraea macronyx

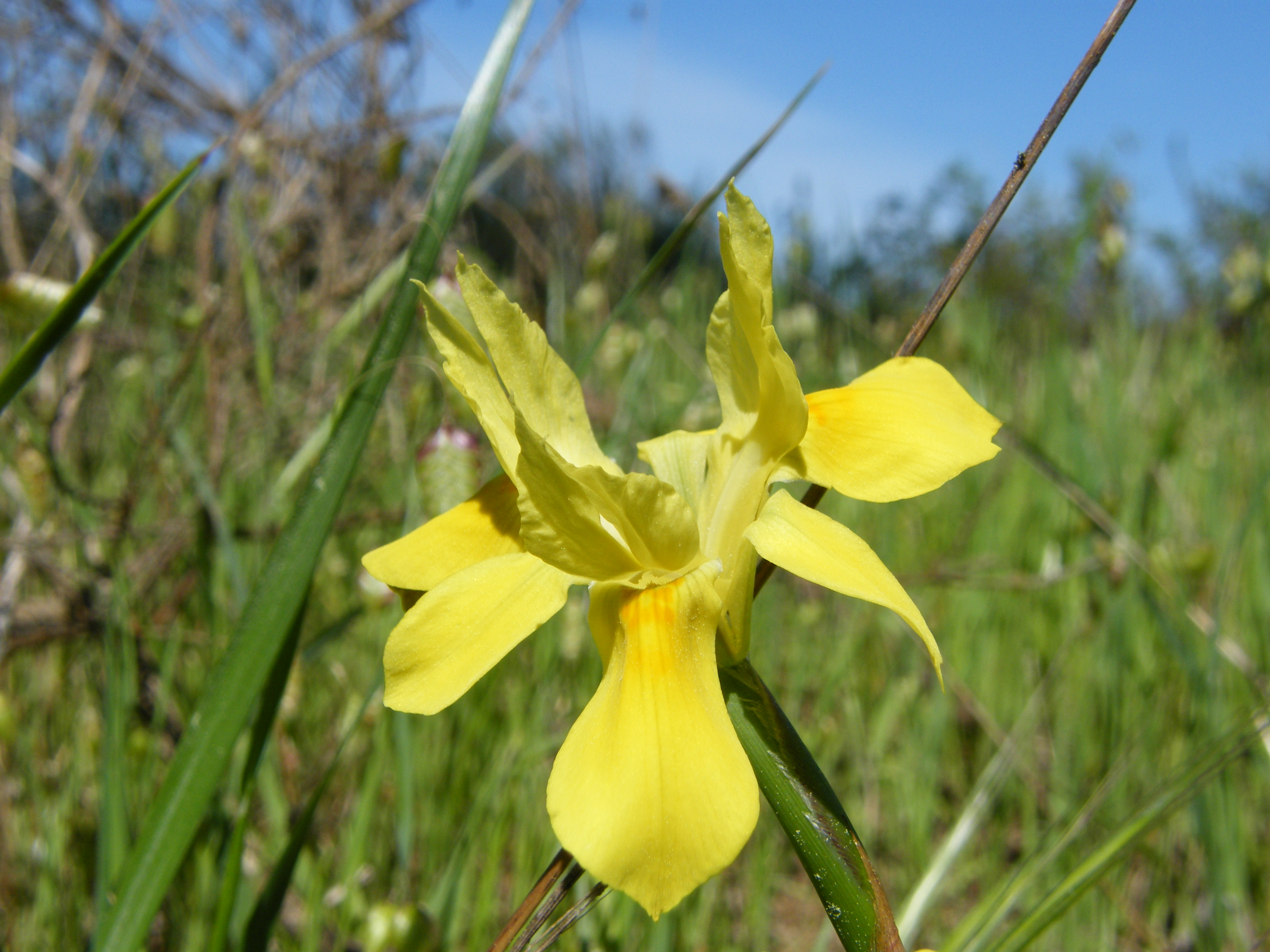
Moraea neglecta

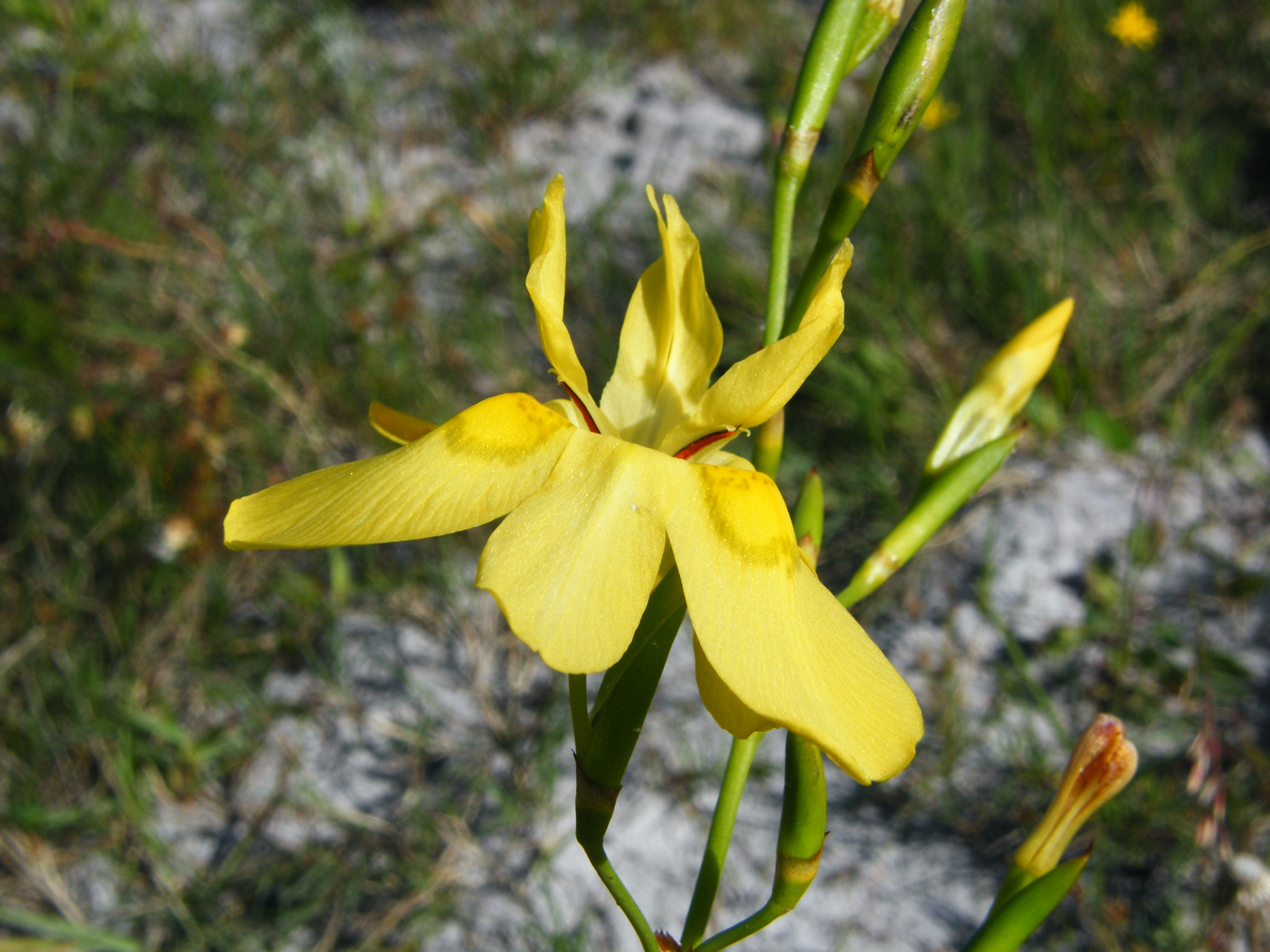
Moraea ramosissima

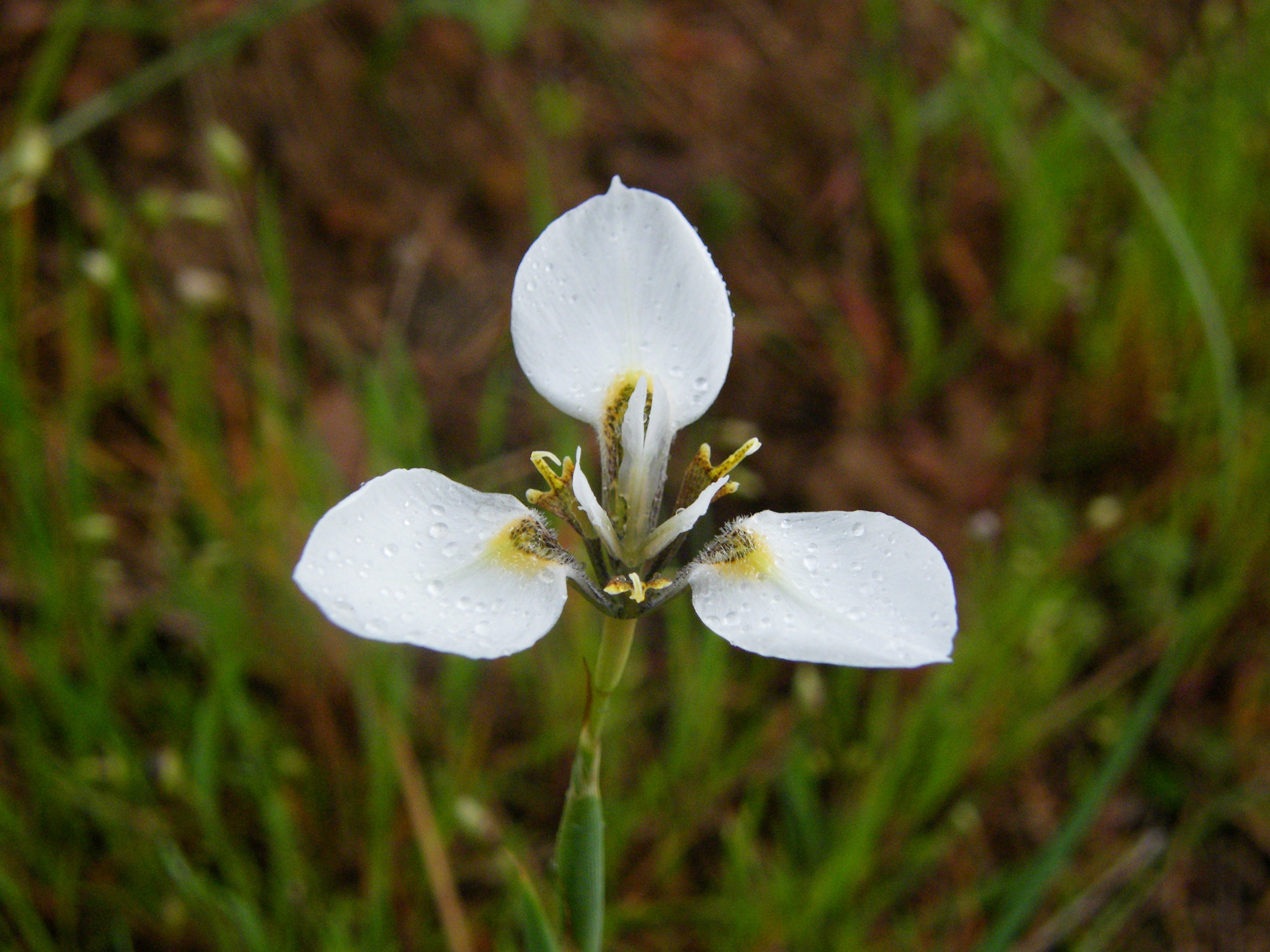
Moraea tricuspidata

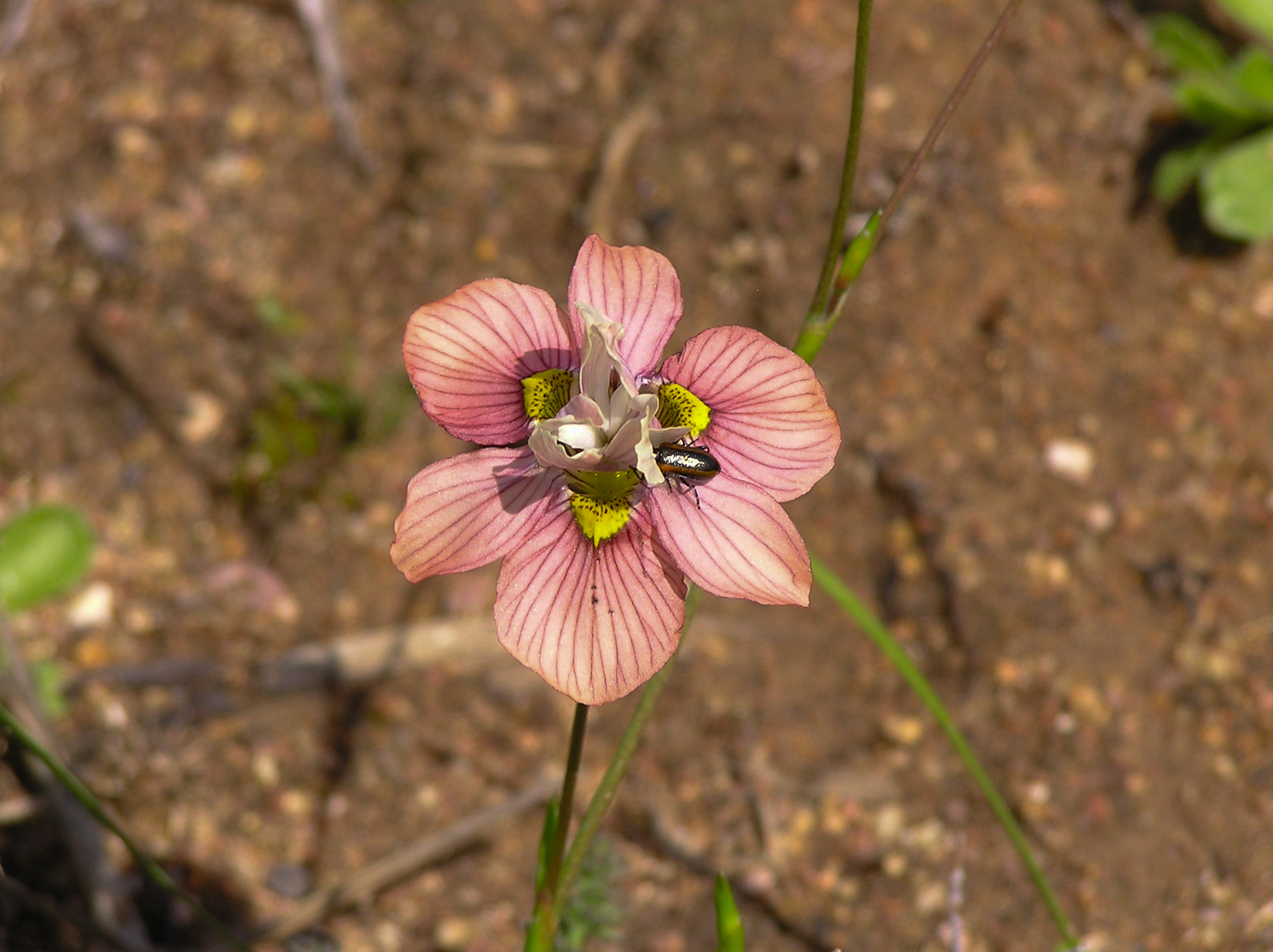
Moraea tricolor

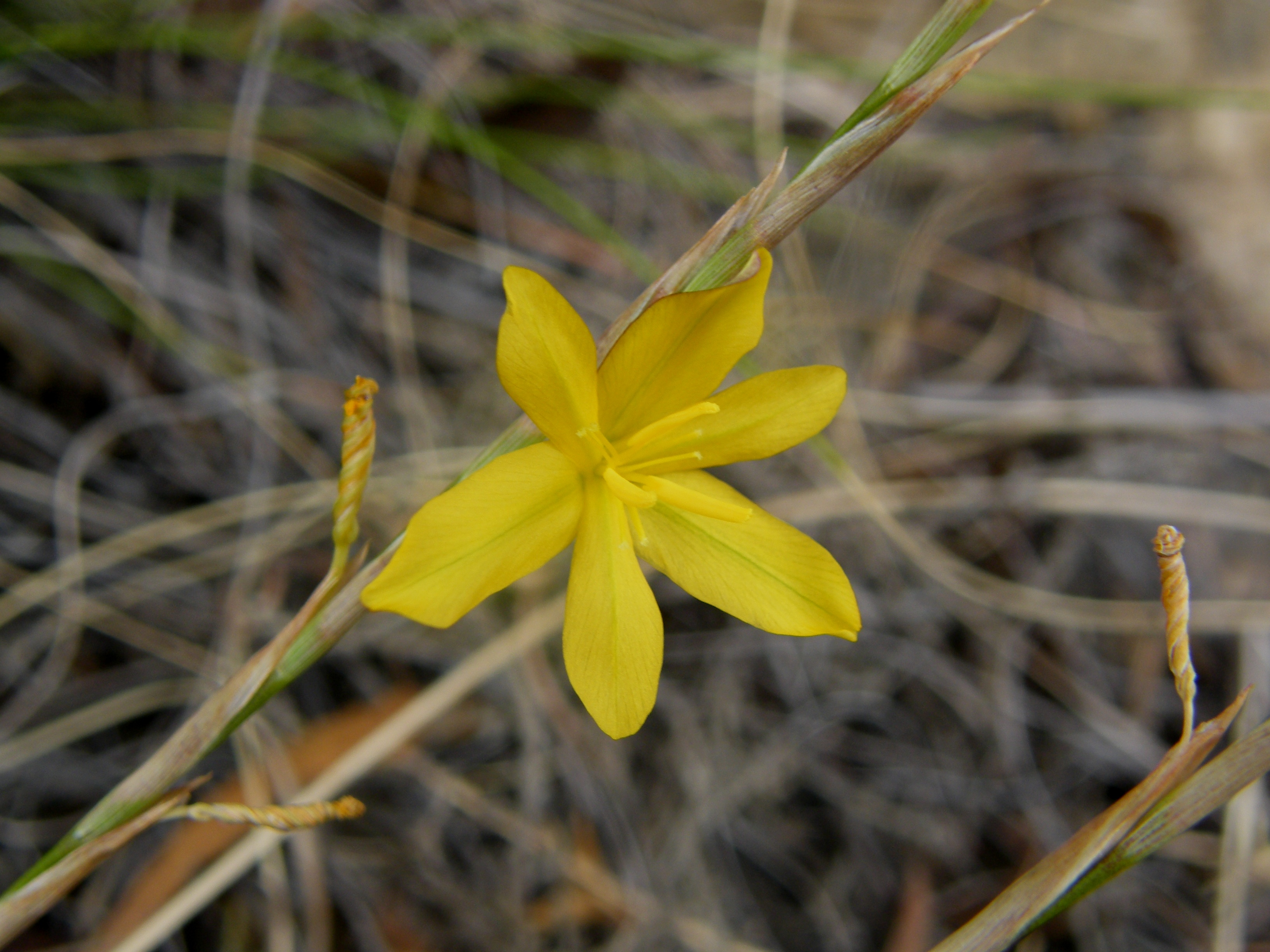
Moraea virgata

- Moraea acocksii Goldblatt & J.C.Manning
- Moraea afro-orientalis Goldblatt
- Moraea albicuspa Goldblatt
- Moraea albiflora (G.J.Lewis) Goldblatt
- Moraea algoensis Goldblatt
- Moraea alpina Goldblatt
- Moraea alticola Goldblatt
- Moraea amabilis Diels
- Moraea amissa Goldblatt
- Moraea angolensis Goldblatt
- Moraea angulata Goldblatt
- Moraea angusta (Thunb.) Ker Gawl.
- Moraea anomala G.J.Lewis
- Moraea ardesiaca Goldblatt
- Moraea aristata (D.Delaroche) Asch. & Graebn.
- Moraea aspera Goldblatt
- Moraea atromontana Goldblatt & J.C.Manning
- Moraea atropunctata Goldblatt
- Moraea australis (Goldblatt) Goldblatt
- Moraea autumnalis (Goldblatt) Goldblatt
- Moraea balundana Goldblatt
- Moraea barkerae Goldblatt
- Moraea barnardiella Goldblatt
- Moraea barnardii L.Bolus
- Moraea bella Harms
- Moraea bellendenii (Sweet) N.E.Br.
- Moraea bifida (L.Bolus) Goldblatt
- Moraea bipartita L.Bolus
- Moraea bituminosa (L.f.) Ker Gawl.
- Moraea bolusii Baker
- Moraea bovonei Chiov.
- Moraea brachygyne (Schltr.) Goldblatt
- Moraea brevifolia Goldblatt
- Moraea brevistyla (Goldblatt) Goldblatt
- Moraea brevituba (Goldblatt) Goldblatt
- Moraea britteniae (L.Bolus) Goldblatt
- Moraea bubalina Goldblatt
- Moraea bulbillifera (G.J.Lewis) Goldblatt
- Moraea caeca Barnard ex Goldblatt
- Moraea calcicola Goldblatt
- Moraea callista Goldblatt
- Moraea cantharophila Goldblatt & J.C.Manning
- Moraea carnea Goldblatt
- Moraea carsonii Baker
- Moraea cedarmontana (Goldblatt) Goldblatt
- Moraea cedarmonticola Goldblatt
- Moraea ciliata (L.f.) Ker Gawl.
- Moraea cistiflora Goldblatt & J.C.Manning
- Moraea citrina (G.J.Lewis) Goldblatt
- Moraea clavata R.C.Foster
- Moraea collina Thunb.
- Moraea comptonii (L.Bolus) Goldblatt
- Moraea contorta Goldblatt
- Moraea cookii (L.Bolus) Goldblatt
- Moraea cooperi Baker
- Moraea crispa Thunb.
- Moraea cuspidata Goldblatt & J.C.Manning
- Moraea debilis Goldblatt
- Moraea decipiens Goldblatt & J.C.Manning
- Moraea deltoidea Goldblatt & J.C.Manning
- Moraea demissa Goldblatt
- Moraea deserticola Goldblatt
- Moraea doleritica Goldblatt & J.C.Manning
- Moraea dracomontana Goldblatt
- Moraea eburnea Goldblatt & J.C.Manning
- Moraea elegans Jacq.
- Moraea elliotii Baker
- Moraea elsiae Goldblatt
- Moraea exiliflora Goldblatt
- Moraea falcifolia Klatt
- Moraea fenestralis (Goldblatt & E.G.H.Oliv.) Goldblatt
- Moraea fenestrata (Goldblatt) Goldblatt
- Moraea fergusoniae L.Bolus
- Moraea filamentosa Goldblatt & J.C.Manning
- Moraea filicaulis Baker
- Moraea fistulosa (Goldblatt) Goldblatt
- Moraea flaccida (Sweet) Steud.
- Moraea flava Goldblatt & J.C.Manning
- Moraea flavescens (Goldblatt) Goldblatt
- Moraea flexicaulis Goldblatt
- Moraea fragrans Goldblatt
- Moraea fugacissima (L.f.) Goldblatt
- Moraea fugax (D.Delaroche) Jacq.
- Moraea fuscomontana (Goldblatt) Goldblatt
- Moraea galaxia (L.f.) Goldblatt & J.C.Manning
- Moraea galpinii (Baker) N.E.Br.
- Moraea garipensis Goldblatt
- Moraea gawleri Spreng.
- Moraea geminifolia Goldblatt & J.C.Manning
- Moraea gigandra L.Bolus
- Moraea gracilenta Goldblatt
- Moraea graminicola Oberm.
- Moraea grandis Goldblatt & J.C.Manning
- Moraea graniticola Goldblatt
- Moraea hainebachiana Goldblatt & J.C.Manning
- Moraea helicoidea Goldblatt & J.C.Manning
- Moraea helmei Goldblatt & J.C.Manning
- Moraea herrei (L.Bolus) Goldblatt
- Moraea hesperantha (Goldblatt) Goldblatt
- Moraea hexaglottis Goldblatt
- Moraea hiemalis Goldblatt
- Moraea huttonii (Baker) Oberm.
- Moraea inclinata Goldblatt
- Moraea inconspicua Goldblatt
- Moraea incurva G.J.Lewis
- Moraea indecora Goldblatt
- Moraea insolens Goldblatt
- Moraea intermedia Goldblatt & J.C.Manning
- Moraea inyangani Goldblatt
- Moraea iringensis Goldblatt
- Moraea kamiesensis Goldblatt
- Moraea kamiesmontana (Goldblatt) Goldblatt
- Moraea karooica Goldblatt
- Moraea knersvlaktensis Goldblatt
- Moraea lazulina Goldblatt & J.C.Manning
- Moraea lewisiae (Goldblatt) Goldblatt
- Moraea lilacina Goldblatt & J.C.Manning
- Moraea linderi Goldblatt
- Moraea longiaristata Goldblatt
- Moraea longiflora Ker Gawl.
- Moraea longifolia (Jacq.) Pers.
- Moraea longipes Goldblatt & J.C.Manning
- Moraea longistyla (Goldblatt) Goldblatt
- Moraea loubseri Goldblatt
- Moraea louisabolusiae Goldblatt
- Moraea lugubris (Salisb.) Goldblatt
- Moraea lurida Ker Gawl.
- Moraea luteoalba (Goldblatt) Goldblatt
- Moraea macgregoriorum Goldblatt
- Moraea macrantha Baker
- Moraea macrocarpa Goldblatt
- Moraea macronyx G.J.Lewis
- Moraea margaretae Goldblatt
- Moraea marginata J.C.Manning & Goldblatt
- Moraea marionae N.E.Br.
- Moraea marlothii (L.Bolus) Goldblatt
- Moraea maximiliani (Schltr.) Goldblatt & J.C.Manning
- Moraea mediterranea Goldblatt
- Moraea melanops Goldblatt & J.C.Manning
- Moraea miniata Andrews
- Moraea minima Goldblatt
- Moraea minor Eckl.
- Moraea modesta Killick
- Moraea moggii N.E.Br.
- Moraea monticola Goldblatt
- Moraea muddii N.E.Br.
- Moraea mutila (Eckl.) Goldblatt & J.C.Manning
- Moraea namaquamontana Goldblatt
- Moraea namaquana (Goldblatt) Goldblatt
- Moraea namibensis Goldblatt
- Moraea nana (L.Bolus) Goldblatt & J.C.Manning
- Moraea natalensis Baker
- Moraea neglecta G.J.Lewis
- Moraea niassensis Goldblatt & J.C.Manning
- Moraea nubigena Goldblatt
- Moraea ochroleuca (Salisb.) Drapiez
- Moraea ogamana Goldblatt & J.C.Manning
- Moraea orthrosantha Goldblatt & J.C.Manning
- Moraea pallida (Baker) Goldblatt
- Moraea papilionacea (L.f.) Ker Gawl.
- Moraea patens (Goldblatt) Goldblatt
- Moraea pearsonii Goldblatt & J.C.Manning
- Moraea pendula (Goldblatt) Goldblatt
- Moraea petricola Goldblatt & J.C.Manning
- Moraea pilifolia Goldblatt
- Moraea polyanthos L.f.
- Moraea polystachya (Thunb.) Ker Gawl.
- Moraea pritzeliana Diels
- Moraea pseudospicata Goldblatt
- Moraea pubiflora N.E.Br.
- Moraea pyrophila Goldblatt
- Moraea quartzicola Goldblatt & J.C.Manning
- Moraea radians (Goldblatt) Goldblatt
- Moraea ramosissima (L.f.) Druce
- Moraea reflexa Goldblatt
- Moraea regalis Goldblatt & J.C.Manning
- Moraea reticulata Goldblatt
- Moraea rigidifolia Goldblatt
- Moraea riparia (Goldblatt) Goldblatt
- Moraea rivulicola Goldblatt & J.C.Manning
- Moraea robusta (Goldblatt) Goldblatt
- Moraea saldanhensis Goldblatt & J.C.Manning
- Moraea saxicola Goldblatt
- Moraea schimperi (Hochst.) Pic.Serm.
- Moraea schlechteri (L.Bolus) Goldblatt
- Moraea serpentina Baker
- Moraea serratostyla (Goldblatt) Goldblatt
- Moraea setifolia (L.f.) Druce
- Moraea simplex Goldblatt & J.C.Manning
- Moraea simulans Baker
- Moraea singularis Goldblatt & J.C.Manning
- Moraea sisyrinchium (L.) Ker Gawl.
- Moraea spathulata (L.f.) Klatt
- Moraea speciosa (L.Bolus) Goldblatt
- Moraea stagnalis (Goldblatt) Goldblatt
- Moraea striata Goldblatt & J.C.Manning
- Moraea stricta Baker
- Moraea tanquana Goldblatt & J.C.Manning
- Moraea tanzanica Goldblatt
- Moraea teretifolia Goldblatt & J.C.Manning
- Moraea textilis (Welw. ex Baker) Baker
- Moraea thermarum Goldblatt & J.C.Manning
- Moraea thomasiae Goldblatt
- Moraea thomsonii Baker
- Moraea tortilis Goldblatt
- Moraea tricolor Andrews
- Moraea tricuspidata (L.f.) G.J.Lewis
- Moraea trifida R.C.Foster
- Moraea tripetala (L.f.) Ker Gawl.
- Moraea tulbaghensis L.Bolus
- Moraea umbellata Thunb.
- Moraea unguiculata Ker Gawl.
- Moraea unibracteata Goldblatt
- Moraea unifoliata R.C.Foster
- Moraea upembana Goldblatt
- Moraea vallisavium Goldblatt
- Moraea vallisbelli (Goldblatt) Goldblatt
- Moraea variabilis (G.J.Lewis) Goldblatt
- Moraea vegeta L.
- Moraea venenata Dinter
- Moraea ventricosa Baker
- Moraea verdickii De Wild.
- Moraea verecunda Goldblatt
- Moraea versicolor (Salisb. ex Klatt) Goldblatt
- Moraea vespertina Goldblatt & J.C.Manning
- Moraea vigilans Goldblatt & J.C.Manning
- Moraea villosa (Ker Gawl.) Ker Gawl.
- Moraea virgata Jacq.
- Moraea viscaria (L.f.) Ker Gawl.
- Moraea vlokii Goldblatt
- Moraea vuvuzela Goldblatt & J.C.Manning
- Moraea worcesterensis Goldblatt
