= Moraea flavescens =

Scientific classification
- Kingdom: Plantae
- Clade: Tracheophytes
- Clade: Angiosperms
- Clade: Monocots
- Order: Asparagales
- Family: Iridaceae
- Genus: Moraea
- Species: M. flavescens

Binomial name
- Moraea flavescens (Goldblatt) Goldblatt

Synonyms
- Homeria flavescens Goldblatt

Species of flowering plant

Moraea flavescens is a plant and geophyte belonging to the genus Moraea and is part of the fynbos. The species is endemic to the Western Cape and occurs from the Bokkeveld Mountains to the Cederberg.
