= Moraea autumnalis =

Scientific classification
- Kingdom: Plantae
- Clade: Tracheophytes
- Clade: Angiosperms
- Clade: Monocots
- Order: Asparagales
- Family: Iridaceae
- Genus: Moraea
- Species: M. autumnalis

Binomial name
- Moraea autumnalis (Goldblatt) Goldblatt

Synonyms
- Homeria autumnalis Goldblatt

Species of flowering plant

Moraea autumnalis is a plant and geophyte belonging to the genus Moraea and is part of the fynbos. The species is endemic to the Western Cape and occurs in the Koue Bokkeveld and Elandskloof where there are two subpopulations. The plant flowers just after it has burned.
