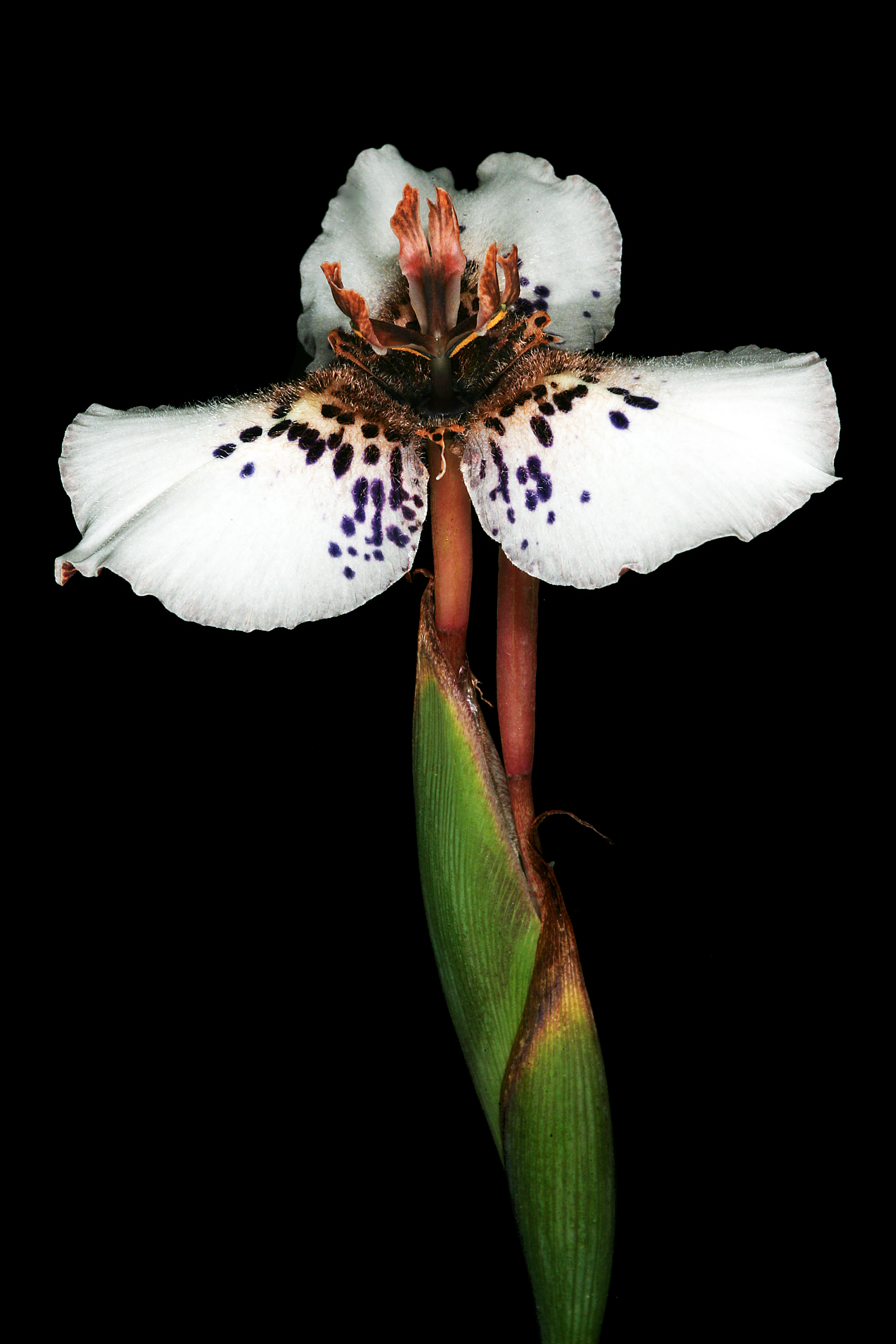

Scientific classification
- Kingdom: Plantae
- Clade: Tracheophytes
- Clade: Angiosperms
- Clade: Monocots
- Order: Asparagales
- Family: Iridaceae
- Genus: Moraea
- Species: M. atropunctata

Binomial name
- Moraea atropunctata Goldblatt

= Moraea atropunctata =

Species of flowering plant

Moraea atropunctata, commonly known as the spotty flappy, is a plant and geophyte belonging to the genus Moraea and is part of the renosterveld. The species is endemic to the Western Cape and occurs on the Eseljagberg near Villiersdorp. Here it has a range of less than 1 km^{2} and there is only one population. The plant is threatened by overgrazing and the picking of the flowers by illegal collectors. A survey in 2003 counted only 320 plants.
