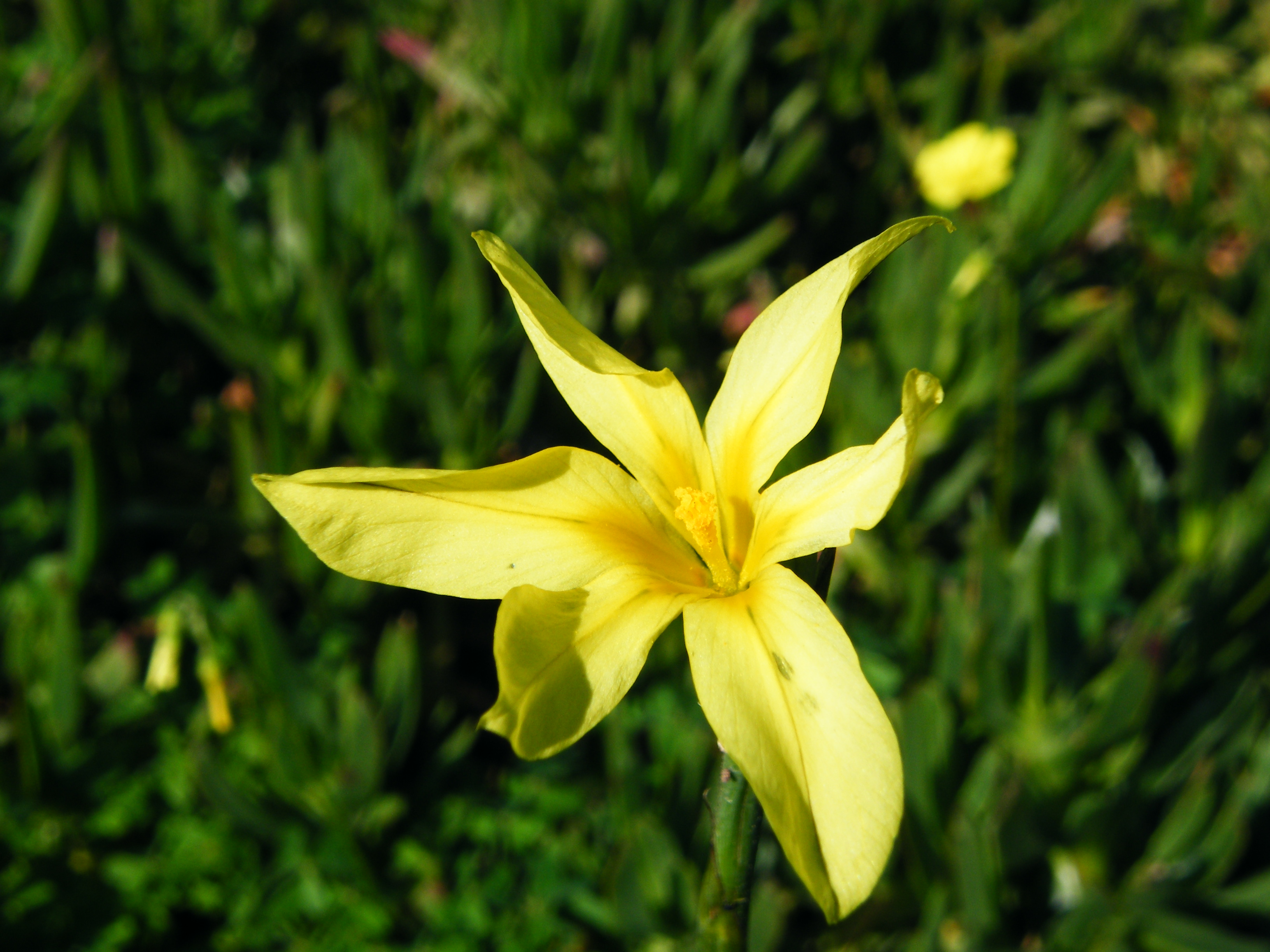

Conservation status
- Least Concern (SANBI Red List)

Scientific classification
- Kingdom: Plantae
- Clade: Tracheophytes
- Clade: Angiosperms
- Clade: Monocots
- Order: Asparagales
- Family: Iridaceae
- Genus: Moraea
- Species: M. collina

Binomial name
- Moraea collina Thunb.

Synonyms
- Homeria collina (Thunb.) Salisb.

= Moraea collina =

Species of flowering plant

Moraea collina is a species of the genus Moraea, in the family Iridaceae. It was formerly known as Homeria collina.

== Distribution ==
The plant is endemic to the Western Cape, from Baines Kloof to Caledon. It is common on lower slopes and flats of Fynbos habitats.

== Description ==
Moraea collina is a cormous geophyte, growing 15–50 centimetres (5.9–19.7 in) high.

It has a simple or branched stem and a single sheath shaped leaf. The plant is not sticky to the touch.

Flowers are yellow (or pale salmon pink) with yellow nectar guides. The outer tepals form a cup. It flowers from July to September, with flowers opening in the afternoon.

== Conservation ==
Moraea collina is listed as a plant species of Least Concern on the National Red List of South African plants.
