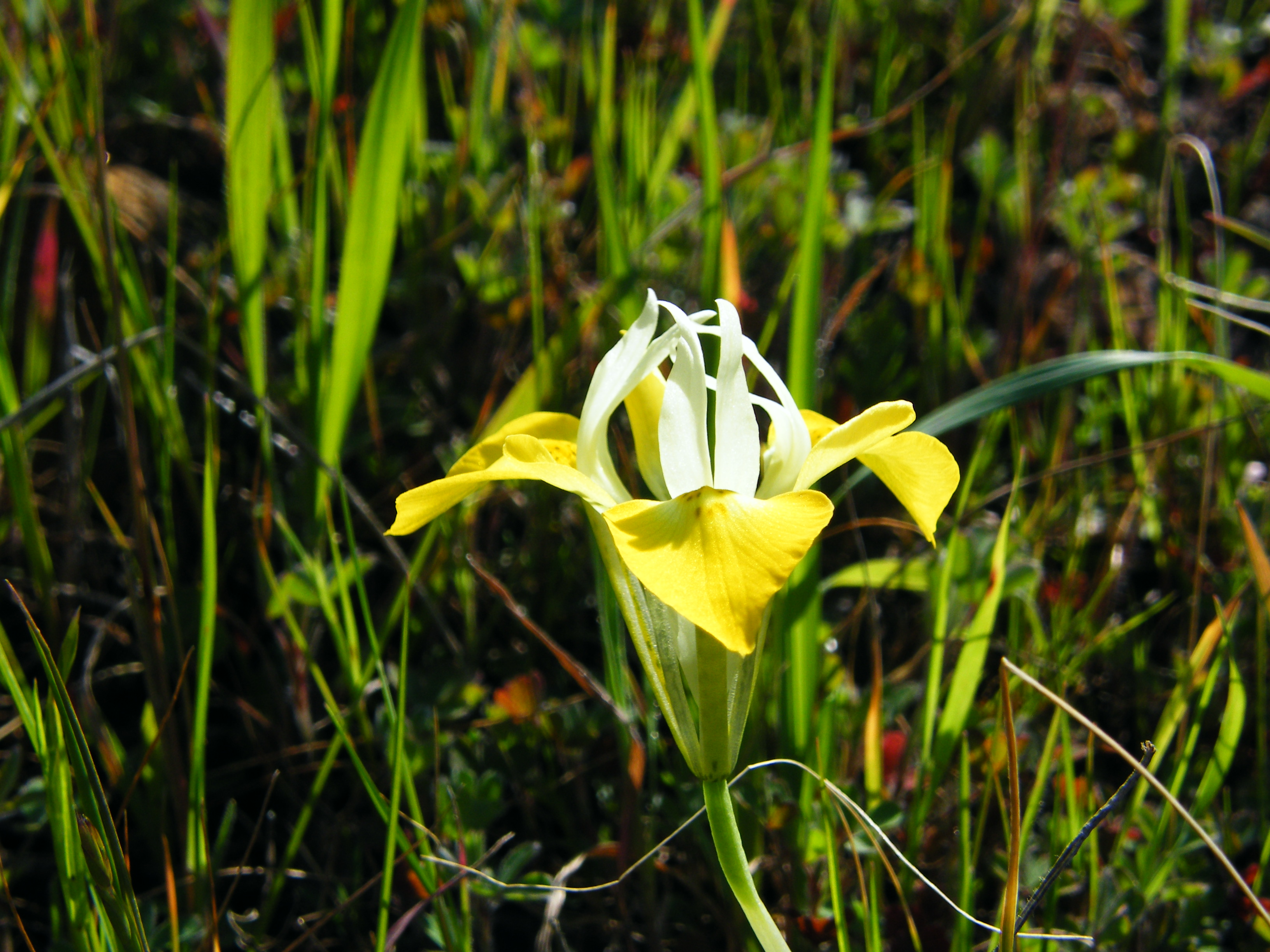

Scientific classification
- Kingdom: Plantae
- Clade: Tracheophytes
- Clade: Angiosperms
- Clade: Monocots
- Order: Asparagales
- Family: Iridaceae
- Genus: Moraea
- Species: M. macronyx

Binomial name
- Moraea macronyx G.J. Lewis 1954

= Moraea macronyx =

Species of flowering plant

Moraea macronyx is a species of plant in the family Iridaceae. It is found in Western Cape, South Africa.
