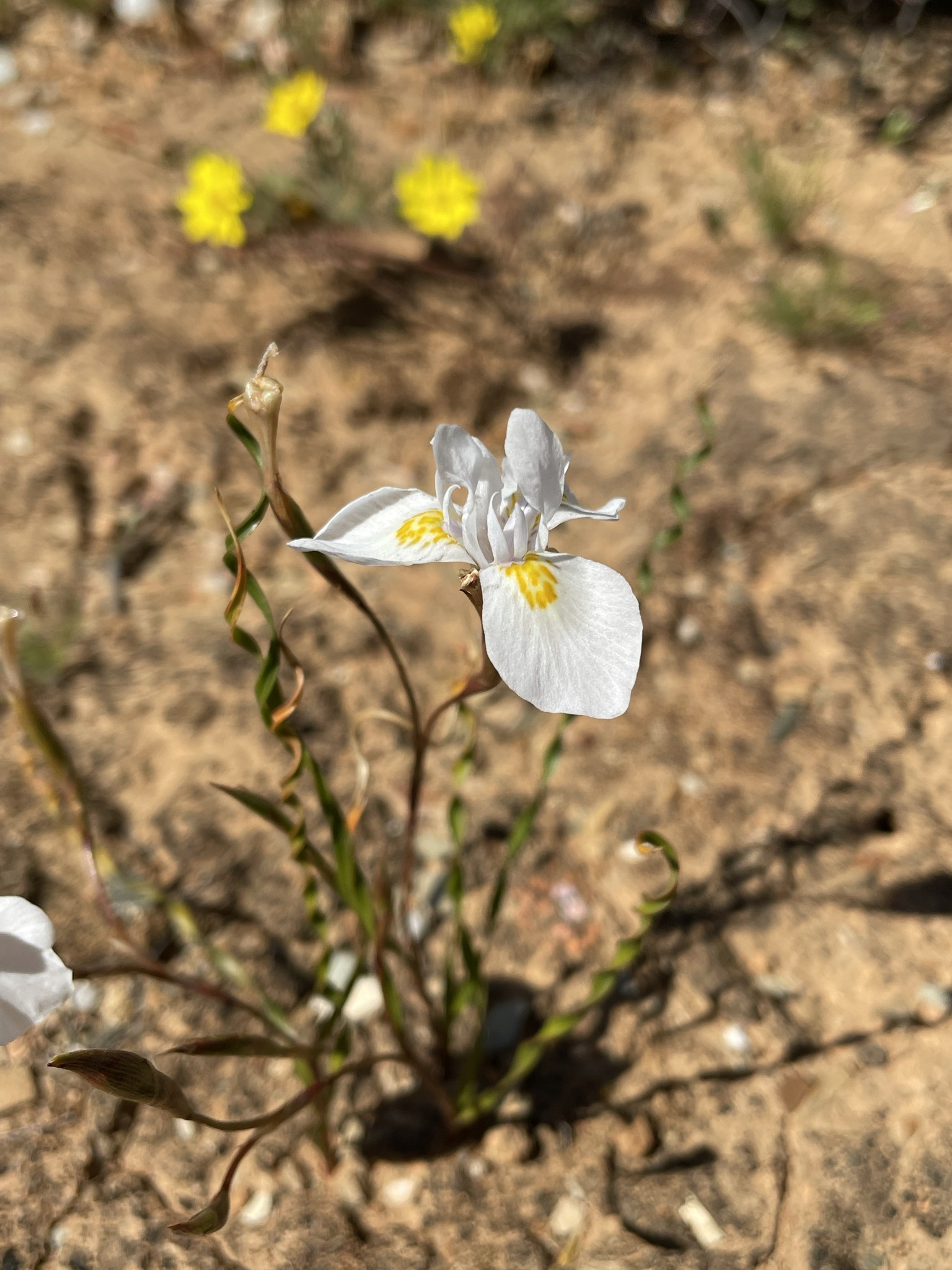

Conservation status
- Least Concern (SANBI Red List)

Scientific classification
- Kingdom: Plantae
- Clade: Embryophytes
- Clade: Tracheophytes
- Clade: Spermatophytes
- Clade: Angiosperms
- Clade: Monocots
- Order: Asparagales
- Family: Iridaceae
- Genus: Moraea
- Species: M. serpentina

Binomial name
- Moraea serpentina Baker

Synonyms
- Moraea arenaria Baker; Moraea framesii L.Bolus

= Moraea serpentina =

Flowering plant endemic to the Cape Provinces

Moraea serpentina is a flowering plant species in the genus Moraea. It is endemic to the Northern Cape and Western Cape of South Africa.

== Distribution ==
Moraea serpentina is found from Namaqualand to the Olifants River Valley.

== Conservation status ==
Moraea serpentina is classified as Least Concern as the population is regarded as stable.
