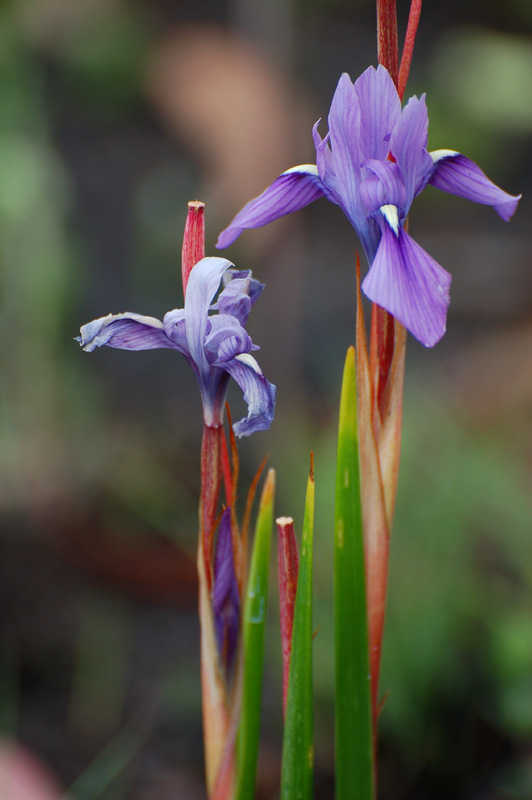

Conservation status
- Vulnerable (IUCN 3.1)

Scientific classification
- Kingdom: Plantae
- Clade: Tracheophytes
- Clade: Angiosperms
- Clade: Monocots
- Order: Asparagales
- Family: Iridaceae
- Genus: Moraea
- Species: M. callista

Binomial name
- Moraea callista Goldblatt

= Moraea callista =

Species of flowering plant

Moraea callista, commonly known as the fringe tulp or growweuintjie, is a plant and geophyte belonging to the genus Moraea. The species is endemic to Tanzania.
