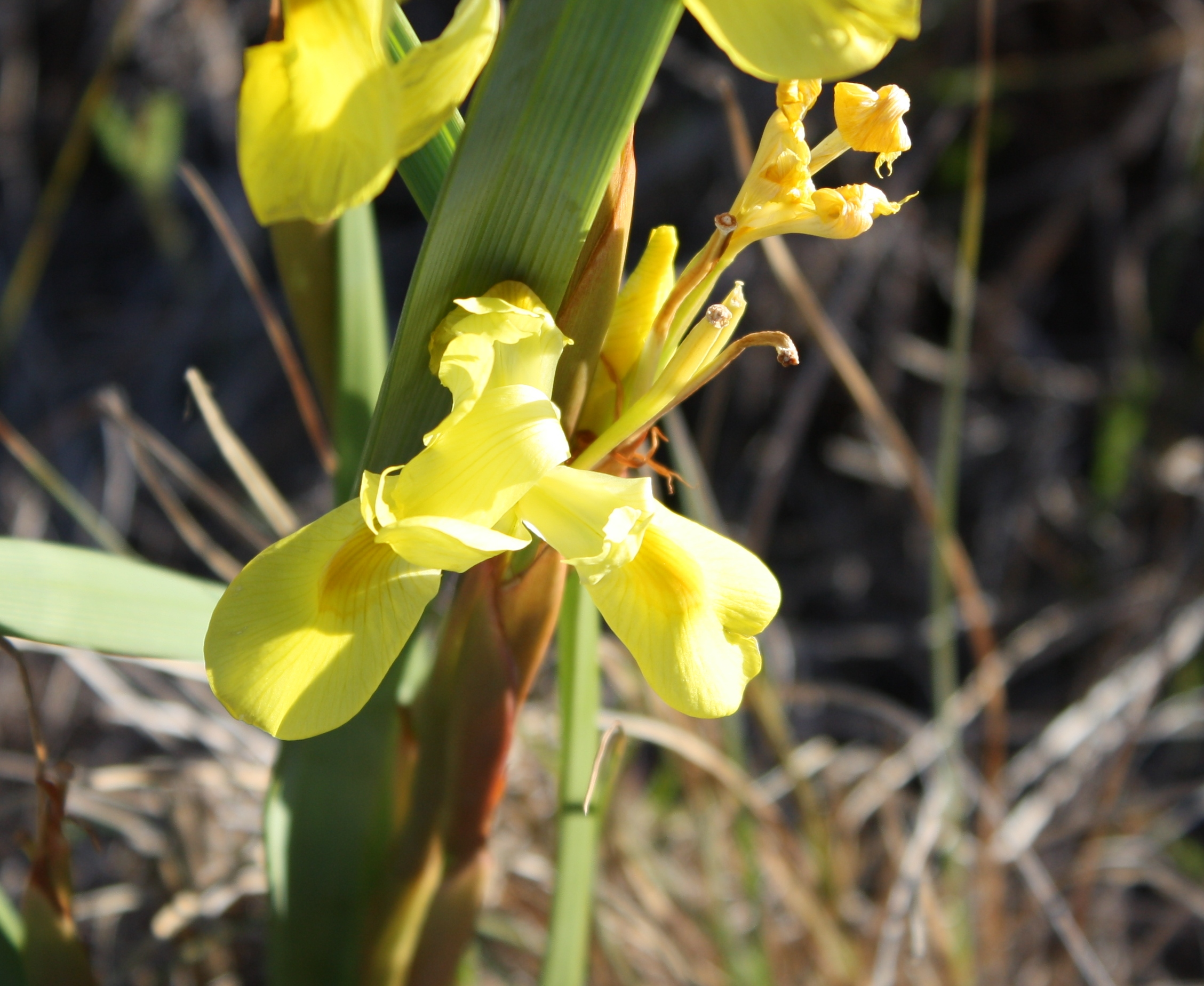

Scientific classification
- Kingdom: Plantae
- Clade: Tracheophytes
- Clade: Angiosperms
- Clade: Monocots
- Order: Asparagales
- Family: Iridaceae
- Genus: Moraea
- Species: M. spathulata

Binomial name
- Moraea spathulata (L.f.) Klatt

= Moraea spathulata =

Species of flowering plant

Moraea spathulata is a plant species in the family Iridaceae.
