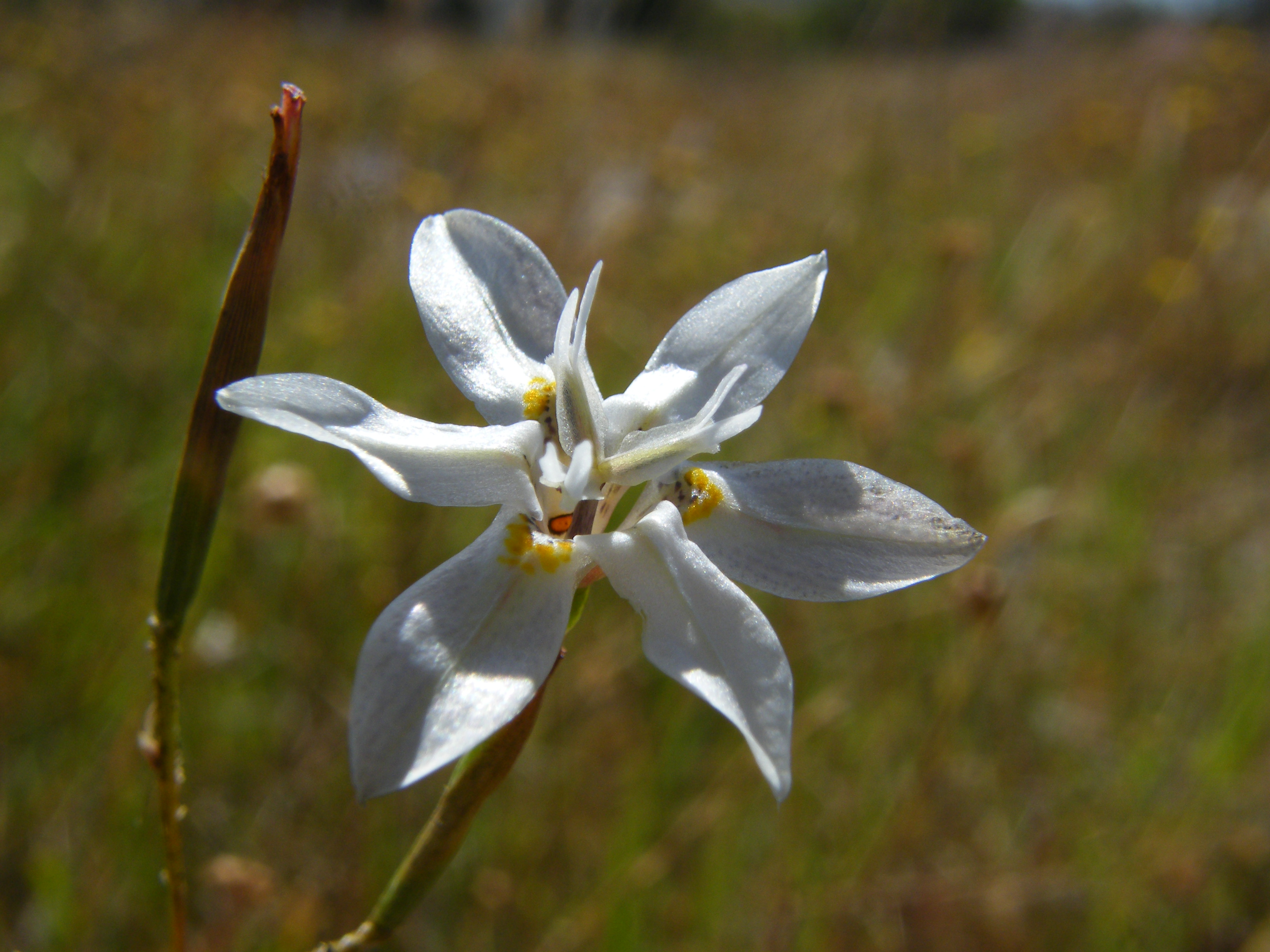

Scientific classification
- Kingdom: Plantae
- Clade: Tracheophytes
- Clade: Angiosperms
- Clade: Monocots
- Order: Asparagales
- Family: Iridaceae
- Genus: Moraea
- Species: M. viscaria

Binomial name
- Moraea viscaria Ker Gawl.

= Moraea viscaria =

Species of flowering plant

Moraea viscaria is the type species of the genus of Moraea in the family Iridaceae that is named after the sticky secretion on the stem and branches.

It is a cormous geophyte 20 – 45 cm in height with white flowers. The outer tepals are 15 – 23 mm long and inner tepals 14 – 20 mm long. The flower is sweetly scented and pollen bright red. The stem is branched and sticky, dry at flowering. It flowers from October to December.

Its habitat is reported as sandy or stony flats in the Western Cape between Saldanha in the west and Cape Agulhas in the east.
