= Moraea longifolia =

Scientific classification
- Kingdom: Plantae
- Clade: Tracheophytes
- Clade: Angiosperms
- Clade: Monocots
- Order: Asparagales
- Family: Iridaceae
- Genus: Moraea
- Species: M. longifolia

Binomial name
- Moraea longifolia (Jacq.) Pers.

Synonyms
- Hexaglottis flexuosa (L.f.) Sweet; Hexaglottis longifolia (Jacq.) Salisb.; Hexaglottis longifolia var. angustifolia G.J.Lewis; Homeria flexuosa (L.f.) Sweet; Ixia longifolia Jacq.; Moraea flexuosa L.f.; Sisyrinchium flexuosum (L.f.) Spreng.

Species of flowering plant

Moraea longifolia, commonly known as the long threadstar, is a plant and geophyte belonging to the genus Moraea and is part of the fynbos. The species is endemic to the Northern Cape, Eastern Cape and Western Cape.
