= Moraea stricta =

Scientific classification
- Kingdom: Plantae
- Clade: Tracheophytes
- Clade: Angiosperms
- Clade: Monocots
- Order: Asparagales
- Family: Iridaceae
- Genus: Moraea
- Species: M. stricta

Binomial name
- Moraea stricta Baker

Synonyms
- Moraea curtisiae R.C.Foster; Moraea mossii N.E.Br.; Moraea parva N.E.Br.; Moraea tellinii Chiov.; Moraea trita N.E.Br.; Moraea trita var. foliata N.E.Br.

Species of flowering plant

Moraea stricta, commonly known as bloutulp, is a plant and geophyte belonging to the genus Moraea. In South Africa, the species is native to Gauteng, KwaZulu-Natal, Limpopo, Mpumalanga and the Free State. Outside South Africa, it is native to Eswatini, Ethiopia, Kenya, Lesotho, Malawi, Mozambique, Tanzania, Uganda, Zambia and Zimbabwe.
