= Moraea bulbillifera =

Scientific classification
- Kingdom: Plantae
- Clade: Tracheophytes
- Clade: Angiosperms
- Clade: Monocots
- Order: Asparagales
- Family: Iridaceae
- Genus: Moraea
- Species: M. bulbillifera

Binomial name
- Moraea bulbillifera (G.J.Lewis) Goldblatt

Synonyms
- Homeria bulbillifera G.J.Lewis; Homeria bulbillifera subsp. anomala Goldblatt; Moraea bulbillifera subsp. anomala (Goldblatt) Goldblatt

Species of flowering plant

Moraea bulbillifera, commonly known as the bulblet capetulp, is a plant and geophyte belonging to the genus Moraea and is part of the fynbos. The species is endemic to the Eastern Cape and the Western Cape.

The plant has two subspecies:

- Moraea bulbillifera subsp. anomala (G.J.Lewis) Goldblatt
- Moraea bulbillifera subsp. bulbillifera (G.J.Lewis) Goldblatt
