= Moraea alticola =

Scientific classification
- Kingdom: Plantae
- Clade: Tracheophytes
- Clade: Angiosperms
- Clade: Monocots
- Order: Asparagales
- Family: Iridaceae
- Genus: Moraea
- Species: M. alticola

Binomial name
- Moraea alticola Goldblatt

Species of plant

Moraea alticola is a species of flowering plant in the family Iridaceae. It is native to the Drakensbergs of South Africa and Lesotho. A cormous perennial, it may be available from commercial suppliers.
