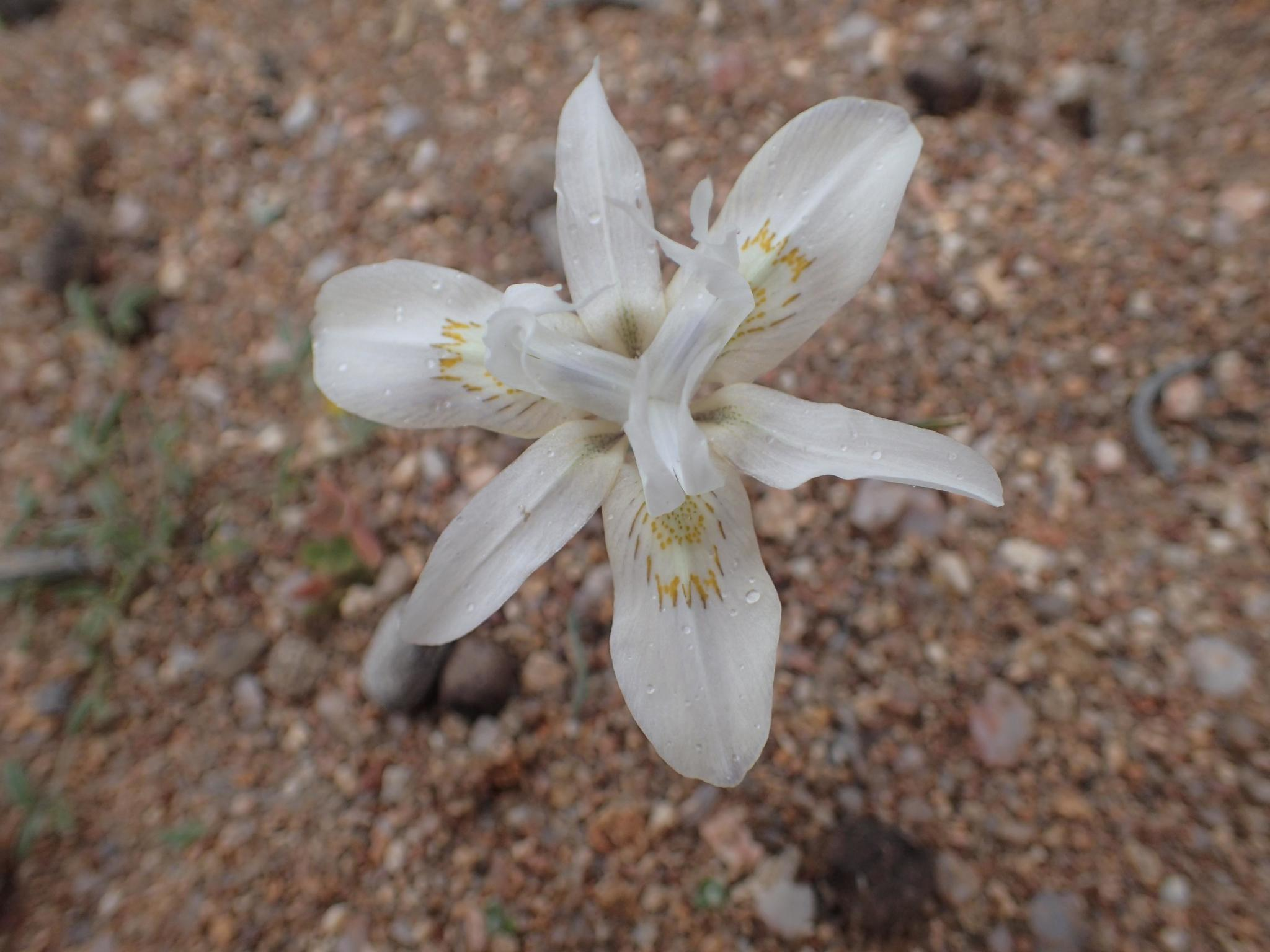

Scientific classification
- Kingdom: Plantae
- Clade: Tracheophytes
- Clade: Angiosperms
- Clade: Monocots
- Order: Asparagales
- Family: Iridaceae
- Genus: Moraea
- Species: M. filicaulis

Binomial name
- Moraea filicaulis Baker

Synonyms
- Moraea diphylla; Moraea fugax subsp. filicaulis (Baker) Goldblatt

= Moraea filicaulis =

Species of flowering plant

Moraea filicaulis is a flowering plant in the iris family, Iridaceae. It is endemic to South Africa where it occurs in Namaqualand, Knersvlakte, Olifants River Valley, and the West Coast. Moraea filicaulis is considered a species of least concern as it is widespread and common. It has previously been considered a subspecies of Moraea fugax.
