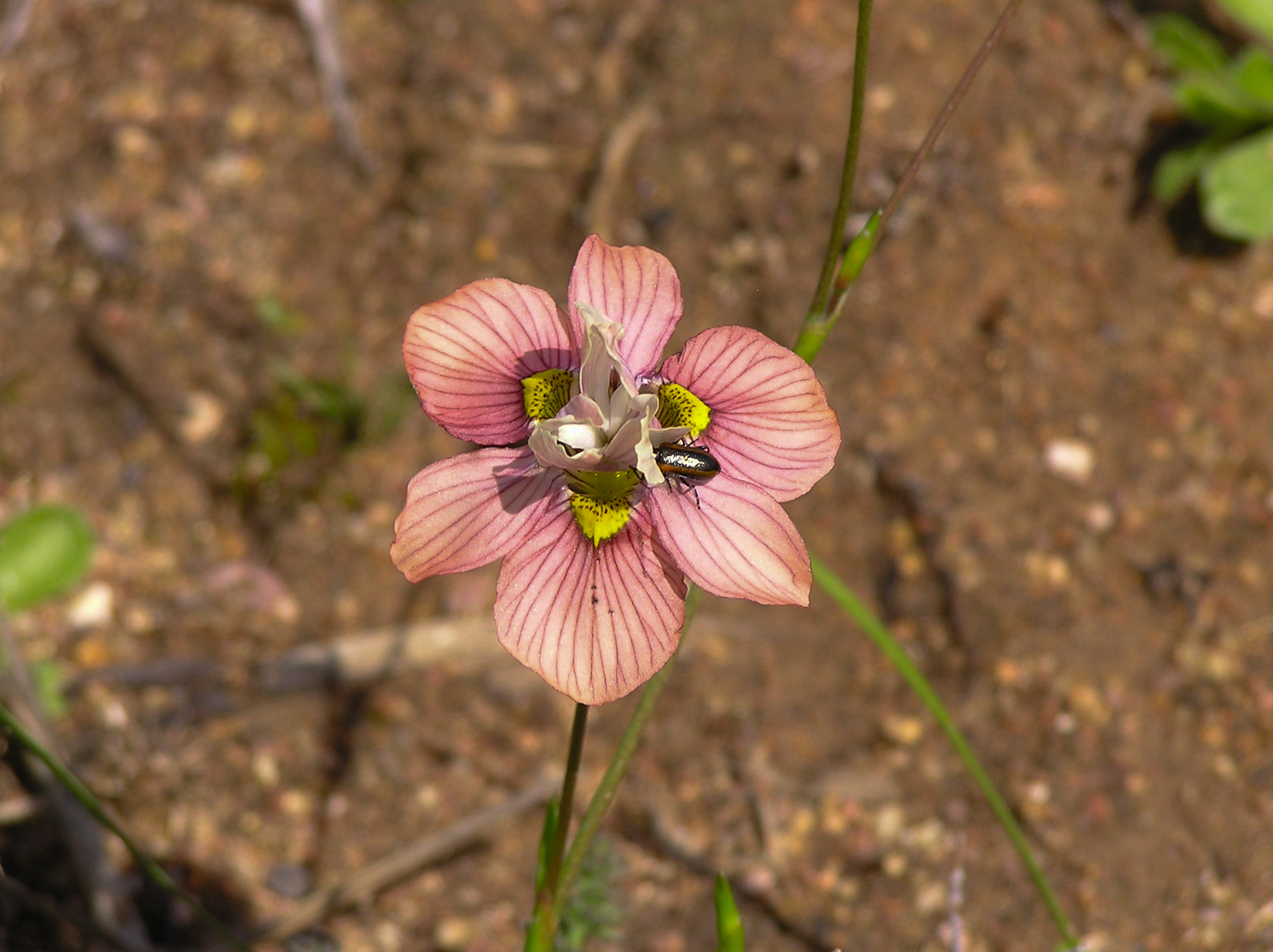

Scientific classification
- Kingdom: Plantae
- Clade: Tracheophytes
- Clade: Angiosperms
- Clade: Monocots
- Order: Asparagales
- Family: Iridaceae
- Genus: Moraea
- Species: M. tricolor

Binomial name
- Moraea tricolor Andrews 1800

= Moraea tricolor =

Species of flowering plant

Moraea tricolor is a species of plant in the family Iridaceae. It is found in Western Cape, South Africa.
