= Moraea vuvuzela =

Scientific classification
- Kingdom: Plantae
- Clade: Tracheophytes
- Clade: Angiosperms
- Clade: Monocots
- Order: Asparagales
- Family: Iridaceae
- Genus: Moraea
- Species: M. vuvuzela

Binomial name
- Moraea vuvuzela Goldblatt & J.C.Manning

Species of flowering plant

Moraea vuvuzela is a species of flowering plant in the family Iridaceae. It is named after the noisy trumpet, vuvuzela.
