= Moraea fragrans =

Scientific classification
- Kingdom: Plantae
- Clade: Tracheophytes
- Clade: Angiosperms
- Clade: Monocots
- Order: Asparagales
- Family: Iridaceae
- Genus: Moraea
- Species: M. fragrans

Binomial name
- Moraea fragrans Goldblatt

Synonyms
- Homeria odorata L.Bolus

Species of flowering plant

Moraea fragrans, commonly known as the fragrant capetulip, is a plant and geophyte belonging to the genus Moraea. The species is endemic to the Northern Cape and occurs in the Bokkeveld Plateau and Tankwa Karoo. It has a range of less than 80 km^{2} and there are seven subpopulations. The plant is considered rare.
