= Moraea longiaristata =

Scientific classification
- Kingdom: Plantae
- Clade: Tracheophytes
- Clade: Angiosperms
- Clade: Monocots
- Order: Asparagales
- Family: Iridaceae
- Genus: Moraea
- Species: M. longiaristata

Binomial name
- Moraea longiaristata Goldblatt

Species of flowering plant

Moraea longiaristata is a plant and geophyte belonging to the genus Moraea and is part of the fynbos and renosterveld. The species is endemic to the Western Cape. It occurs at Caledon in the Swartberg Mountains. There is one population consisting of only 80 plants and it is threatened by invasive plants.
