= Moraea pallida =

- Close-up of flower
- Habit

Scientific classification
- Kingdom: Plantae
- Clade: Tracheophytes
- Clade: Angiosperms
- Clade: Monocots
- Order: Asparagales
- Family: Iridaceae
- Genus: Moraea
- Species: M. pallida

Binomial name
- Moraea pallida (Baker) Goldblatt

Synonyms
- List: Homeria glauca (J.M.Wood & M.S.Evans) N.E.Br.; Homeria humilis N.E.Br.; Homeria mossii N.E.Br.; Homeria pallida Baker; Homeria pura N.E.Br.; Homeria townsendiae N.E.Br.; Moraea glauca J.M.Wood & M.S.Evans

Species of plant

Moraea pallida, the yellow tulp, is a species of flowering plant in the family Iridaceae. It is native to southern Africa. A cormous perennial, it is known for being toxic to livestock.
