= Moraea bipartita =

Scientific classification
- Kingdom: Plantae
- Clade: Tracheophytes
- Clade: Angiosperms
- Clade: Monocots
- Order: Asparagales
- Family: Iridaceae
- Genus: Moraea
- Species: M. bipartita

Binomial name
- Moraea bipartita L.Bolus

Synonyms
- Moraea polyanthos Thunb.

Species of flowering plant

Moraea bipartita, commonly called the blue tulip, cape tulip or cape blue tulip, is a plant and geophyte belonging to the genus Moraea and is part of the fynbos and Succulent Karoo. The species is endemic to the Eastern Cape and the Western Cape and occurs from Ladismith to the Eastern Cape and the southern Karoo. The population is stable.
