= Moraea amissa =

Scientific classification
- Kingdom: Plantae
- Clade: Tracheophytes
- Clade: Angiosperms
- Clade: Monocots
- Order: Asparagales
- Family: Iridaceae
- Genus: Moraea
- Species: M. amissa

Binomial name
- Moraea amissa Goldblatt

Species of flowering plant

Moraea amissa, commonly known as the lost flappie, is a plant and geophyte belonging to the genus Moraea and is part of the fynbos and renosterveld. The species is endemic to the Western Cape and occurs at Malmesbury. The population is fragmented and has an area of occurrence of 18-39 km². Crop cultivation and quarrying have destroyed large parts of the habitat. The total population is estimated to be between 200 - 400 plants.
