= Moraea worcesterensis =

Scientific classification
- Kingdom: Plantae
- Clade: Tracheophytes
- Clade: Angiosperms
- Clade: Monocots
- Order: Asparagales
- Family: Iridaceae
- Genus: Moraea
- Species: M. worcesterensis

Binomial name
- Moraea worcesterensis Goldblatt

Species of flowering plant

Moraea worcesterensis, commonly known as the Worcester uintjie, is a plant and geophyte belonging to the genus Moraea and is part of the fynbos. The species is endemic to the Western Cape and occurs at Worcester. In the original area where the plant was discovered, it is extinct due to development. However, three other subpopulations have been discovered around Worcester but they are threatened by the establishment of vineyards, further development and invasive plants.
