= Moraea cedarmonticola =

Scientific classification
- Kingdom: Plantae
- Clade: Tracheophytes
- Clade: Angiosperms
- Clade: Monocots
- Order: Asparagales
- Family: Iridaceae
- Genus: Moraea
- Species: M. cedarmonticola

Binomial name
- Moraea cedarmonticola Goldblatt

Synonyms
- Homeria cedarmontana Goldblatt

Species of flowering plant

Moraea cedarmonticola, commonly known as the Cederberg tulip, is a plant and geophyte belonging to the genus Moraea and is part of the fynbos. The species is endemic to the Western Cape and occurs in the Cederberg mountains, where it has an extent of occurrence of 150 km^{2}.
