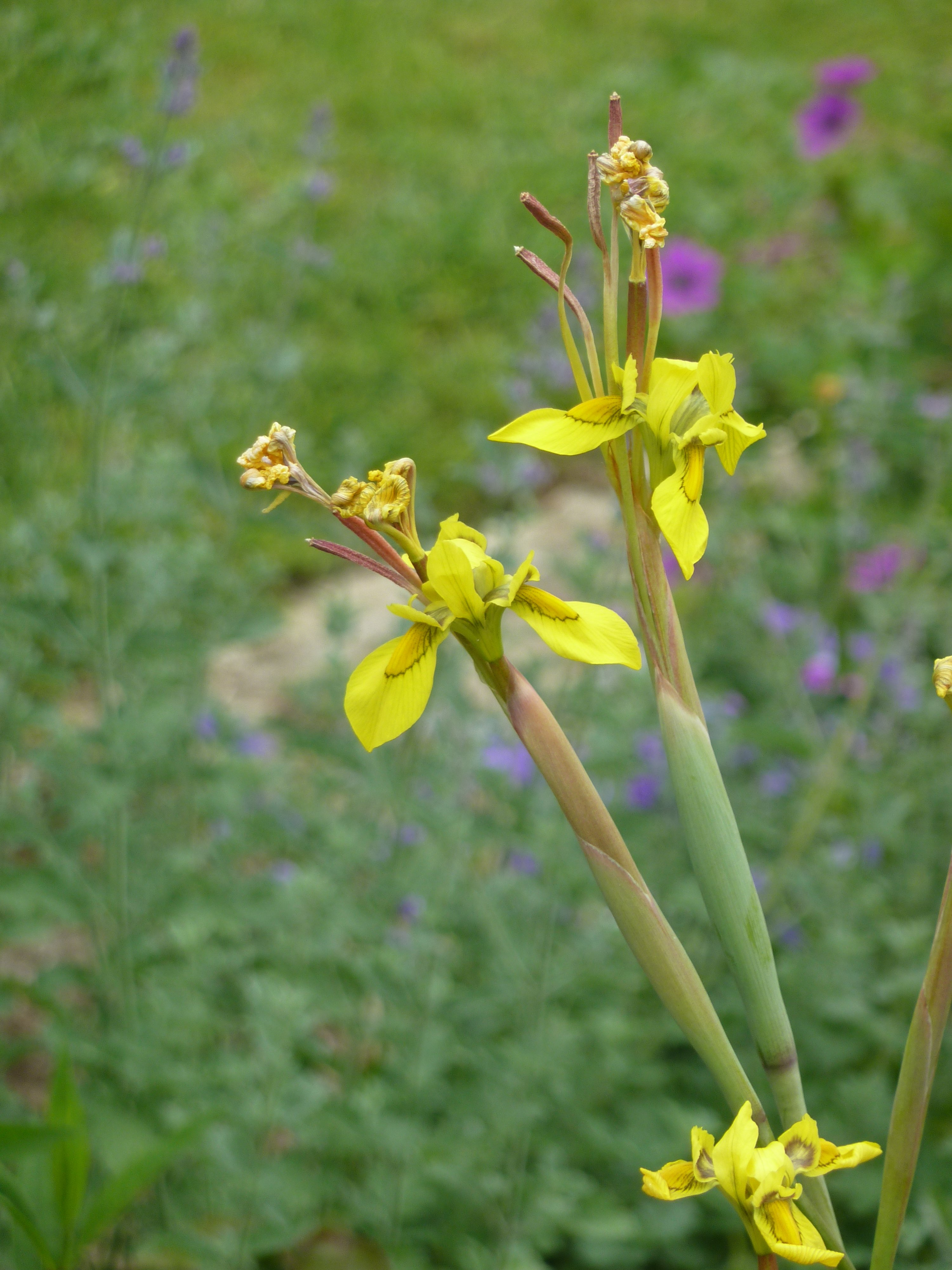
- Flowers
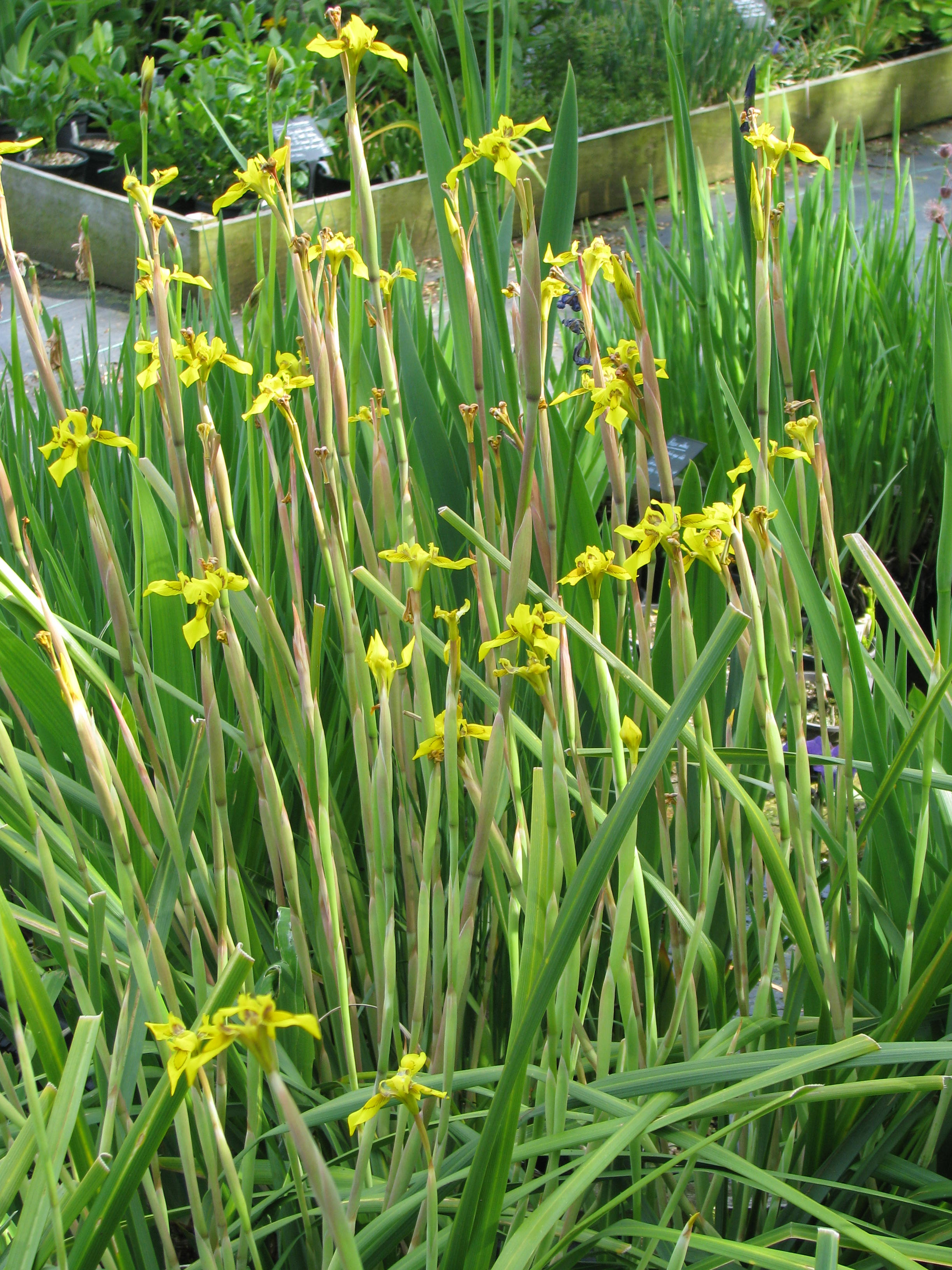
- In a garden setting

Conservation status
- Least Concern (IUCN 3.1)

Scientific classification
- Kingdom: Plantae
- Clade: Tracheophytes
- Clade: Angiosperms
- Clade: Monocots
- Order: Asparagales
- Family: Iridaceae
- Genus: Moraea
- Species: M. huttonii

Binomial name
- Moraea huttonii (Baker) Oberm.

Synonyms
- Dietes huttonii Baker; Moraea baurii Baker; Moraea rivularis Schltr.

= Moraea huttonii =

Species of plant

Moraea huttonii, called Hutton's Cape tulip, peacock iris (a name it shares with other members of its genus), and large golden vlei moraea, is a widespread species of flowering plant in the family Iridaceae. It is native to South Africa and Lesotho, from southern Mpumalanga to the eastern Cape Provinces. An erect cormous perennial reaching 1 m (3 ft), it is typically found in wetlands. It has been assessed as Least Concern. Hardy down to USDA Zone 3, seeds are readily available from commercial suppliers.
