= Moraea brevistyla =

Scientific classification
- Kingdom: Plantae
- Clade: Tracheophytes
- Clade: Angiosperms
- Clade: Monocots
- Order: Asparagales
- Family: Iridaceae
- Genus: Moraea
- Species: M. brevistyla

Binomial name
- Moraea brevistyla (Goldblatt) Goldblatt

Synonyms
- Moraea pubiflora subsp. brevistyla Goldblatt

Species of flowering plant

Moraea brevistyla, commonly known as the shortstyle uintjie or short-styled moraea, is a plant and geophyte belonging to the genus Moraea. The species is native to Lesotho, Mpumalanga, and the Free State.
