= Moraea umbellata =

Scientific classification
- Kingdom: Plantae
- Clade: Tracheophytes
- Clade: Angiosperms
- Clade: Monocots
- Order: Asparagales
- Family: Iridaceae
- Genus: Moraea
- Species: M. umbellata

Binomial name
- Moraea umbellata Thunb.

Synonyms
- Bobartia umbellata (Thunb.) Ker Gawl.; Homeria bobartioides L.Bolus; Homeria umbellata (Thunb.) G.J.Lewis; Moraea edulis var. umbellata ((Thunb.) Baker; Rheome umbellata (Thunb.) Goldblatt

Species of flowering plant

Moraea umbellata is a plant and geophyte that belongs to the genus Moraea and is part of the fynbos. The species is endemic to the Western Cape.
