= Moraea elegans =

Scientific classification
- Kingdom: Plantae
- Clade: Tracheophytes
- Clade: Angiosperms
- Clade: Monocots
- Order: Asparagales
- Family: Iridaceae
- Genus: Moraea
- Species: M. elegans

Binomial name
- Moraea elegans Jacq.

Synonyms
- Homeria elegans (Jacq.) Sweet; Homeria metelerkanpiae L.Bolus; Homeria spicata (Ker Gawl.) Sweet; Moraea spicata Ker Gawl.; Sisyrinchium elegans (Jacq.) Willd.

Species of flowering plant

Moraea elegans, commonly known in Afrikaans as the poutulp, is a plant and geophyte belonging to the genus Moraea that forms part of the fynbos and renosterveld vegetation. The species is endemic to the Western Cape and occurs from Stellenbosch to Bredasdorp. It has an extent of occurrence of less than 600 km^{2}. The plant has already lost 60–80% of its habitat to crop cultivation, and the remaining subpopulations are fragmented. Crop cultivation and invasive plants continue to pose a threat.
