= Moraea neglecta =

Scientific classification
- Kingdom: Plantae
- Clade: Tracheophytes
- Clade: Angiosperms
- Clade: Monocots
- Order: Asparagales
- Family: Iridaceae
- Genus: Moraea
- Species: M. neglecta

Binomial name
- Moraea neglecta G.J.Lewis

Species of flowering plant

Moraea neglecta, commonly known as the yellow iris, rush-leaved iris, or gloaming tulip, is a plant and geophyte belonging to the genus Moraea and is part of the fynbos. The species is endemic to the Northern Cape and Western Cape, occurring from the Bokkeveld Mountains to the Agulhas coast. The plant grows to a height of 20–50 cm and blooms from September to November; the flowers are yellow.
