= Moraea cookii =

Scientific classification
- Kingdom: Plantae
- Clade: Tracheophytes
- Clade: Angiosperms
- Clade: Monocots
- Order: Asparagales
- Family: Iridaceae
- Genus: Moraea
- Species: M. cookii

Binomial name
- Moraea cookii (L.Bolus) Goldblatt

Synonyms
- Homeria cookii L.Bolus; Homeria pillansii L.Bolus

Species of flowering plant

Moraea cookii, commonly known as Cook's moraea, is a plant and geophyte belonging to the genus Moraea and is part of the renosterveld. The species is native to Lesotho, the Northern Cape, the Eastern Cape and the Western Cape. The population is stable.
