= Moraea tripetala =

- Pale blue morph
- Purple morph

Scientific classification
- Kingdom: Plantae
- Clade: Tracheophytes
- Clade: Angiosperms
- Clade: Monocots
- Order: Asparagales
- Family: Iridaceae
- Genus: Moraea
- Species: M. tripetala

Binomial name
- Moraea tripetala (L.f.) Ker Gawl.

Synonyms
- List: Iris mutila Licht. ex Roem. & Schult.; Iris tripetala L.f.; Moraea tripetala var. jacquiniana Schltr. ex G.J.Lewis; Moraea tripetala var. mutila (Licht. ex Roem. & Schult.) Baker; Vieusseuxia mutila (Licht. ex Roem. & Schult.) A.Dietr.; Vieusseuxia pulchra Eckl.; Vieusseuxia tripetala (L.f.) Voigt; Vieusseuxia tripetaloides DC.

Species of plant

Moraea tripetala, the blue tulp, is a widespread species of flowering plant in the family Iridaceae. It is native to the southwestern and south-southwestern Cape Provinces of South Africa. A cormous perennial 10 to 50 cm (4 to 20 in) tall, it is the namesake of a "hypervariable" species complex.

== Subtaxa ==
The following subspecies are accepted:

- Moraea tripetala subsp. jacquiniana (Schltr. ex G.J.Lewis) Goldblatt & J.C.Manning – late-flowering
- Moraea tripetala subsp. tripetala – tepals pale blue, deep blue or purple with white (rarely yellow) nectar guides
- Moraea tripetala subsp. violacea Goldblatt & J.C.Manning – tepals violet with yellow nectar guides
