= Moraea algoensis =

Scientific classification
- Kingdom: Plantae
- Clade: Tracheophytes
- Clade: Angiosperms
- Clade: Monocots
- Order: Asparagales
- Family: Iridaceae
- Genus: Moraea
- Species: M. algoensis

Binomial name
- Moraea algoensis Goldblatt

Species of flowering plant

Moraea algoensis, commonly known as the Algoa clockflower, is a plant and geophyte belonging to the genus Moraea and is part of the fynbos. The species is endemic to the Eastern Cape and Western Cape, occurring from Worcester to Port Elizabeth. The population is stable.
