= Moraea hiemalis =

Scientific classification
- Kingdom: Plantae
- Clade: Tracheophytes
- Clade: Angiosperms
- Clade: Monocots
- Order: Asparagales
- Family: Iridaceae
- Genus: Moraea
- Species: M. hiemalis

Binomial name
- Moraea hiemalis Goldblatt

Species of flowering plant

Moraea hiemalis, commonly known as the winter moraea or winter flag, is a plant and geophyte belonging to the genus Moraea. The species is endemic to KwaZulu-Natal and occurs in the KwaZulu-Natal Midlands between Pietermaritzburg, Richmond and Kamberg in the grasslands. It has a range of 4 996 km² and has lost more than 50% of its habitat to plantations and agricultural activities. Development in both the formal and informal sectors at Pietermaritzburg continues to be a threat. The veld is also subject to excessive burning and invasive species are also a threat.
