= Moraea patens =

Scientific classification
- Kingdom: Plantae
- Clade: Tracheophytes
- Clade: Angiosperms
- Clade: Monocots
- Order: Asparagales
- Family: Iridaceae
- Genus: Moraea
- Species: M. patens

Binomial name
- Moraea patens (Goldblatt) Goldblatt

Synonyms
- Homeria patens Goldblatt

Species of flowering plant

Moraea patens is a plant and geophyte belonging to the genus Moraea and is part of the fynbos. The species is endemic to the Western Cape and has an extent of occurrence of less than 34 km^{2}. It is found from the Nardous Mountains to the Pakhuis Mountains. The plant has already lost 50% of its habitat to crop cultivation, and the further expansion of the rooibos tea industry poses a major threat.
