= Moraea minor =

Scientific classification
- Kingdom: Plantae
- Clade: Tracheophytes
- Clade: Angiosperms
- Clade: Monocots
- Order: Asparagales
- Family: Iridaceae
- Genus: Moraea
- Species: M. minor

Binomial name
- Moraea minor Eckl.

Synonyms
- Homeria framesii L.Bolus; Homeria minor (Eckl.) Goldblatt; Homeria rhopalocarpa Schltr.; Vieusseuxia curvata Eckl.

Species of flowering plant

Moraea minor, commonly known as the kleintulp or small tulip, is a plant and geophyte belonging to the genus Moraea, and is part of the fynbos. The species is endemic to the Western Cape and occurs from the Gifberge to the Cape Peninsula.
