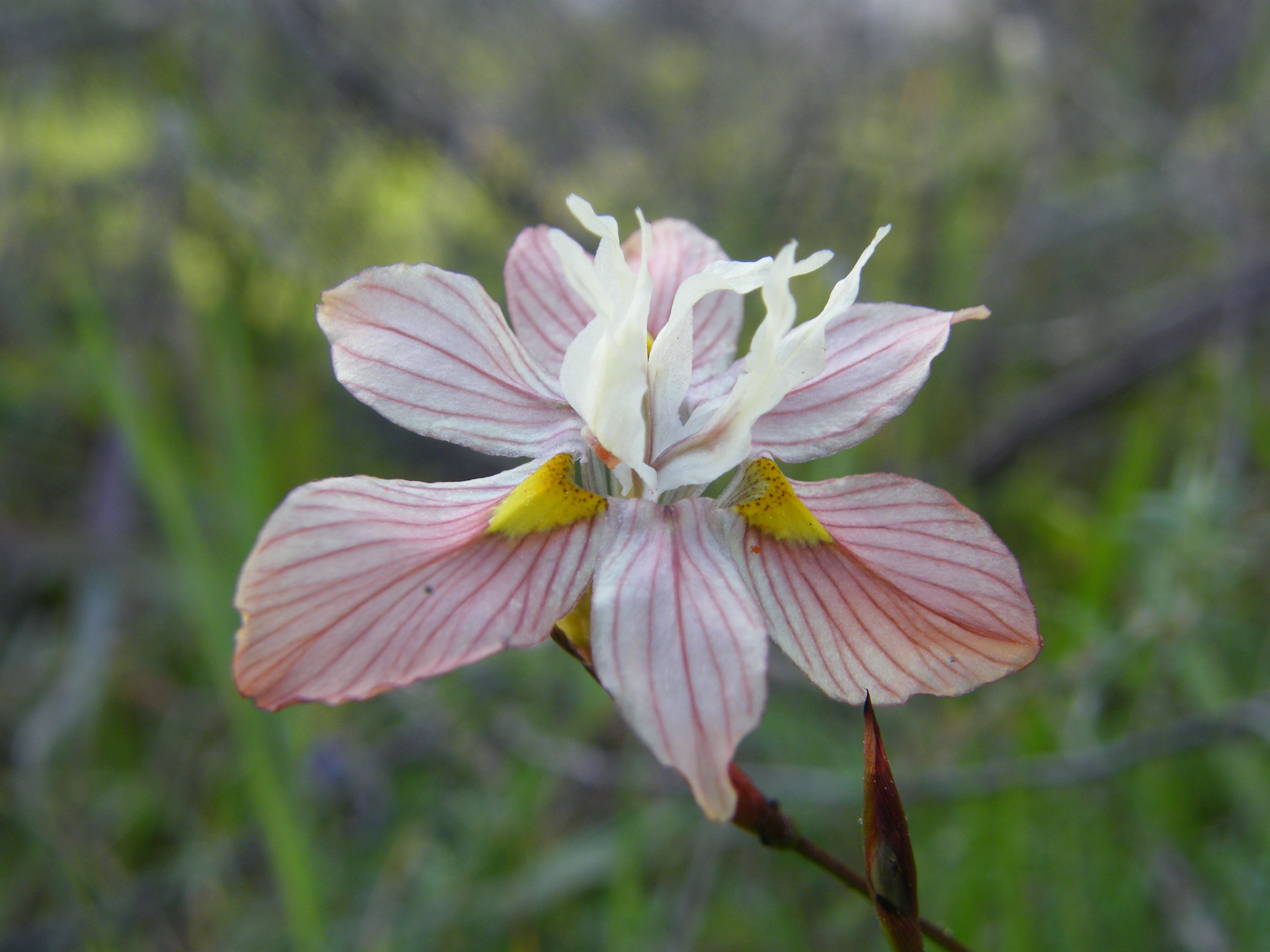

Scientific classification
- Kingdom: Plantae
- Clade: Tracheophytes
- Clade: Angiosperms
- Clade: Monocots
- Order: Asparagales
- Family: Iridaceae
- Genus: Moraea
- Species: M. gawleri

Binomial name
- Moraea gawleri Spreng. 1828

Synonyms
- Iris crispa L.f. (1782); Moraea crispa (L.f.) Ker Gawl. (1810); Moraea undulata Ker Gawl. (1827); Vieusseuxia angustifolia Eckl. (1827); Vieusseuxia brehmii Eckl. (1827); Moraea decussata Klatt (1882); Moraea crispa var. rectifolia Baker (1896); Moraea sulphurea Baker (1899)

= Moraea gawleri =

Species of flowering plant

Moraea gawleri is a species of plant in the family Iridaceae. The majority of its range lies around Western Cape province of South Africa, however it has also been recorded as far as Namaqualand to Humansdorp in the surrounding provinces.
