= Moraea unguiculata =

Scientific classification
- Kingdom: Plantae
- Clade: Tracheophytes
- Clade: Angiosperms
- Clade: Monocots
- Order: Asparagales
- Family: Iridaceae
- Genus: Moraea
- Species: M. unguiculata

Binomial name
- Moraea unguiculata Ker Gawl.

Synonyms
- Iris gracilis Licht. ex Roem. & Schult.; Iris tricuspis var. minor Jacq.; Moraea ceresiana G.J.Lewis; Moraea gracilis A.Dietr.; Moraea tenuis Ker Gawl.; Moraea violacea L.Bolus; Vieusseuxia gracilis Eckl.; Vieusseuxia tenuis (Ker Gawl.) Roem. & Schult.

Species of flowering plant

Moraea unguiculata, commonly known in Afrikaans as the wituintjie, is a plant and geophyte belonging to the genus Moraea and is part of the fynbos. The species is endemic to the Northern, Eastern and Western Cape and occurs from Namaqualand to Port Elizabeth, as well as the Karoo mountains.

== Description ==
The plant grows to a height of 20–50 cm and flowers from September to November, the flowers are white to cream-coloured, sometimes brownish.
