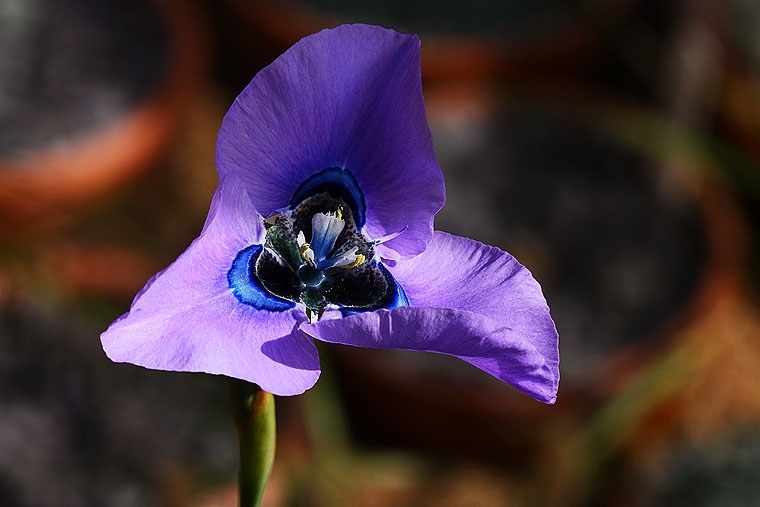

Scientific classification
- Kingdom: Plantae
- Clade: Tracheophytes
- Clade: Angiosperms
- Clade: Monocots
- Order: Asparagales
- Family: Iridaceae
- Genus: Moraea
- Species: M. gigandra

Binomial name
- Moraea gigandra L. Bolus (1927)

= Moraea gigandra =

Species of flowering plant

Moraea gigandra is a species of plant in the family Iridaceae. It is a tuberous geophyte endemic to the southwestern Cape Provinces of South Africa.
