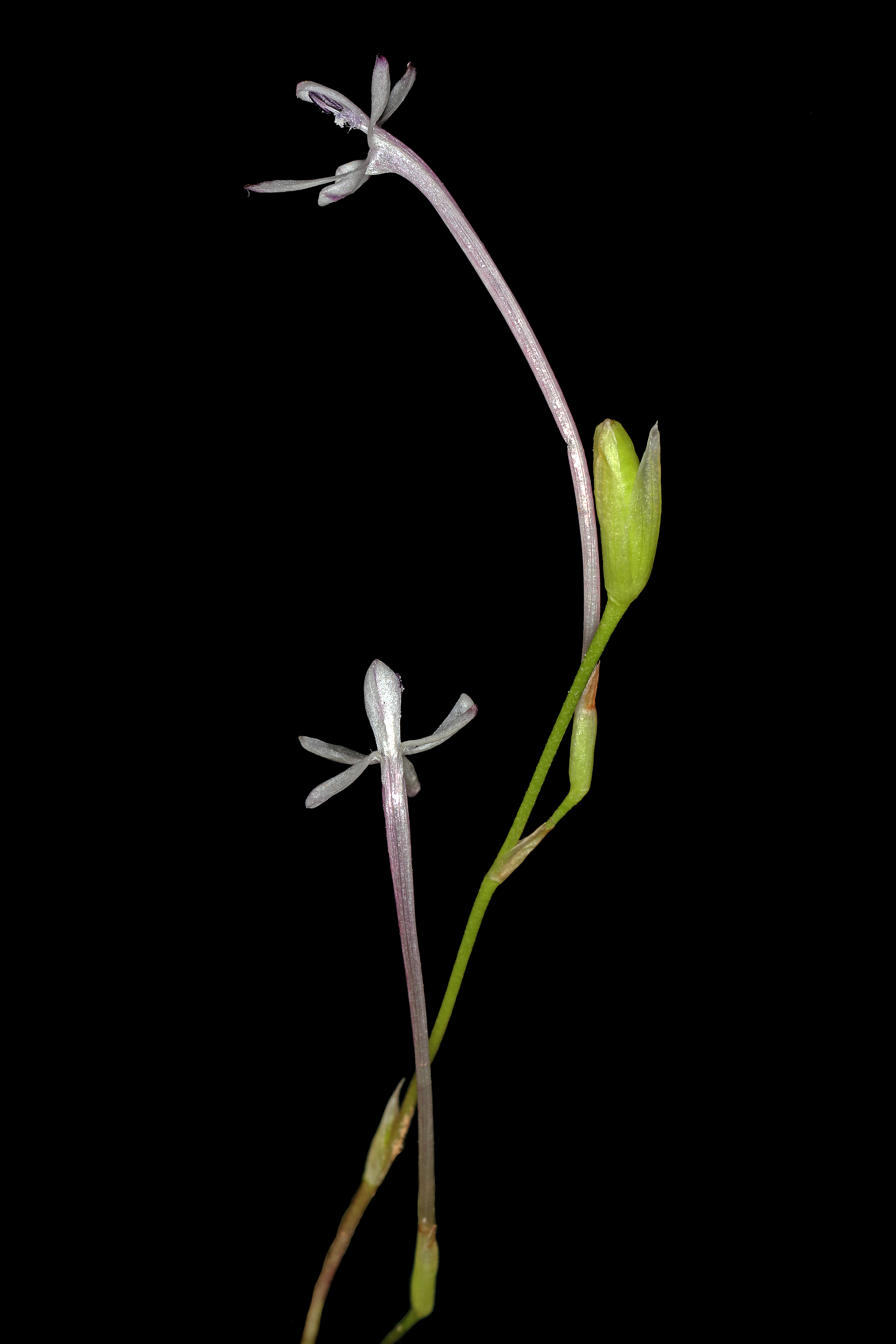

Conservation status
- Least Concern (SANBI Red List)

Scientific classification
- Kingdom: Plantae
- Clade: Tracheophytes
- Clade: Angiosperms
- Clade: Monocots
- Order: Asparagales
- Family: Iridaceae
- Genus: Xenoscapa
- Species: X. fistulosa

Binomial name
- Xenoscapa fistulosa Goldblatt & J.C.Manning, 1995

Synonyms
- Ovieda fistulosa Spreng. ex Klatt; Lapeirousia fistulosa (Spreng. ex Klatt) Baker; Anomatheca fistulosa (Spreng. ex Klatt) Goldblatt

= Xenoscapa fistulosa =

Species of plant

Xenoscapa fistulosa is a species of plant that belongs to the Iridaceae family. It is one of only three species belonging to the Xenoscapa genus, alongside Xenoscapa grandiflora and Xenoscapa uliginosa. It was classified as a least-concern species in 2005.

== Description ==
Its leaves are ovate and grow flat on the ground, while its flowers grow directly upwards. Its flowers are small and tubular, with its stem generally growing anywhere from three to twenty centimeters in length. They normally have white petals, but it is possible for them to be a pale pink color. Their fragrance is described as "spicy-sweet".

== Distribution and habitat ==
Xenoscapa fistulosa tends to grow in clay and granite-based soils, in environments that are cool, moist, and shaded. It can be found as far north as the southern tip of Namibia, and as far south as the Cape Peninsula. Its populations are clustered near South Africa's Atlantic coast.
