= Micranthus cruciatus =

Scientific classification
- Kingdom: Plantae
- Clade: Tracheophytes
- Clade: Angiosperms
- Clade: Monocots
- Order: Asparagales
- Family: Iridaceae
- Genus: Micranthus
- Species: M. cruciatus

Binomial name
- Micranthus cruciatus Goldblatt & J.C.Manning, (2013)

Species of flowering plant

Micranthus cruciatus is a species of flowering plant in the family Iridaceae. It is a perennial geophyte. The species is endemic to the Northern Cape and Western Cape and occurs in the northern Cederberg and Bokkeveld Mountains. The plant flowers in December and closely resembles Micranthus plantagineus.
