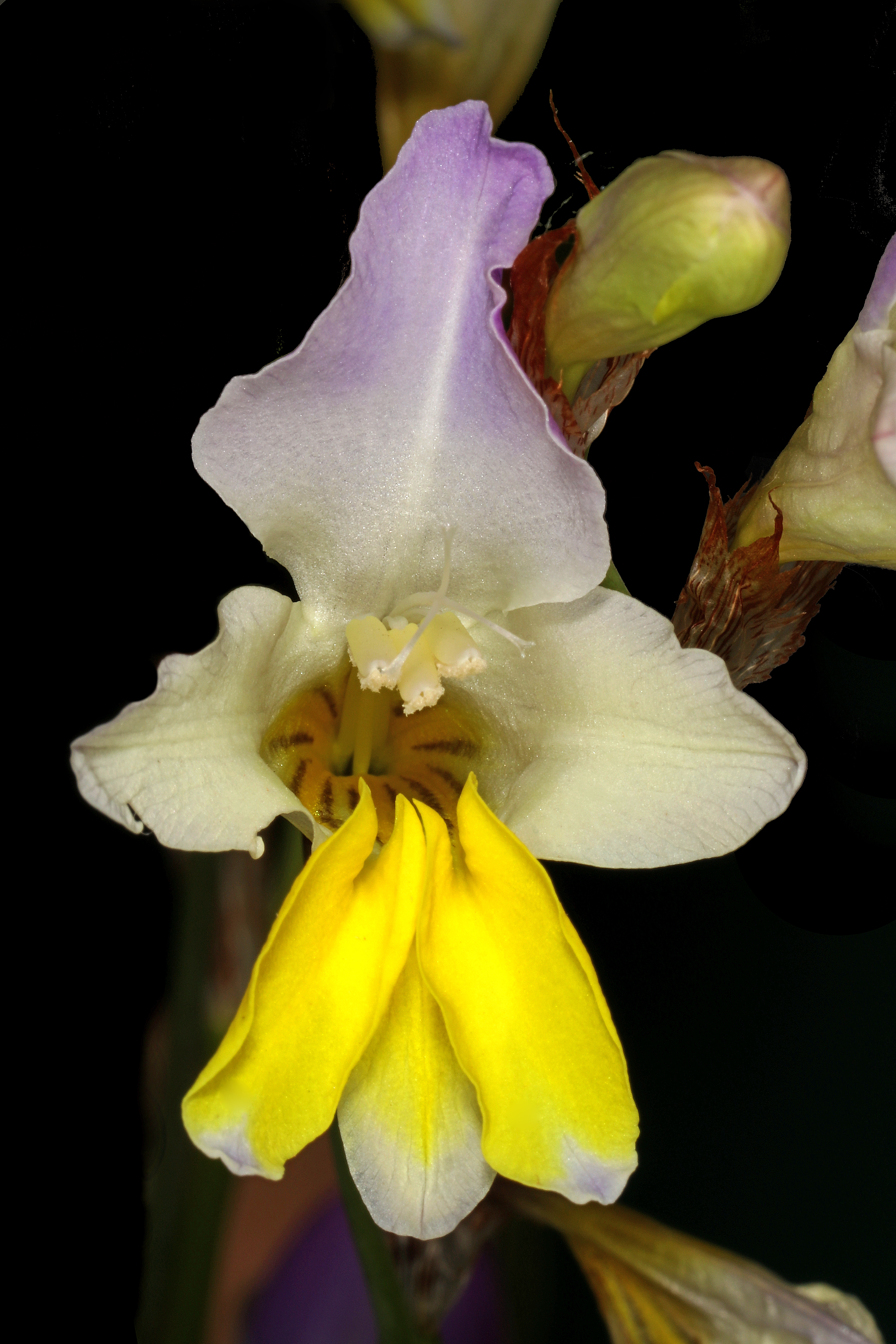

Scientific classification
- Kingdom: Plantae
- Clade: Tracheophytes
- Clade: Angiosperms
- Clade: Monocots
- Order: Asparagales
- Family: Iridaceae
- Genus: Sparaxis
- Species: S. auriculata

Binomial name
- Sparaxis auriculata Goldblatt & J.C.Manning 1999

= Sparaxis auriculata =

Species of flowering plant

Sparaxis auriculata, is a species of flowering plant in the family Iridaceae. It is found in West Cape, South Africa.
