= Micranthus simplex =

Scientific classification
- Kingdom: Plantae
- Clade: Tracheophytes
- Clade: Angiosperms
- Clade: Monocots
- Order: Asparagales
- Family: Iridaceae
- Genus: Micranthus
- Species: M. simplex

Binomial name
- Micranthus simplex Goldblatt & J.C.Manning, (2013)

Species of flowering plant

Micranthus simplex is a species of flowering plant in the family Iridaceae. It is a perennial geophyte and is part of the fynbos ecoregion. It has the smallest flowers in the genus, which are white with lilac tinge. It has linear leaves up to 1.5mm in width, with undivided branches.

The species is endemic to the Western Cape. It occurs on Zebrakop, the highest peak in the Piketberg, and grows in wet sandstone. It is considered critically rare.
