= Babiana noctiflora =

Scientific classification
- Kingdom: Plantae
- Clade: Tracheophytes
- Clade: Angiosperms
- Clade: Monocots
- Order: Asparagales
- Family: Iridaceae
- Genus: Babiana
- Species: B. noctiflora

Binomial name
- Babiana noctiflora J.C.Manning & Goldblatt

Species of flowering plant

Babiana noctiflora is a species of geophytic, perennial flowering plant in the family Iridaceae. It is part of the fynbos ecoregion. The species is endemic to the Western Cape and occurs at Paardeberg. It has an area of occurrence of less than 10 km^{2} and there are two subpopulations that total less than 250 plants. The species has lost large parts of its habitat to the establishment of vineyards and orchards.
