= Micranthus filifolius =

Scientific classification
- Kingdom: Plantae
- Clade: Tracheophytes
- Clade: Angiosperms
- Clade: Monocots
- Order: Asparagales
- Family: Iridaceae
- Genus: Micranthus
- Species: M. filifolius

Binomial name
- Micranthus filifolius Goldblatt & J.C.Manning, (2013)

Species of flowering plant

Micranthus filifolius is a species of flowering plant in the family Iridaceae. It is a perennial geophyte. The species is endemic to the Western Cape.
