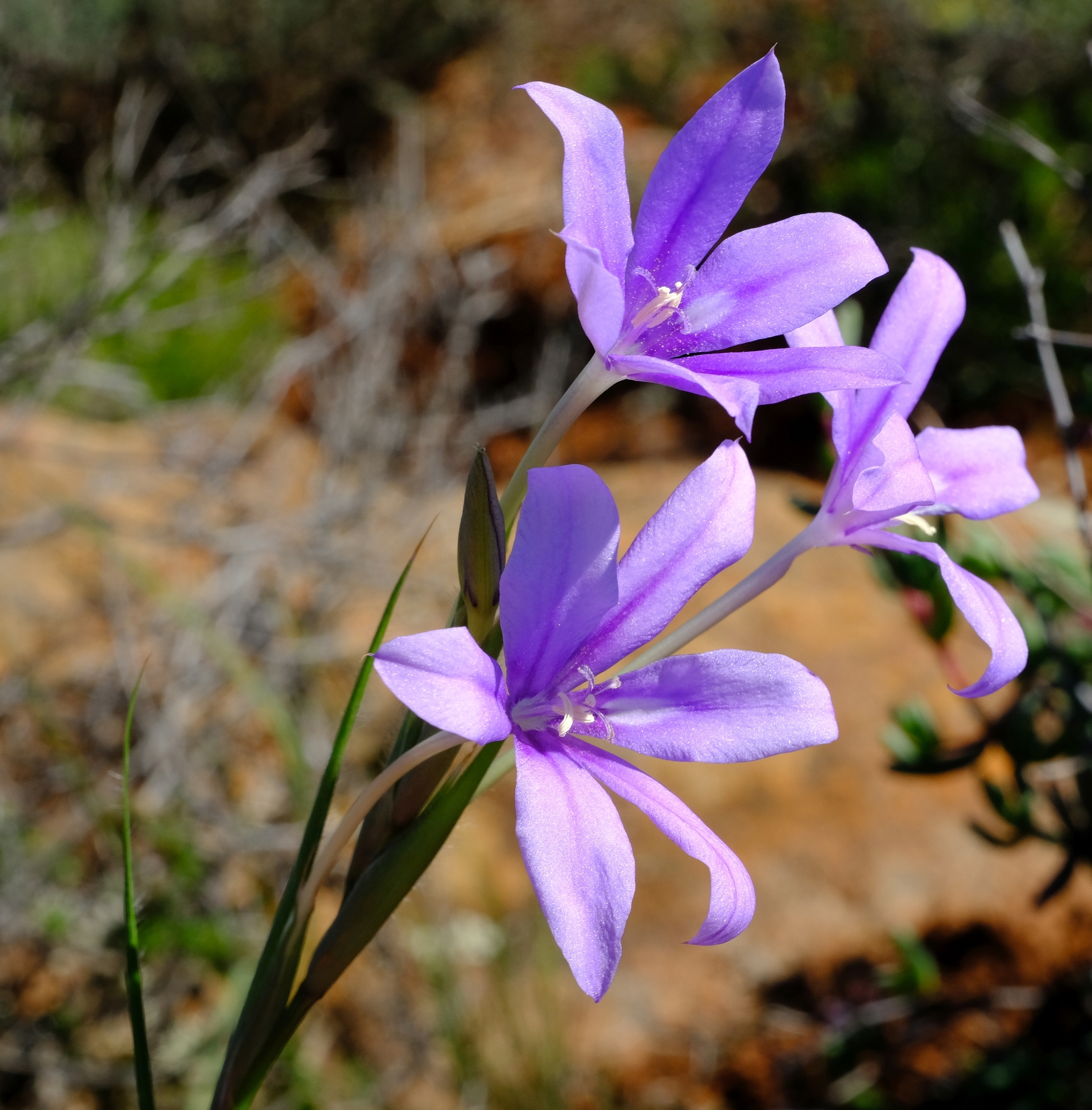

Scientific classification
- Kingdom: Plantae
- Clade: Tracheophytes
- Clade: Angiosperms
- Clade: Monocots
- Order: Asparagales
- Family: Iridaceae
- Genus: Babiana
- Species: B. symmetrantha

Binomial name
- Babiana symmetrantha Goldblatt & J.C.Manning

= Babiana symmetrantha =

Species of flowering plant

Babiana symmetrantha is a geophytic, perennial flowering plant in the family Iridaceae. The species is endemic to the Northern Cape. It occurs on the Langeberg between Kliprand and Loeriesfontein; it is part of the Hantam Karoo vegetation. There is only one population. It is called unpleated bobbejaantjie in English.

== Description ==
The unpleated bobbejaantjie is usually 10–20 cm (3.9–7.9 in) tall, exceptionally up to 30 cm, including the leaves. It grows in clusters or clumps. It survives the dry and hot summer as a round underground corm that is about 1 cm (0.39 in) wide with a fibrous covering. The stem is mostly entirely underground, but grows above the surface if it needs to push through other plants. It is wrapped in a collar of brittle, brown fibers at the base. It either has single stem or one branch, and it produces tiny cormlets from the lower axils. The laterally flattened leaves, that have a right and left surface rather than an upper and lower face, grow from the base of the plant, are long, hardly pleated, and narrow, measuring up to 20 centimeters long and about 2–5 mm (0.079–0.197 in), occasionally up to 8 mm (0.31 in) wide, longer than the flowers and carry few soft, fine hairs. Each stem is a spike of 2 to 3 flowers, each of which is subtended by two bracts that are green with dry, light-brown tips. They are about 3 centimeters long, covered in fine hairs, taper into a long point, and the inner ones have a split tip. The sweet, violet-like scented flowers are star-symmetrical, consist of six tepals that are merged at their base into a straight, thick-walled tube of about 4½-6 cm or sometimes up to 7½ cm long, that contains nectar. Higher up the tube splits into separate, lance-shaped, about 3 cm long, violet tepals with darker violet markings near the center and sometimes the lower side-petals have white marks outlined in violet. The inner petals are slightly narrower than the outer ones. The three purple filaments of about 1 cm long stand straight up in the middle of the flower and are topped by white, inwardly curved anthers that release white pollen. The ovary in the centre is smooth and topped by a purple style that grows straight up through the perianth tube and splits into branches just below the anthers. The plant flowers from mid-August to mid-September.

== Taxonomy ==
The unpleated bobbejaantjie was discovered in 2006 during an botanical expedition and named in 2008 by Peter Goldblatt and John Manning.

== Distribution, ecology and conservation ==
The unpleated bobbejaantjie grows in heavy red clay (dolerite) among boulders in the succulent Karoo near Calvinia. The long perianth tubes probably are long an adaptation to pollination by long-snouted flies. Although there is just a single population known, it is not expected to decline. In 2020 around 200 plants were observed on the flat top of the Langberg west. It is therefore considere critically rate.
