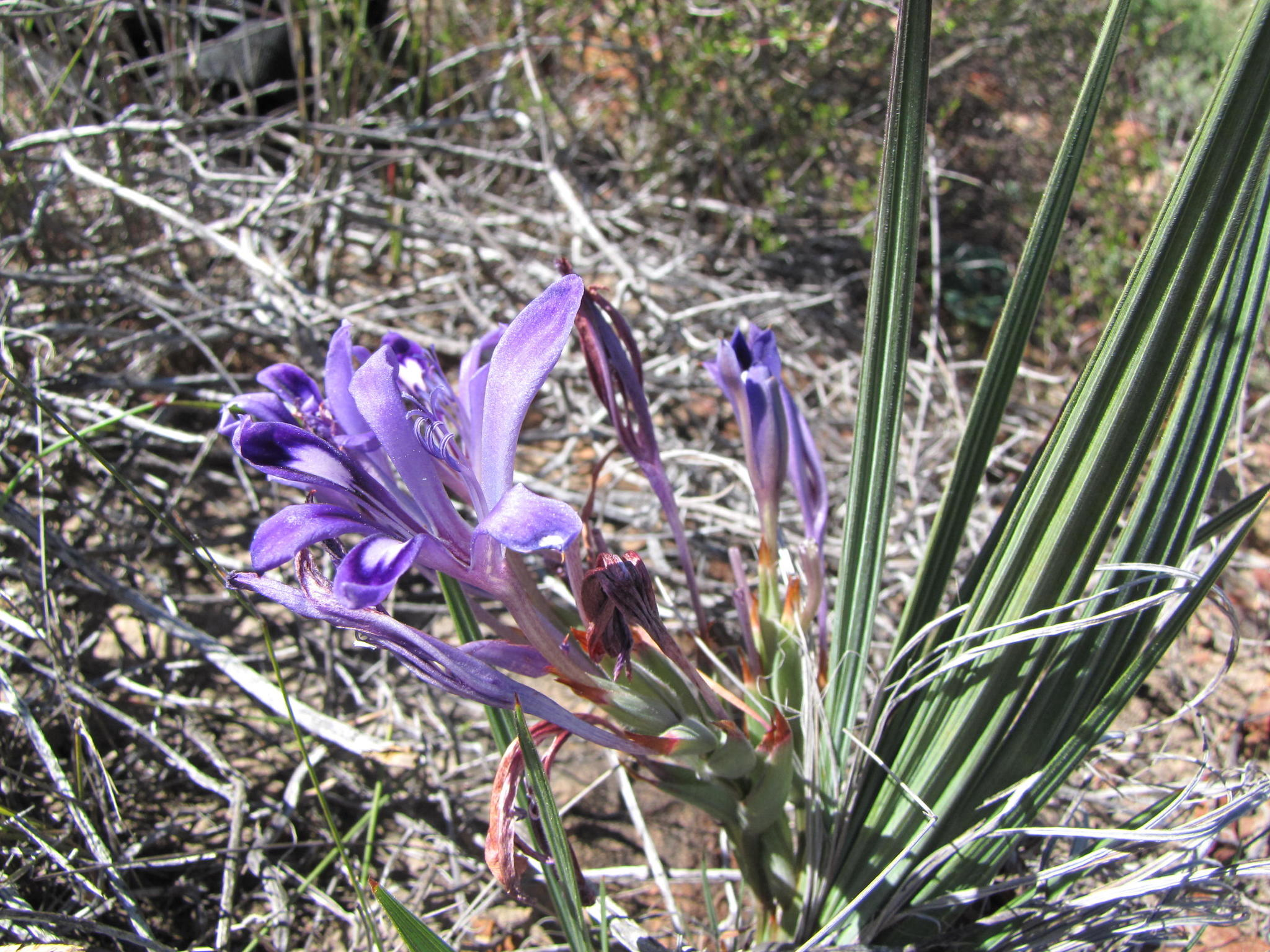

Scientific classification
- Kingdom: Plantae
- Clade: Tracheophytes
- Clade: Angiosperms
- Clade: Monocots
- Order: Asparagales
- Family: Iridaceae
- Genus: Babiana
- Species: B. rigidifolia

Binomial name
- Babiana rigidifolia Goldblatt & J.C.Manning

Synonyms
- Babiana sambucina var. unguiculata G.J.Lewis

= Babiana rigidifolia =

Species of flowering plant

Babiana rigidifolia is a species of geophytic, perennial flowering plant in the family Iridaceae. The species is endemic to the Northern Cape and the Western Cape.
