= Xenoscapa =

Scientific classification
- Kingdom: Plantae
- Clade: Embryophytes
- Clade: Tracheophytes
- Clade: Spermatophytes
- Clade: Angiosperms
- Clade: Monocots
- Order: Asparagales
- Family: Iridaceae
- Subfamily: Crocoideae
- Tribe: Freesieae
- Genus: Xenoscapa (Goldblatt) Goldblatt & J.C.Manning.

Type species
- Xenoscapa fistulosa (Sprengel ex Klatt) Goldblatt & J.C. Manning

Genus of flowering plants

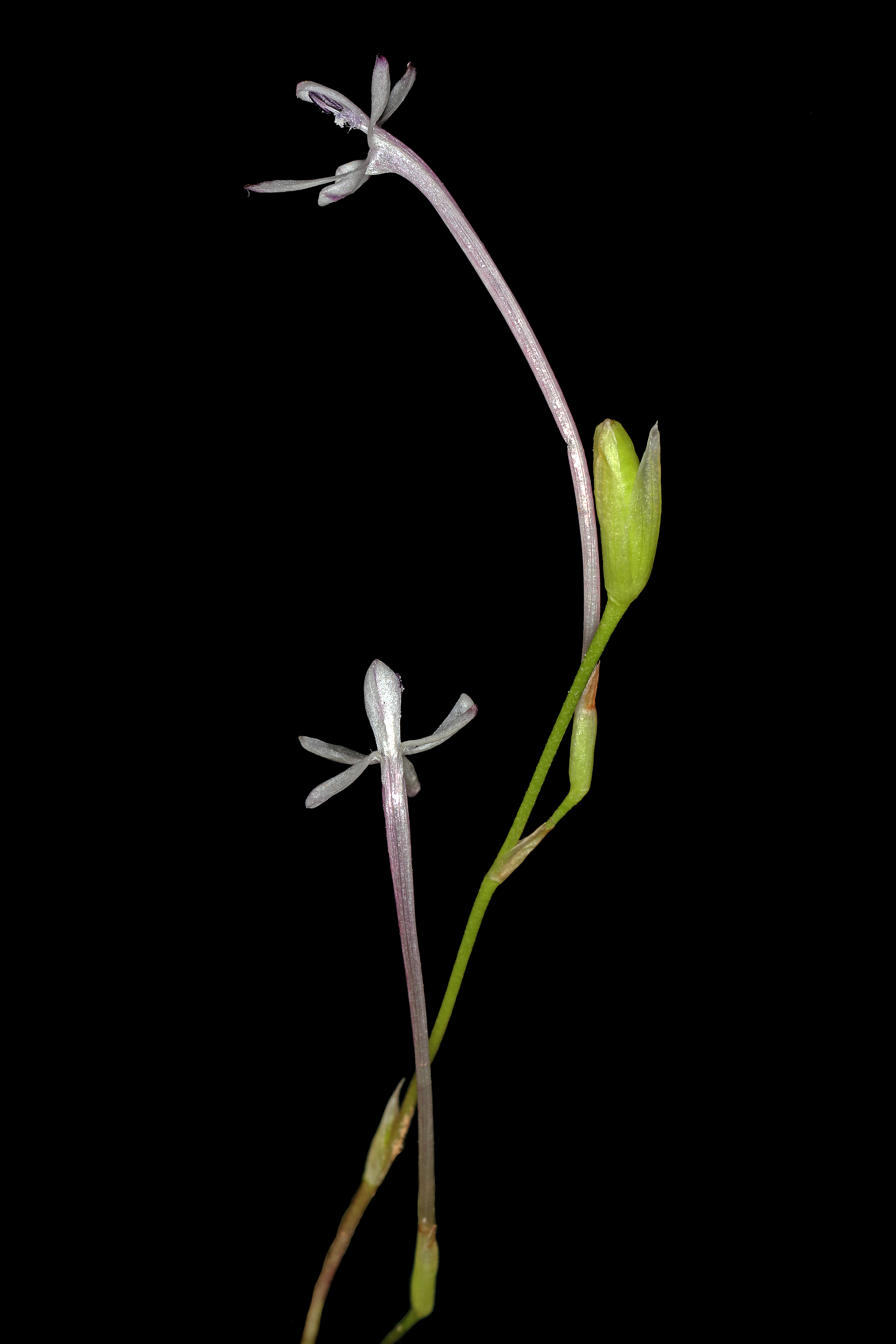
Xenoscapa fistulosa, two flowers and a developing fruit; Clanwilliam Wild Flower Show, Clanwilliam, Western Cape, South Africa.

Xenoscapa is a genus of herbaceous, perennial and bulbous plants in the family Iridaceae. It consists of only three species distributed in Africa, and is closely related to the genera Freesia. The genus name is derived from the Greek words xenos, meaning "strange", and scapa, meaning "flowering stem".

== Species ==
The list of Xenoscapa species, with their complete name and authority, and their geographic distribution is given below.

- Xenoscapa fistulosa (Spreng. ex Klatt) Goldblatt & J.C.Manning, Syst. Bot. 20: 172 (1995). Distributed from Namibia to South Africa.
- Xenoscapa grandiflora Goldblatt & J.C.Manning, Bothalia 41: 284 (2011). Namibia
- Xenoscapa uliginosa Goldblatt & J.C.Manning, Syst. Bot. 20: 173 (1995). South Africa.
