= Micranthus thereianthoides =

Scientific classification
- Kingdom: Plantae
- Clade: Tracheophytes
- Clade: Angiosperms
- Clade: Monocots
- Order: Asparagales
- Family: Iridaceae
- Genus: Micranthus
- Species: M. thereianthoides

Binomial name
- Micranthus thereianthoides Goldblatt & J.C.Manning, (2013)

Species of flowering plant

Micranthus thereianthoides is a species if flowering plant in the family Iridaceae. It is a perennial geophyte and is part of the fynbos ecoregion. The species is endemic to the Western Cape. It occurs on Paardeberg south of Malmesbury and is threatened by invasive plants.
