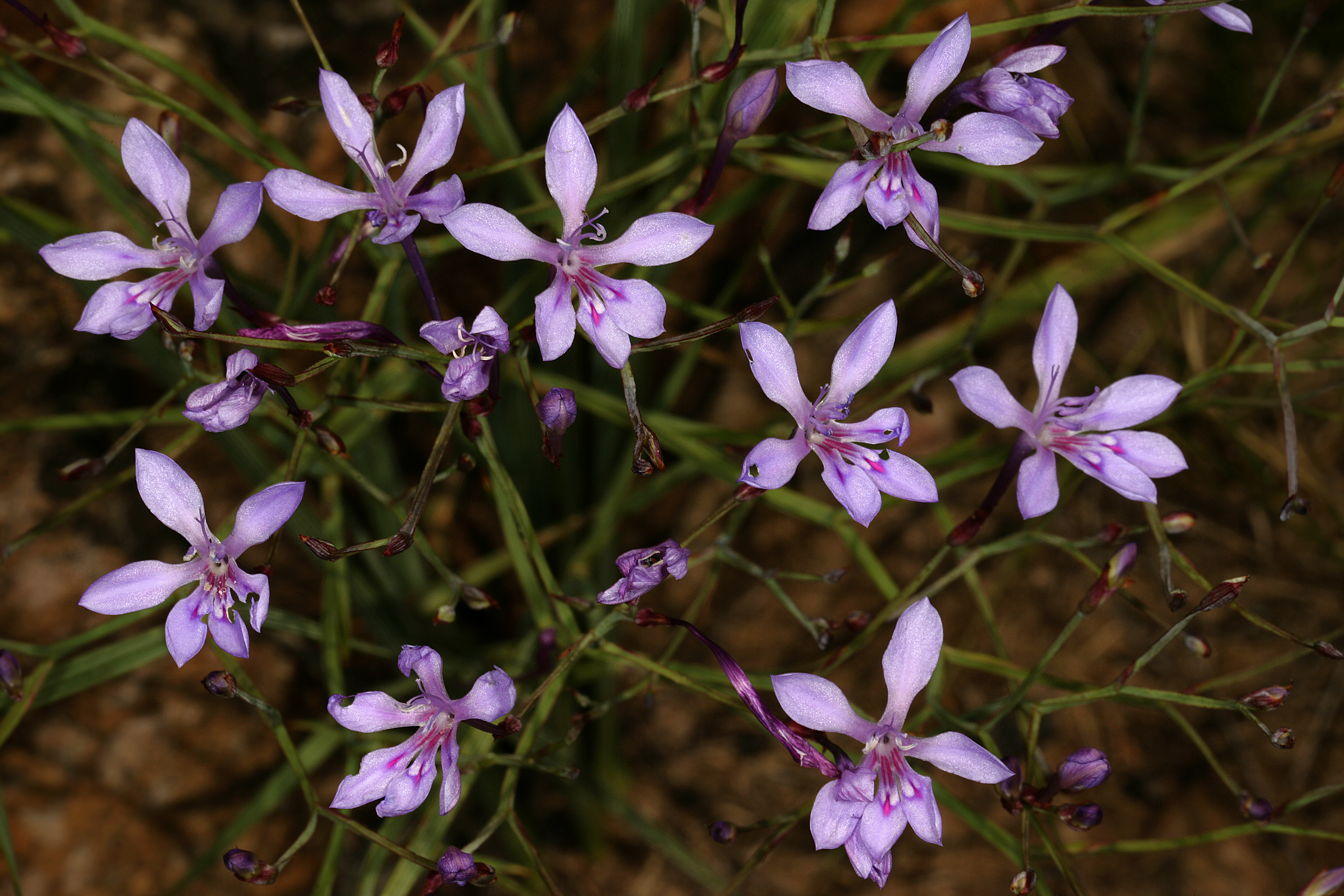
- Afrosolen sandersonii subsp. sandersonii

Scientific classification
- Kingdom: Plantae
- Clade: Tracheophytes
- Clade: Angiosperms
- Clade: Monocots
- Order: Asparagales
- Family: Iridaceae
- Genus: Afrosolen; Goldblatt & J.C.Manning

Synonyms
- Psilosiphon Welw. ex Goldblatt & J.C.Manning

= Afrosolen =

Genus of flowering plants

Afrosolen is a genus of flowering plants belonging to the family Iridaceae.

Its native range is Nigeria to Eritrea and Southern Africa.

Species:

- Afrosolen abyssinicus (R.Br. ex A.Rich.) Goldblatt & J.C.Manning
- Afrosolen avasmontanus (Dinter) Goldblatt & J.C.Manning
- Afrosolen bainesii (Baker) Goldblatt & J.C.Manning
- Afrosolen coeruleus (Schinz) Goldblatt & J.C.Manning
- Afrosolen erongoensis (Goldblatt & J.C.Manning) Goldblatt & J.C.Manning
- Afrosolen erythranthus (Klotzsch ex Klatt) Goldblatt & J.C.Manning
- Afrosolen gracilis (Vaupel) Goldblatt & J.C.Manning
- Afrosolen masukuensis (Vaupel & Schltr.) Goldblatt & J.C.Manning
- Afrosolen otaviensis (R.C.Foster) Goldblatt & J.C.Manning
- Afrosolen rivularis (Wanntorp) Goldblatt & J.C.Manning
- Afrosolen sandersonii (Baker) Goldblatt & J.C.Manning
- Afrosolen schimperi (Asch. & Klatt) Goldblatt & J.C.Manning
- Afrosolen setifolius (Harms) Goldblatt & J.C.Manning
- Afrosolen teretifolius (Geerinck, Lisowski, Malaisse & Symoens) Goldblatt & J.C.Manning
- Afrosolen zambesiacus (Goldblatt) Goldblatt & J.C.Manning
