= Peacock flower =

Peacock flower can refer to:

- Albizia gummifera, a tree native to tropical Africa and Madagascar
- Caesalpinia pulcherrima, a shrub native to the Americas
- Delonix regia, a tree native to Madagascar
- Dietes bicolor, a clump-forming plant native to South Africa
- Tigridia pavonia, a clump-forming plant native to Mexico and central America

== See also ==
- Adenanthera pavonina or peacock flower fence
- Gladiolus murielae, Gladiolus callianthus, or Acidanthera bicolor, called peacock gladiolus or peacock orchid
- Moraea villosa, a plant called peacock moraea
- Peacock flounder
