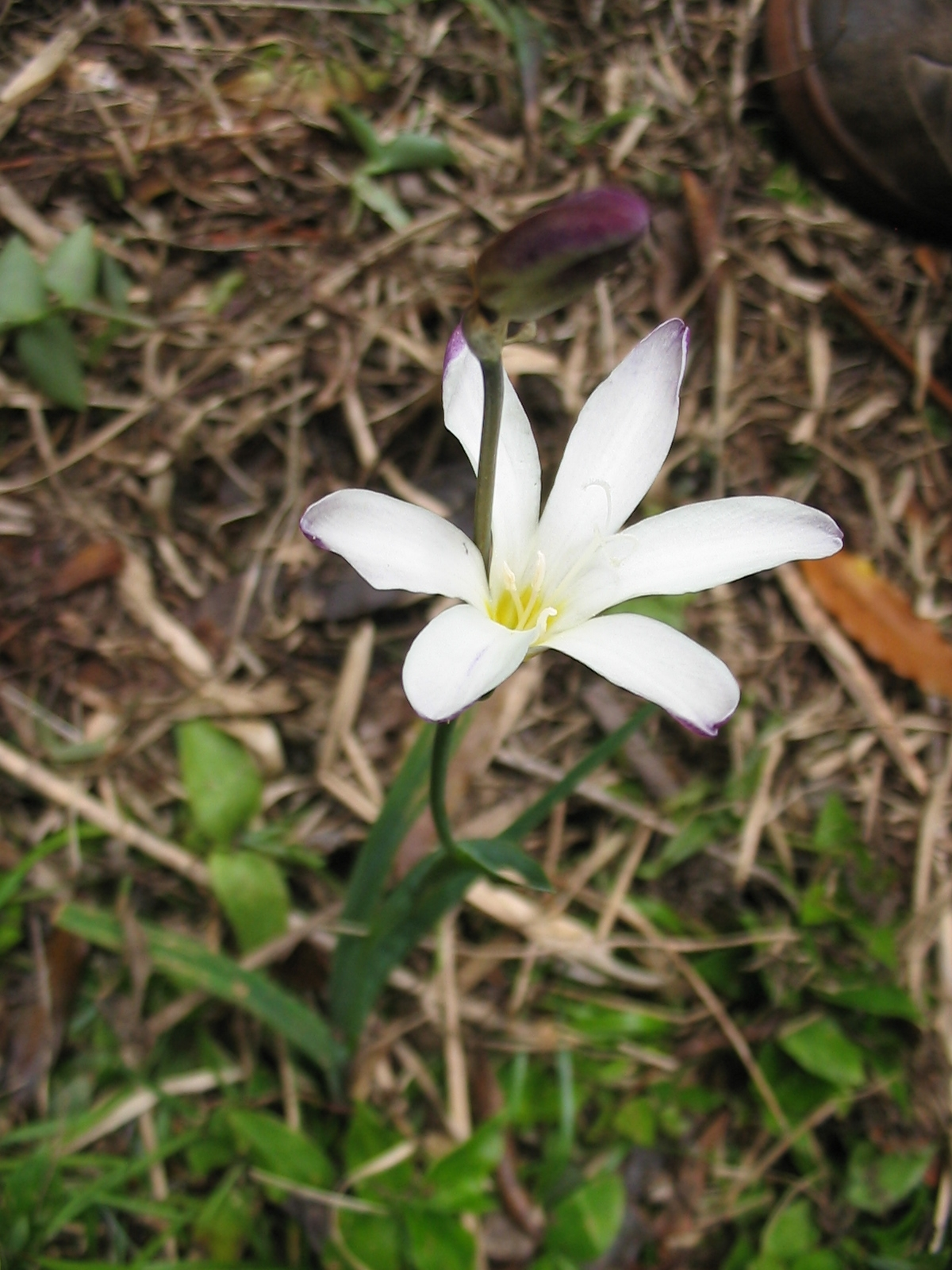
- Sparaxis bulbifera

Scientific classification
- Kingdom: Plantae
- Clade: Tracheophytes
- Clade: Angiosperms
- Clade: Monocots
- Order: Asparagales
- Family: Iridaceae
- Subfamily: Crocoideae
- Tribe: Croceae
- Genus: Sparaxis; Ker Gawl.

Type species
- Sparaxis bulbifera (L.) Ker Gawler

Synonyms
- Anactorion Raf.; ×Sparanthera Cif. & Giacom.; Streptanthera Sweet; Synnotia Sweet

= Sparaxis =

Genus of flowering plants

Sparaxis is a genus of flowering plants called the harlequin flowers. It belongs to the iris family Iridaceae with about 13 species endemic to Cape Province, South Africa.

All are perennials that grow during the wet winter season, flower in spring and survive underground as dormant corms over summer. Their conspicuous flowers have six tepals, which in most species are equal in size and shape.

Sparaxis bulbifera has flowers from cream to yellow or purple. Sparaxis grandiflora is a similar but larger plant. In cultivation in the UK it has gained the Royal Horticultural Society's Award of Garden Merit. Sparaxis tricolor has bright red flowers with yellow and black centres. Many named hybrid cultivars were bred from S. bulbifera and S. tricolor.

A group of species with asymmetrical flowers marked in mauve and yellow, including Sparaxis variegata and Sparaxis villosa, was formerly treated as the genus Synnotia.

The genus name is derived from the Greek word sparasso, meaning "to tear", and alludes to the shape of the floral bracts.

== Species ==
- Sparaxis auriculata Goldblatt & J.C.Manning
- Sparaxis bulbifera (L.) Ker Gawl.
- Sparaxis calcicola Goldblatt & J.C.Manning
- Sparaxis caryophyllacea Goldblatt
- Sparaxis elegans (Sweet) Goldblatt
- Sparaxis fragrans (Jacq.) Ker Gawl.
- Sparaxis galeata Ker Gawl.
- Sparaxis grandiflora (D.Delaroche) Ker Gawl.
  - Sparaxis grandiflora subsp. grandiflora (D.Delaroche) Ker Gawl.
  - Sparaxis grandiflora subsp. acutiloba Goldblatt
  - Sparaxis grandiflora subsp. fimbriata (Lam.) Goldblatt
  - Sparaxis grandiflora subsp. violacea (Eckl.) Goldblatt
- Sparaxis maculosa Goldblatt
- Sparaxis metelerkampiae (L.Bolus) Goldblatt & J.C.Manning
- Sparaxis parviflora (G.J.Lewis) Goldblatt
- Sparaxis pillansii L.Bolus
- Sparaxis roxburghii (Baker) Goldblatt
- Sparaxis tricolor (Schneev.) Ker Gawl.
- Sparaxis variegata (Sweet) Goldblatt
- Sparaxis villosa (Burm.f.) Goldblatt
