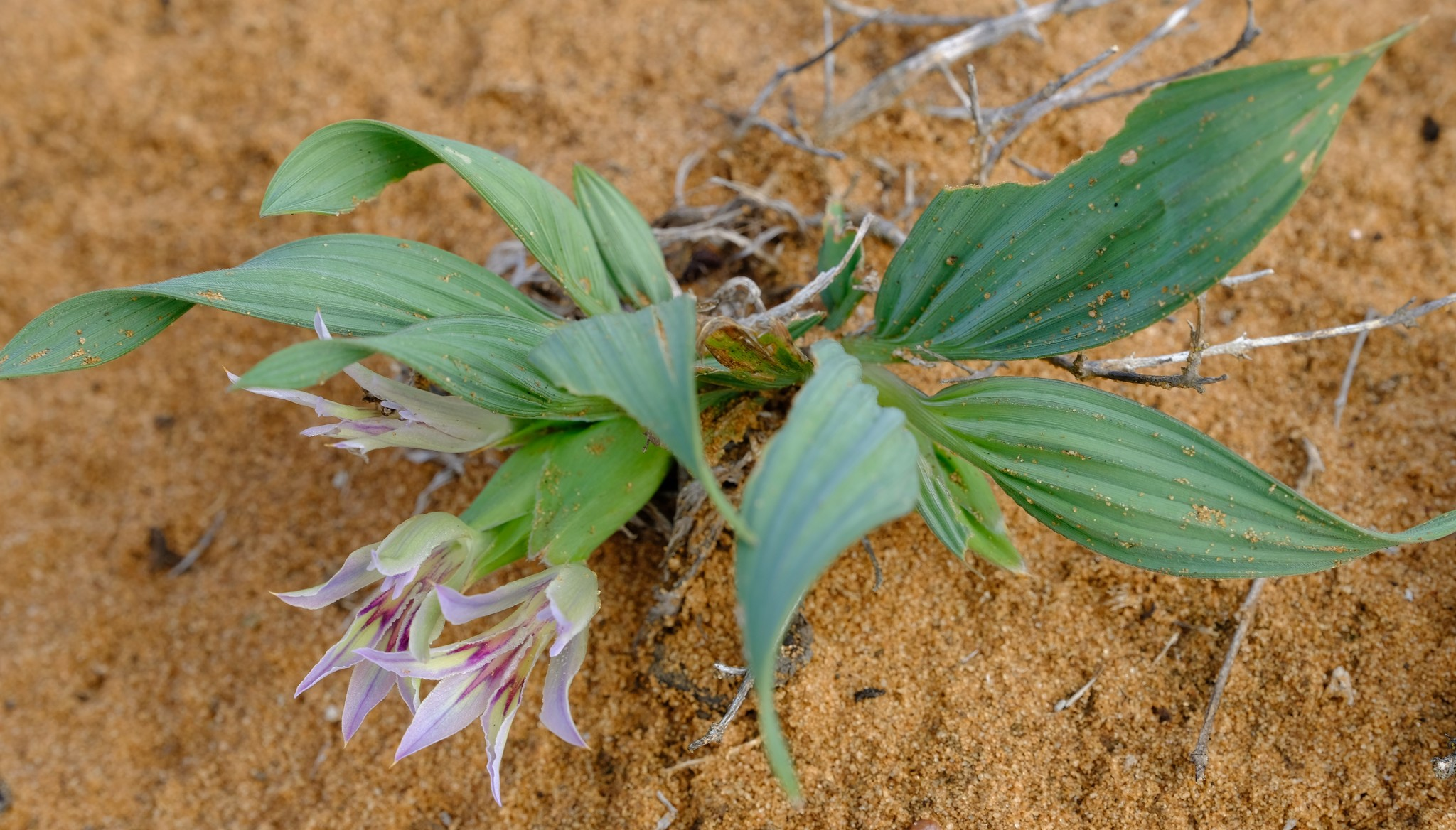

Scientific classification
- Kingdom: Plantae
- Clade: Tracheophytes
- Clade: Angiosperms
- Clade: Monocots
- Order: Asparagales
- Family: Iridaceae
- Genus: Babiana
- Species: B. virescens

Binomial name
- Babiana virescens Goldblatt & J.C.Manning

= Babiana virescens =

Species of plant

Babiana virescens is a species of flowering plant from the family Iridaceae.

== Description ==
Plants range from 70 - 200 mm tall. Leaves are oblong to lanceolate, with a slight twist in distally. Leaf blades are suberect and 10-18mm long. Plants can host from three to seven flowers. Flowers range in colour from a pale grey-green to greyish lilac. Petals host purple streaks. Flowers are zygomorphic and possess a sweet spicy scent.

== Distribution and habitat ==
Babiana virescens is endemic to South Africa where it can be found in both the Northern Cape and Western Cape.

This species can be found in elevated habitat such as hillsides and valley slopes where it grows in shrublands. It can be found in both Fynbos and Succulent Karoo shrubland habitats.

B. virescens has a preference for loam and gravely soils where it can also sometimes be found growing alongside outcrops of granite rock.

== Threats ==
Populations of B. virescens are threatened by habitat loss due to human activity. Mining occurs in sites where the species is found and causes damage to their habitat. It is believed that less than 20% of their habitat has been irreversibly damaged due to human activities.
