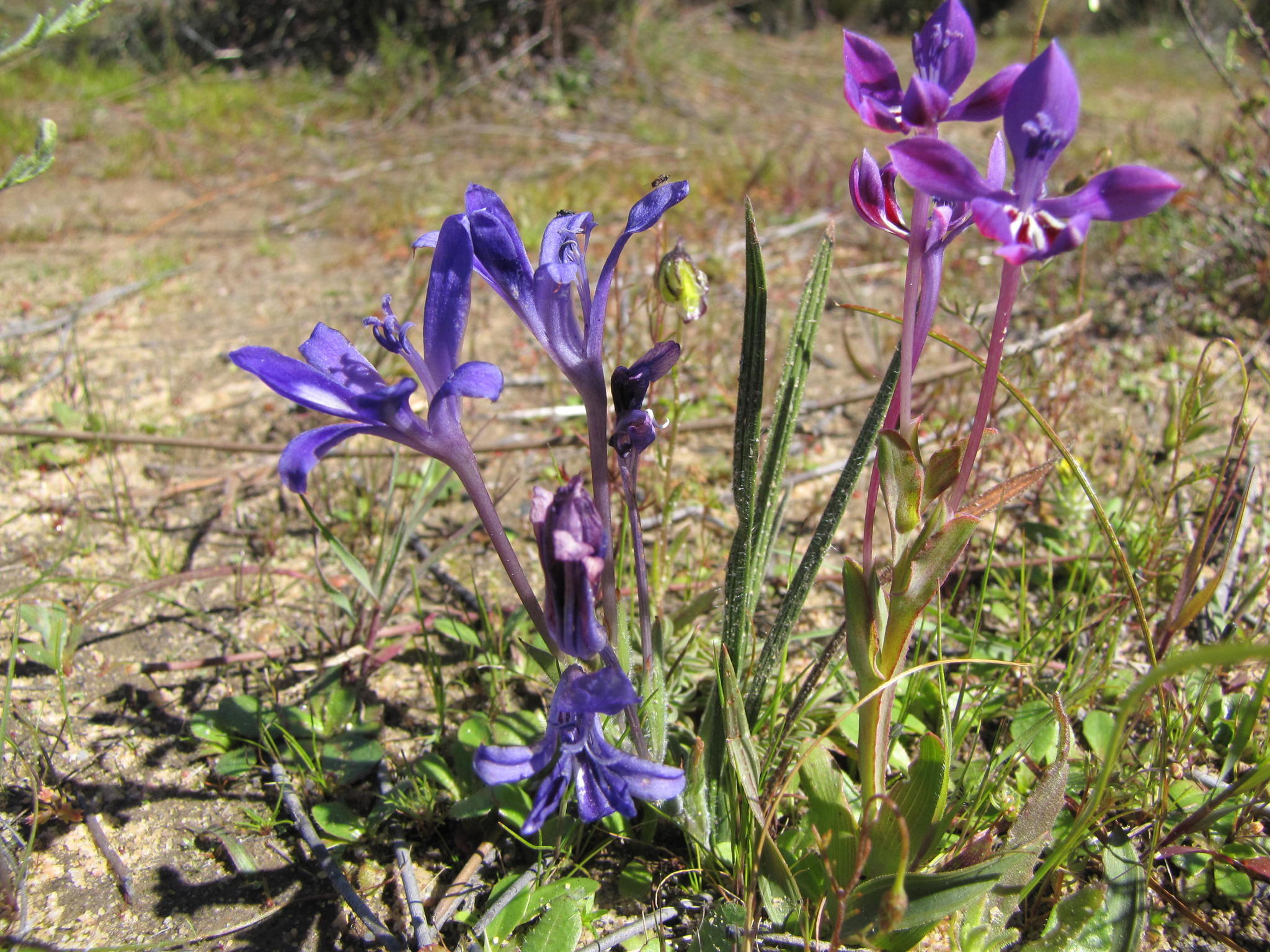

Scientific classification
- Kingdom: Plantae
- Clade: Tracheophytes
- Clade: Angiosperms
- Clade: Monocots
- Order: Asparagales
- Family: Iridaceae
- Genus: Babiana
- Species: B. engysiphon

Binomial name
- Babiana engysiphon J.C.Manning & Goldblatt

= Babiana engysiphon =

Species of flowering plant

Babiana engysiphon is a species of geophytic, perennial flowering plant in the family Iridaceae. It is part of the fynbos ecoregion. The species is endemic to the Northern Cape. It occurs on the southern Bokkeveld Mountains escarpment between Botterkloof and Gifberg.
