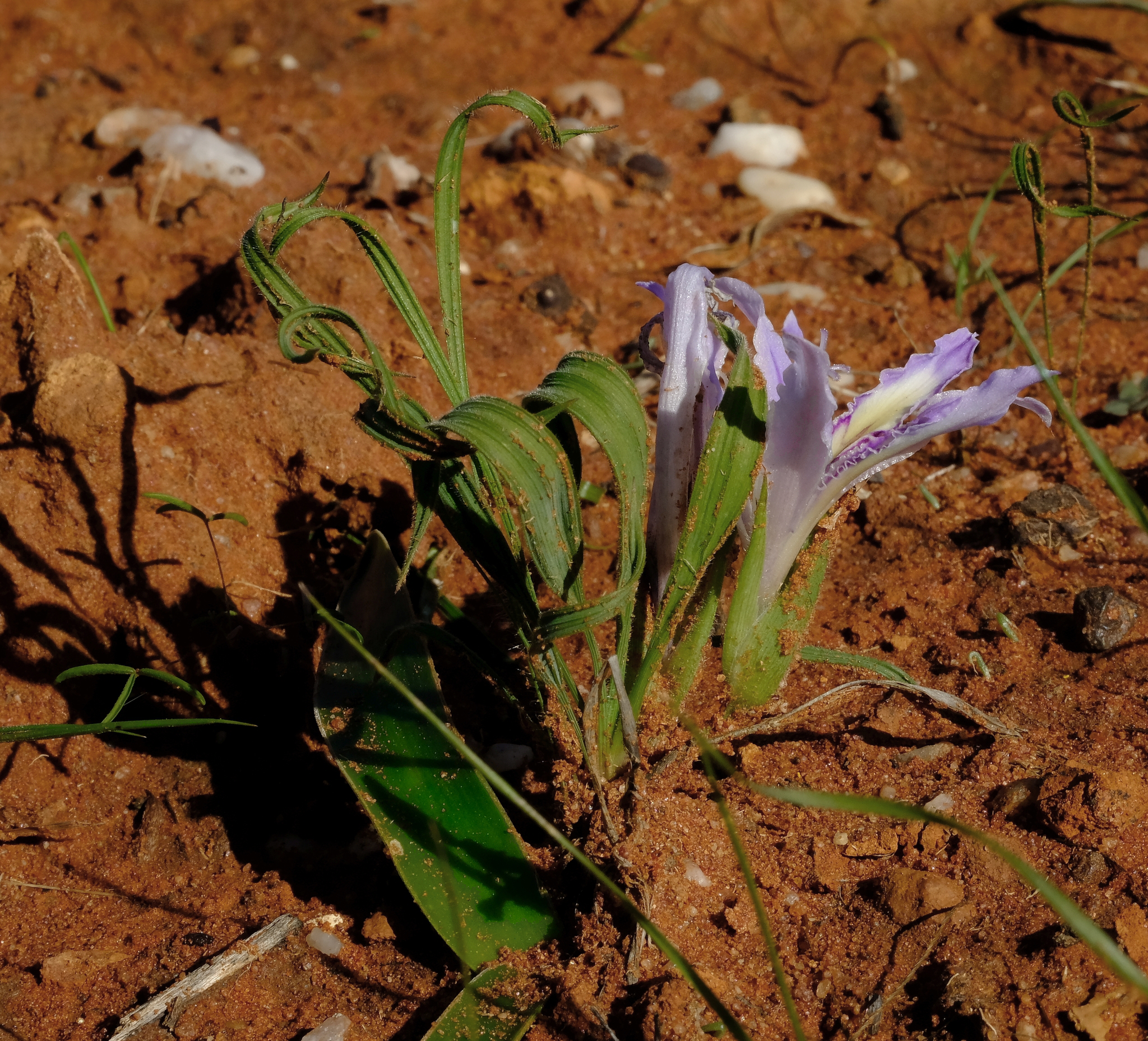

Scientific classification
- Kingdom: Plantae
- Clade: Tracheophytes
- Clade: Angiosperms
- Clade: Monocots
- Order: Asparagales
- Family: Iridaceae
- Genus: Babiana
- Species: B. toximontana

Binomial name
- Babiana toximontana J.C.Manning & Goldblatt

= Babiana toximontana =

Species of flowering plant

Babiana toximontana is a species of geophytic, perennial flowering plant in the family Iridaceae. The species is endemic to the Western Cape and occurs on the foothills of the Matsikammaberge and the Gifberg. It is part of the Bokkeveld fynbos. The plant has a range of 75 km^{2} and there are five subpopulations. The species is threatened by the rooibos tea industry which has taken over some of its habitat.
