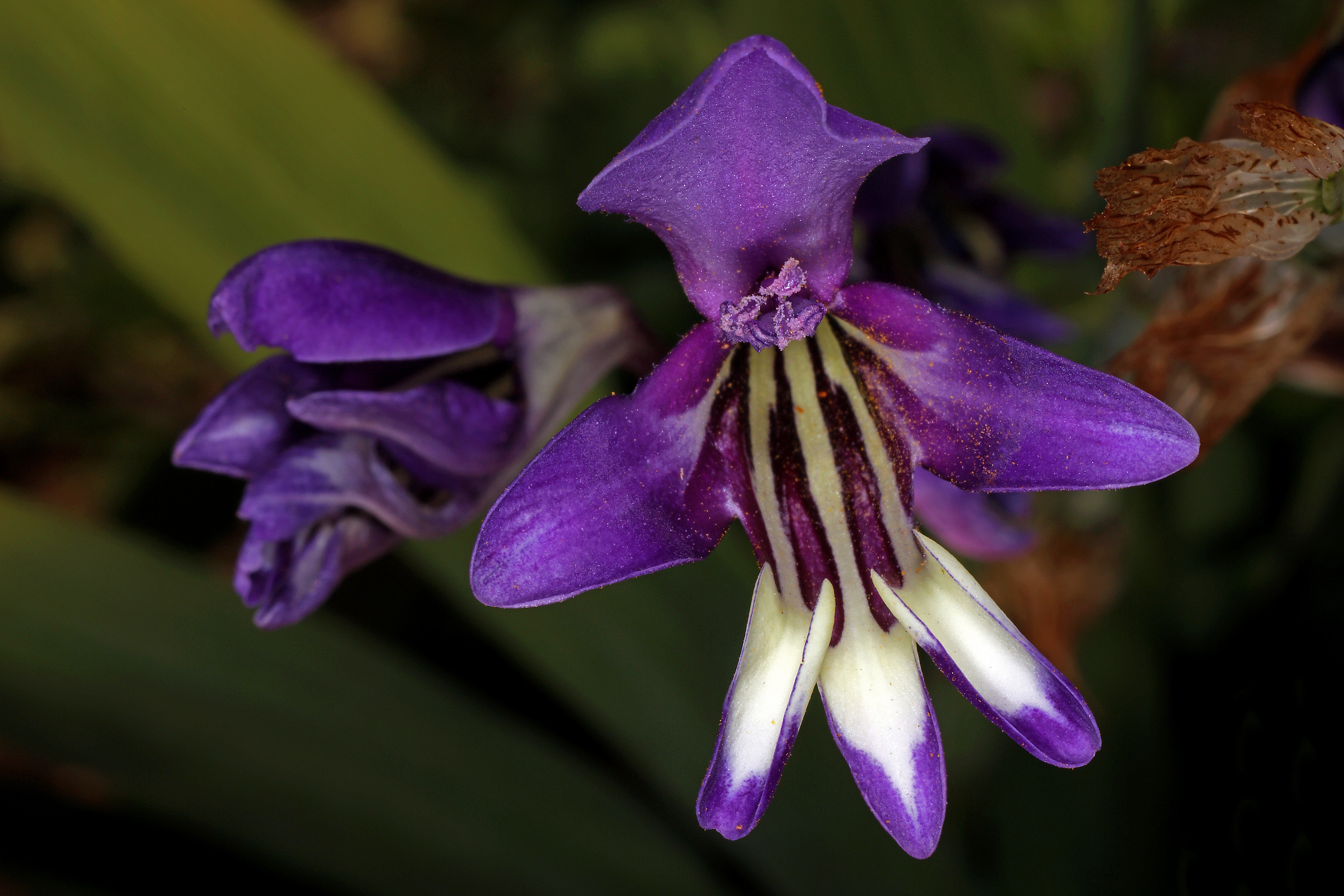

Scientific classification
- Kingdom: Plantae
- Clade: Tracheophytes
- Clade: Angiosperms
- Clade: Monocots
- Order: Asparagales
- Family: Iridaceae
- Genus: Sparaxis
- Species: S. metelerkampiae

Binomial name
- Sparaxis metelerkampiae (L.Bolus) Goldblatt & J.C.Manning 1999

= Sparaxis metelerkampiae =

Species of flowering plant

Sparaxis metelerkampiae, is a species of Sparaxis found in Western Cape, South Africa.
