= Muscosomorphe =

Scientific classification
- Kingdom: Plantae
- Clade: Tracheophytes
- Clade: Angiosperms
- Clade: Eudicots
- Clade: Asterids
- Order: Asterales
- Family: Asteraceae
- Tribe: Gnaphalieae
- Subtribe: Leyseriinae
- Genus: Muscosomorphe; J.C.Manning
- Species: M. aretioides

Binomial name
- Muscosomorphe aretioides (Turcz.) J.C.Manning

Synonyms
- Bryomorphe aretioides (Turcz.) Druce; Helichrysum aretioides Turcz. (1851) (basionym)

Genus of flowering plants

Muscosomorphe is a monotypic genus of flowering plants in the family Asteraceae, containing the single species Muscosomorphe aretioides. It is endemic to South Africa, where it grows in sandstone fynbos in the Western Cape.

This is a compact, tufted plant that superficially resembles a patch of moss. It forms a mound just a few centimeters tall. The branches are covered in small, linear leaves. The flower heads each contain 6 or 7 white ray florets and 7 to 9 red disc florets. The fruit has a plumelike white pappus.

The species grows in exposed, rocky habitat, anchoring in thin soil accumulated in rock crevices. It tolerates cold temperatures, dry conditions, wind, and snow.

The plant is widespread in its range and not declining.
