= Sparaxis variegata =

Scientific classification
- Kingdom: Plantae
- Clade: Tracheophytes
- Clade: Angiosperms
- Clade: Monocots
- Order: Asparagales
- Family: Iridaceae
- Genus: Sparaxis
- Species: S. variegata

Binomial name
- Sparaxis variegata (Sweet) Goldblatt

Synonyms
- Sparaxis wattii Harv.; Synnotia variegata Sweet

Species of flowering plant

Sparaxis variegata, the variegated satinflower, is a perennial plant and geophyte belonging to the genus Sparaxis and is part of the fynbos. The species is endemic to the Western Cape and occurs in the Olifants River Valley between Klawer and Clanwilliam. The plant has a range of less than 667 km^{2} and the plant currently has no threats.
