= Sparaxis maculosa =

Scientific classification
- Kingdom: Plantae
- Clade: Tracheophytes
- Clade: Angiosperms
- Clade: Monocots
- Order: Asparagales
- Family: Iridaceae
- Genus: Sparaxis
- Species: S. maculosa

Binomial name
- Sparaxis maculosa Goldblatt

Species of flowering plant

Sparaxis maculosa, the darkcentre satinflower, is a perennial plant and geophyte belonging to the genus Sparaxis and is part of the fynbos and renosterveld. The species is endemic to the Western Cape and occurs in Villiersdorp. The plant has a range of 53 km^{2}. There are four to five sub-populations that together number only 400 plants. The plant has already lost 50% of its habitat to crop cultivation and the construction of dams. Overgrazing is also a threat, while in one sub-population invasive plants are also a threat.
