= Xenoscapa grandiflora =

Scientific classification
- Kingdom: Plantae
- Clade: Tracheophytes
- Clade: Angiosperms
- Clade: Monocots
- Order: Asparagales
- Family: Iridaceae
- Genus: Xenoscapa
- Species: X. grandiflora

Binomial name
- Xenoscapa grandiflora Goldblatt & J.C.Manning, (2011)

Species of plant

Xenoscapa grandiflora is a species of flowering plant in the family Iridaceae. It is a perennial geophyte. The species is endemic to Namibia and occurs on Hohenzollern Peak on the southern side of the Hunsberge.
