= Xenoscapa uliginosa =

Scientific classification
- Kingdom: Plantae
- Clade: Tracheophytes
- Clade: Angiosperms
- Clade: Monocots
- Order: Asparagales
- Family: Iridaceae
- Genus: Xenoscapa
- Species: X. uliginosa

Binomial name
- Xenoscapa uliginosa Goldblatt & J.C.Manning, (1995)

Species of plant

Xenoscapa uliginosa is a species of flowering plant in the family Iridaceae. It is a perennial geophyte and is part of the fynbos ecoregion. The species is endemic to the Northern Cape and occurs on the Kamiesberge in Namaqualand. The plant is not threatened and is considered rare.
