= Wandflower =

Wandflower is a common name for several plants and may refer to:

- Dierama
- Galax
- Gaura
- Sparaxis tricolor
