= Sparaxis caryophyllacea =

Scientific classification
- Kingdom: Plantae
- Clade: Tracheophytes
- Clade: Angiosperms
- Clade: Monocots
- Order: Asparagales
- Family: Iridaceae
- Genus: Sparaxis
- Species: S. caryophyllacea

Binomial name
- Sparaxis caryophyllacea Goldblatt

Species of flowering plant

Sparaxis caryophyllacea, the speckle satinflower, is a perennial plant and geophyte belonging to the genus Sparaxis and is part of the fynbos. The species is endemic to the Western Cape and occurs on the Nardousberg at Vanrhynsdorp. There is one population here that is threatened by overgrazing and road maintenance there.
