= Sparaxis roxburghii =

Scientific classification
- Kingdom: Plantae
- Clade: Tracheophytes
- Clade: Angiosperms
- Clade: Monocots
- Order: Asparagales
- Family: Iridaceae
- Genus: Sparaxis
- Species: S. roxburghii

Binomial name
- Sparaxis roxburghii (Baker) Goldblatt

Synonyms
- Synnotia roxburghii (Baker) G.J.Lewis

Species of flowering plant

Sparaxis roxburghii, the collar satinflower, is a perennial plant and geophyte belonging to the genus Sparaxis and is part of the fynbos. The species is endemic to the Western Cape and occurs in the Olifants River Valley between Clanwilliam and Citrusdal. The plant has a range of less than 1 km^{2} and there is only one population of less than 250 plants. The plant has lost habitat to crop cultivation and its numbers are still declining because the population grows in the middle of a fruit orchard. The plant was once considered extinct.
