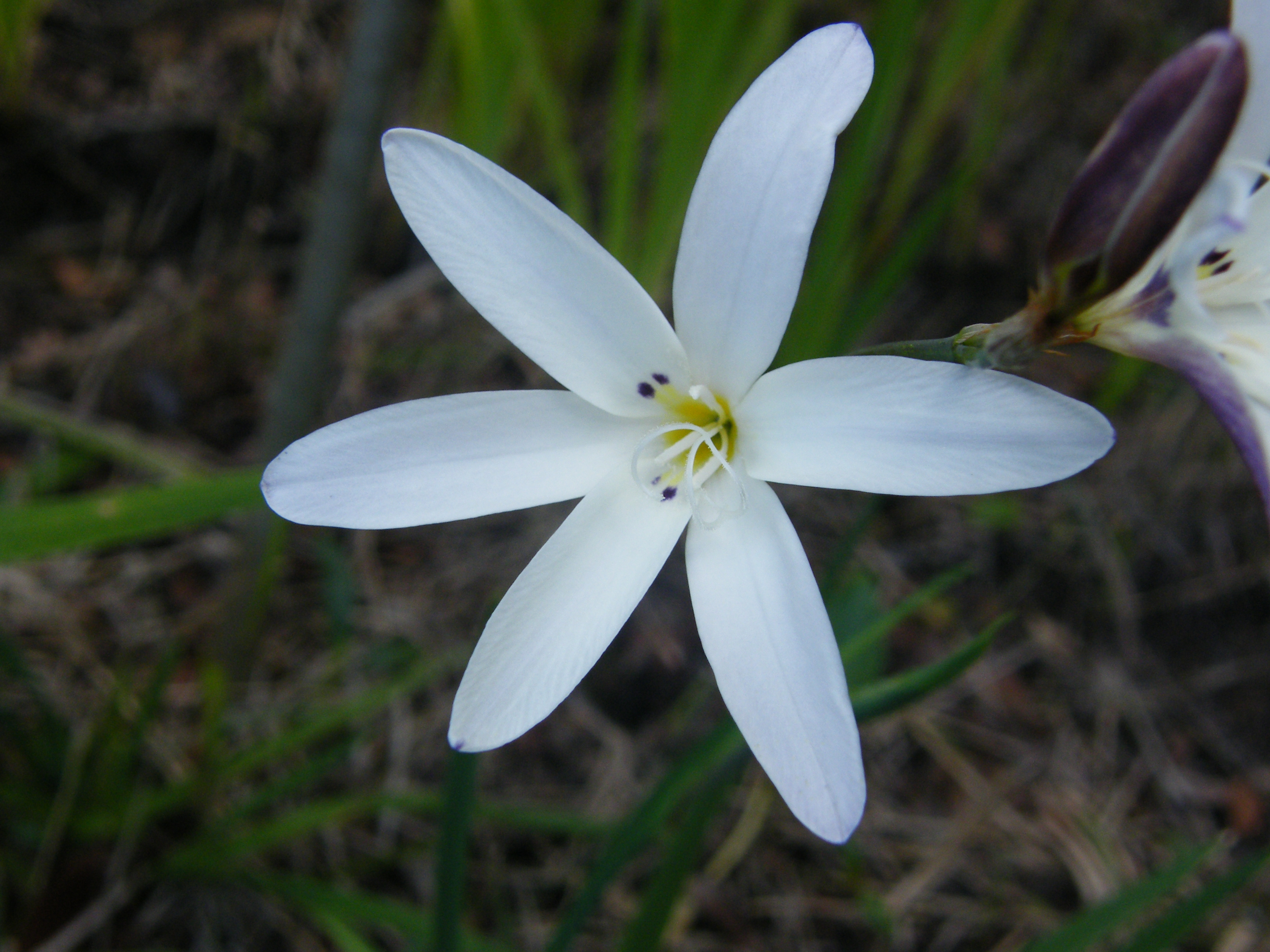

Scientific classification
- Kingdom: Plantae
- Clade: Tracheophytes
- Clade: Angiosperms
- Clade: Monocots
- Order: Asparagales
- Family: Iridaceae
- Genus: Sparaxis
- Species: S. grandiflora

Binomial name
- Sparaxis grandiflora (D.Delaroche) Ker Gawl.

Synonyms
- Ixia grandiflora D.Delaroche

= Sparaxis grandiflora =

Species of flowering plant

Sparaxis grandiflora, the plain harlequin flower, is a species of flowering plant in the genus Sparaxis, family Iridaceae, found in the Western Cape province of South Africa. It has gained the Royal Horticultural Society's Award of Garden Merit.

== Subspecies ==
- Sparaxis grandiflora subsp. grandiflora
- Sparaxis grandiflora subsp. acutiloba Goldblatt
- Sparaxis grandiflora subsp. fimbriata (Lam.) Goldblatt
- Sparaxis grandiflora subsp. violacea (Eckl.) Goldblatt
