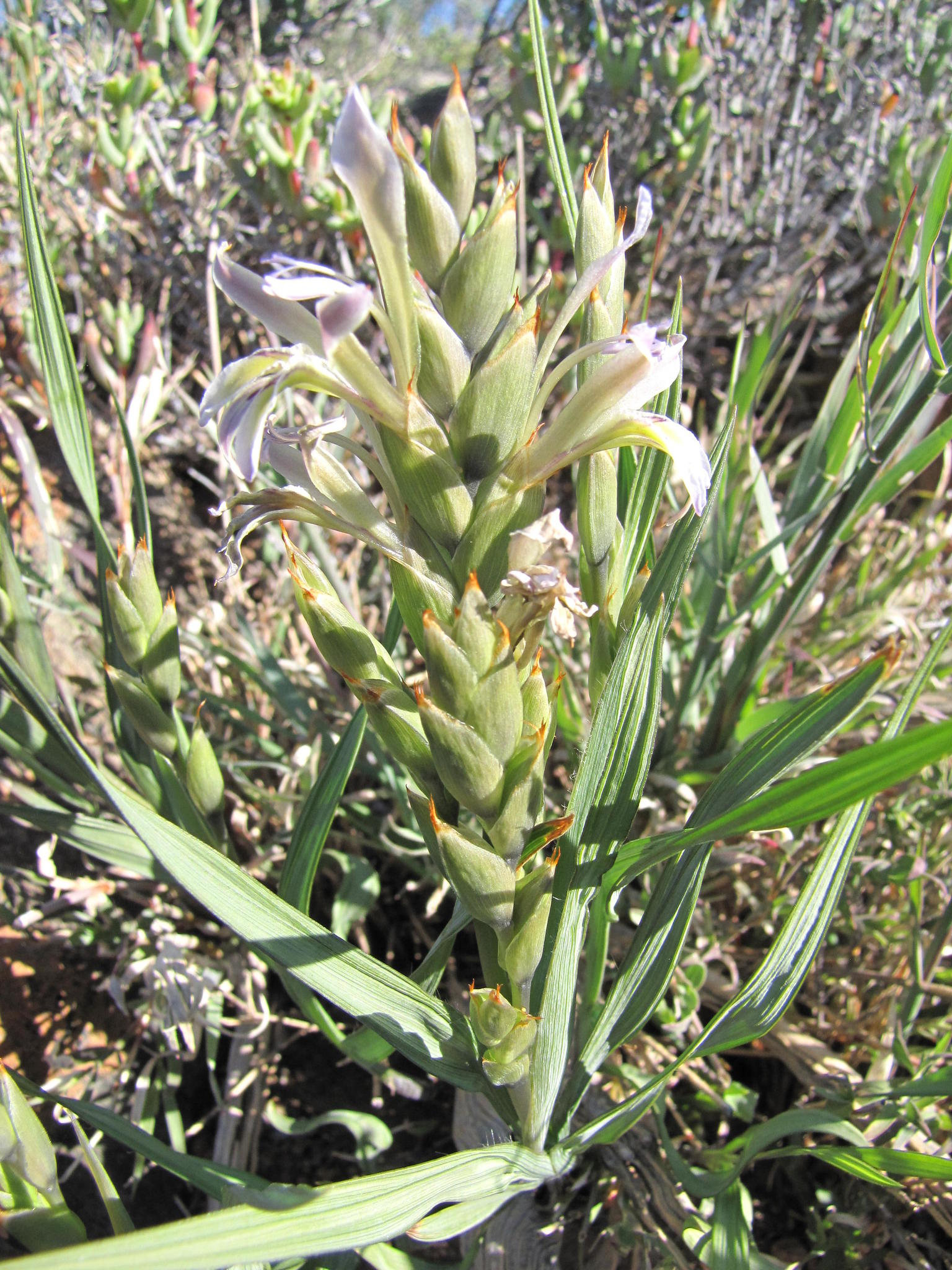

Scientific classification
- Kingdom: Plantae
- Clade: Tracheophytes
- Clade: Angiosperms
- Clade: Monocots
- Order: Asparagales
- Family: Iridaceae
- Genus: Babiana
- Species: B. planifolia

Binomial name
- Babiana planifolia (G.J.Lewis) Goldblatt & J.C.Manning, (2005)

Synonyms
- Babiana striata var. planifolia G.J.Lewis

= Babiana planifolia =

Species of flowering plant

Babiana planifolia is a perennial flowering plant and geophyte belonging to the genus Babiana. The species is endemic to the Northern Cape.
