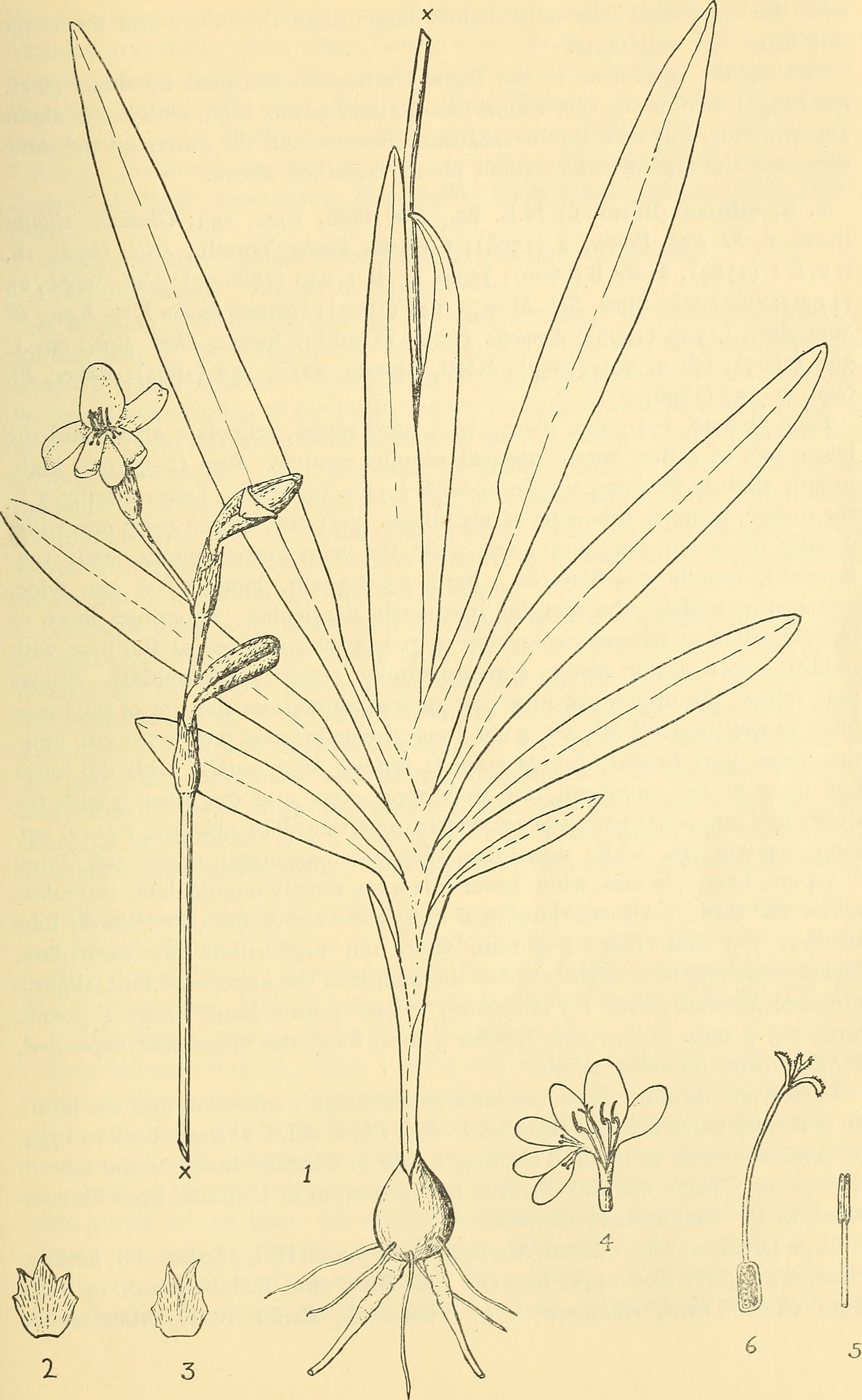

Scientific classification
- Kingdom: Plantae
- Clade: Tracheophytes
- Clade: Angiosperms
- Clade: Monocots
- Order: Asparagales
- Family: Iridaceae
- Genus: Sparaxis
- Species: S. parviflora

Binomial name
- Sparaxis parviflora (G.J.Lewis) Goldblatt

Synonyms
- Synnotia parviflora G.J.Lewis

= Sparaxis parviflora =

Species of flowering plant

Sparaxis parviflora, the tiny satinflower, is a perennial plant and geophyte belonging to the genus Sparaxis and is part of the fynbos and strandveld around Saldanha Bay. The species is endemic to the Western Cape and occurs from Saldanha Bay to Darling. The plant has a range of 997 km^{2} and there are eight to ten subpopulations. The plant has lost its habitat to crop cultivation and invasive plants.
