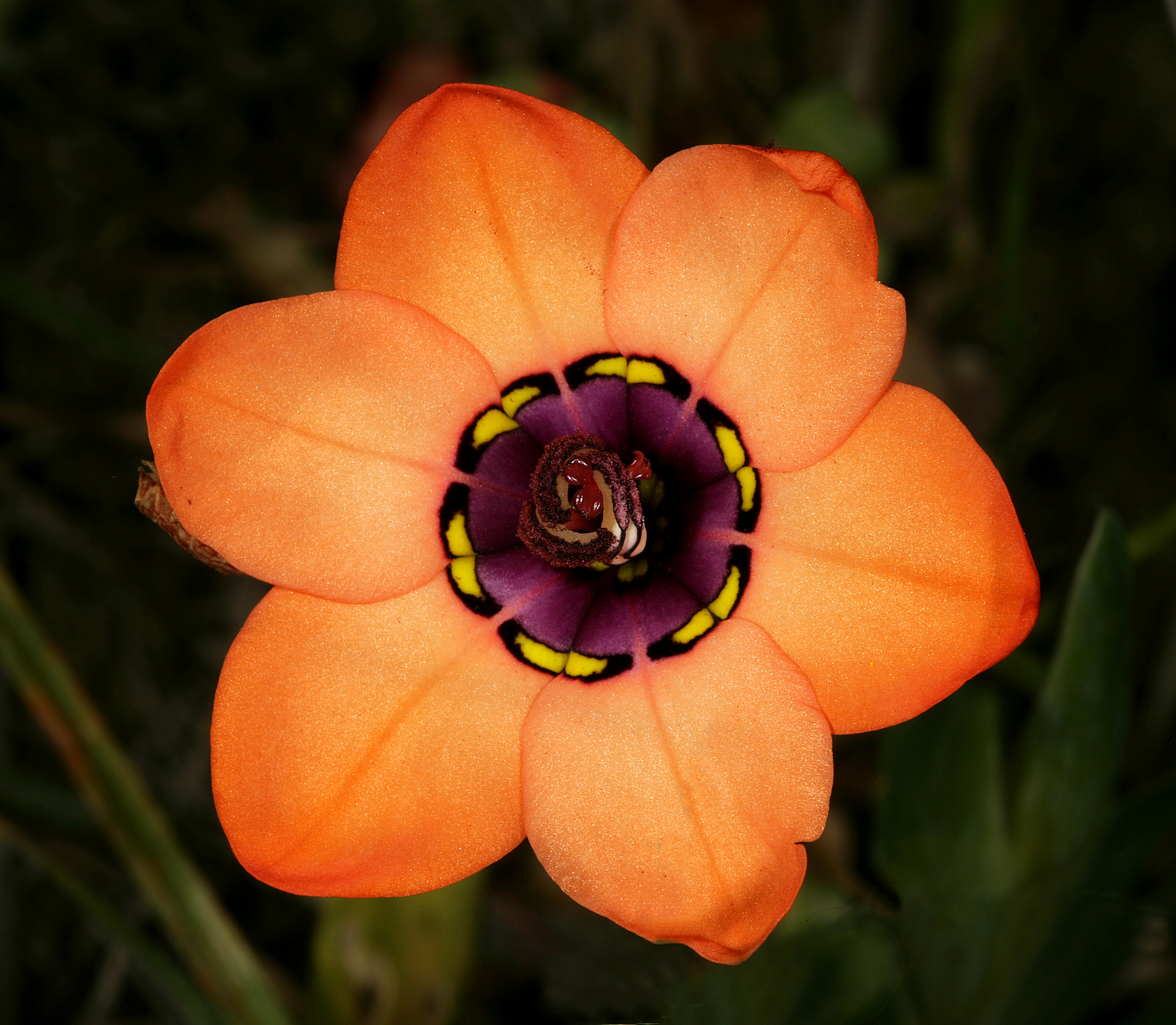

Scientific classification
- Kingdom: Plantae
- Clade: Tracheophytes
- Clade: Angiosperms
- Clade: Monocots
- Order: Asparagales
- Family: Iridaceae
- Genus: Sparaxis
- Species: S. elegans

Binomial name
- Sparaxis elegans (Sweet) Goldblatt

Synonyms
- Streptanthera elegans Sweet

= Sparaxis elegans =

Species of flowering plant

Sparaxis elegans, is a species of Sparaxis native to the west-southwestern Cape Provinces of South Africa.
