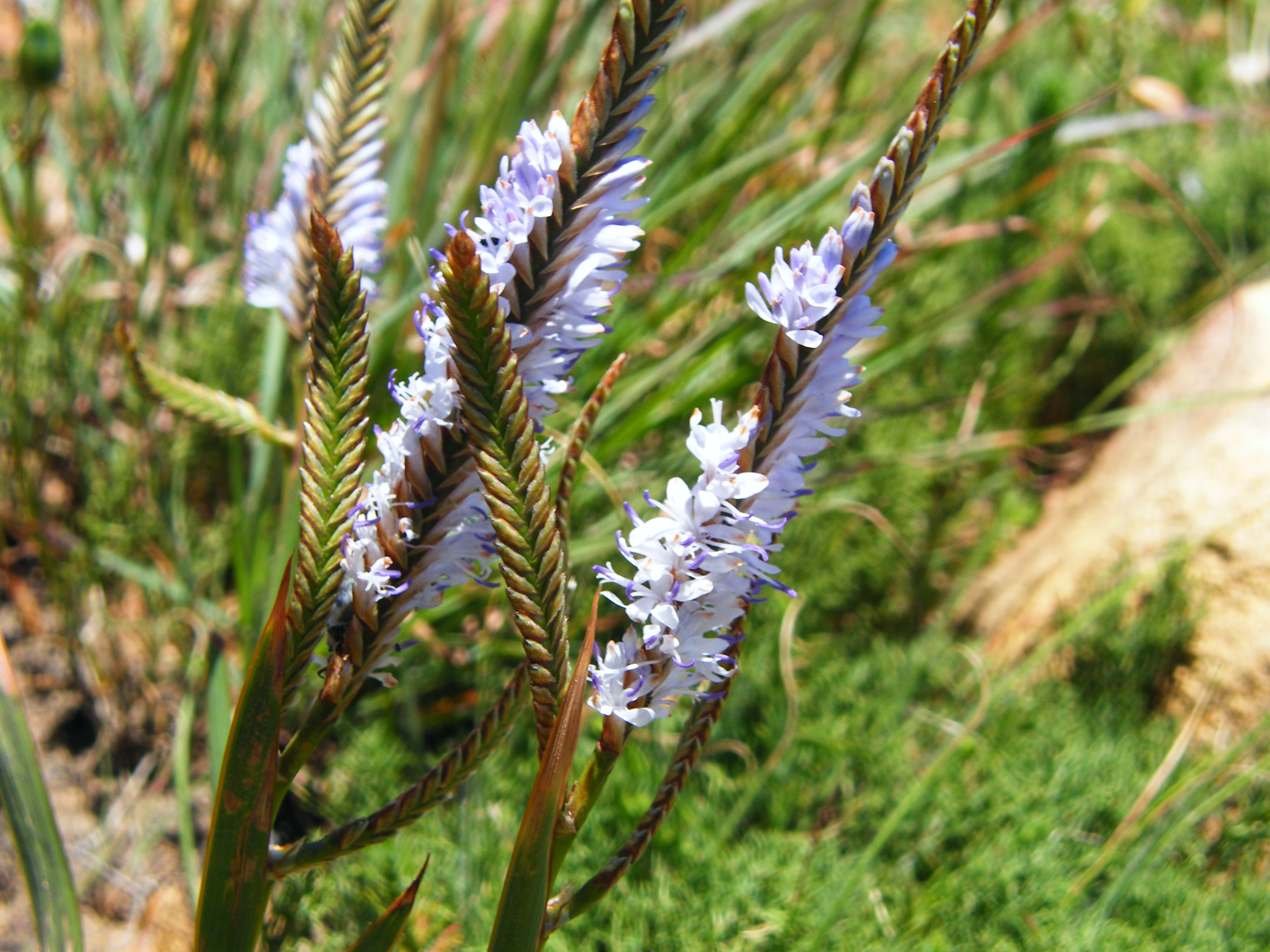
- Micranthus alopecuroides flowers

Scientific classification
- Kingdom: Plantae
- Clade: Tracheophytes
- Clade: Angiosperms
- Clade: Monocots
- Order: Asparagales
- Family: Iridaceae
- Subfamily: Crocoideae
- Tribe: Watsonieae
- Genus: Micranthus (Pers.) Eckl.

Type species
- Micranthus alopecuroides (L.) Eckl.

Synonyms
- Beilia Eckl. ex Kuntze; Paulomagnusia Kuntze

= Micranthus =

Genus of flowering plants

Micranthus is a genus of flowering plants in the family Iridaceae. The entire genus is endemic to Cape Province in South Africa.

The genus name is derived from the Greek words micro, meaning "small", and anthos, meaning "flower".

Species

- Micranthus alopecuroides (L.) Eckl., Topogr. Verz. Pflanzensamml. Ecklon: 43 (1827)
- Micranthus cruciatus Goldblatt & J.C.Manning (2013)
- Micranthus filifolius Goldblatt & J.C.Manning (2013)
- Micranthus plantagineus Eckl., Topogr. Verz. Pflanzensamml. Ecklon: 43 (1827)
- Micranthus simplex Goldblatt & J.C.Manning (2013)
- Micranthus thereianthoides Goldblatt & J.C.Manning (2013)
- Micranthus tubulosus (Burm.f.) N.E.Br., Bull. Misc. Inform. Kew 1929: 133 (1929)
