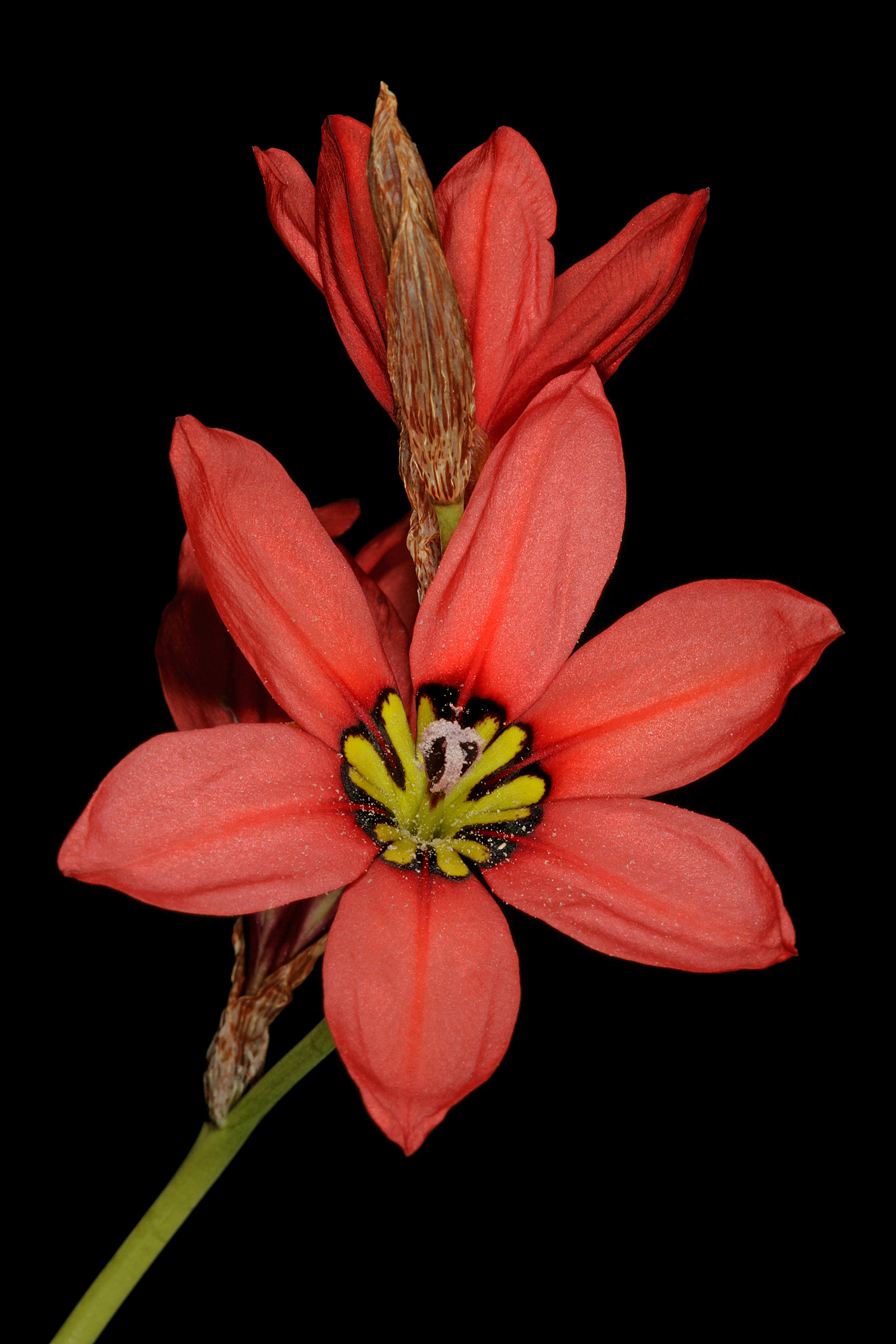

Scientific classification
- Kingdom: Plantae
- Clade: Tracheophytes
- Clade: Angiosperms
- Clade: Monocots
- Order: Asparagales
- Family: Iridaceae
- Genus: Sparaxis
- Species: S. pillansii

Binomial name
- Sparaxis pillansii L.Bolus 1969

= Sparaxis pillansii =

Species of flowering plant

Sparaxis pillansii, is a species of Sparaxis found in Northern Cape, South Africa.
