= Micranthus tubulosus =

Scientific classification
- Kingdom: Plantae
- Clade: Tracheophytes
- Clade: Angiosperms
- Clade: Monocots
- Order: Asparagales
- Family: Iridaceae
- Genus: Micranthus
- Species: M. tubulosus

Binomial name
- Micranthus tubulosus (Burm.f) N.E.Br., (1929)

Synonyms
- Gladiolus fistulosus Jacq.; Gladiolus tubulosus Burm.f.; Ixia cepacea Redouté

Species of flowering plant

Micranthus tubulosus is a perennial geophyte belonging to the genus Micranthus and is part of the renosterveld. The species is endemic to the Western Cape.
