= Sparaxis fragrans =

Scientific classification
- Kingdom: Plantae
- Clade: Tracheophytes
- Clade: Angiosperms
- Clade: Monocots
- Order: Asparagales
- Family: Iridaceae
- Genus: Sparaxis
- Species: S. fragrans

Binomial name
- Sparaxis fragrans (Jacq.) Ker Gawl.

Synonyms
- Gladiolus odorus Schrank; Ixia fragrans Jacq.; Ixia sordida Hornem.; Romulea fragrans (Jacq.) Eckl.; Synnotia stenophylla Baker

Species of flowering plant

Sparaxis fragrans, the stinky satinflower, is a perennial plant and geophyte belonging to the genus Sparaxis and is part of the fynbos. The species is endemic to the Western Cape and occurs from Theewaterskloof to Botrivier and Napier. The plant has a range of 595 km^{2} and has already lost 905 of its habitat to crop cultivation and invasive plants. The remaining sub-populations are fragmented, the largest population has less than 100 plants.
