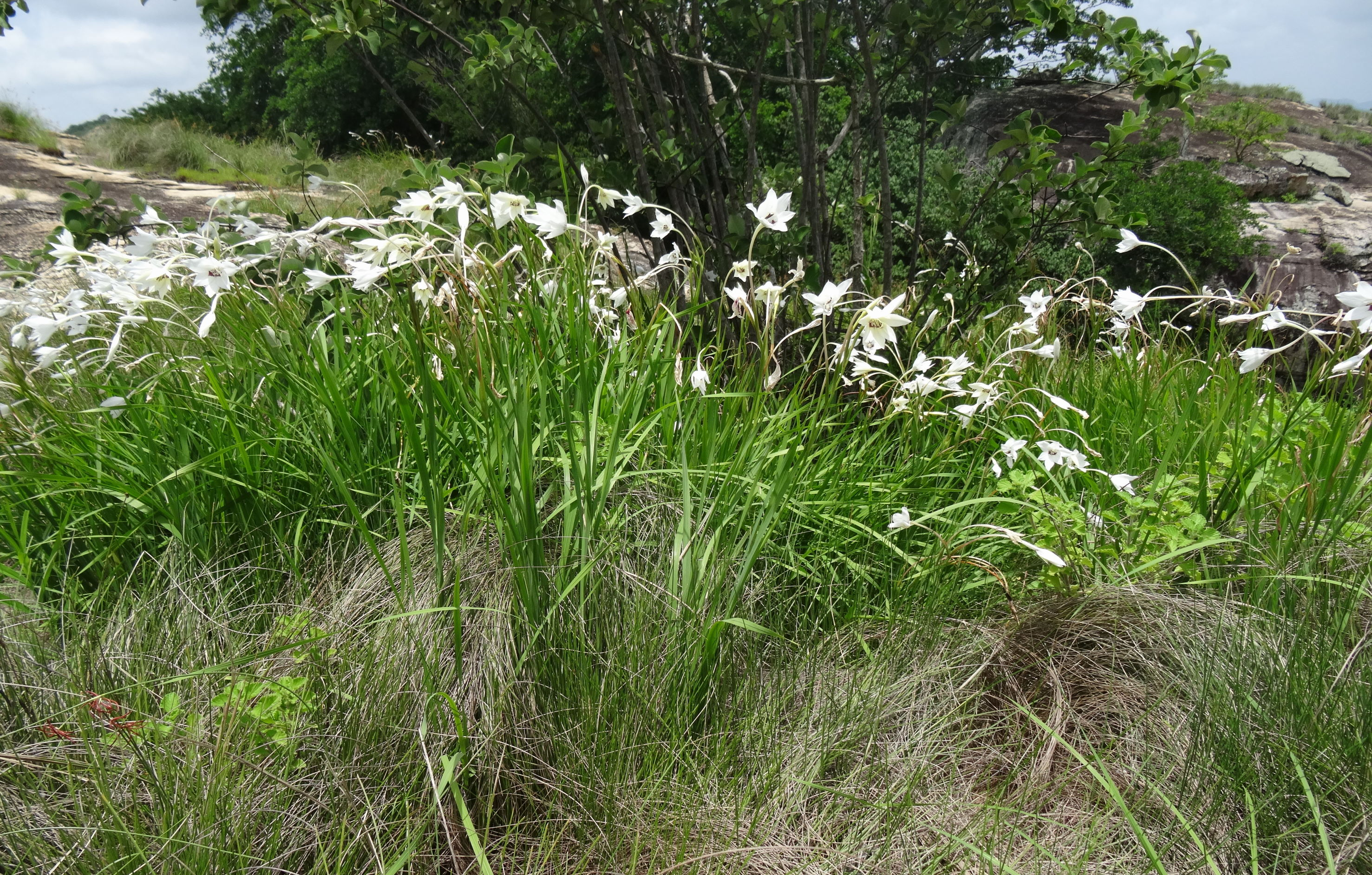
- Gladiolus murielae in its natural environment near Montepuez, Mozambique

Scientific classification
- Kingdom: Plantae
- Clade: Embryophytes
- Clade: Tracheophytes
- Clade: Angiosperms
- Clade: Monocots
- Order: Asparagales
- Family: Iridaceae
- Genus: Gladiolus
- Species: G. murielae

Binomial name
- Gladiolus murielae Kelway

Synonyms
- Acidanthera bicolor Hochst.; Acidanthera murielae (Kelway) Hoog; Gladiolus callianthus Marais; Ixia quartiniana A.Rich.; Sphaerospora gigantea Klatt, nom. illeg. superfl.

= Gladiolus murielae =

Species of flowering plant

Gladiolus murielae is a species of flowering plant in the family Iridaceae, native to eastern Africa, from Ethiopia to Mozambique. It has been given a number of English names, including Abyssinian gladiolus, fragrant gladiolus, peacock gladiolus, and peacock orchid. It was formerly placed in the genus Acidanthera as Acidanthera bicolor.

It is a cormous perennial growing to 70–100 cm (28–39 in) tall, with linear leaves, and in late summer numerous fragrant white flowers with a maroon (occasionally orange) blotch in the throat, on slender nodding stems. Widely cultivated, it is a common subject in western and southern European gardens, where the corms are lifted every year and stored in frost-free conditions.

This plant has gained the Royal Horticultural Society's Award of Garden Merit.

== Pollination ==
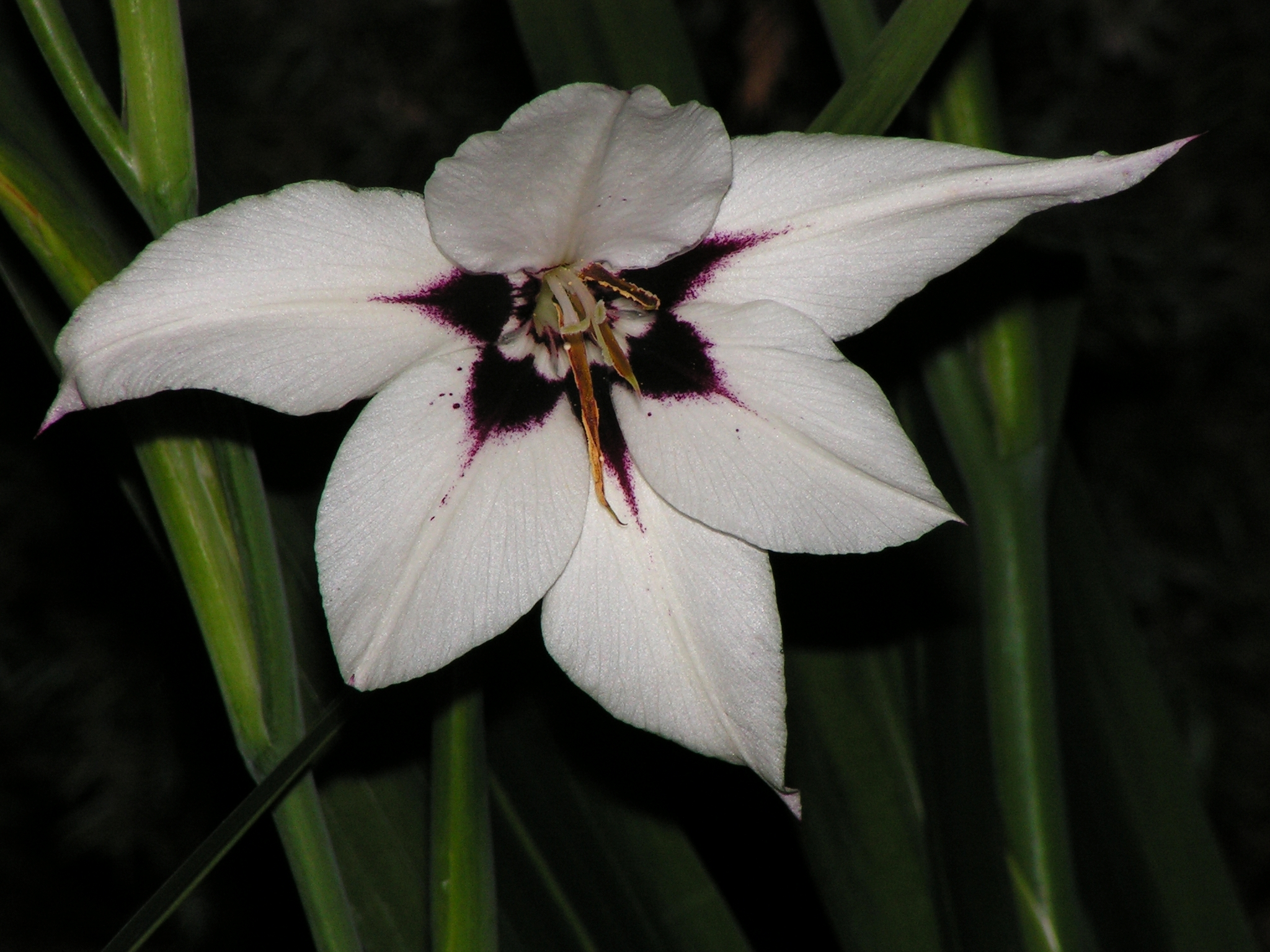
Flower close-up

The long floral tube, the creamy white flowers, the marks in the throat and the sweet fragrance are typical for gladioluses that in their natural environment are pollinated by sphinx moths with a long proboscis.

== Taxonomy ==
The species was first described as Acidanthera bicolor by Christian Hochstetter in 1844. In 1973, Wessel Marais included the genus Acidanthera in Gladiolus. As the name Gladiolus bicolor had already been published by Carl Peter Thunberg in 1784, for a taxon now considered to be the same as Sparaxis villosa, and in 1877 again by John Gilbert Baker, as a nomen novum for Gladiolus luteus Klatt non Lam., a taxon now considered to be the same as Gladiolus virescens, Marais needed another name. He chose to call the species Gladiolus callianthus. Marais was apparently unaware that nurseryman James Kelway had already validly published the name Gladiolus murielae in 1932, so that the name G. callianthus was superfluous. Kelway published the name in The Gardeners' Chronicle, a horticultural magazine mostly overlooked by botanists. The epithet murielae honours Muriel Erskine; her husband E.N. Erskine had collected the specimen in Ethiopia on which Kelway based the name.

The species is often still offered for sale under the name Acidanthera bicolor, sometimes with murielae added as an infraspecific name, or even as the cultivar name 'Murielae'.
