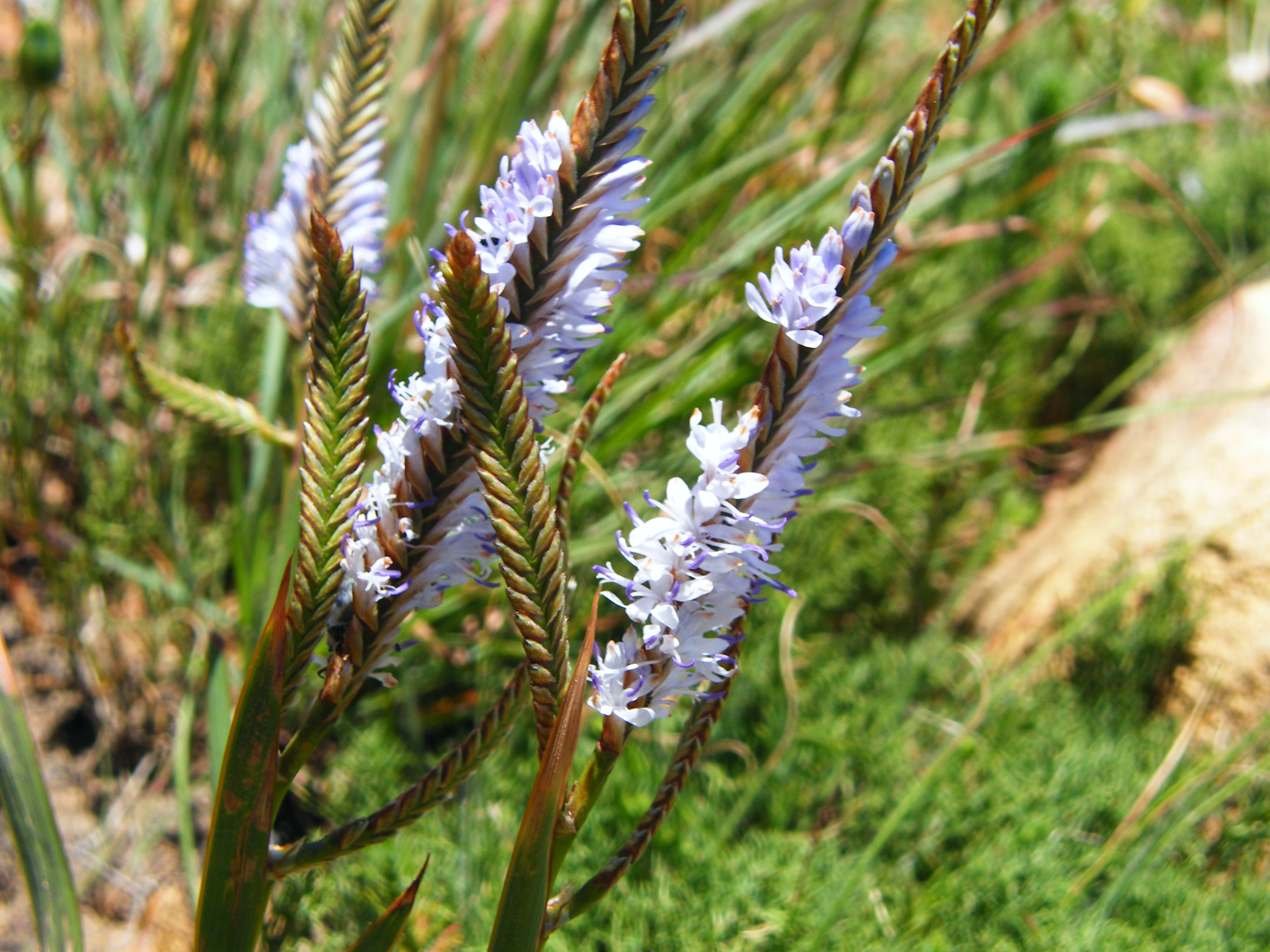

Scientific classification
- Kingdom: Plantae
- Clade: Tracheophytes
- Clade: Angiosperms
- Clade: Monocots
- Order: Asparagales
- Family: Iridaceae
- Genus: Micranthus
- Species: M. alopecuroides

Binomial name
- Micranthus alopecuroides (L.) Rothm., (1827)

Synonyms
- Antholyza lucidior Vahl; Gladiolus alopecuroides L.; Gladiolus minutiflorus Schrank; Gladiolus plantagineus Pers.; Ixia alopecuroides (L.) L.f.; Paulomagnusia alopecuroides (L.) Kuntze; Watsonia compacta G.Lodd.; Watsonia plantaginea Ker Gawl.

= Micranthus alopecuroides =

Species of flowering plant

Micranthus alopecuroides is a perennial geophyte belonging to the genus Micranthus. The species is endemic to the Western Cape.
