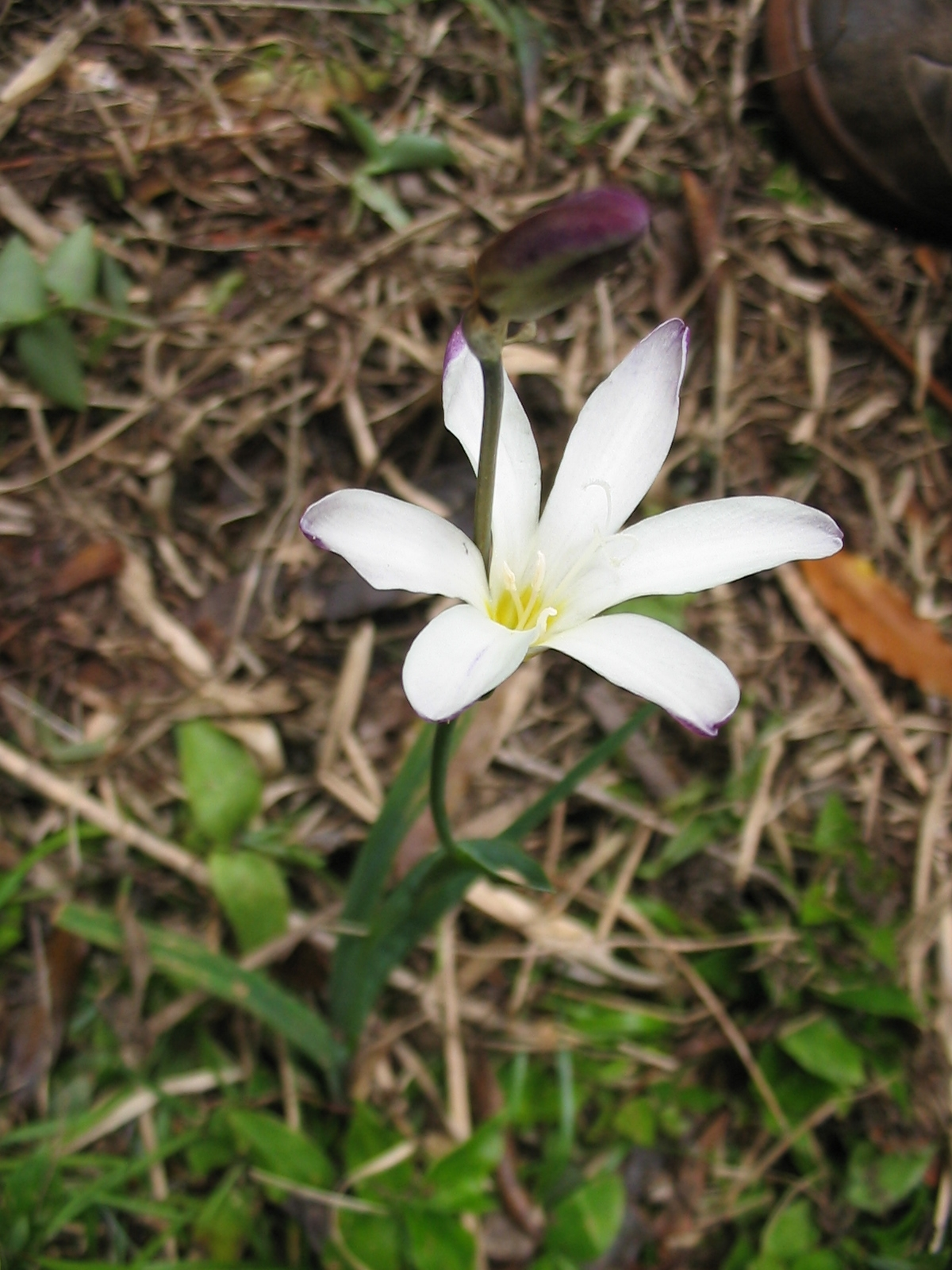

Scientific classification
- Kingdom: Plantae
- Clade: Tracheophytes
- Clade: Angiosperms
- Clade: Monocots
- Order: Asparagales
- Family: Iridaceae
- Genus: Sparaxis
- Species: S. bulbifera

Binomial name
- Sparaxis bulbifera (L.) Ker Gawl.

= Sparaxis bulbifera =

Species of flowering plant

Sparaxis bulbifera, commonly known as harlequin flower, is a bulb-forming perennial plant. The species is native to Cape Province in South Africa and naturalised in the Azores and Australia. It grows to between 15 and 60 cm high and has white to cream flowers. This flower is often found growing next to Geissorhiza radians. It has branched stems and lanceolate leaves. It is one of the few species native to sandy, waterlogged soils.

Sparaxis bulbifera is popular in ornamental gardening due to its attractive blooms and resilience. The plant's flowers are noted for their striking appearance and ability to thrive in a variety of soil conditions, making them a favorite among gardeners looking to add a touch of exotic beauty to their landscapes. In addition to its aesthetic appeal, Sparaxis bulbifera plays a role in local ecosystems, providing nectar for various pollinators, including bees and butterflies.
