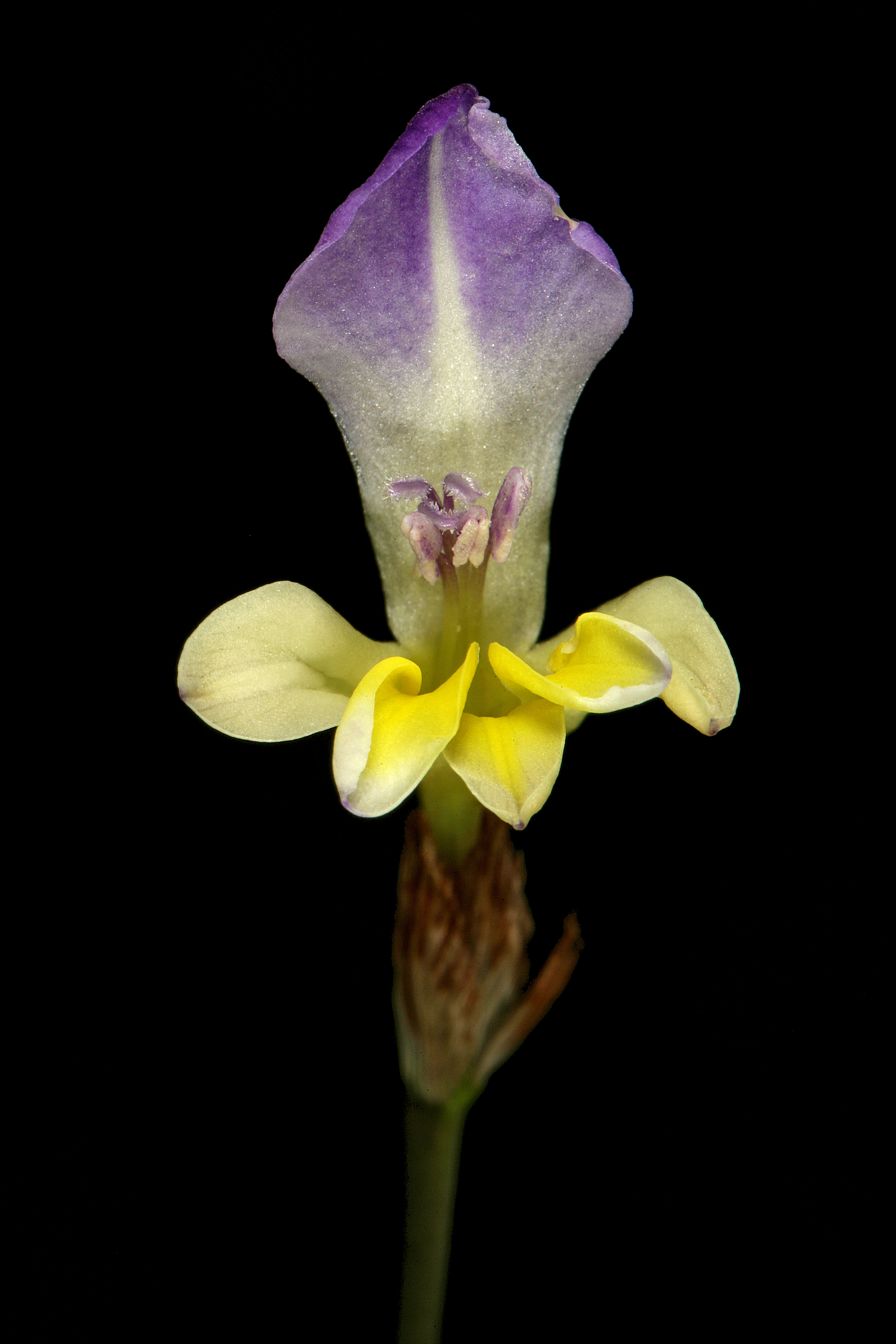

Scientific classification
- Kingdom: Plantae
- Clade: Embryophytes
- Clade: Tracheophytes
- Clade: Angiosperms
- Clade: Monocots
- Order: Asparagales
- Family: Iridaceae
- Genus: Sparaxis
- Species: S. villosa

Binomial name
- Sparaxis villosa (Burm.f.) Goldblatt 1992

= Sparaxis villosa =

Species of flowering plant

Sparaxis villosa is a species of Sparaxis native to the southwestern Cape Provinces of South Africa.
