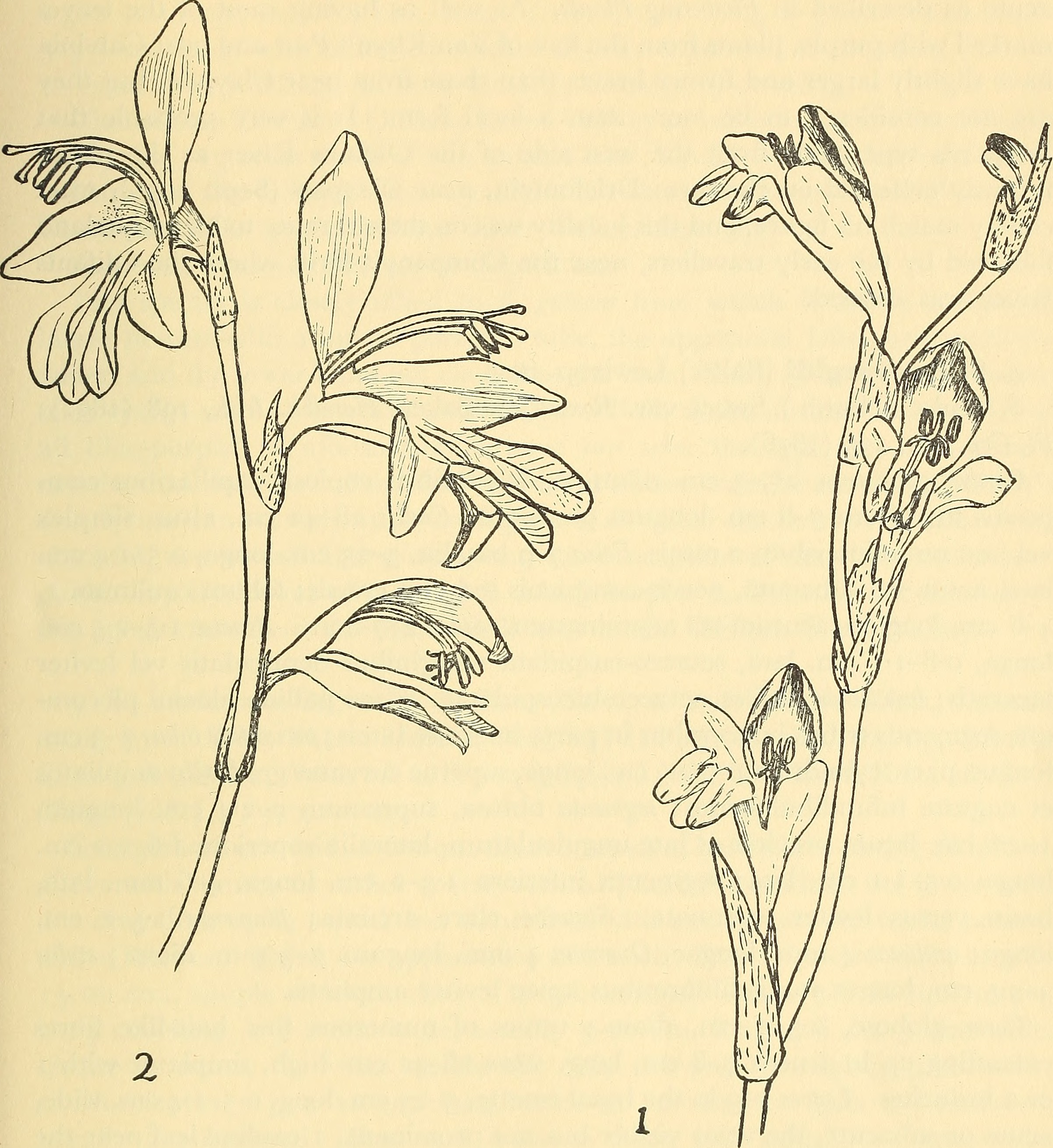

Scientific classification
- Kingdom: Plantae
- Clade: Tracheophytes
- Clade: Angiosperms
- Clade: Monocots
- Order: Asparagales
- Family: Iridaceae
- Genus: Sparaxis
- Species: S. galeata

Binomial name
- Sparaxis galeata Ker Gawl.

Synonyms
- Anactorion galeatum (Ker Gawl.) Raf.; Gladiolus galeatus Jacq.; Synnotia galeata (Ker Gawl.) Sweet

= Sparaxis galeata =

Species of flowering plant

Sparaxis galeata is a perennial plant and geophyte belonging to the genus Sparaxis and is part of the fynbos. The species is endemic to the Northern Cape and the Western Cape and occurs from Calvinia and the Bokkeveldberge to the Nardouwberg near Klawer.
