= Micranthus plantagineus =

Scientific classification
- Kingdom: Plantae
- Clade: Tracheophytes
- Clade: Angiosperms
- Clade: Monocots
- Order: Asparagales
- Family: Iridaceae
- Genus: Micranthus
- Species: M. plantagineus

Binomial name
- Micranthus plantagineus Eckl., (1827)

Synonyms
- Phalangium spicatum Houtt.; Micranthus junceus (Baker) N.E.Br.; Micranthus plantagineus var. junceus Baker; Phalangium spicatum Burm.f.

Species of flowering plant

Micranthus plantagineus is a perennial geophyte belonging to the genus Micranthus. The species is endemic to the Western Cape.
