= Moraea villosa =

Conservation status
- Vulnerable (IUCN 3.1)

Scientific classification
- Kingdom: Plantae
- Clade: Tracheophytes
- Clade: Angiosperms
- Clade: Monocots
- Order: Asparagales
- Family: Iridaceae
- Genus: Moraea
- Species: M. villosa

Binomial name
- Moraea villosa (Ker Gawl.) Ker Gawl.

Synonyms
- Iris villosa Ker Gawl.; Moraea pavonia var. villosa (Ker Gawl.) Baker; Vieusseuxia villosa (Spreng.) Baker

Species of flowering plant

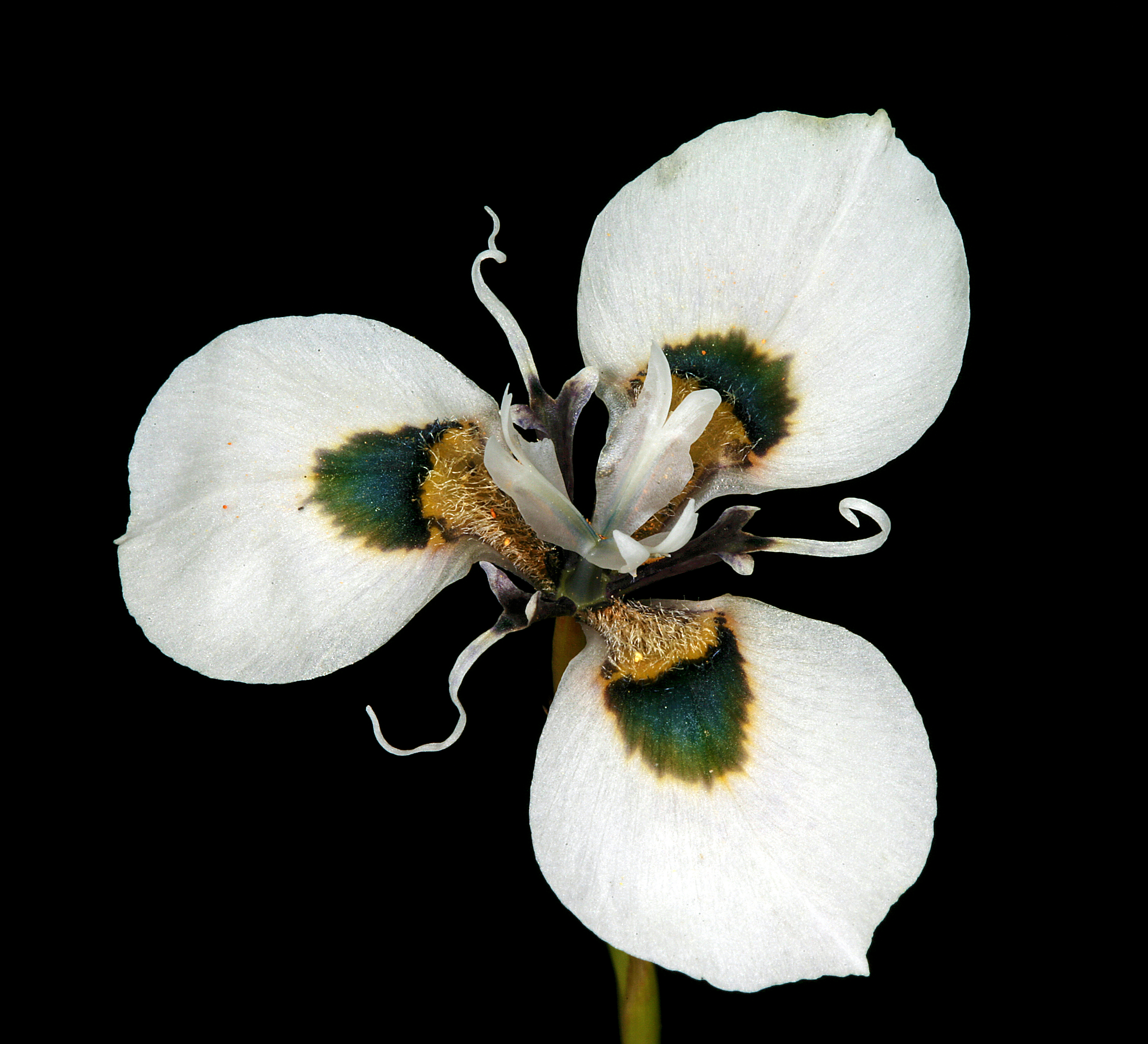
Pale flowered form

Moraea villosa is a species of plant in genus Moraea in the iris family Iridaceae. It is commonly called the peacock moraea, peacock flappie, small owl, or Uiltjie. The up to 7 cm (2.8 in) wide flowers display as many as six colours in a single flower, some of which are truly iridescent. It is native to the Western Cape of South Africa where it was once common but has lost habitat to wheat fields and urban expansion. Some colour forms extend into Namibia. It can be readily cultivated as a garden flower or in pots.
