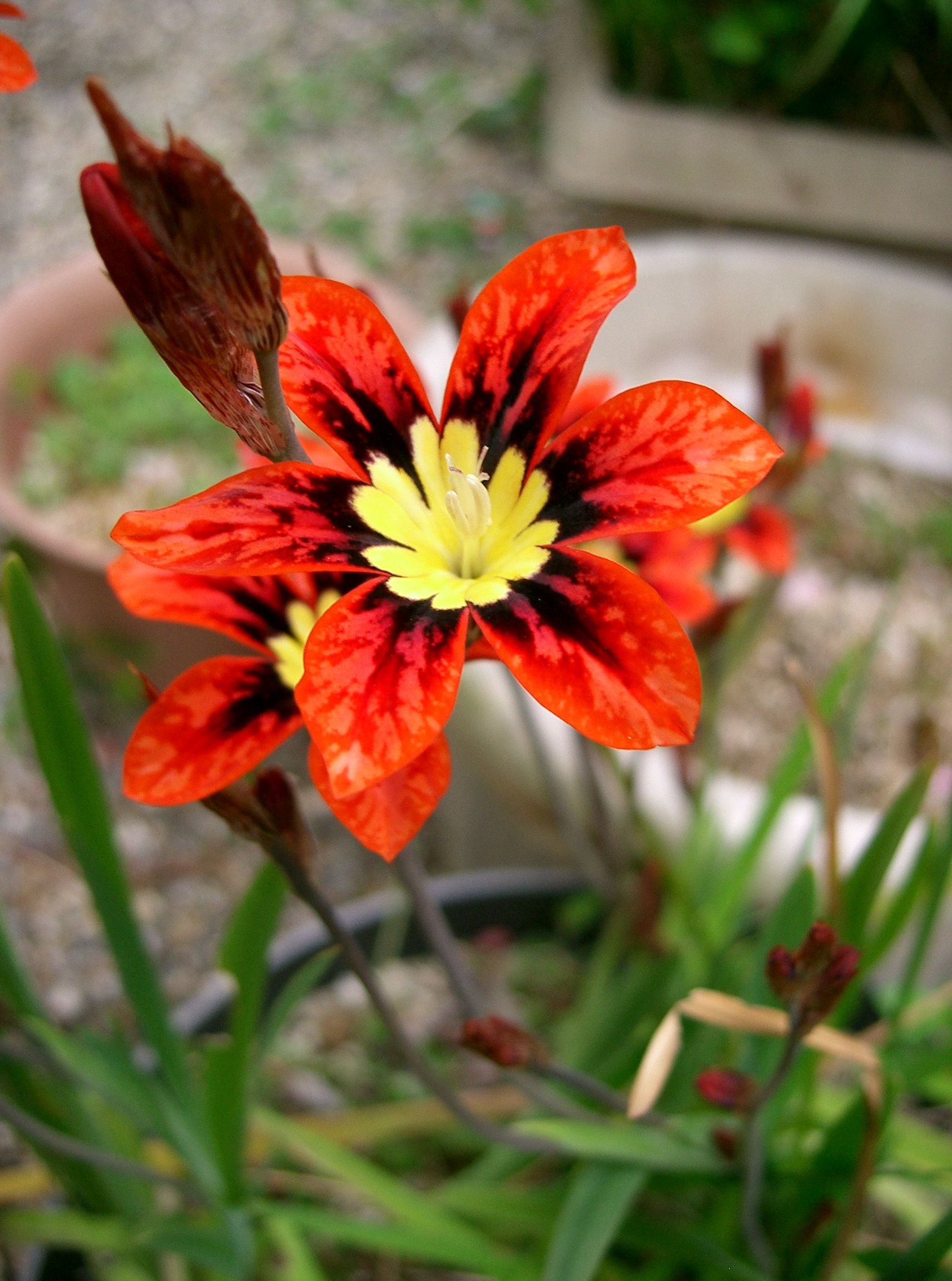

Scientific classification
- Kingdom: Plantae
- Clade: Tracheophytes
- Clade: Angiosperms
- Clade: Monocots
- Order: Asparagales
- Family: Iridaceae
- Genus: Sparaxis
- Species: S. tricolor

Binomial name
- Sparaxis tricolor (Schneev.) Ker Gawl.

Synonyms
- Ixia tricolor Schneev.; Sparaxis blanda Sweet; Sparaxis griffinii Sweet; Sparaxis lineata Sweet; Sparaxis versicolor Sweet; Streptanthera lineata (Sweet) Klatt; Streptanthera tricolor (Schneev.) Klatt

= Sparaxis tricolor =

Species of flowering plant

Sparaxis tricolor, known by the common names wandflower, harlequin flower, and sparaxis, is a bulb-forming perennial plant that grows in well-drained sunny soil. It gained its name from its colorful flowers which are bi- or tri-coloured with a golden centre and a small ring of brown surrounded by another colour.

The plant is native to the northern Bokkeveld Escarpment in the west-central Cape Provinces of South Africa. It is present in California and Australia as an introduced species after having escaped from garden cultivation.
