= John Charles Manning =

South African botanist (born 1962)

- Born: 1962 (age 63–64)
- Scientific career
- Fields: Botany
- Author abbrev. (botany): J.C.Manning

John Charles Manning (born 1962) is a South African botanist based in the Compton Herbarium, South African National Biodiversity Institute, Kirstenbosch, South Africa.

The standard author abbreviation J.C.Manning is used to indicate this person as the author when citing a botanical name.
