= Peter Goldblatt =

South African born American botanist (born 1943)

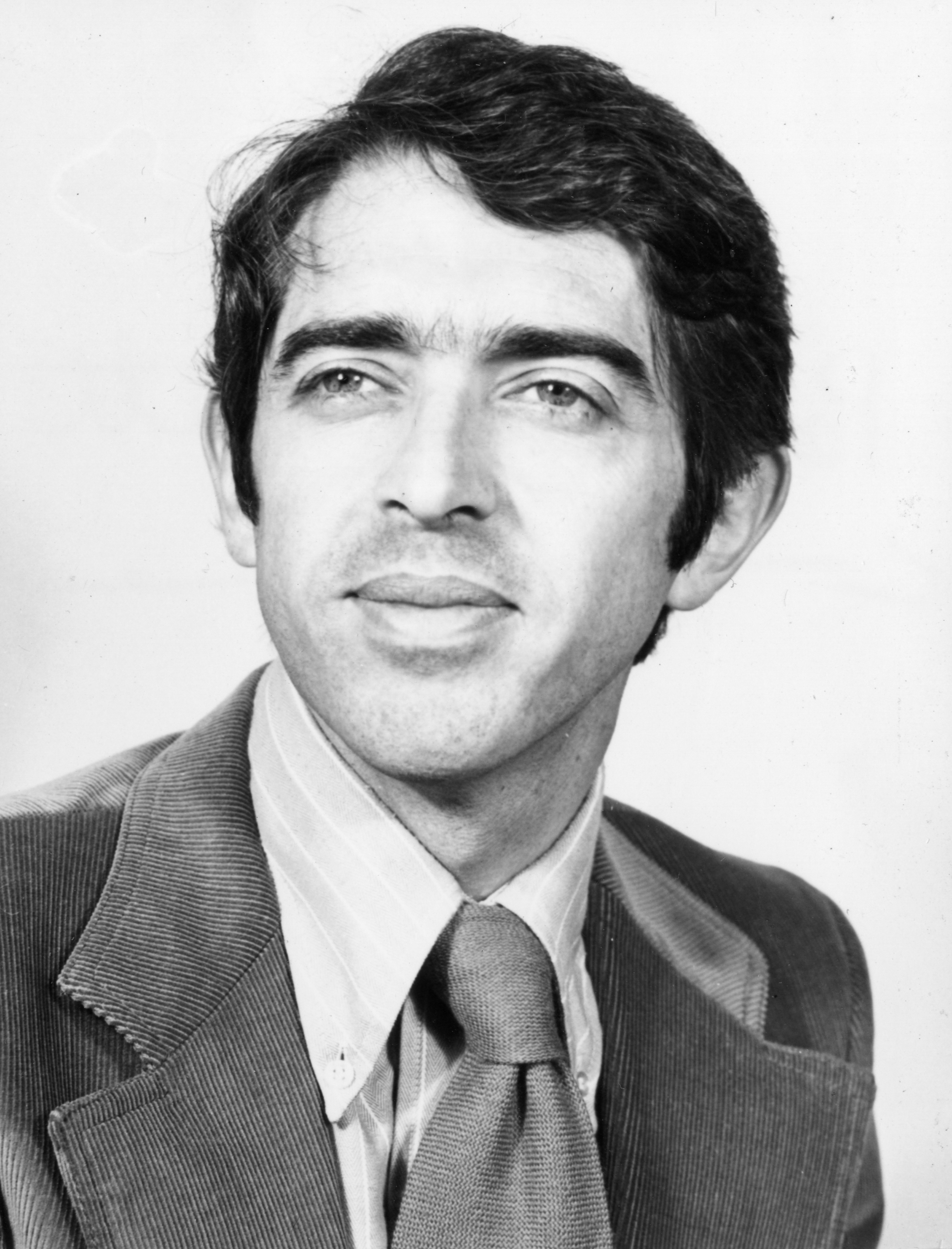
- Born: October 8, 1943 (age 82); Johannesburg, S. Africa
- Citizenship: United States
- Education: University of Cape Town
- Awards: Herbert Medal 1999
- Scientific career
- Fields: Botany
- Workplaces: Missouri Botanical Gardens
- Author abbrev. (botany): Goldblatt

Peter Goldblatt (born 1943) is a South African-born American botanist, working mainly in the United States.

== Life ==
Goldblatt was born in Johannesburg, South Africa on October 8, 1943. His undergraduate studies (B.Sc.) were undertaken at the University of Witwatersrand in Johannesberg (1965–1966), from where he went on to graduate studies at the University of Cape Town, where he received his doctorate in 1970. He held a position as lecturer in botany at Witwatersrand (1967) and then Cape Town (1968–1971) before emigrating to the United States in 1972. In the US he took up a position as a researcher at the Missouri Botanical Gardens, in St. Louis, where he has remained since, holding the position of Senior Curator since 1990. He returned briefly to South Africa in 2006 as a researcher at the Compton Herbarium, South African National Biodiversity Institute, in Cape Town. He has also held appointments at the University of Missouri, as well as the University of Portland, Oregon (2000–2004). He obtained US citizenship in 1978.

== Work ==
Peter Goldblatt started his career as a plant collector in 1962, and worked extensively in Cape Province, but also in other regions of Africa, Madagascar, the United States, Greece, Italy, Israel, Turkey and Iran, having collected thousands of specimens. His interests lie in systematic taxonomy. One of his main research interests has been the cytology and taxonomy of the Iridaceae of Africa. A member of several botanical societies, he was also General Secretary (1982–1985) of the Association for the Taxonomic Study of Tropical African Flora.

In 1999 he was awarded the International Bulb Society's Herbert Medal for his contributions to the knowledge of bulbous plants. In 2021 he was awarded the Foster Memorial Plaque for his contributions to the genus Iris.

== Selected publications ==
Goldblatt has published a large number of scientific publications, and several books (see C.V.).

Books

- A revision of the genera Lapeirousia Pourret and Anomatheca Ker in the winter rainfall region of South Africa (1972)
- The Moraeas of Southern Africa (Annals of Kirstenbosch Botanic Gardens) (1996)
- The Genus Watsonia: A Systematic Monograph (Annals of Kirstenbosch Botanic Gardens) (1989, 1995)
- The Woody Iridaceae: Systematics, Biology and Evolution of Nivenia, Klattia and Witsenia. Timber Press, Portland, Oregon (1993).
- Gladiolus in Tropical Africa: Systematics, Biology and Evolution (1996, 2003)
- Wildflowers of the Fairest Cape (2000)
- Cape plants: A conspectus of the Cape flora of South Africa (Strelitzia) (2000)
- The Woody Iridaceae: Nivenia, Klattia & Witsenia: Systematics, Biology & Evolution (2003)The Woody Iridaceae
- The Iris Family: Natural History and Classification (2008)
- A Revision of the Southern African Genus Babiana, Iridaceae: Crocoideae

Coauthored with John Charles Manning:

- Gladiolus in Southern Africa: Systematics, Biology, and Evolution. Fernwood Press, Cape Town. (1998)
- The Complete Color Encyclopedia of Cape Bulbs (2002)
- Crocosmia and Chasmanthe (Royal Horticultural Society Plant Collector Guide) (2004).
- Manning, John C.; Goldblatt, Peter (2010). Botany and horticulture of the genus Freesia (Iridaceae). Strelitzia vol. 27. Pretoria: South African National Biodiversity Institute, SANBI. ISBN 978-1-919976-58-7.

Book chapters

- Goldblatt, P. (1995). The status of R. Dahlgren's orders Liliales and Melanthiales. pp. 181–200. In Rudall et al. (1995)
- Iridaceae. In K. Kubitzki (editor), Families and Genera of Flowering Plants volume 2: 295–335. (1998).

Articles

- Goldblatt, Peter (1972). "Chromosome cytology in relation to classification in Nerine and Brunsvigia (Amaryllidaceae)". South African Journal of Botany. 38: 261–275.
- Goldblatt, Peter (1986). "Systematics and relationships of the bigeneric Pacific family Campynemataceae (Liliales)". Bulletin du Muséum National d'Histoire Naturelle, Section B. 8: 117–132.
- Manning, J.C.; Goldblatt, P.; Fay, M.F. (2004). "A revised generic synopsis of Hyacintheaceae in sub-Saharan Africa, based on molecular evidence, including new combinations and the new tribe Pseudoprospereae". Edinburgh Journal of Botany. 60 (3): 533–568. doi:10.1017/S0960428603000404. S2CID 86097586.
- Manning, J.C.; Forest, F.; Devey, D.S.; Fay, M.F.; Goldblatt, P. (February 2009). "A molecular phylogeny and a revised classification of Ornithogaloideae (Hyacinthaceae) based on an analysis of four placid DNA regions". Taxon. 58 (1): 77–107. doi:10.1002/tax.581011. JSTOR 27756826.

== Legacy ==
A number of taxa have been named in his honour, including;

- Gladiolus goldblattianus Geerinck
- Villarsia goldblattiana Ornduff

The International Plant Names Index lists over 1,300 taxa named by him, particularly from the Iridaceae, Scilloideae including Hyacintheae, Asteraceae and Polygalaceae. e.g.

- Campynemanthe neocaledonica (Rendle) Goldblatt
- Campynemanthe parva Goldblatt

== Bibliography ==
- Goldblatt, Peter. "Curriculum vitae" (PDF).
- "Peter Goldblatt". Missouri Botanical Garden.
- Gunn, Mary; Codd, L. E. (1981). Botanical exploration of southern Africa: an illustrated history of early botanical literature on the Cape flora, biographical accounts of the leading plant collectors and their activities in southern Africa from the days of the East India company until modern times. Cape Town: A. A. Balkema. ISBN 978-0-86961-129-6.
- Rudall, P.J.; Cribb, P.J.; Cutler, D.F.; Humphries, C.J., eds. (1995). Monocotyledons: systematics and evolution (Proceedings of the International Symposium on Monocotyledons: Systematics and Evolution, Kew 1993). Kew: Royal Botanic Gardens. ISBN 978-0-947643-85-0. Archived from the original on 5 January 2014.
- "Peter Goldblatt". Timber Press.
- "Goldblatt, Peter". Harvard University Herbaria & Libraries: Index of Botanists. 2015.
- "Tropicos". Missouri Botanical Garden. 2015.
