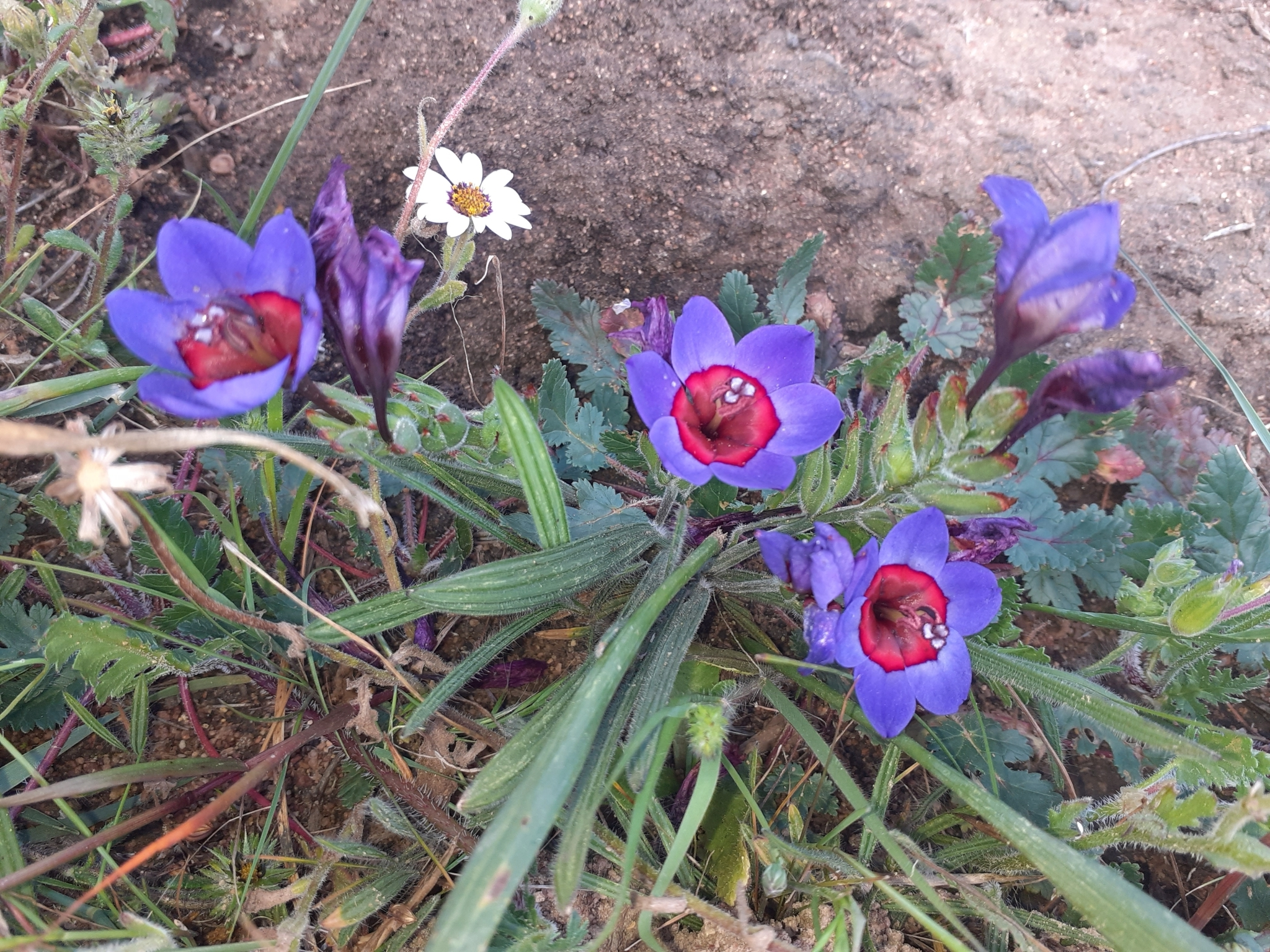

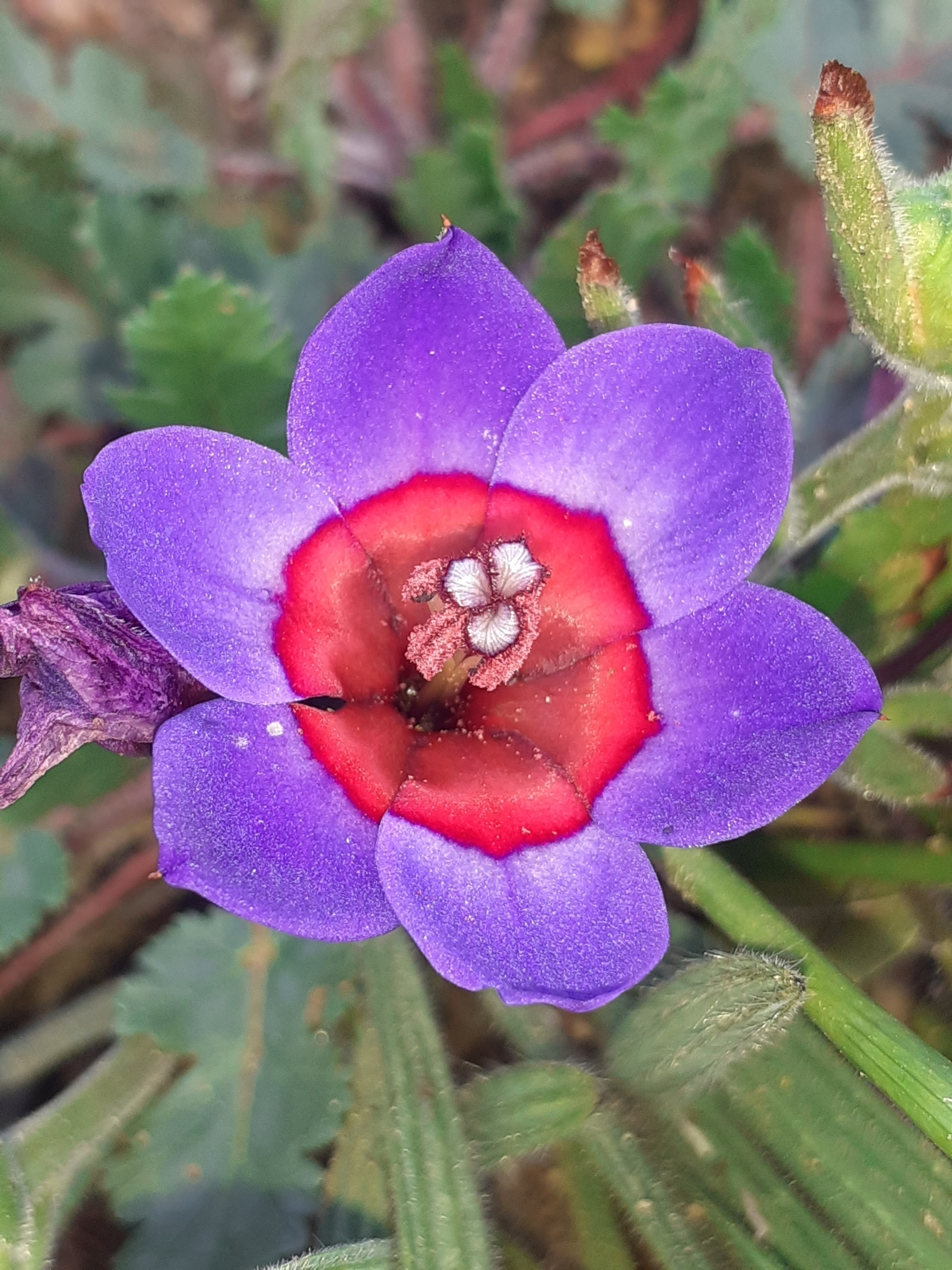

Scientific classification
- Kingdom: Plantae
- Clade: Embryophytes
- Clade: Tracheophytes
- Clade: Angiosperms
- Clade: Monocots
- Order: Asparagales
- Family: Iridaceae
- Genus: Babiana
- Species: B. rubrocyanea

Binomial name
- Babiana rubrocyanea (Jacq.) Ker-Gawl.

Synonyms
- Ixia rubrocyanea Jacq.; Acaste venusta Salisb.

= Babiana rubrocyanea =

Species of flowering plant

Babiana rubrocyanea is a perennial geophyte of 5–15 cm (2.0–5.9 in) high, with entire, lance-shaped, hairy, pleated leaves and flowers that have a narrowly funnel-shaped tube at their base and six free tepal lobes at the top that form a wide cup that is purplish blue with a sharply defined carmine red centre. It can be found in a small area of the Western Cape province of South Africa. Flowers can be found from August to the middle of September. It is called blue-and-red babiana in English and rooibloubobbejaantjie in Afrikaans.

== Description ==
Rooibloubobbejaantjie is a perennial geophyte of 5–15 cm (2.0–5.9 in) high that appears above the ground during winter and spring with leaves and flowers. The leaves and stems are shed in anticipation of the dry and hot summer, when the plants survive underground with their corms. These corms are enveloped in a multi-layered fibrous tunic. From the corm's top emerges a branching stem that is strongly flexed outward, circular in cross section and hairy. The base of the stem is surrounded by a fibrous collar. The leaves consist of a narrow sheath partially enclosing the sheaths of other leaves and the stem, and a laterally compressed blade with a right and left surface, rather than an upper and lower surface. The axils of the sheath and blade are at a distinct angle with each other. The leaf blades are pleated, lance-shaped and hairy.

The inflorescence consists of several flowers, each of which is enclosed by two bracts at its base. These bracts are 18–30 mm (0.71–1.18 in) long, velvety, green with a brown tip. The inner bract is slightly shorter than the outer and split along the middle all the way to the base. The flowers of B. rubrocyanea have an almost star-symmetrical dark blue perianth, paler around a carmine-coloured heart that consists of 6 tepals that are merged into a narrowly funnel-shaped tube of 15–20 mm (0.59–0.79 in) long at their base but free at the top where the 20–24 mm (0.79–0.94 in) long lobes form a wide cup. The three stamens consist of 10–13 mm (0.39–0.51 in) long filaments that are clustered opposite the stem and curve over de lower tepal lobe, and are topped by reddish brown anthers of 6–7 mm (0.24–0.28 in) long. This illustrates the fact that the flowers are rotated 180°, a rare trait that only occurs in three other Babiana species. The centre at the base of the flower is occupied by the ovary that is hairy above the base and is topped by the style that branches midlength of the anthers into three short arms with broad, flattened tips.

=== Differences with similar species ===
B. regia also has deep blue flowers with a carmine red centre and reddish brown anthers, but its stamens are symmetrically arranged in the centre of the flower around a style that branches about 2 mm below the anthers and has slender style branches, as well as stiffer and more roughly hairy leaves.

The flowers of Geissorhiza eurystigma, G. mathewsii, G. monanthos and G. radians are very much alike those of rooibloubobbejaantjie, but the leaves are hairless and ribbed but not pleated, there is just one green and undivided bract per flower, the seeds are not smooth and shiny and the corms are irregular in shape and encased in a woody tunic.

== Taxonomy ==
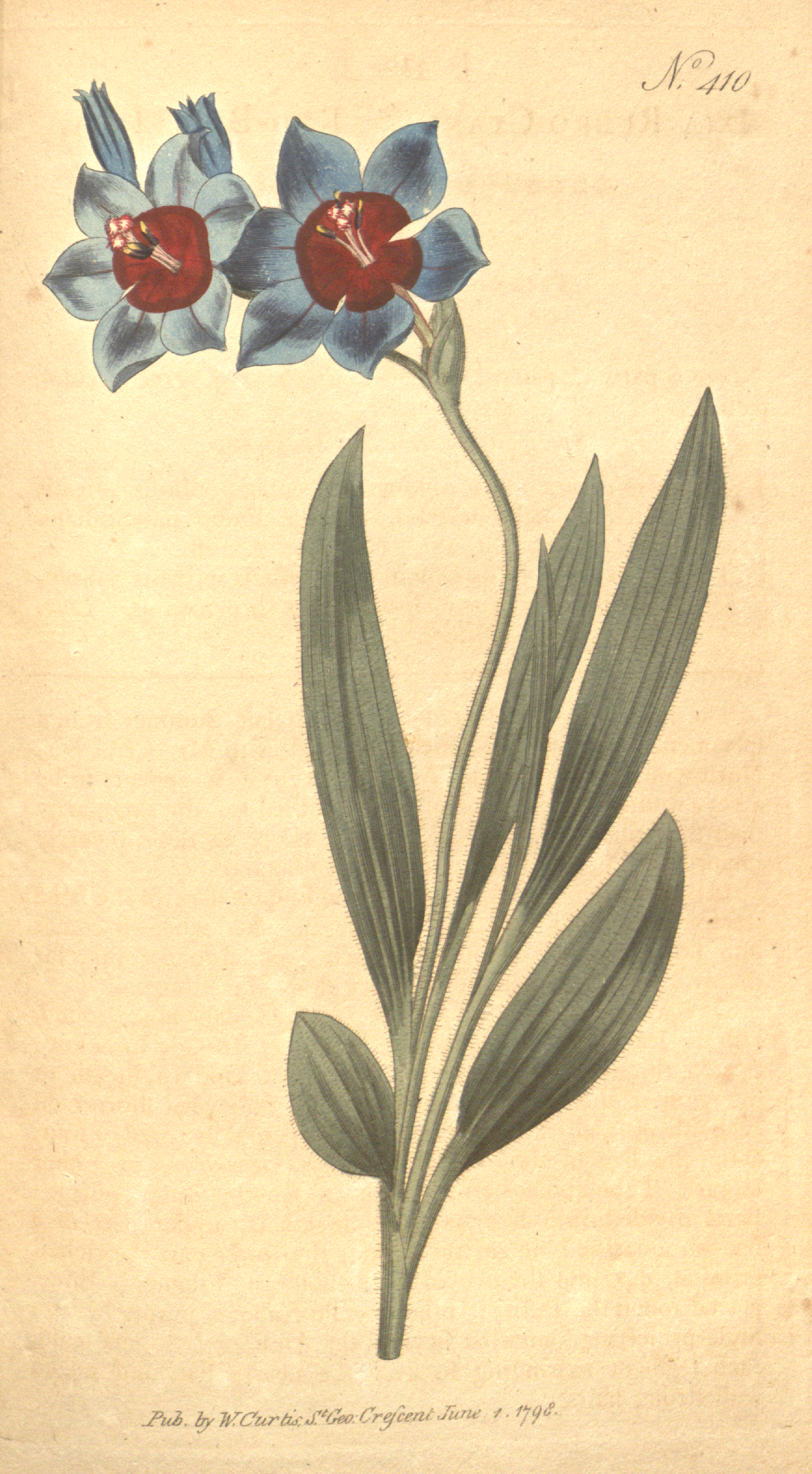
William Curtis, The Botanical Magazine, Volume 12, 1798

Rooibloubobbejaantjie was first described by Nikolaus Joseph von Jacquin in 1791, who named it Ixia rubrocyanea. John Bellenden Ker Gawler, who had proposed to use the genus name Babiana for the species of bobbejaantjie in 1802, reassigned it to his new genus and created the new combination B. rubrocyanea in 1804. In 1812 Richard Anthony Salisbury coined the name Acaste venusta for the same plant, without providing a description however, which is therefore an illegitimate as well as a superfluous name.

== Distribution, ecology and conservation ==
Rooibloubobbejaantjie can only be found on renosterveld in the coastal region of the Western Cape province of South Africa in the vicinity of Darling. Monkey beetles and the horsefly Philoliche atricornis have been seen to visit the flowers. It grows in Swartland Alluvium Renosterveld and Swartland Granite Renosterveld on shallow alluvial sand overlaying clay that is damp during the winter. Over 80% of the natural habitat of this species was lost due to agricultural development, leaving only a few small and isolated patches. The ongoing urban expansion around Darling is a further threat, as well as competition by invasive alien grass species and heavy grazing. Finally, these renosterveld fragments are seldomly burnt, which is a necessity to keep populations healthy. B. rubrocyanea is therefore considered an endangered species.
