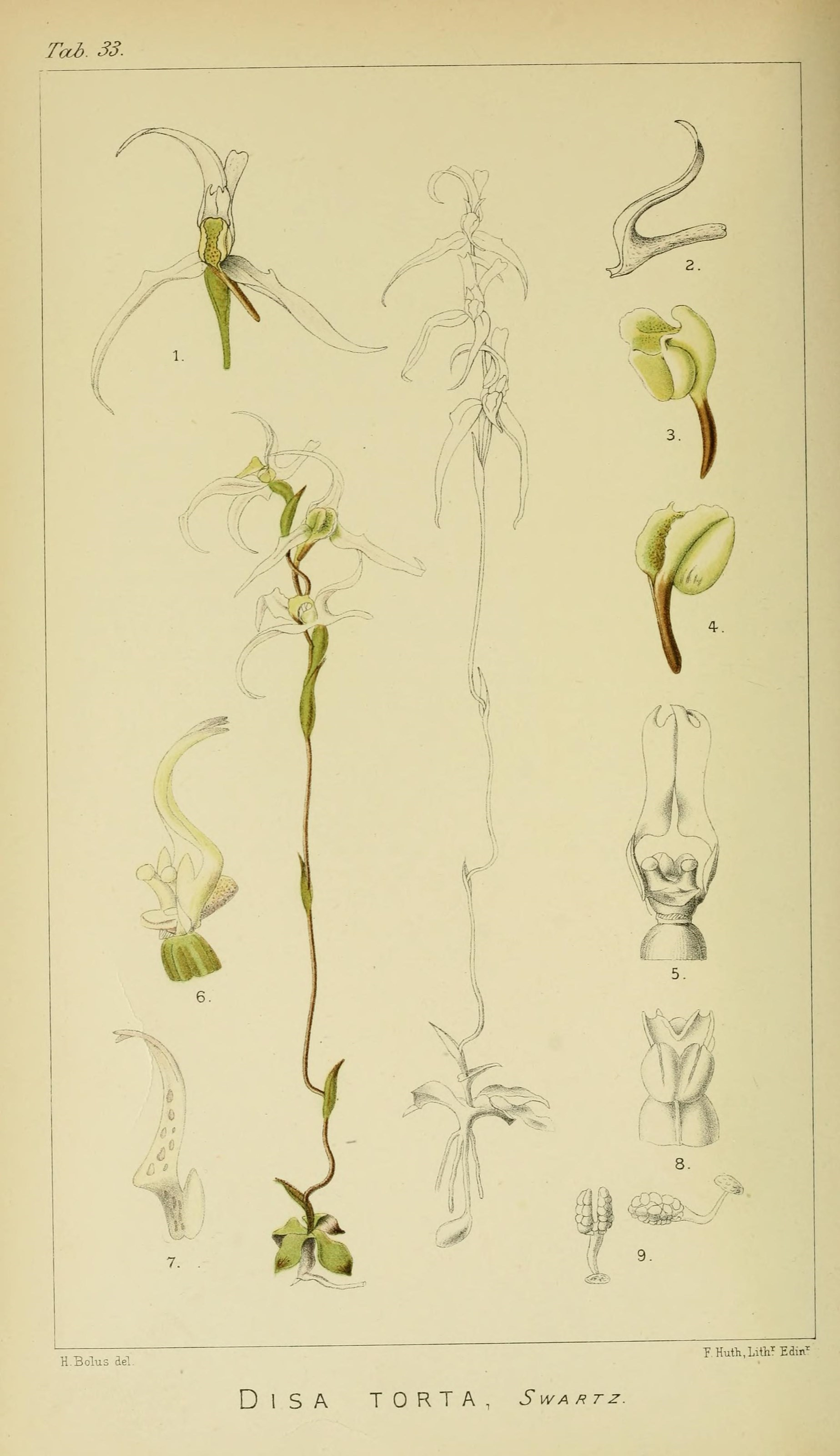

Scientific classification
- Kingdom: Plantae
- Clade: Tracheophytes
- Clade: Angiosperms
- Clade: Monocots
- Order: Asparagales
- Family: Orchidaceae
- Subfamily: Orchidoideae
- Genus: Disa
- Species: D. biflora

Binomial name
- Disa biflora (L.f.) Druce

Synonyms
- Disa satyrioides Bytebier; Disa torta (Thunb.) Sw.; Gamaria cornuta (L.) Raf.; Orchis biflora L.; Orchis flexicaulis L.f.; Orchis satyrioides L.; Satyrium cornutum L.; Satyrium tortum Thunb.; Schizodium arcuatum Lindl.; Schizodium biflorum (L.) T.Durand & Schinz; Schizodium cornutum (L.) Schltr.; Schizodium satyrioides (L.) Garay; Schizodium tortum (Thunb.) Steud.

= Disa biflora =

Species of flowering plant

Disa biflora is a perennial plant and geophyte belonging to the genus Disa and is part of the fynbos. The plant is endemic to the Northern Cape and the Western Cape and occurs from Cape Hangklip to Nieuwoudtville. The plant is extinct on the Cape Peninsula.
