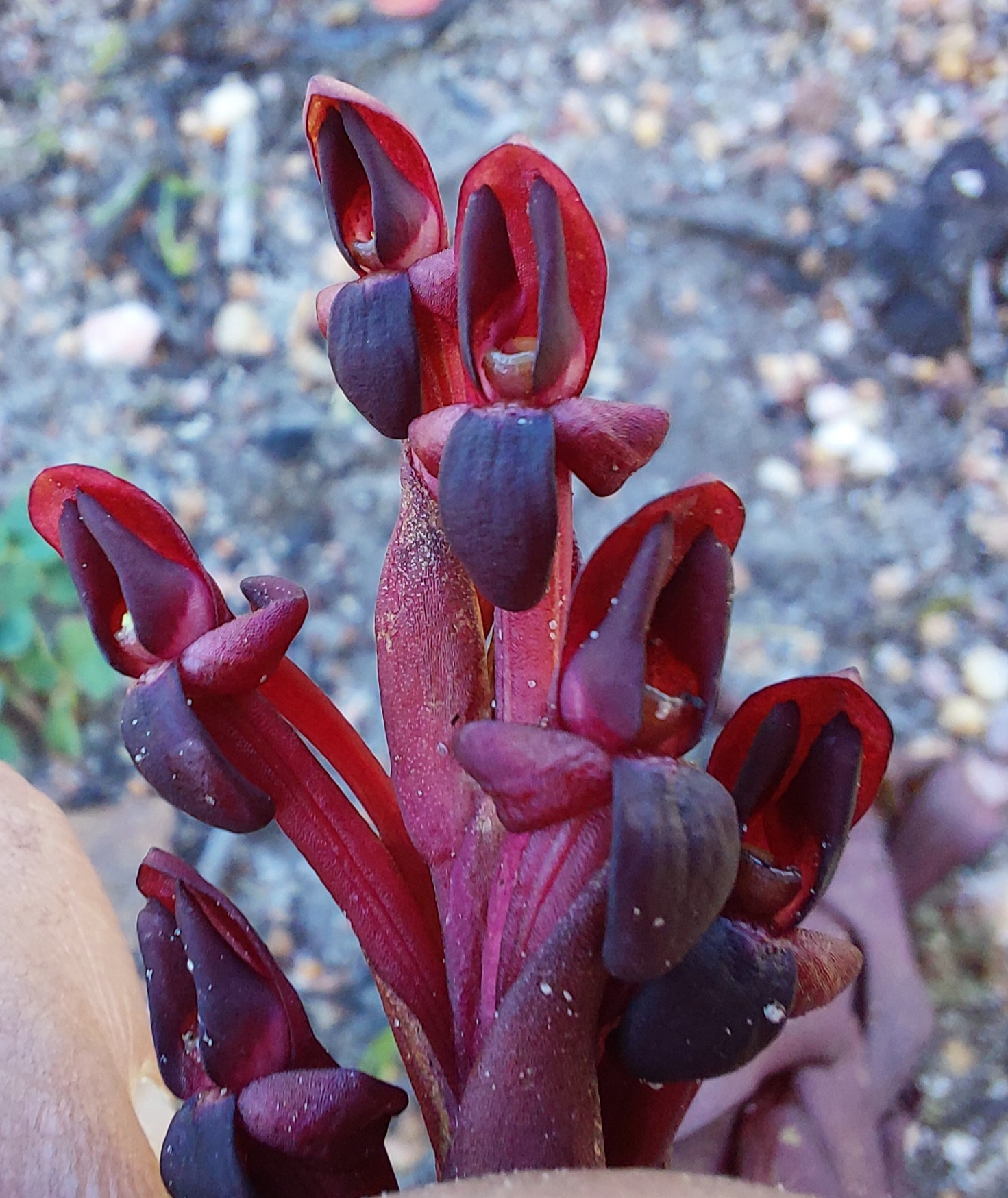

Scientific classification
- Kingdom: Plantae
- Clade: Tracheophytes
- Clade: Angiosperms
- Clade: Monocots
- Order: Asparagales
- Family: Orchidaceae
- Subfamily: Orchidoideae
- Genus: Disa
- Species: D. atrorubens

Binomial name
- Disa atrorubens Schltr.

Synonyms
- Monadenia atrorubens (Schltr.) Rolfe

= Disa atrorubens =

Species of flowering plant

Disa atrorubens is a perennial plant and geophyte belonging to the genus Disa and is part of the fynbos. The species is endemic to the Northern Cape and the Western Cape. It occurs from the Cape Peninsula and Cape Hangklip to Nieuwoudtville. The plant flowers only after wildfires and is threatened by development, crop cultivation and invasive plants.
