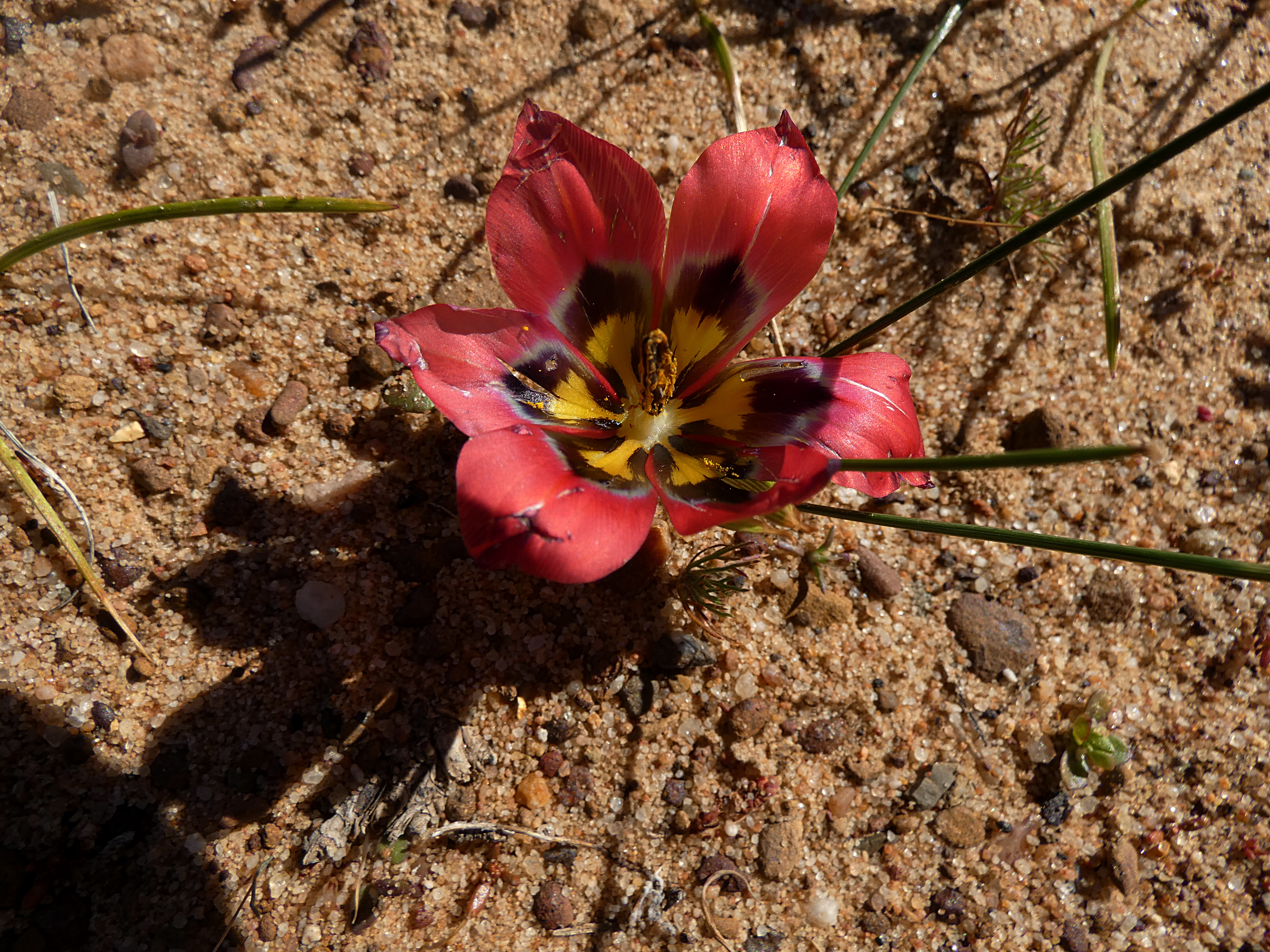

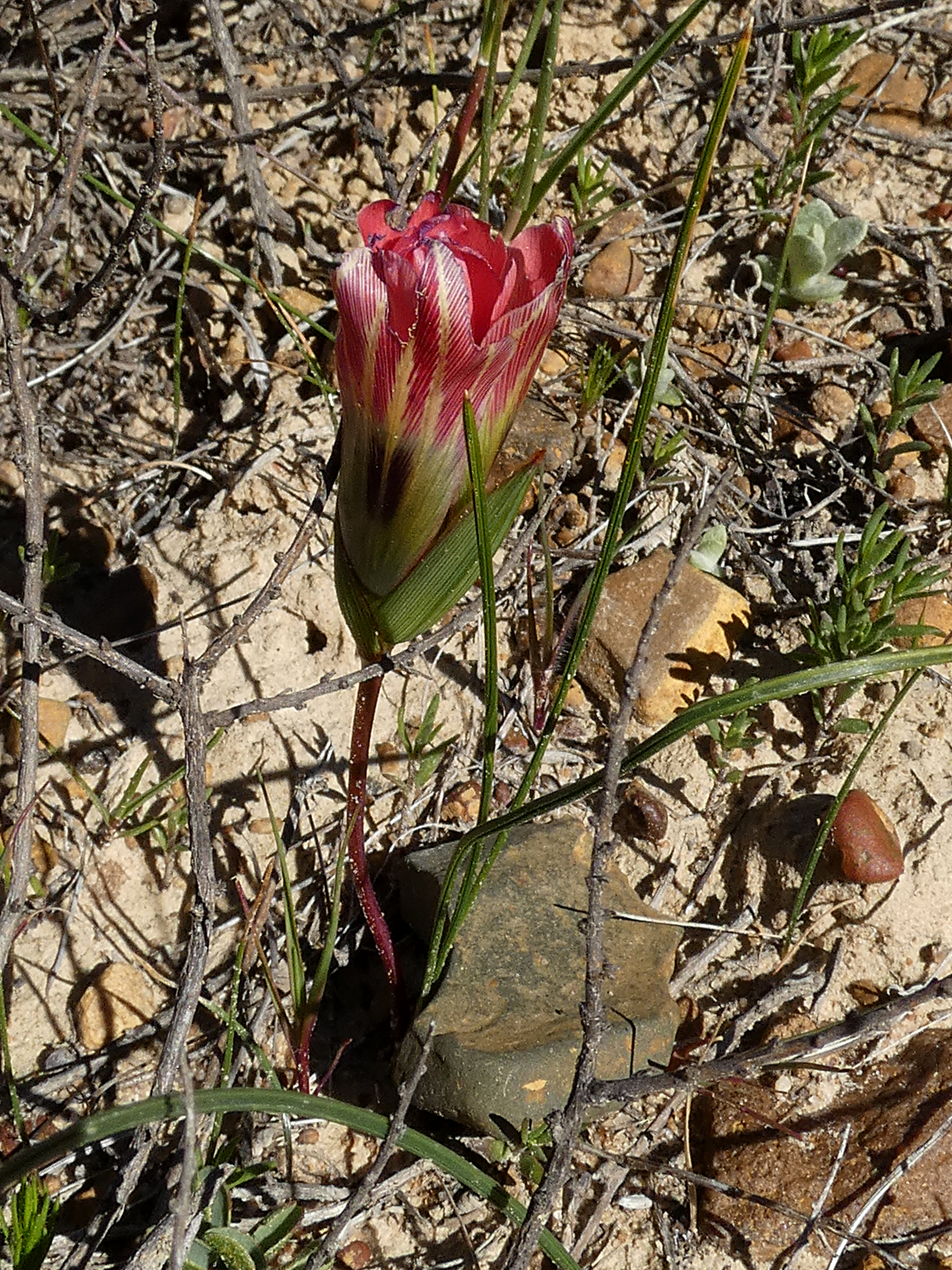

Scientific classification
- Kingdom: Plantae
- Clade: Tracheophytes
- Clade: Angiosperms
- Clade: Monocots
- Order: Asparagales
- Family: Iridaceae
- Genus: Romulea
- Species: R. sabulosa

Binomial name
- Romulea sabulosa Schltr. ex Bég.

= Romulea sabulosa =

Species of flowering plant

Romulea sabulosa is a perennial geophyte that is assigned to the family Iridaceae. It has a few grooved thread-like leaves, and relatively large burgundy red trimerous flowers, reminiscent of crocus flowers, with yellow to light greenish with black markings and stamens with light green free filaments. It only occurs on sandy clay on renosterveld west of Nieuwoudtville in the Northern Cape province South Africa. It is called satynblom in Afrikaans.

== Description ==
Romulea sabulosa is a low to medium height perennial geophyte of 12–40 cm (4.7–15.7 in) high, that has a subterranean stem, that develops from a corm with a rounded base that is wrapped in a brown tunic with curved pointed teeth. The three to five thread-like leaves emerge directly from the soil, are about 1 mm (0.039 in) in diameter and have four grooves along their lengths. Over a season, one to four flowers may develop per corm. Each flower is subtended by two bracts that have a transparent, often brownish margin. The outer bract mostly has one keel on its upper surface and the transparent margin is narrow, while the inner bract has two keels and the papery margin is wider. The scentless, trimerous flower itself is dark red, sometimes pink, and has black blotches in a creamy green cup. The tepals that are fused in a tube at their base are inverted egg-shaped with a slightly indented tip 2½–4 cm (1–1.6 in) long. The outer tepals have a light yellow feathered stripes. The stamens consist of 3–5 mm (0.12–0.20 in) long free filaments topped by anthers of 8–12 mm (0.31–0.47 in) long. The stalk supporting the ripe fruit remains more or less erect. Romulea sabulosa flowers can be found from July till September.

=== Differences with related species ===
Romulea sabulosa has slender, tapering, mostly pale green filaments, while R. monadelpha as short, oblong, black filaments that are pressed together or fused. The flower stalk of R. sabulosa is slender, more or less circular in cross section and does not curve when the fruit is ripe, but in R. monadelpha the flower stem is stout and has one flattened side while it spreads out when the fruit is ripe. The species occur in the same area near Nieuwoudtville, but have a different habitat: R. sabulosa occurs only on a light sandy clay known as tillite, while R. monadelpha grows on heavy dolerite clay.

== Taxonomy ==
Romulea sabulosa was described by the German botanist Rudolf Schlechter in 1907.

== Distribution, habitat and ecology ==
Romulea sabulosa is limited to the Bokkeveld plateau along the escarpment west of Nieuwoudtville where it grows in large swarms on a light sandy clay called tillite. The species has been observed to be pollinated exclusively by monkey beetles.

== Conservation ==
This species has a very small range of only 15 km^{2} (5.8 sq mi), and is known from just five separate locations. Over the last half century about 80% of its habitat has been lost to wheat cultivation, but the decline has been stopped for the moment. Further development into crop land and invasive alien grasses may endanger the species in the future. It therefore is considered vulnerable.
