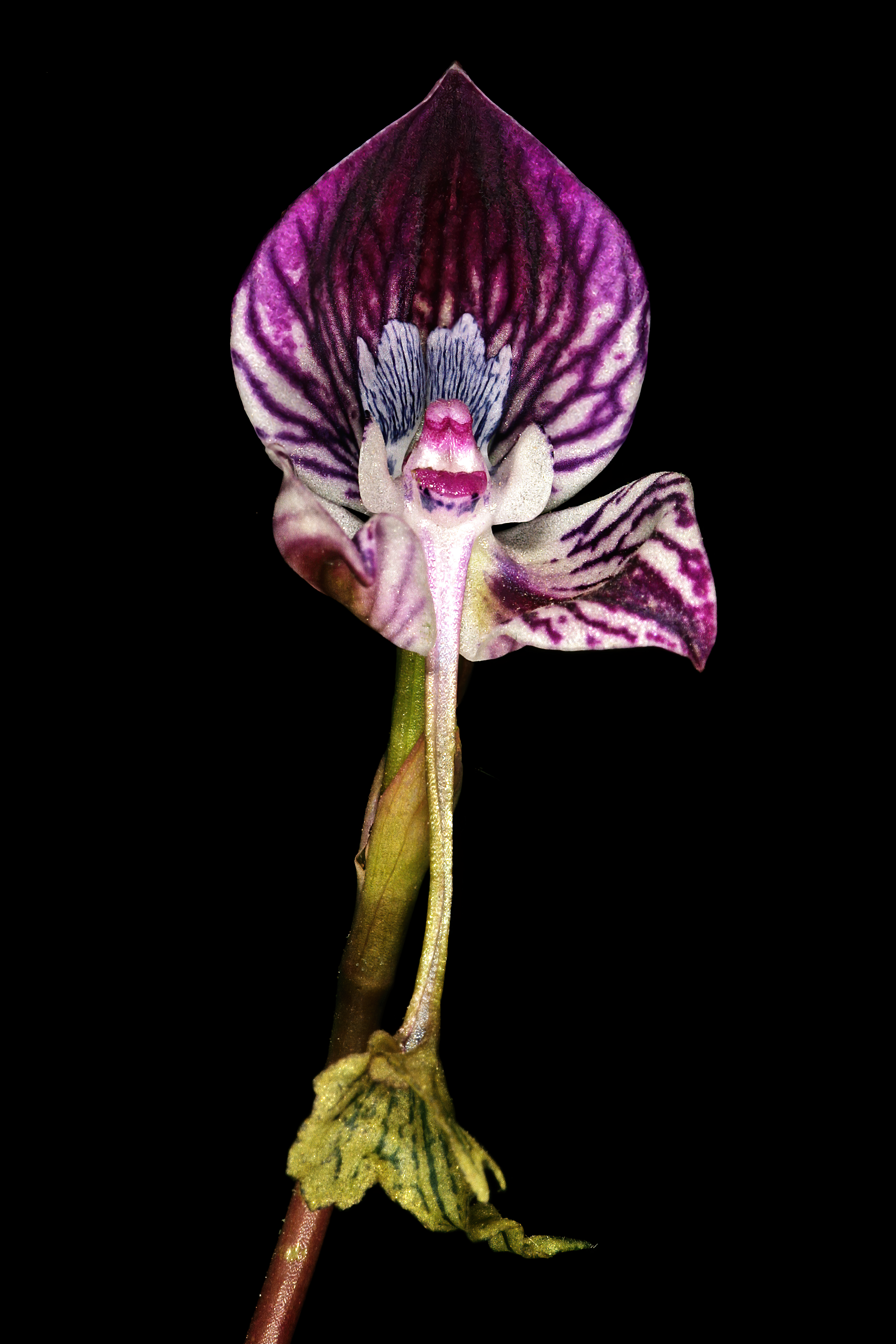

Scientific classification
- Kingdom: Plantae
- Clade: Tracheophytes
- Clade: Angiosperms
- Clade: Monocots
- Order: Asparagales
- Family: Orchidaceae
- Subfamily: Orchidoideae
- Genus: Disa
- Species: D. spathulata

Binomial name
- Disa spathulata (L.f.) Sw.

Synonyms
- Herschelia spathulata (L.f.) Rolfe; Herschelianthe spathulata (L.f.) Rauschert; Orchis spathulata L.f.; Satyrium spathulatum (L.f.) Thunb.

= Disa spathulata =

Species of flowering plant

Disa spathulata, the Oupa-Met-Sy-Pyp, is a perennial plant and geophyte belonging to the genus Disa and is part of the fynbos and renosterveld. The plant is endemic to the Northern Cape and the Western Cape. It occurs from Nieuwoudtville, southwards to Bredasdorp and eastwards to Touws River. Cereal and wheat cultivation has taken over large parts of the plant's habitat, especially at Caledon, Worcester, Tulbagh, Ceres and Piketberg. The remaining plants grow between ploughed fields, orchards and on road shoulders. The exact status of the species is currently unknown and will only be determined after a comprehensive investigation.

There are two subspecies:

- Disa spathulata subsp. spathulata
- Disa spathulata subsp. tripartita (Lindl.) H.P.Linder
