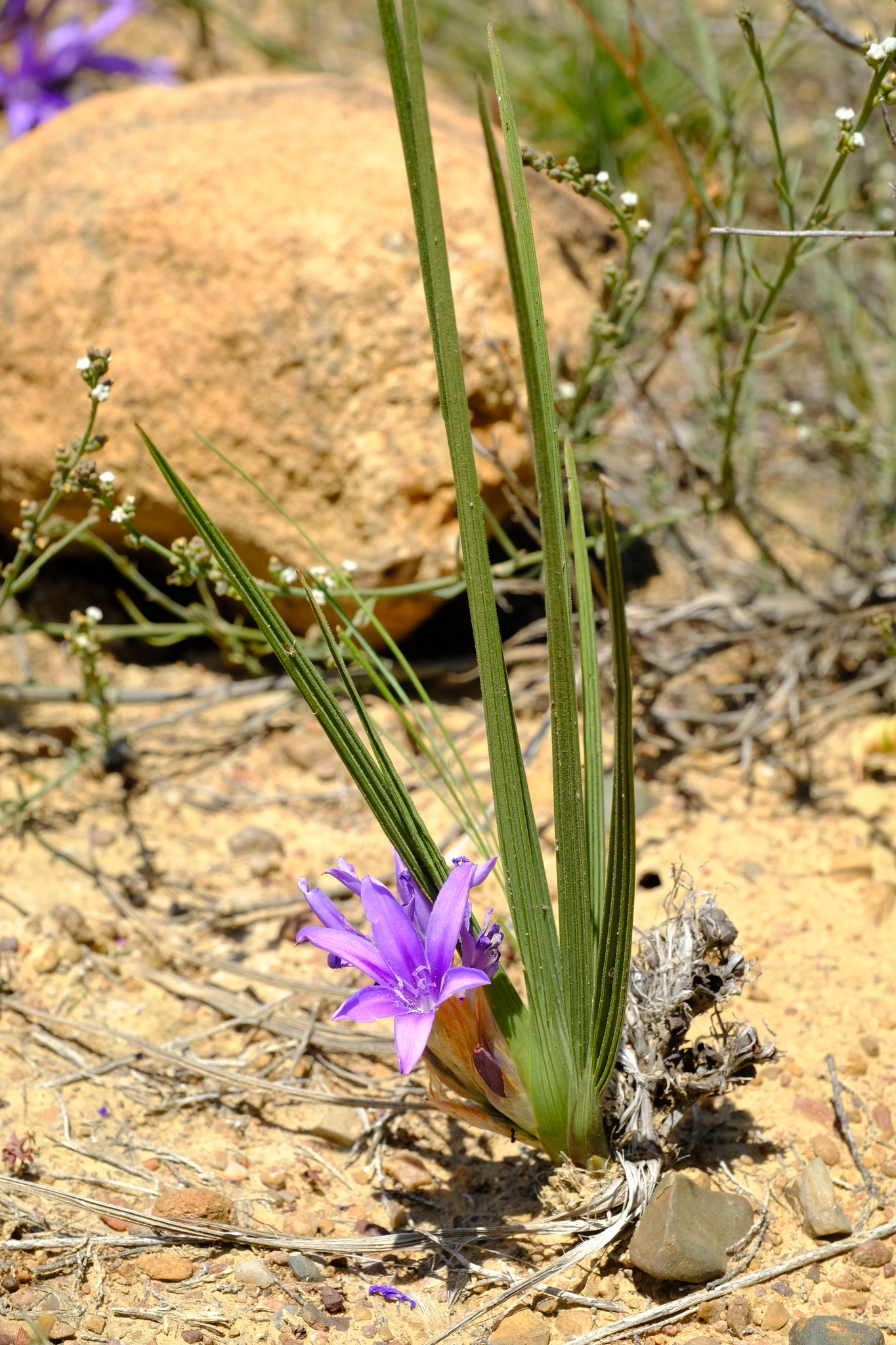

Scientific classification
- Kingdom: Plantae
- Clade: Tracheophytes
- Clade: Angiosperms
- Clade: Monocots
- Order: Asparagales
- Family: Iridaceae
- Genus: Babiana
- Species: B. papyracea

Binomial name
- Babiana papyracea Goldblatt & J.C.Manning

= Babiana papyracea =

Species of flowering plant

Babiana papyracea is a species of geophytic, perennial flowering plant in the family Iridaceae. The species is endemic to the Northern Cape, occurring at Nieuwoudtville and forming part of the renosterveld. Since 1940, the species has lost 95% of its habitat to wheat production. The two remaining subpopulations are threatened by invasive species.
