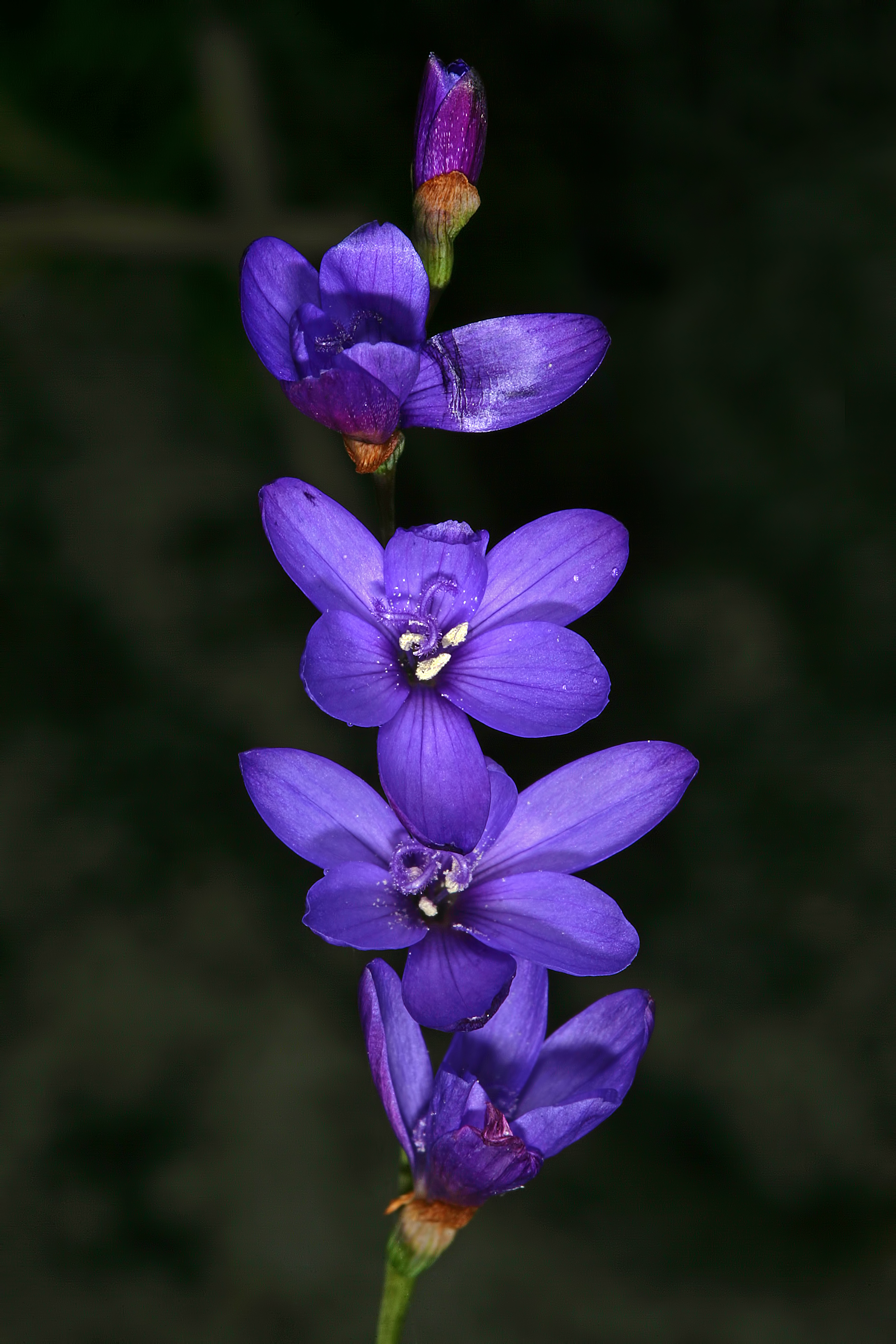

Scientific classification
- Kingdom: Plantae
- Clade: Tracheophytes
- Clade: Angiosperms
- Clade: Monocots
- Order: Asparagales
- Family: Iridaceae
- Genus: Geissorhiza
- Species: G. aspera

Binomial name
- Geissorhiza aspera Goldblatt

Synonyms
- Geissorhiza secunda Ker Gawl.; Geissorhiza secunda KerGawl.; Gladiolus junceus Burm.f.

= Geissorhiza aspera =

Species of plant native to South Africa

Geissorhiza aspera, also known as the blue satin flower or blou sysie, is a geophyte from South Africa.

== Description ==
This velvety-stemmed geophyte grows 10–35 cm (3.9–13.8 in) tall. Plants may, however, be larger or smaller than the typical range. Both the soil conditions and moisture play a role in height. Each plant may branch up to three times, although branching is not always present. The corm is covered in woody tunics. The sword-shaped leaves have thickened margins and midribs. Normally plants will have three leaves, each of which is about the same length as the stem or slightly longer.

Star-shaped flowers are present in August and September. It flowers best after a wet winter. Each inflorescence has between three and seven flowers. They are usually dark blue or violet in colour, sometimes with a darker center. The northern populations (Olifants River Valley, Gifberg and near Bitterfontein) are often white. These flowers may still be blue on the outsides of the tepals. The filaments are usually not all the same length, particularly in northern populations. The green floral bracts dry and turn a rusty brown at the tips as the flowers open. Plants typically seed in October.

== Distribution and habitat ==
This species is endemic to South Africa. This species was believed to be limited to the Western Cape until 2012, when a population in Namaqualand in the Northern Cape. It is found growing between Gifberg and Agulhas, where it is most common on moist sandy soils at altitudes of 70–100 m (230–330 ft).

== Ecology ==
The flowers are most commonly pollinated by money beetles, which are attracted the darker area at the center of the flower. It is also known to be pollinated by the Cape honey bee, a Braunsapsis species, Anisonyx ursus, a bombyllidae species and Anthophora diversipes.

== Conservation ==
This species is classified as being of least concern by the South African National Biodiversity Institute (SANBI) as it is common and widespread. It is also able to tolerate disturbance and is common in disturbed habitats, such as roadsides and parks.
