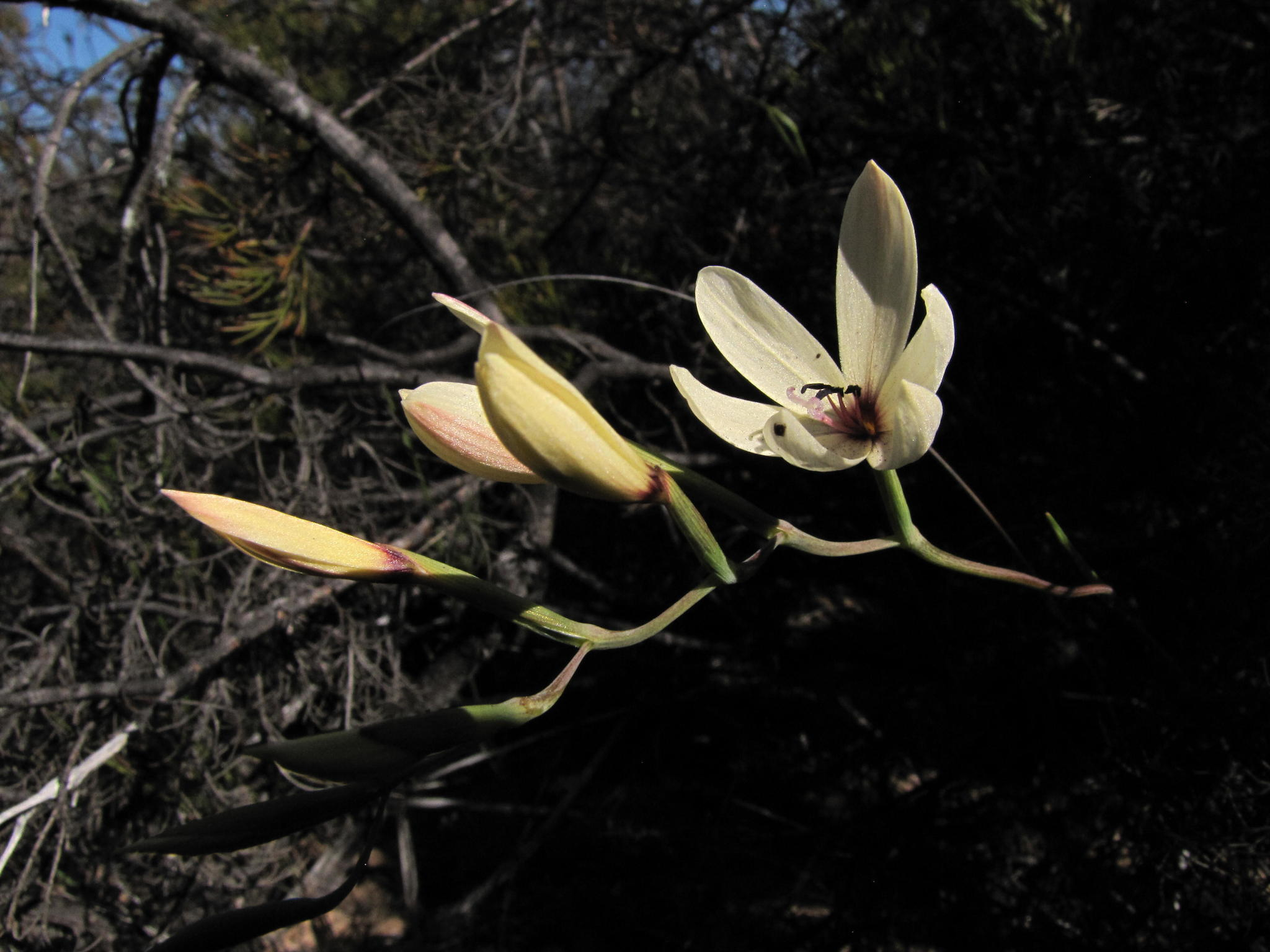

Scientific classification
- Kingdom: Plantae
- Clade: Tracheophytes
- Clade: Angiosperms
- Clade: Monocots
- Order: Asparagales
- Family: Iridaceae
- Genus: Geissorhiza
- Species: G. melanthera

Binomial name
- Geissorhiza melanthera Goldblatt & J.C.Manning

= Geissorhiza melanthera =

Species of flowering plant

Geissorhiza melanthera is a species of flowering plant in the family Iridaceae. It is a small perennial plant of 14–18 cm high. It survives the dry southern summer through storage of its resources in a corm. The stem carries two or three erect, sticky leaves of up to 18 cm (7 in) long, H-shaped in cross-section. This species blooms with six to twelve bilaterally symmetrical flowers, in a spike. Sometimes the spike has one side branch with fewer flowers. Each flower has six pale beige perianth lobes, a purple-red ring around a purple red tube and three blackish stamens. Each flower is subtended by two 1.25–2.25 cm long green bracts. This species flowers from the end of September till mid October. It is an endemic of the western slopes of the Piketberg Mountain Range in the Western Cape province of South Africa.

== Taxonomy ==
The species was described in a publication in 2013 by South African botanists Peter Goldblatt and John Manning. It belongs to the section Engysiphon.

== Ecology ==
The bee fly Megapalpus capensis is the only species that has been observed visiting the flowers of Geissorhiza melanthera. Remarkably, G. melanthera is the only Iridaceae known to be pollinated by a bee fly. Megapalpus capensis is also known to visit several Pelargonium species, all of which have white, cream or pale pink petals with blackish markings and mostly dark anthers. Gorteria diffusa that is visited by the same bee fly species often has dark spots on some or all of its yellow or orange ray florets, that closely mimic the bee fly's appearance. The species grows in deep sandy soils, on gentle slopes facing south, in an ecosystem called Leipoldtville Sand Fynbos.

== Conservation ==
Geissorhiza melanthera is known from only two locations, one of which has been requested to allow to reclaim it for the cultivation of rooibos. It is therefore considered endangered.
