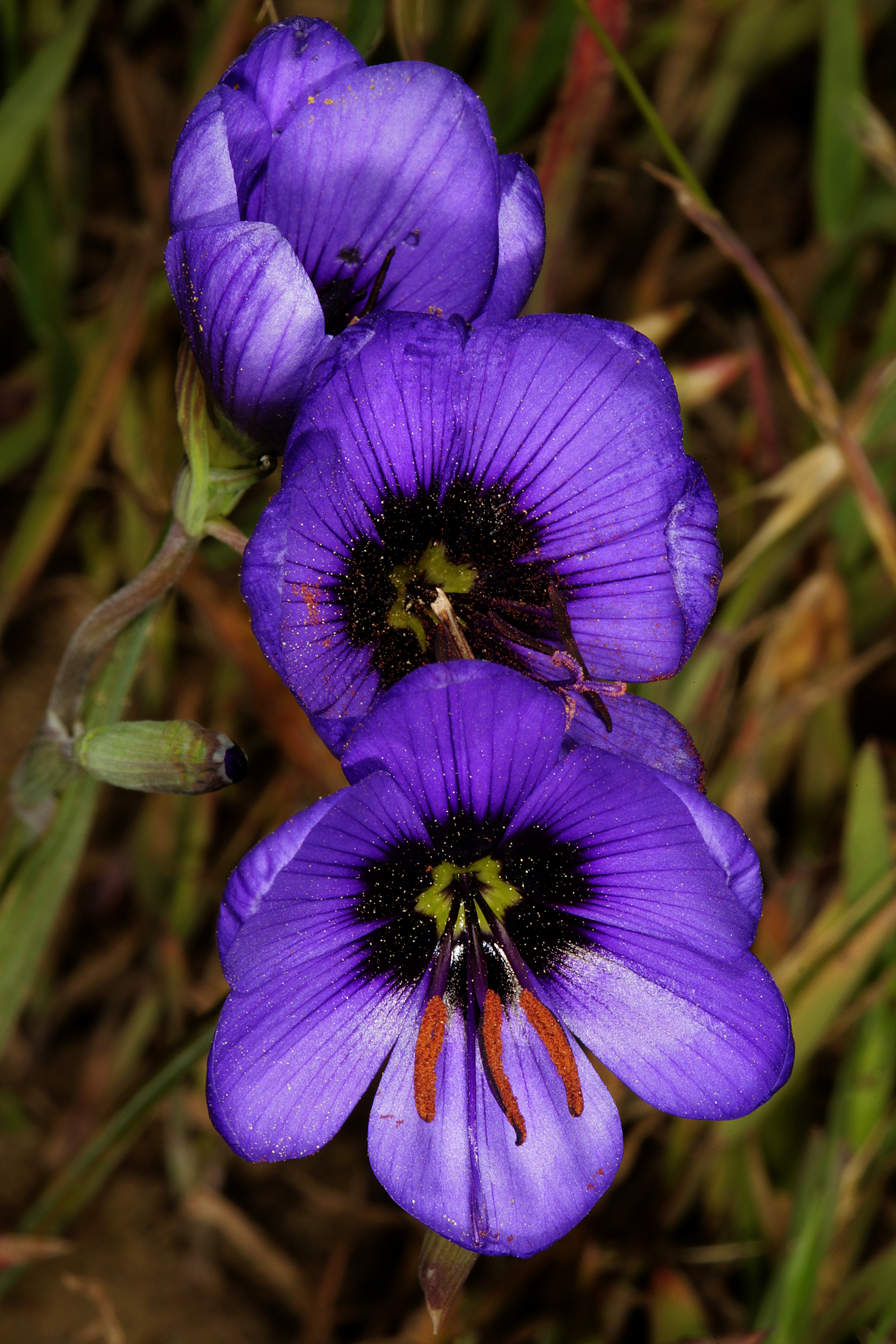

Conservation status
- Vulnerable (SANBI Red List)

Scientific classification
- Kingdom: Plantae
- Clade: Tracheophytes
- Clade: Angiosperms
- Clade: Monocots
- Order: Asparagales
- Family: Iridaceae
- Genus: Geissorhiza
- Species: G. splendidissima

Binomial name
- Geissorhiza splendidissima Diels

= Geissorhiza splendidissima =

Blue pride-of-Nieuwoudtville

Species of plant endemic to South Africa

Geissorhiza splendidissima, the blue pride-of-Nieuwoudtville, is a plant species of geophyte in the family Iridaceae. It is endemic to Nieuwoudtville in the Northern Cape of South Africa. It is also called the Bokkeveld pride and splendid satin.

== Description ==
Geissorhiza splendidissima has glossy, dark blue flowers with dark red-brown pollen. It has imbricate corm tunics typical of subg. Geissorhiza. The zygomorphic flowers with unilateral, declinate stamens and dark red-brown pollen are unusual, as is the somewhat ribbed sheath of the uppermost leaf. This character is shared with the apparently allied G. arenicola, a character that sets these two species somewhat apart in the section.

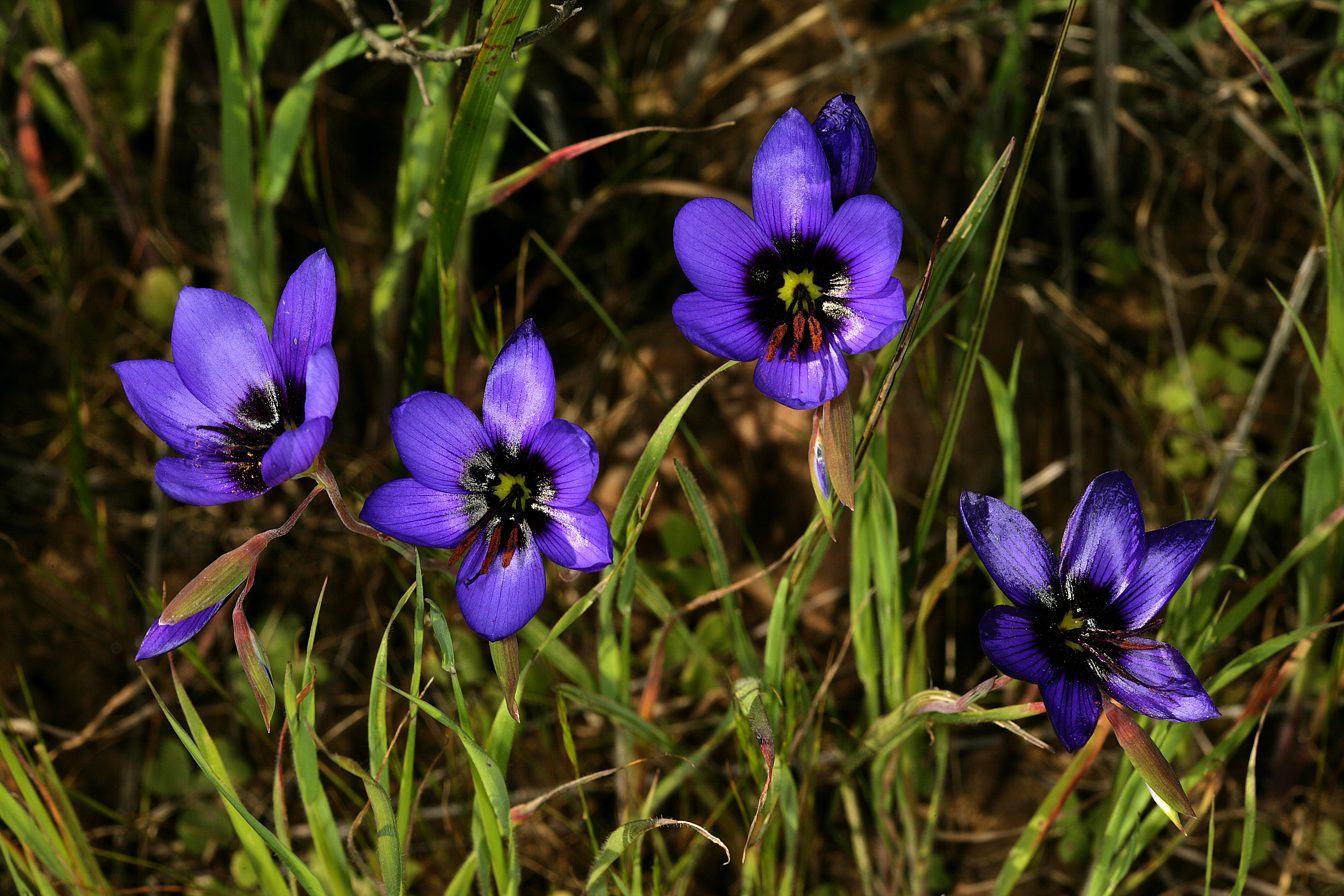

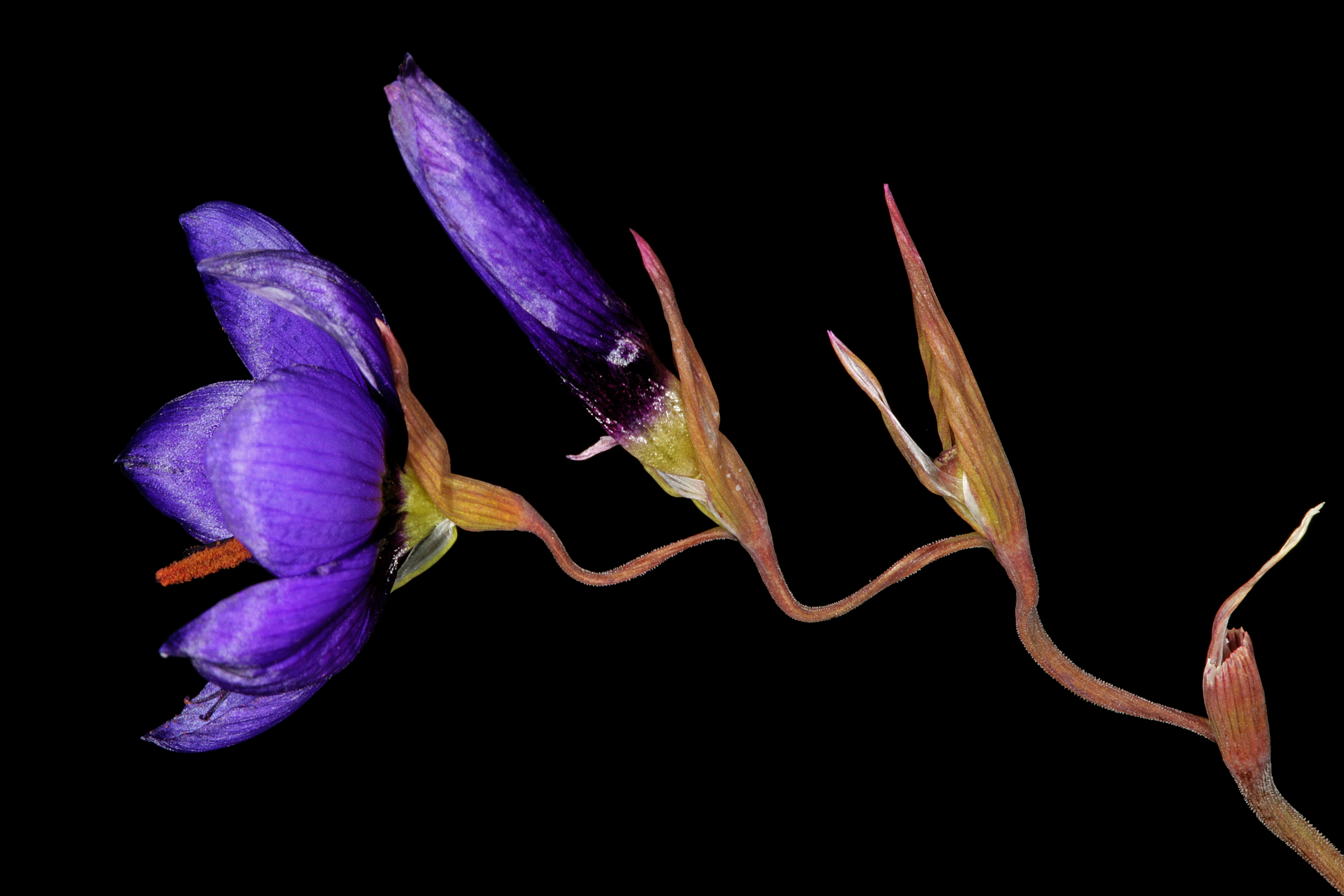

== Distribution ==
Geissorhiza splendidissima is found in damp areas of stony clay flats in Renosterveld vegetation on the Kouebokkeveld Mountains around Nieuwoudtville.

== Conservation status ==
Geissorhiza splendidissima is listed in the Red List of South African Plants as Vulnerable due to having lost 80% of its habitat through farming encroachment, in addition to the fact that it is localised to a small area surrounding Nieuwoudtville.

== Ecology ==
The Namaqua rock rat and the Cape porcupine eat G. splendidissima. Ripened seeds fall off the plant which result in colonies of the plant.
