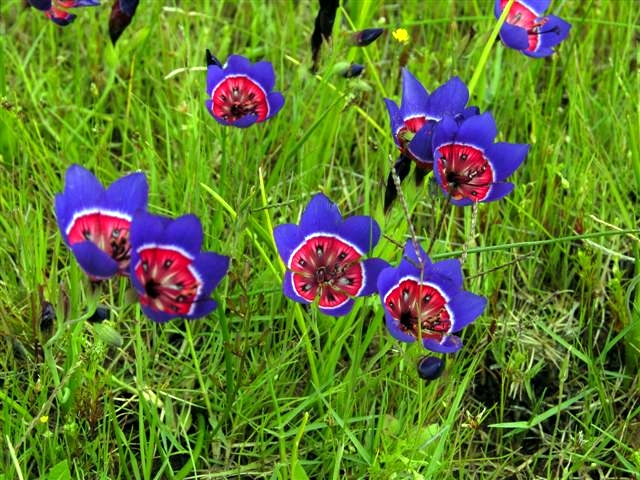
- Geissorhiza radians

Scientific classification
- Kingdom: Plantae
- Clade: Tracheophytes
- Clade: Angiosperms
- Clade: Monocots
- Order: Asparagales
- Family: Iridaceae
- Subfamily: Crocoideae
- Tribe: Croceae
- Genus: Geissorhiza; Ker Gawl.

Type species
- Geissorhiza obtusata Ker Gawl.

Species
- See text

Synonyms
- Anomaza Laws. ex Salisb. Engysiphon G.J.Lewis; Rochea Salisb. Sphaerospora Klatt; Weihea Eckl.

= Geissorhiza =

Genus of flowering plants

Geissorhiza is a genus with 103 species described to date of deciduous perennial flowering plants in the family Iridaceae, first described as a genus in 1803. The entire genus is endemic to the Cape Province of western South Africa. The genus name is derived from the Greek words geisson, meaning "tile", and rhizon, meaning "root".

Selected species:

- Geissorhiza aspera
- Geissorhiza brehmii
- Geissorhiza cantharophila
- Geissorhiza cataractarum
- Geissorhiza cedarmontana
- Geissorhiza ciliatula
- Geissorhiza confusa
- Geissorhiza corrugata
- Geissorhiza darlingensis
- Geissorhiza delicatula
- Geissorhiza demissa
- Geissorhiza divaricata
- Geissorhiza elsiae
- Geissorhiza erubescens
- Geissorhiza esterhuyseniae
- Geissorhiza exilis
- Geissorhiza exscapa
- Geissorhiza eurystigma
- Geissorhiza geminata
- Geissorhiza grandiflora
- Geissorhiza helmei
- Geissorhiza hesperanthoides
- Geissorhiza heterostyla
- Geissorhiza imbricata
- Geissorhiza inaequalis
- Geissorhiza inflexa
- Geissorhiza intermedia
- Geissorhiza kamiesmontana
- Geissorhiza karooica
- Geissorhiza lapidosa
- Geissorhiza leopoldtii
- Geissorhiza lithicola
- Geissorhiza mathewsii
- Geissorhiza melanthera
- Geissorhiza mellimontana
- Geissorhiza minuta
- Geissorhiza monanthos
- Geissorhiza monticola
- Geissorhiza namaquamontana
- Geissorhiza nigromontana
- Geissorhiza nubigena
- Geissorhiza nutans
- Geissorhiza ornithogaloides
- Geissorhiza outeniquensis
- Geissorhiza ovata
- Geissorhiza platystigma
- Geissorhiza pseudinaequalis
- Geissorhiza purpurascens
- Geissorhiza purpureolutea
- Geissorhiza radians
- Geissorhiza rupicola
- Geissorhiza saxicola
- Geissorhiza schinzii
- Geissorhiza scopulosa
- Geissorhiza seracina
- Geissorhiza silenoides
- Geissorhiza similis
- Geissorhiza splendidissima
- Geissorhiza stenosiphon
- Geissorhiza sufflava
- Geissorhiza tabularis
- Geissorhiza tenella
- Geissorhiza tricolor
- Geissorhiza tulbaghensis
- Geissorhiza uliginosa
- Geissorhiza unifolia
