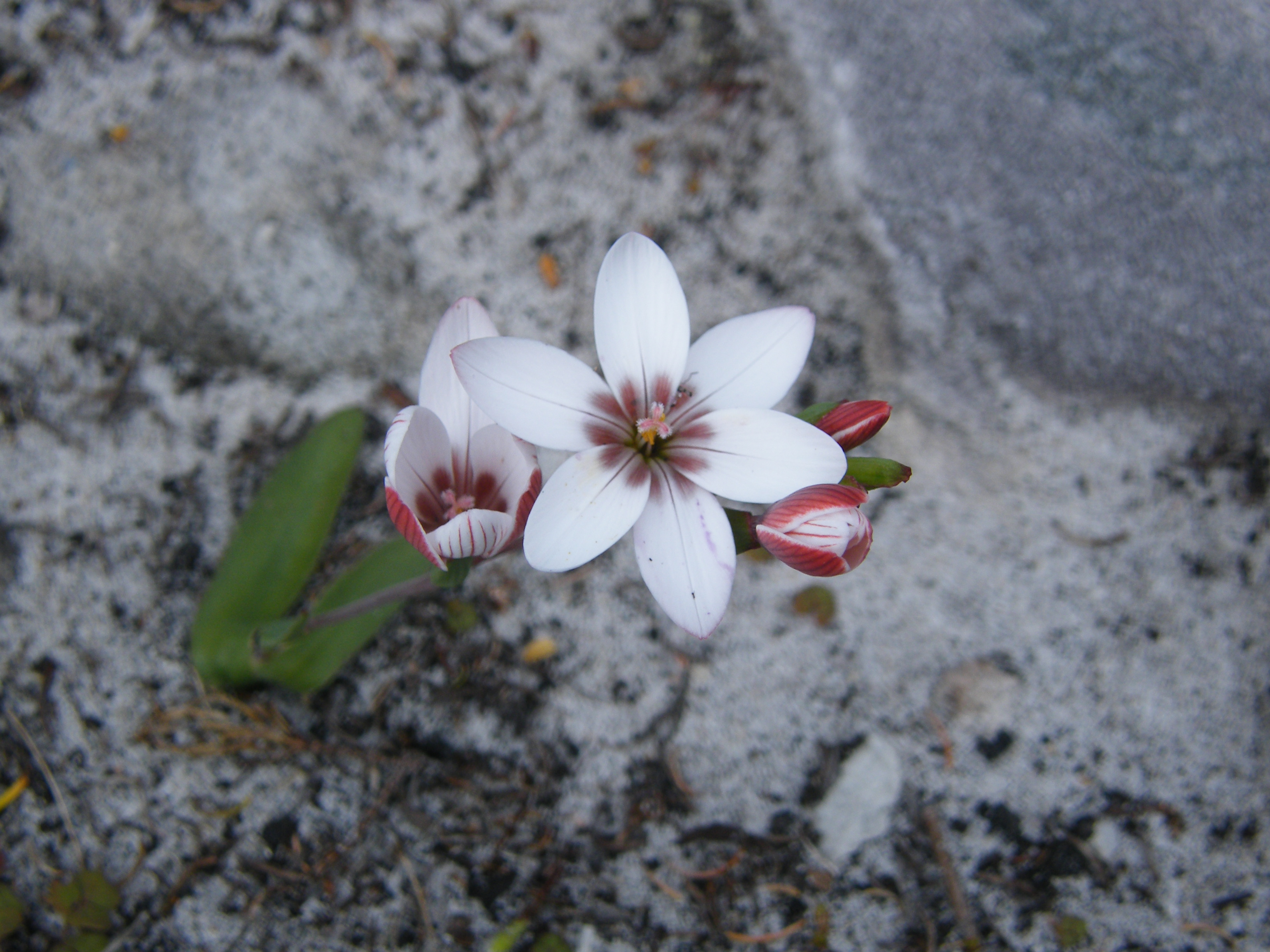

Scientific classification
- Kingdom: Plantae
- Clade: Tracheophytes
- Clade: Angiosperms
- Clade: Monocots
- Order: Asparagales
- Family: Iridaceae
- Genus: Geissorhiza
- Species: G. ovata

Binomial name
- Geissorhiza ovata (Burm.f.) Asch. & Graebn.

Synonyms
- Geissorhiza excisa (L.f.) Ker Gawl. Ixia excisa L.f. Ixia ovata Burm.f. Weihea elatior Eckl. Weihea excisa (L.f.) Eckl.

= Geissorhiza ovata =

Species of flowering plant

Geissorhiza ovata is a species of flowering plant in the family Iridaceae. It is found growing on stone ridges and rock outcrops in the Northern Cape Province of South Africa.
