= Dutch Reformed Church, Nieuwoudtville =

Church in Nieuwoudtville, South Africa

Dutch Reformed Church
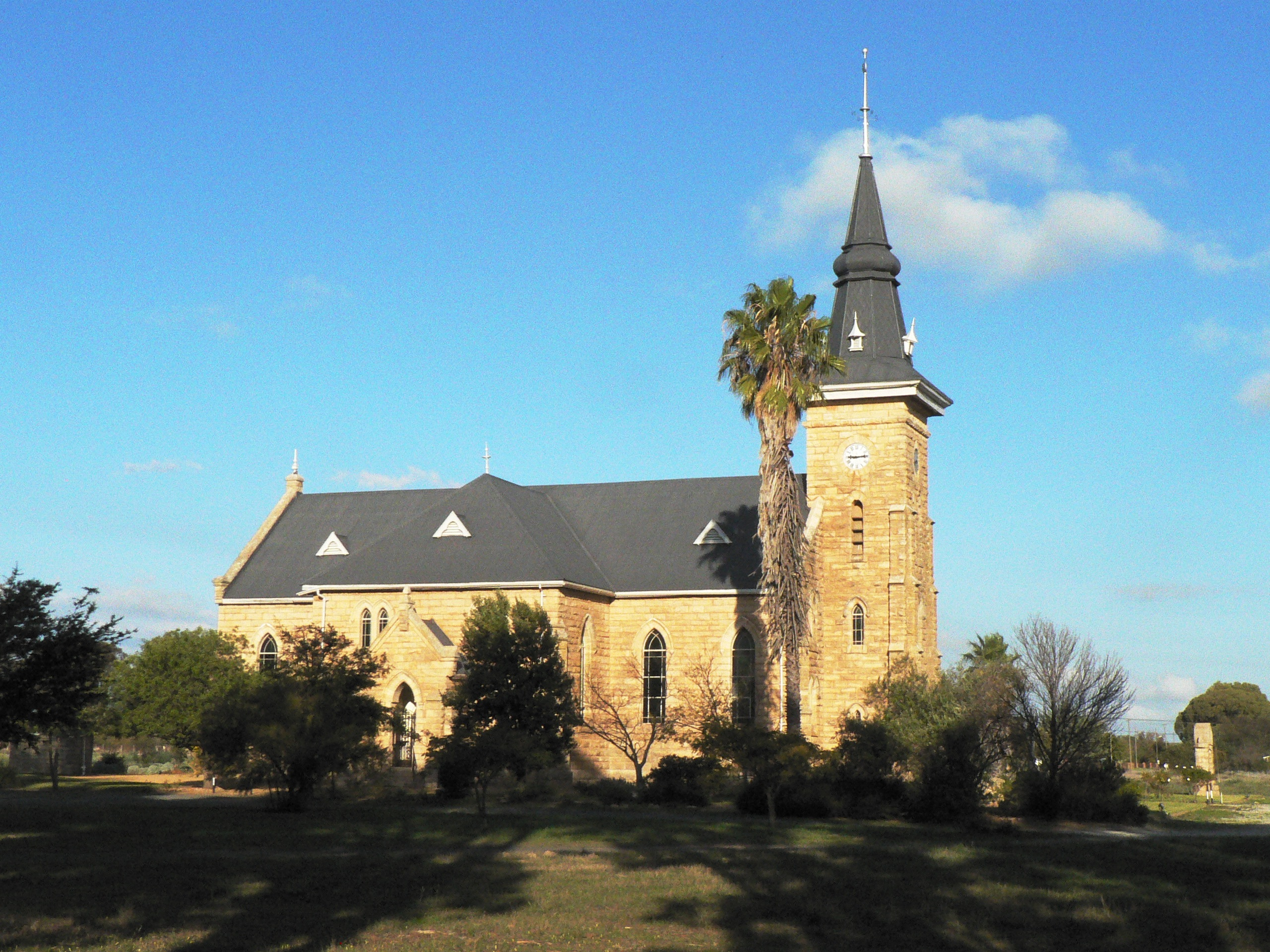
- Dutch Reformed Church
- 31.3756°S 19.1154°E
- Location: Nieuwoudtville
- Country: South Africa
- Denomination: Nederduits Gereformeerde Kerk

History
- Founded: 1897

Architecture
- Functional status: Church

The Dutch Reformed Church in Nieuwoudtville is located under the Presbytery of Clanwilliam and has its centre in the town of the same name in the south-western corner of the Northern Cape province, approximately 70 km northwest of Calvinia and 50 km northeast of Vanrhynsdorp. Although the congregation is located in the Northern Cape, since the dissolution of the Presbytery of Calvinia it has fallen under the adjacent, Western Cape presbytery.

== Background ==
Nieuwoudtville and its surroundings were a ward of the then extensive congregation of Hantam (Calvinia) from 1847 to 1897. In 1885, the church council, under the leadership of Rev. William Robertson (minister from 1883 until his resignation in 1889), decided to build a so-called auxiliary church on Willemsrivier, a farm in the Bokkeveld.

On 3 May 1897, the Presbytery Commission met and unanimously decided to establish a congregation that would bear the name Nieuwoudtville because the land that the church had purchased for the township had belonged to the Nieuwoudt brothers. Some of the farms on the Groenrivier where the Nieuwoudts lived still stand today. The area around Nieuwoudtville is sometimes called “the Boland of the Northwest” because the rainfall is noticeably higher than in the rest of the Calvinia district.

At its founding, the congregation consisted of 480 members and 1,200 souls, compared to 156 professing and 28 baptized members in 2017. Rev. C.A. Neethling was called to pastor on April 25, 1898, 22 days after his 27th birthday, and on September 17 he was confirmed in his first congregation here. There was no parsonage available yet, but the congregation grew and in 1899 the cornerstone of the spacious parsonage was laid, which is still in use today.

== Ministers ==
- Christoffel Albertyn Neethling, 17 Sep. 1898 – 1909
- Dr. Willem Petrus Steenkamp, 1 Oct. 1910 – 1919
- Hermanus Jacobus Potgieter, 31 Jul. 1920 – 1925
- Gustav Theodore Tobias Kikillus, 10 Oct. 1925 – 1929
- Cornelis Muller, 26 Apr. 1930 – 1932
- Stephanus Gabriel Basson, 8 Apr. 1933 – 1943
- Johannes Samuel Loots, 15 May 1943 – 1945
- Johannes Marthinus Nicolaas Breedt, 3 Aug. 1946 – 1951
- Johannes Daniël Steenkamp, 28 Apr. 1951 –
