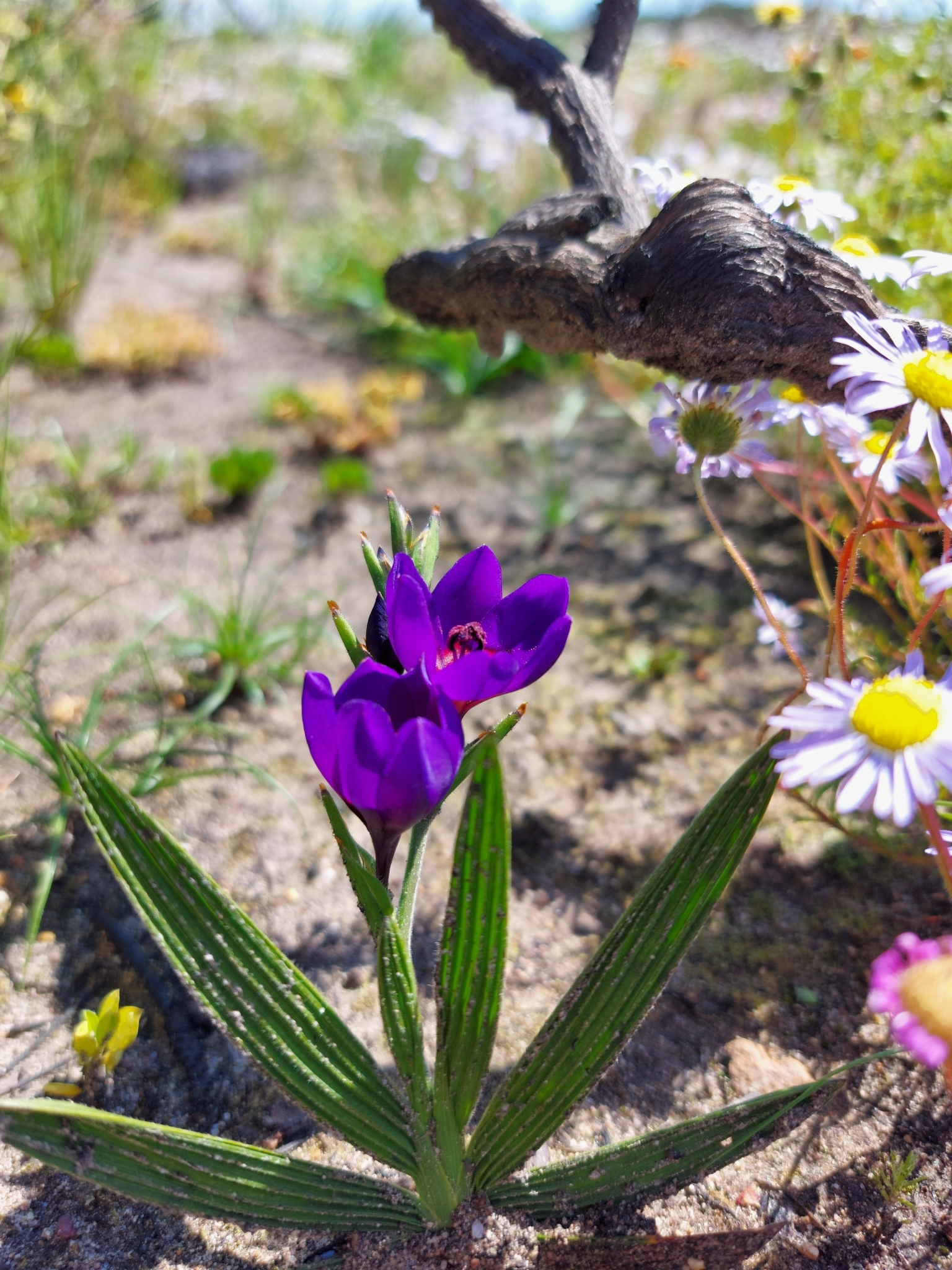

Scientific classification
- Kingdom: Plantae
- Clade: Tracheophytes
- Clade: Angiosperms
- Clade: Monocots
- Order: Asparagales
- Family: Iridaceae
- Genus: Babiana
- Species: B. regia

Binomial name
- Babiana regia (G.J.Lewis) Goldblatt & J.C.Manning

= Babiana regia =

Species of flowering plant

Babiana regia is a perennial flowering plant and geophyte belonging to the genus Babiana. The species is endemic to the Western Cape and occurs from Agter-Paarl to Stellenbosch in the fynbos and renosterveld. It has a range of less than 10 km^{2} and there are six small, fragmented subpopulations. The total population is less than 1 000 plants.

The plant has lost 95% of its habitat to mainly crop cultivation. The remaining subpopulations are threatened by, among others, development, lack of a fire program, invasive plants, overgrazing, eutrophication and sand mining.
