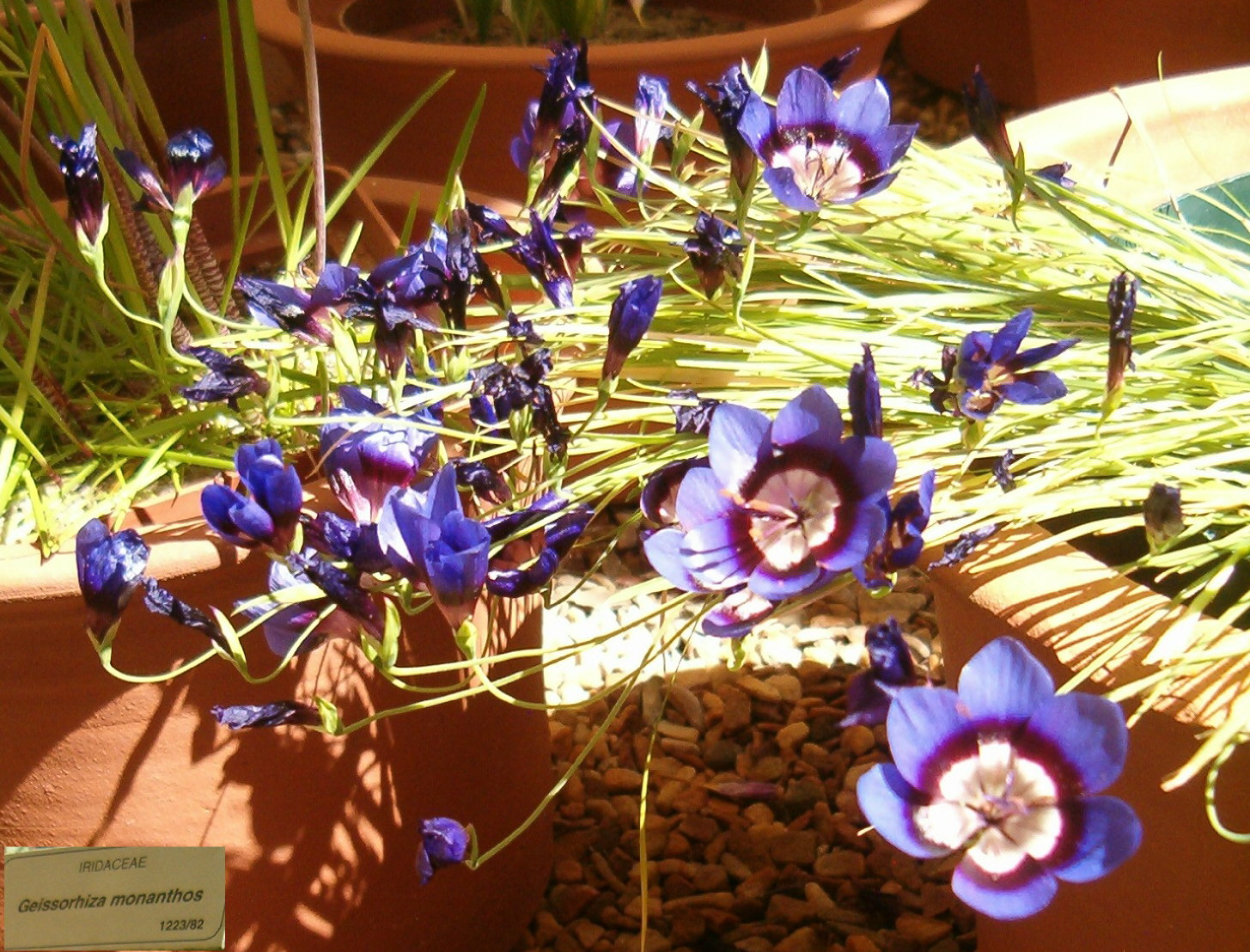

Scientific classification
- Kingdom: Plantae
- Clade: Tracheophytes
- Clade: Angiosperms
- Clade: Monocots
- Order: Asparagales
- Family: Iridaceae
- Genus: Geissorhiza
- Species: G. monanthos

Binomial name
- Geissorhiza monanthos Eckl.

Synonyms
- Geissorhiza lewisiae R.C. Foster

= Geissorhiza monanthos =

Species of flowering plant

Geissorhiza monanthos is a Geissorhiza species found growing on sandy slopes in the Western Cape Province of South Africa.
