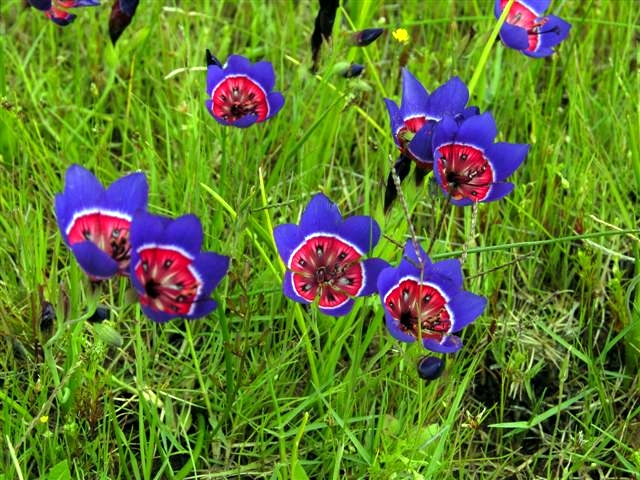

Scientific classification
- Kingdom: Plantae
- Clade: Tracheophytes
- Clade: Angiosperms
- Clade: Monocots
- Order: Asparagales
- Family: Iridaceae
- Genus: Geissorhiza
- Species: G. radians

Binomial name
- Geissorhiza radians Goldblatt

Synonyms
- Geissorhiza rochensis var. rochensis

= Geissorhiza radians =

Species of flowering plant

Geissorhiza radians or winecup flower, is a highly threatened species from the Iris family with fewer than 10 remaining sub-populations growing in south-western Cape Town, South Africa. The deep purple flowers with large, red centres grow in dense colonies, which makes for a spectacular flower display from mid-September, particularly around the town of Darling. Its seasonally wet lowlands habitat is, however, becoming increasingly threatened, with more than 80% of its original habitat now permanently transformed into agriculture or urban sprawl and the remaining populations threatened by encroaching invasive alien vegetation and fertilizer runoff. The dark-centred flowers aim to attract specific pollinators from the horsefly family (Tabanidae), but the specific interactions still require additional investigation. Each plant has 1 to 6 flowers. It is also found in smaller patches through to Gordon's Bay. The plants nearly always occur in seasonally moist wetlands which become dry in the summer months.

== Growing ==
The plant normally starts to flower after 3 years after being planted, they can be grown from a pot or lawn if sufficient moisture is provided. It might be hard to buy this plant since it is rare.
