= Nieuwoudtville =

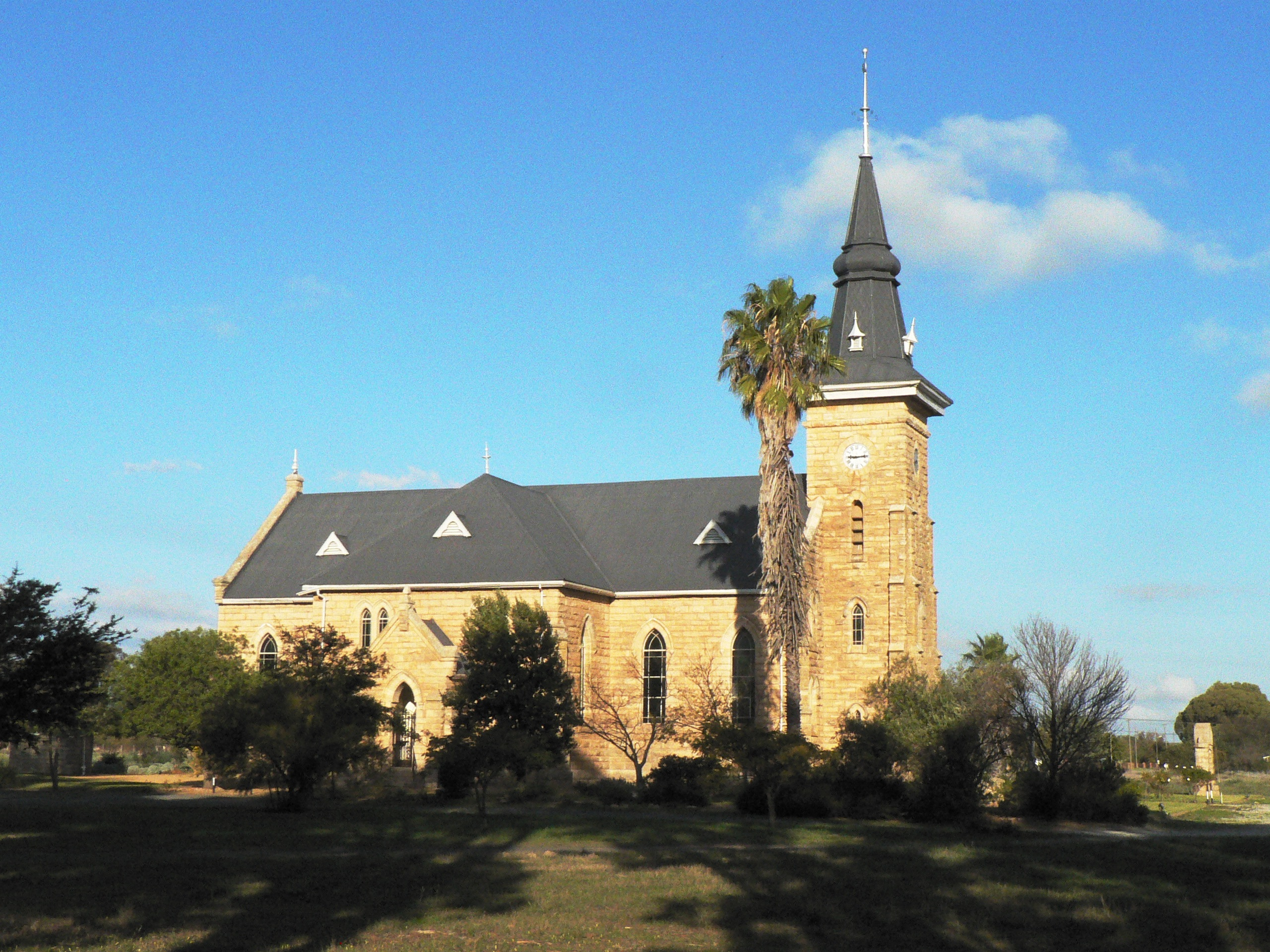
- Dutch Reformed Church

- Location within Northern Cape Location within South Africa
- Coordinates: 31°22′36″S 19°06′45″E
- Country: South Africa
- Province: Northern Cape
- District: Namakwa
- Municipality: Hantam
- Established: 1897; 129 years ago

Area
  - Total: 26.26 km^{2} (10.14 sq mi)

Population (2011)
  - Total: 2,093
  - Density: 79.70/km^{2} (206.4/sq mi)

Racial makeup (2011)
  - Black African: 9.0%
  - Coloured: 80.6%
  - Indian/Asian: 1.6%
  - White: 8.2%
  - Other: 0.6%

First languages (2011)
  - Afrikaans: 95.2%
  - English: 3.1%
  - Other: 1.8%
- Time zone: UTC+2 (SAST)
- Postal code (street): 8181
- PO box: 8180
- Area code: 027

Nieuwoudtville is a town in Namakwa District Municipality in the Northern Cape province of South Africa. The town lies on the Bokkeveld Escarpment, and was established in 1897. The Nieuwoudtville Falls on the Doring River are located a few kilometres north of the town.

Nieuwoudtville is in the Succulent Karoo biome, which has less than 200 mm rainfall in winter and is even more arid in summer. However the region about this community is an oasis in the biome, with the Doring River falling off the escarpment nearby.

Nieuwoudtville is a popular tourist destination in South Africa, especially during the wild flower season, because of its unique placement in the Karoo. The Karoo plain is known as the Bokkeveld and has a reputation as the bulb capital of the world. During spring geophytes, also known as bulbs, bloom in the area around the town. The bulbs are very rain dependent. There is also a bulb nursery that sells bulbs to the public.

Other than the bulb flower season, there are a wide variety of attractions in Nieuwoudtville such as a waterfall just outside the town, a quiver tree forest, local sandstone ruins, glacial pavement, the Oorlogskloof Nature Reserve, the Hantam National Botanical Garden and other activities that include bird watching, hiking and a star gazing.

In the 2025 World Air Quality Report, Nieuwoudtville had the cleanest air of the 9,446 cities and towns measured, with a PM2.5 concentration of 1.0 µg/m³.

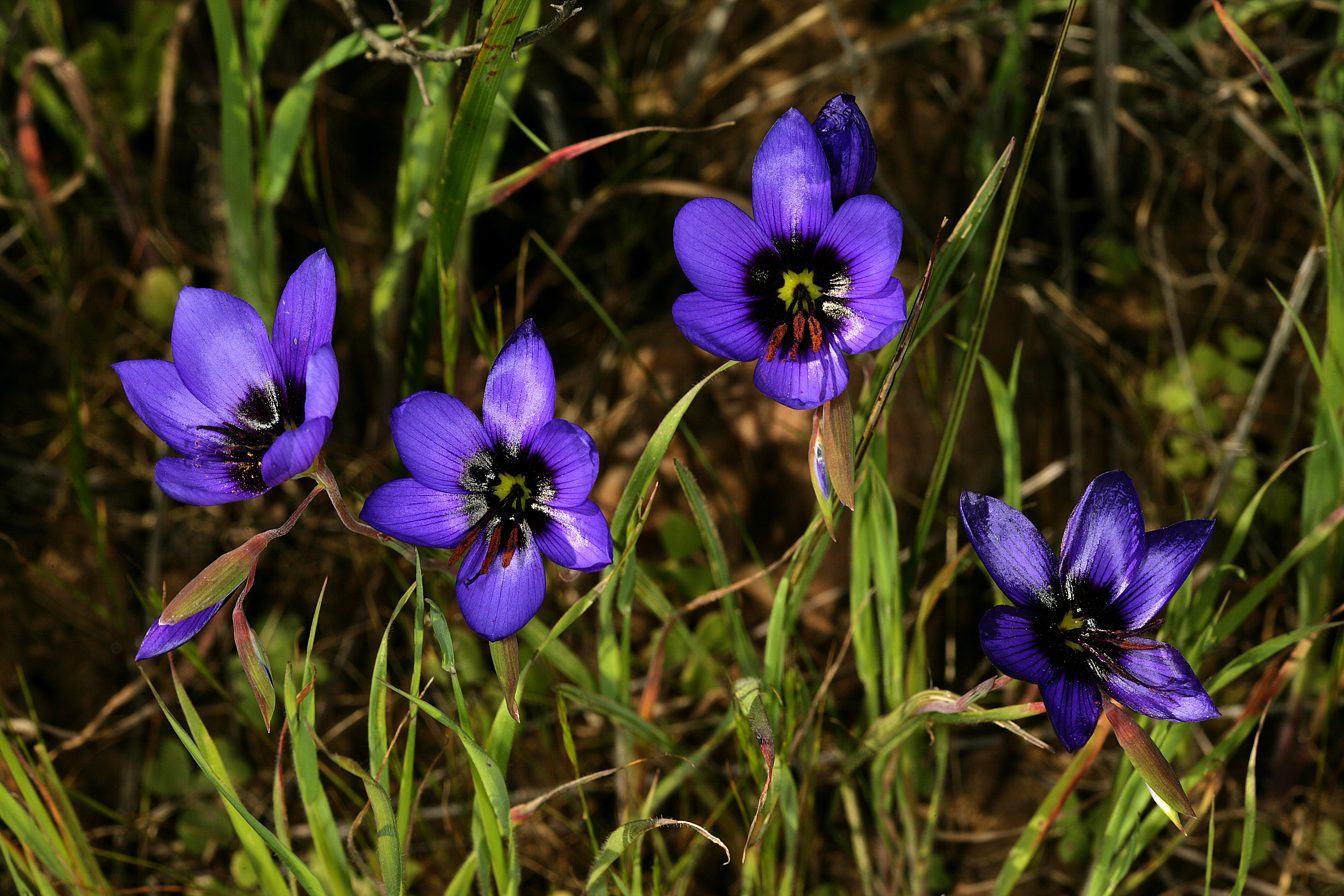
Blue pride-of-Nieuwoudtville endemic to Nieuwoudtville

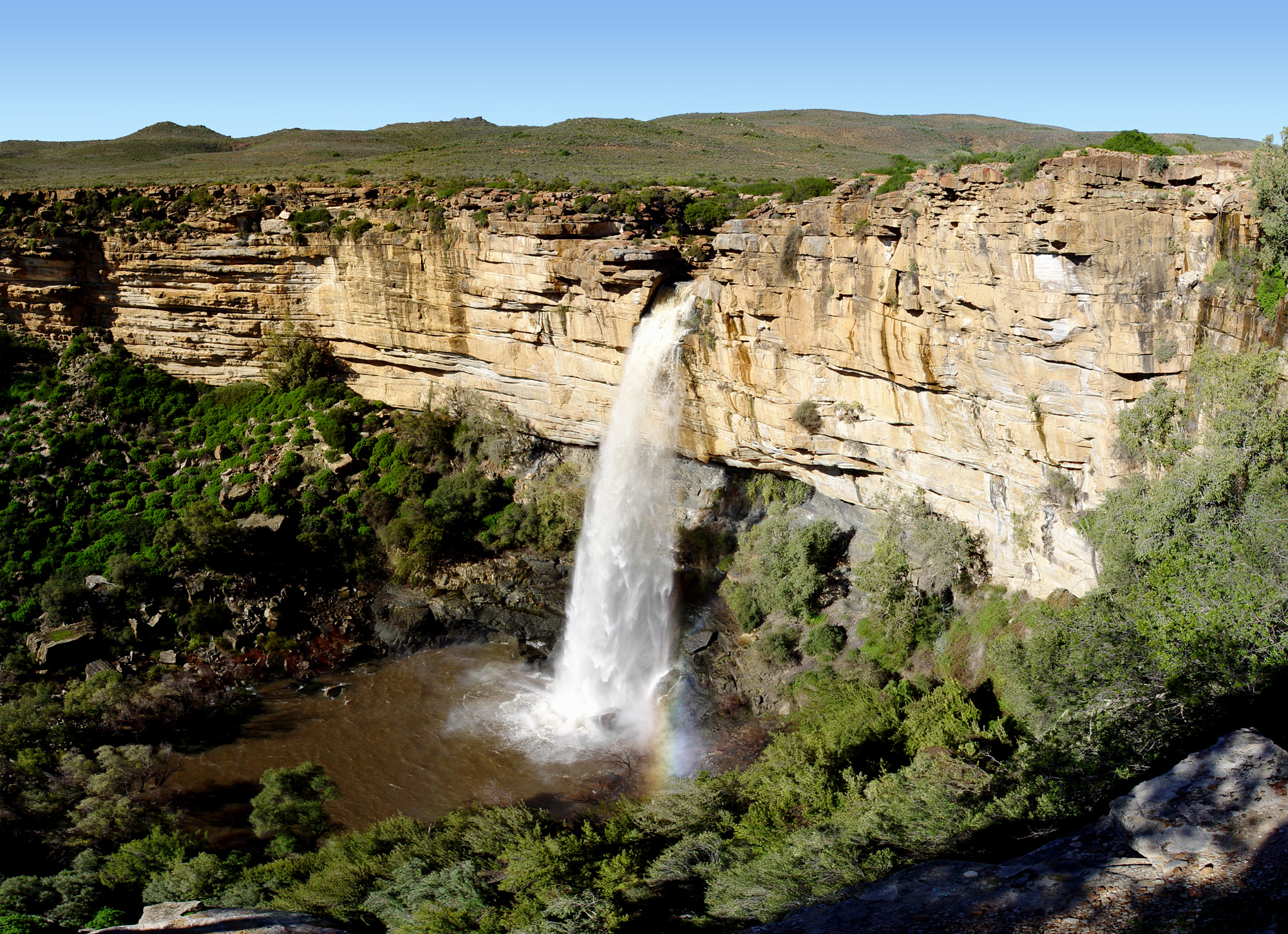
Nieuwoudtville Waterfall
