= Salpingostylis =

Conservation status
- Imperiled (NatureServe)

Scientific classification
- Kingdom: Plantae
- Clade: Embryophytes
- Clade: Tracheophytes
- Clade: Spermatophytes
- Clade: Angiosperms
- Clade: Monocots
- Order: Asparagales
- Family: Iridaceae
- Subfamily: Iridoideae
- Tribe: Tigridieae
- Genus: Salpingostylis; Small
- Species: S. caelestina

Binomial name
- Salpingostylis caelestina (W.Bartram) Small

Synonyms
- Beatonia caelestina (W.Bartram) Klatt; Calydorea caelestina (W.Bartram) Goldblatt & Henrich; Ixia caelestina W.Bartram (1791) (basionym); Marica caelestina (W.Bartram) Ker Gawl.; Nemastylis caelestina (W.Bartram) Nutt.; Sphenostigma caelestinum (W.Bartram) R.C.Foster; Trichonema caelestinum (W.Bartram) Sweet

Genus of flowering plants

Salpingostylis is a genus of flowering plants in the iris family. It includes a single species, Salpingostylis caelestina (or Salpingostylis coelestina), a bulbous geophyte endemic to northern Florida.
