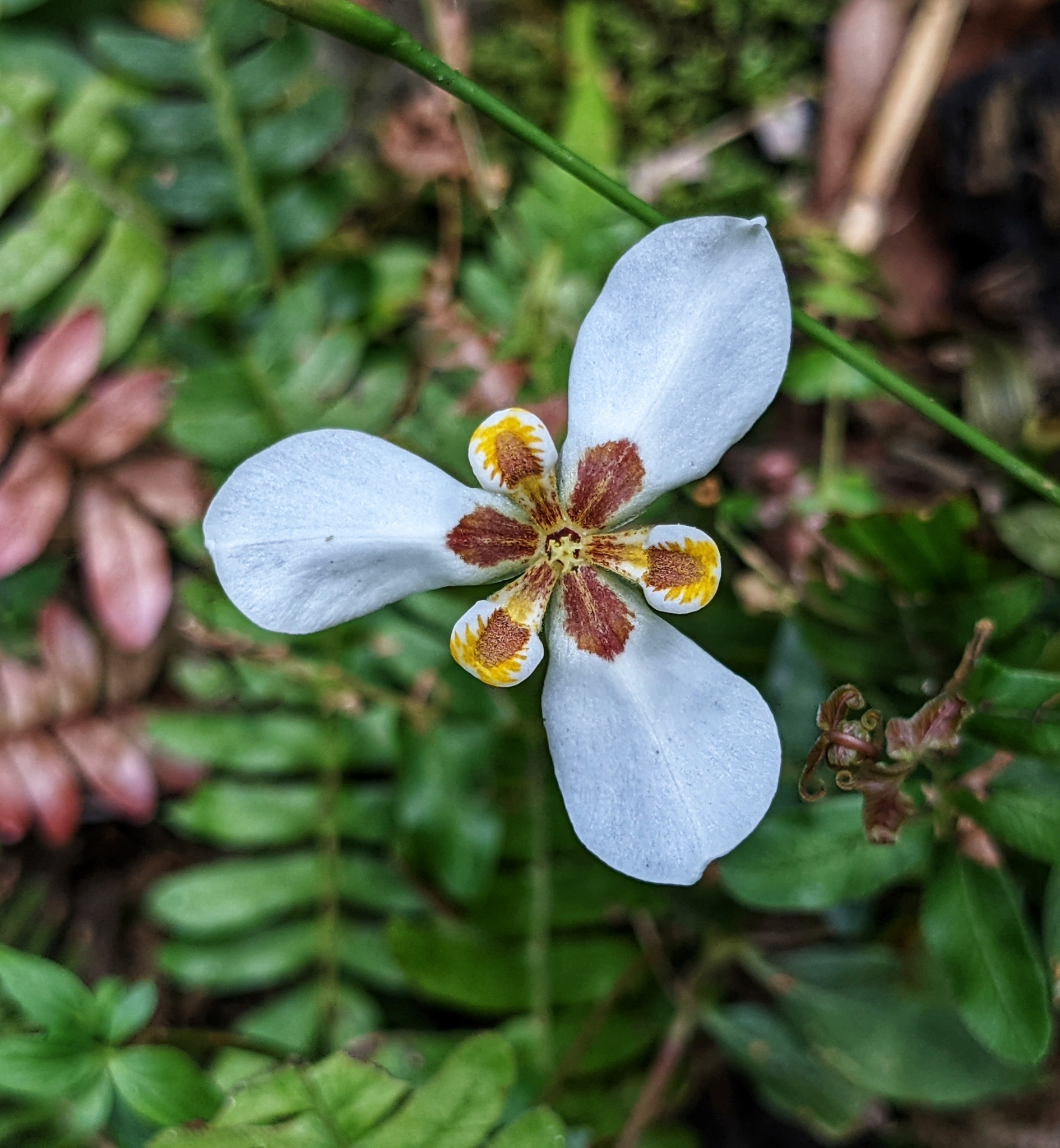
- Hesperoxiphion huilense

Scientific classification
- Kingdom: Plantae
- Clade: Tracheophytes
- Clade: Angiosperms
- Clade: Monocots
- Order: Asparagales
- Family: Iridaceae
- Subfamily: Iridoideae
- Tribe: Tigridieae
- Genus: Hesperoxiphion; Baker

Type species
- Hesperoxiphion peruviana (Baker) Baker

= Hesperoxiphion =

Genus of flowering plants

Hesperoxiphion is a genus of flowering plants in the family Iridaceae, first described as a genus in 1877. It is native to northwestern South America. The genus name is derived from the Greek words hesperos, meaning "western", and xiphos, meaning "sword".

Species

- Hesperoxiphion herrerae (Diels ex R.C.Foster) Ravenna - Cajamarca region in Peru
- Hesperoxiphion huilense Ravenna - Colombia
- Hesperoxiphion niveum (Ravenna) Ravenna - Cajamarca region in Peru
- Hesperoxiphion pardalis (Ravenna) Ravenna - Apurímac region in Peru
- Hesperoxiphion peruvianum (Baker) Baker - Bolivia, Peru
