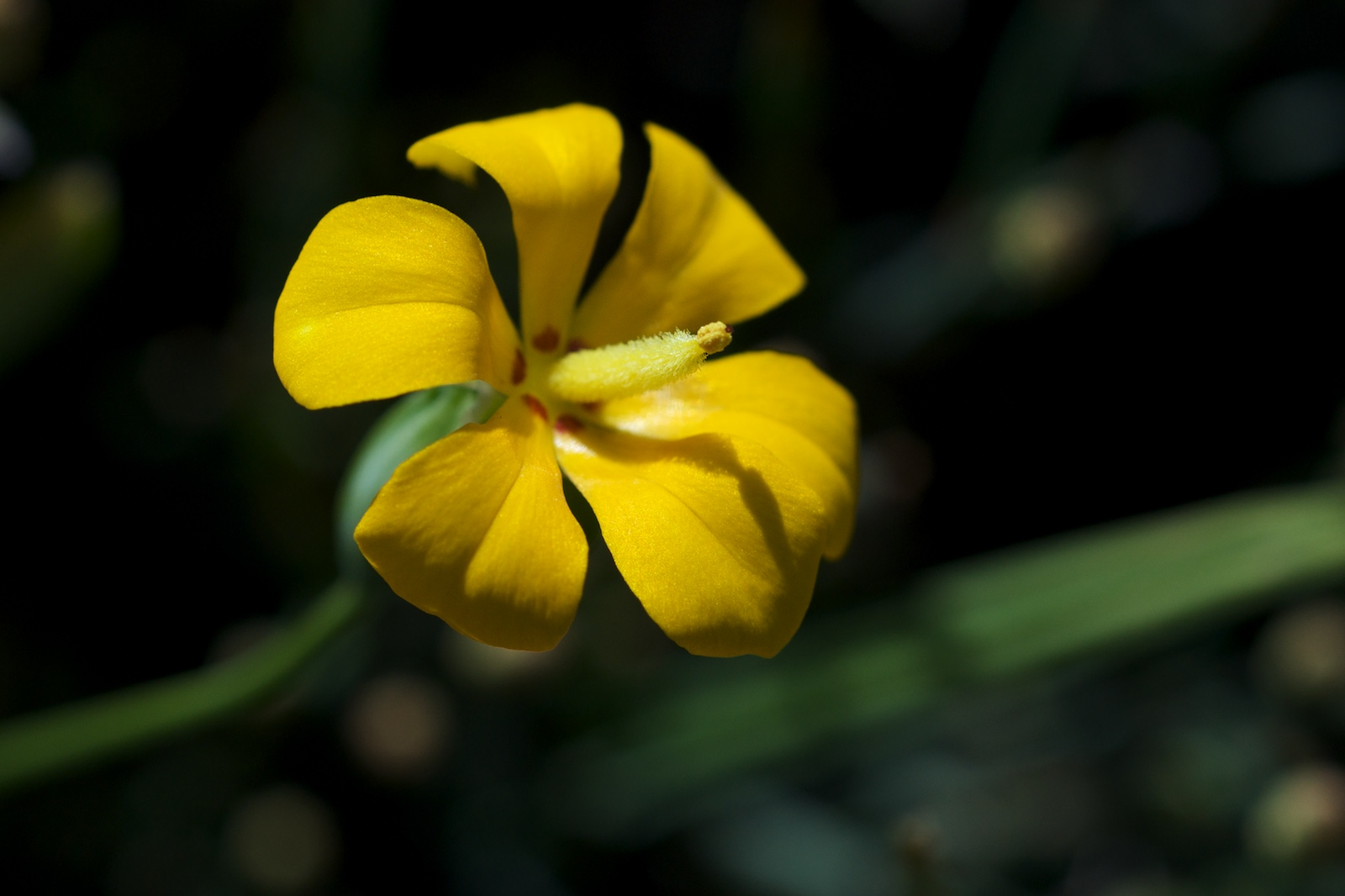
- Solenomelus pedunculatus

Scientific classification
- Kingdom: Plantae
- Clade: Tracheophytes
- Clade: Angiosperms
- Clade: Monocots
- Order: Asparagales
- Family: Iridaceae
- Subfamily: Iridoideae
- Tribe: Sisyrinchieae
- Genus: Solenomelus; Miers

Type species
- Solenomelus chilensis Miers

Synonyms
- Cruckshanksia Miers, invalid name; Lechlera Griseb.; Susarium Phil.

= Solenomelus =

Genus of flowering plants in the iris family

Solenomelus is a genus of South American (Argentina and Chile) species of flowering plants in the family Iridaceae. They are very closely allied to Sisyrinchium with rhizomes, flowers with a perianth tube and a style that is not divided and a single capitate stigma. The genus name is derived from the Greek words solen, meaning "tube", and melos, meaning "member".

Species

- Solenomelus pedunculatus (Gillies ex Hook.) Hochr. – northern + central Chile
- Solenomelus segethi (Phil.) Kuntze – central Chile, southern Argentina
