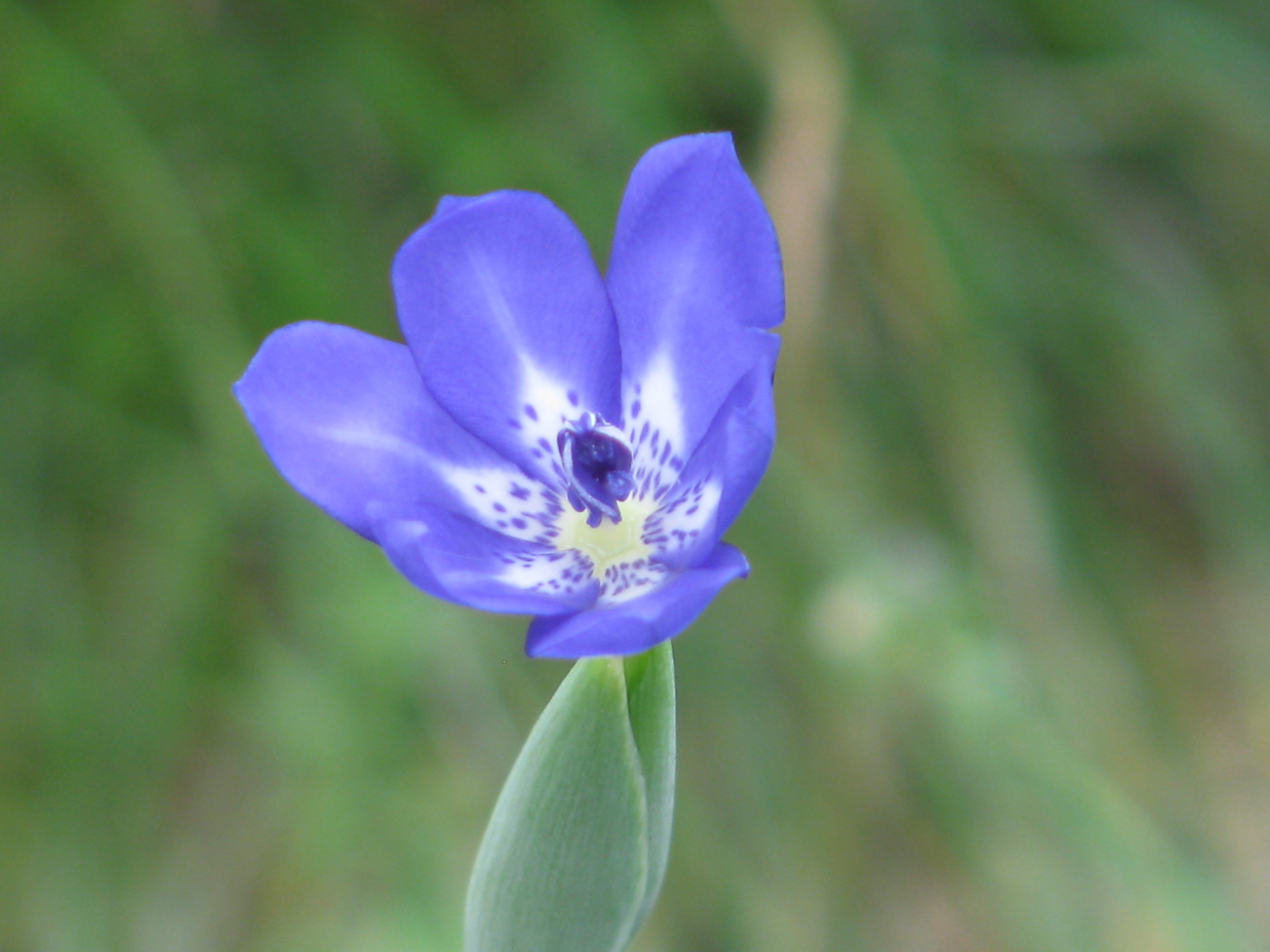
- Gelasine elongata

Scientific classification
- Kingdom: Plantae
- Clade: Embryophytes
- Clade: Tracheophytes
- Clade: Spermatophytes
- Clade: Angiosperms
- Clade: Monocots
- Order: Asparagales
- Family: Iridaceae
- Subfamily: Iridoideae
- Tribe: Tigridieae
- Genus: Gelasine; Herb.

Type species
- Gelasine azurea Herb.

Synonyms
- Sphenostigma Baker

= Gelasine =

Genus of flowering plants

Gelasine is a genus of flowering plants in the family Iridaceae, first described in 1840. The entire group is native to South America.

The genus name is derived from the Greek word gelasînos, meaning "dimple".

== Species ==
Image	Scientific name	Distribution
	Gelasine caldensis Ravenna	Minas Gerais
	Gelasine coerulea (Vell.) Ravenna	Paraguay, southeastern Brazil, Misiones Province of Argentina
	Gelasine elongata (Graham) Ravenna	southern Brazil, Urubual, northeastern Argentina
	Gelasine gigantea Ravenna	central Brazil
	Gelasine goodspeediana (R.C.Foster) Celis & Goldblatt	Bolivia
	Gelasine paranaensis Ravenna	Paraná State in southern Brazil
	Gelasine rigida Ravenna	Minas Gerais
	Gelasine uruguaiensis Ravenna	Uruguay
