= Style (botany) =

Part of a flower

Diagram of a blooming flower showing the position of the style

In botany, the style of an angiosperm flower is an organ of variable length that connects the ovary to the stigma. The style does not contain ovules; these are limited to the region of the gynoecium (female organs of the flower) called the "ovary".

== Structure ==
The style is a narrow extension of the ovary, usually pointing upwards, connecting the ovary to the stigmatic papillae. It may be absent in some plants; in this case, it is referred to as a sessile stigma. Styles resemble long tubes. The style can be open (with few cells occupying the central part, or even none), featuring a central canal that may be filled with mucilage. Alternatively, the style can be closed (completely filled with cells). Most plants with syncarpous pistils (monocotyledons and some eudicotys) have open styles, whereas many eudicots and grasses have closed (solid) styles containing specialized secretory tissues, which connect the stigma to the center of the ovary.

When the pistil consists of several carpels, each of them may have a distinct stylodium (sometimes seen as a pseudo-style) or share a common style. In Iris and other species of the Iridaceae family, the style divides into three "petaloid branches" (resembling petals), sometimes also called stylodiums, almost at the origin of the style and is called "tribrachiate". These are strips of tissue emerging from the perianth tube above the sepal. The stigma is a ridge or edge on the lower surface of the branch, near the tip of the lobes. Branched styles also appear in the genera Dietes, Iris, and in most species of the genus Moraea.

In Crocus species, the style is branched into three "branches," forming a tube. Plants of the genus Hesperantha have a spread-out branched style. The style can also be lobed rather than branched. Plants of the genus Gladiolus have a bilobed style. In the genera Freesia, Lapeirousia, Romulea, Savannosiphon, and Watsonia, the style has bifurcated and curved branches.

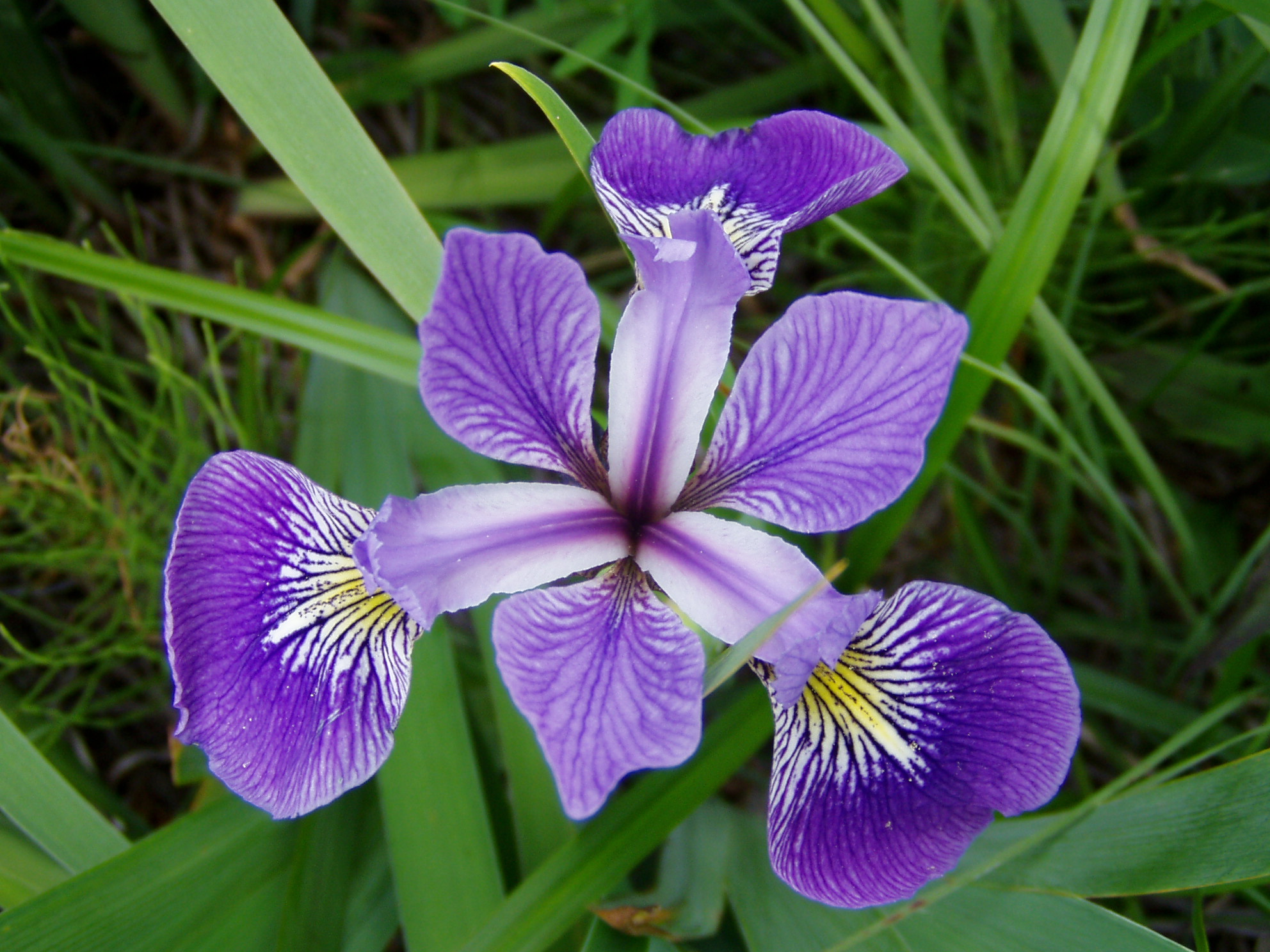
Flower of the Iris versicolor showing three overlapping two-lipped structures, an upper petaloid branching, and a lower tepal, enclosing a stamen.

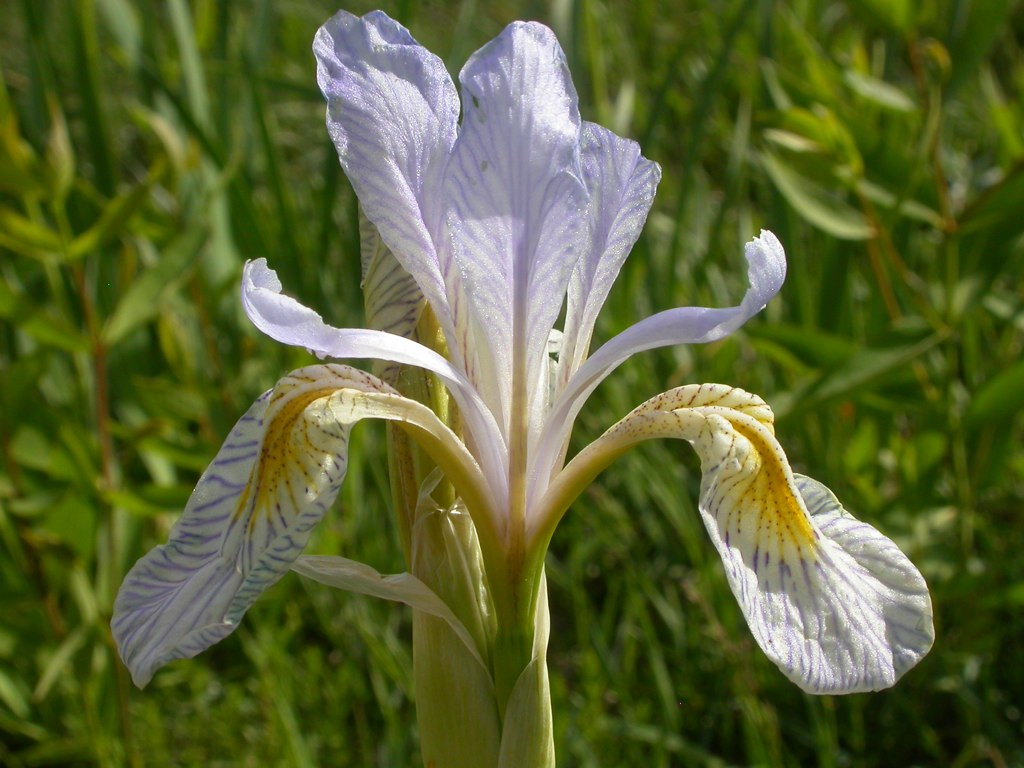
Flower of Iris missouriensis showing the light blue branched style above the drooping petal.

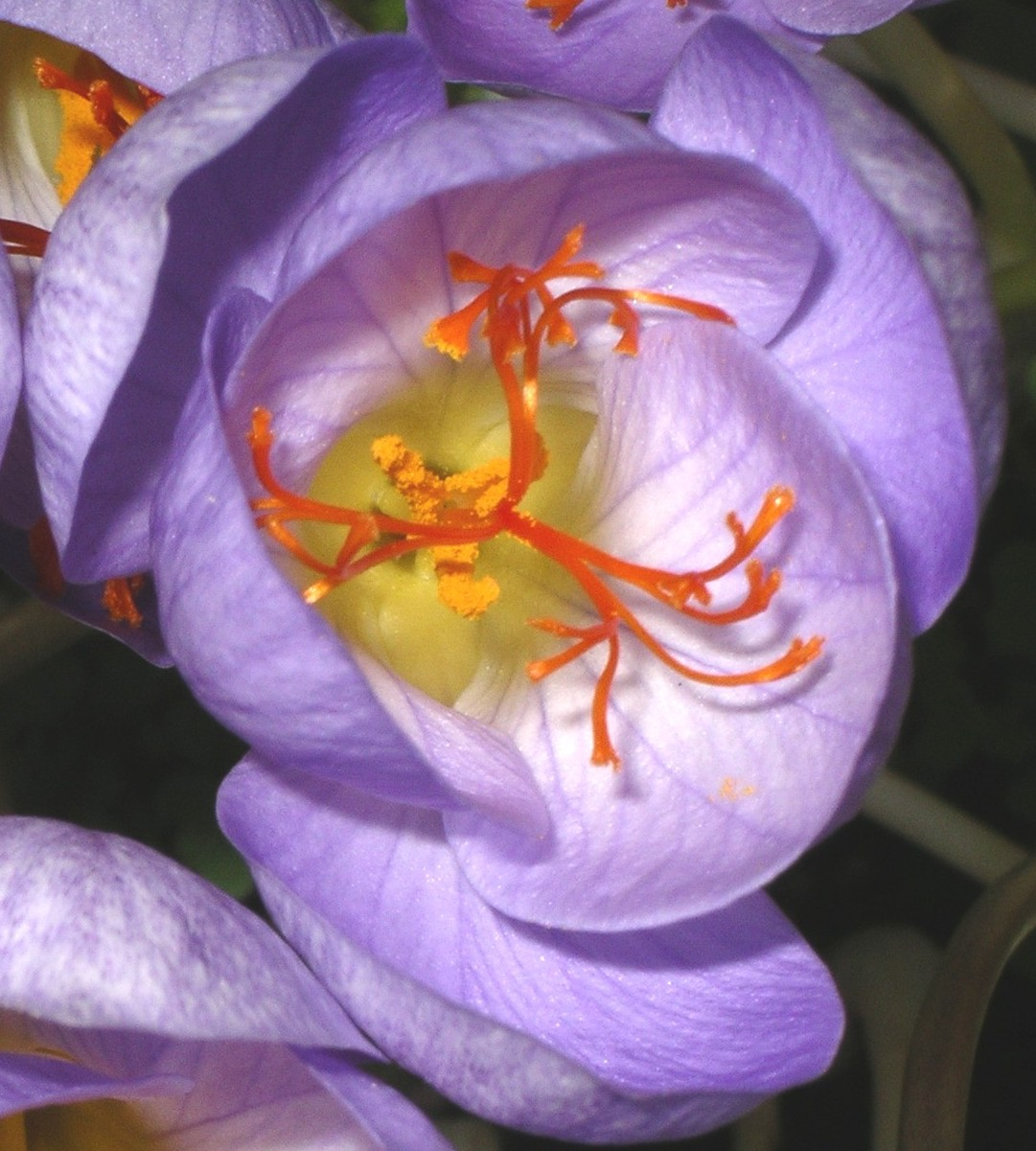
The feathery stigma of Iris versicolor (Crocus speciosus) has three branches corresponding to the three carpels.

=== Attachment to the ovary ===
Style position

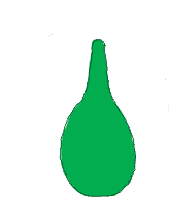
Terminal (apical)

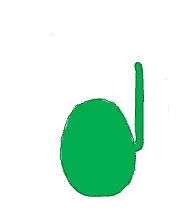
Lateral

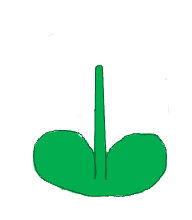
Gynobasic

May be terminal (apical), subapical, lateral, gynobasic, or subgynobasic. Terminal (apical) style position refers to attachment at the apex of the ovary and is the most common pattern. In the subapical pattern, the style arises to the side slightly below the apex. A lateral style arises from the side of the ovary and is found in Rosaceae. The gynobasic style arises from the base of the ovary, or between the ovary lobes and is characteristic of Boraginaceae. Subgynobasic styles characterise Allium.

=== Pollination ===
Pollen tubes grow the length of the style to reach the ovules, and in some cases self-incompatibility reactions in the style prevent full growth of the pollen tubes. In some species, including Gasteria at least, the pollen tube is directed to the micropyle of the ovule by the style.

== Sources ==
- Rudall, P.J. (2007). Anatomy of Flowering Plants: An Introduction to Structure and Development. Cambridge University Press. ISBN 978-1-139-45948-8.
- Simpson, Michael G. (2011). Plant Systematics. Academic Press. ISBN 978-0-08-051404-8.
