= C. guatemalensis =

C. guatemalensis may refer to:

- Clidemia guatemalensis, a plant species in the genus Clidemia
- Cobana guatemalensis, a plant species found in Honduras and Guatemala
- Croton guatemalensis, the copalchi, a plant species
- Cupania guatemalensis, a plant species in the genus Cupania

== See also ==
- Guatemalensis
