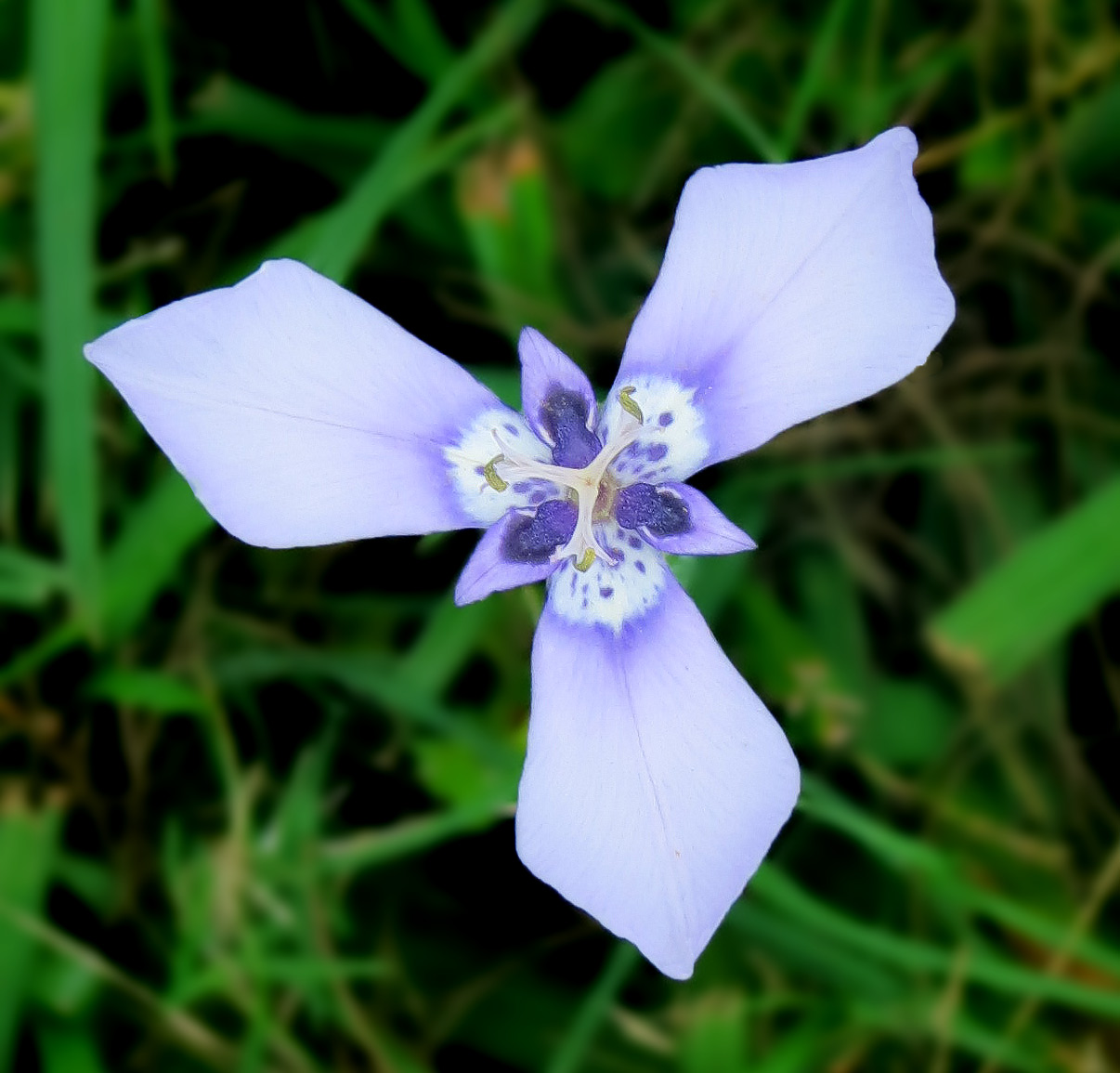
- Herbertia lahue

Scientific classification
- Kingdom: Plantae
- Clade: Tracheophytes
- Clade: Angiosperms
- Clade: Monocots
- Order: Asparagales
- Family: Iridaceae
- Subfamily: Iridoideae
- Tribe: Tigridieae
- Genus: Herbertia; Sweet

Type species
- Herbertia pulchella Sweet

Synonyms
- Sympa Ravenna; Trifurcia Herb.

= Herbertia (plant) =

Genus of flowering plants

Herbertia is a small genus of herbaceous, perennial and bulbous plants in the family Iridaceae.

== Description ==
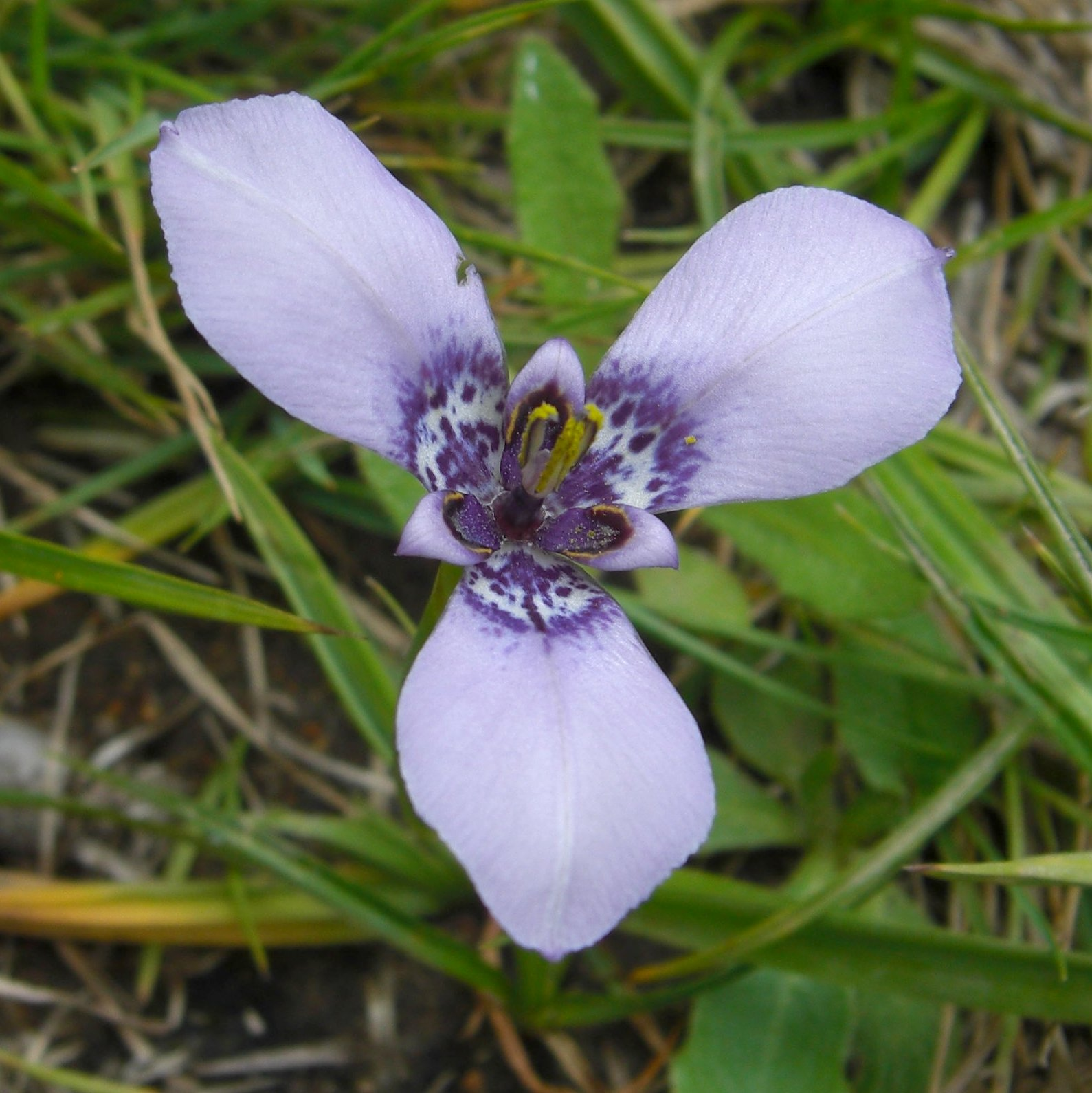
Prairie nymph -- Herbertia lahue

Herbaceous and perennial plants, from tunicate, ovoid bulbs with brown, dry, brittle and papery tunics. The stems are simple or branched. The leaves are few, with the basal ones larger than the others; the blade is pleated, linear-lanceolate.

== Taxonomy ==
Herbertia consists of 8 accepted species. One of them is native to southeastern + south-central United States, while the others are distributed in South America. The genus is closely related to Alophia, Cypella, and Tigridia.

The name of the genus is dedicated to William Herbert (1778–1847), a prominent British botanist and specialist in bulbous plants.

Species

- Herbertia amatorum C.H.Wright - Uruguay
- Herbertia darwinii Roitman & J.A.Castillo - Rio Grande do Sul State in Brazil, Corrientes Province in Argentina
- Herbertia furcata (Klatt) Ravenna - Uruguay, southern Brazil, Misiones Province in Argentina
- Herbertia hauthalii (Kuntze) K.Schum. - Paraguay
- Herbertia lahue (Molina) Goldblatt - southern Brazil, northern Argentina, central Chile, Uruguay, southern United States (Texas, Louisiana, Mississippi, Florida Panhandle)
- Herbertia pulchella Sweet - Colombia, Venezuela, Bolivia, Uruguay, southern Brazil, northern Chile, Salta Province in Argentina
- Herbertia quareimana Ravenna - Uruguay, southern Brazil
- Herbertia tigridioides (Hicken) Goldblatt - Bolivia, northern Argentina
- Herbertia zebrina Deble - Rio Grande do Sul State in Brazil
