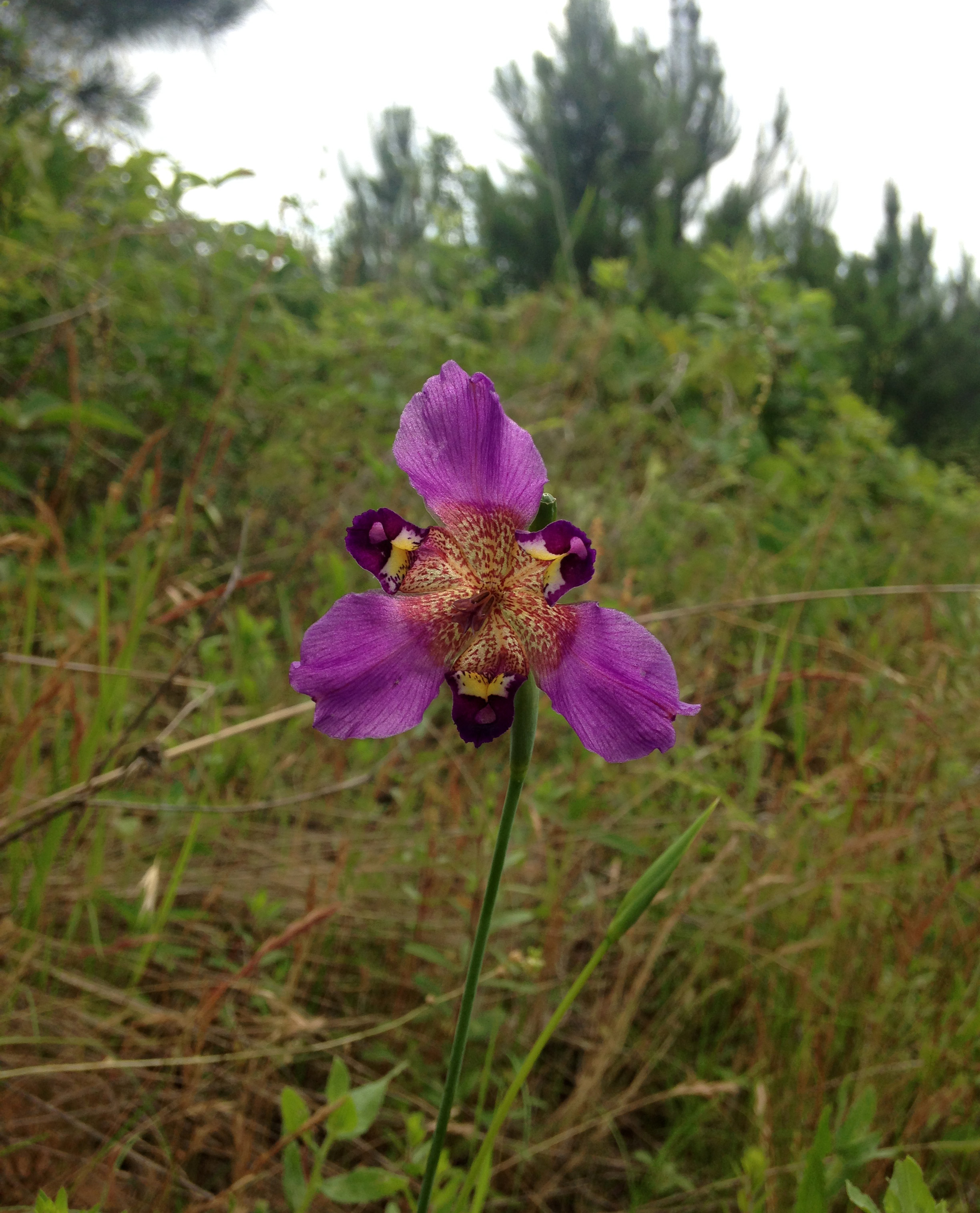

Scientific classification
- Kingdom: Plantae
- Clade: Embryophytes
- Clade: Tracheophytes
- Clade: Spermatophytes
- Clade: Angiosperms
- Clade: Monocots
- Order: Asparagales
- Family: Iridaceae
- Genus: Alophia
- Species: A. drummondii

Binomial name
- Alophia drummondii (Graham) R.C.Foster

= Alophia drummondii =

Species of flowering plant

Alophia drummondii, commonly called propeller flower, is a species of flowering plant in the family Iridaceae. It is native to the North and South America, where it ranges from the U.S. states of Arkansas and Oklahoma southward into Mexico. There is also an apparent disjunct population in Guyana.

Its natural habitat is in sandy soils of open prairies and woodlands, often growing around partially shaded forest edges.

Alophia drummondii is an herbaceous perennial with a bulbous base. Its leaves are linear-lanceolate and folded along the midrib. Each plant produces a few flowers, which only last a single day. Its tepals are dark purple with a yellow and reddish-brown base. It typically blooms from May to July.
