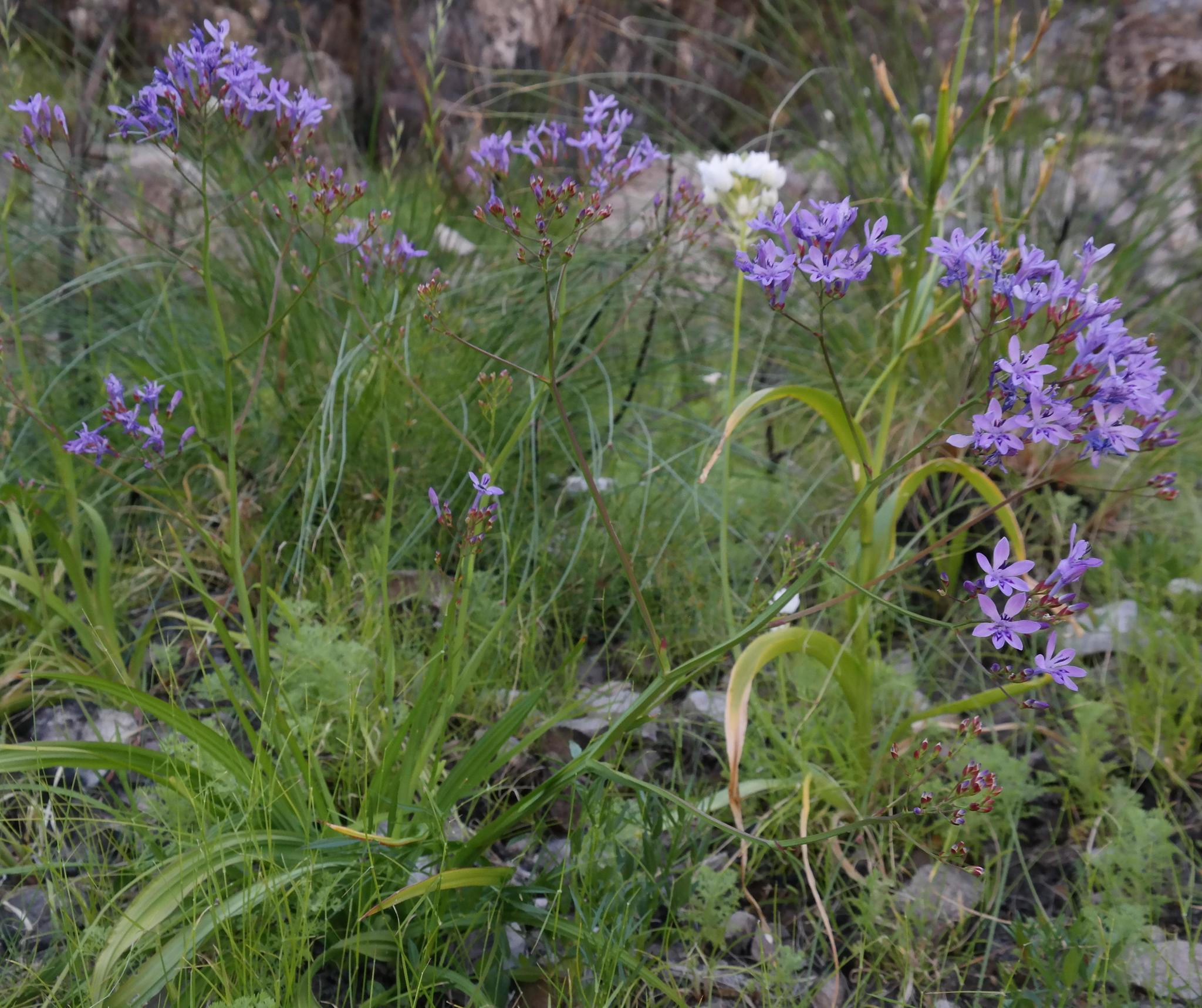

Scientific classification
- Kingdom: Plantae
- Clade: Tracheophytes
- Clade: Angiosperms
- Clade: Monocots
- Order: Asparagales
- Family: Iridaceae
- Subfamily: Crocoideae
- Tribe: Watsonieae
- Genus: Schizorhiza; Goldblatt & J.C.Manning
- Species: S. neglecta

Binomial name
- Schizorhiza neglecta (Goldblatt) Goldblatt & J.C.Manning

Synonyms
- Lapeirousia neglecta Goldblatt (1992) (basionym); Lapeirousia corymbosa subsp. alta Goldblatt

= Schizorhiza neglecta =

Species of flowering plant

Schizorhiza neglecta is a species of flowering plant in the iris family. It is a tuberous geophyte endemic to the southwestern Cape Provinces of South Africa. It is the sole species in genus Schizorhiza.
