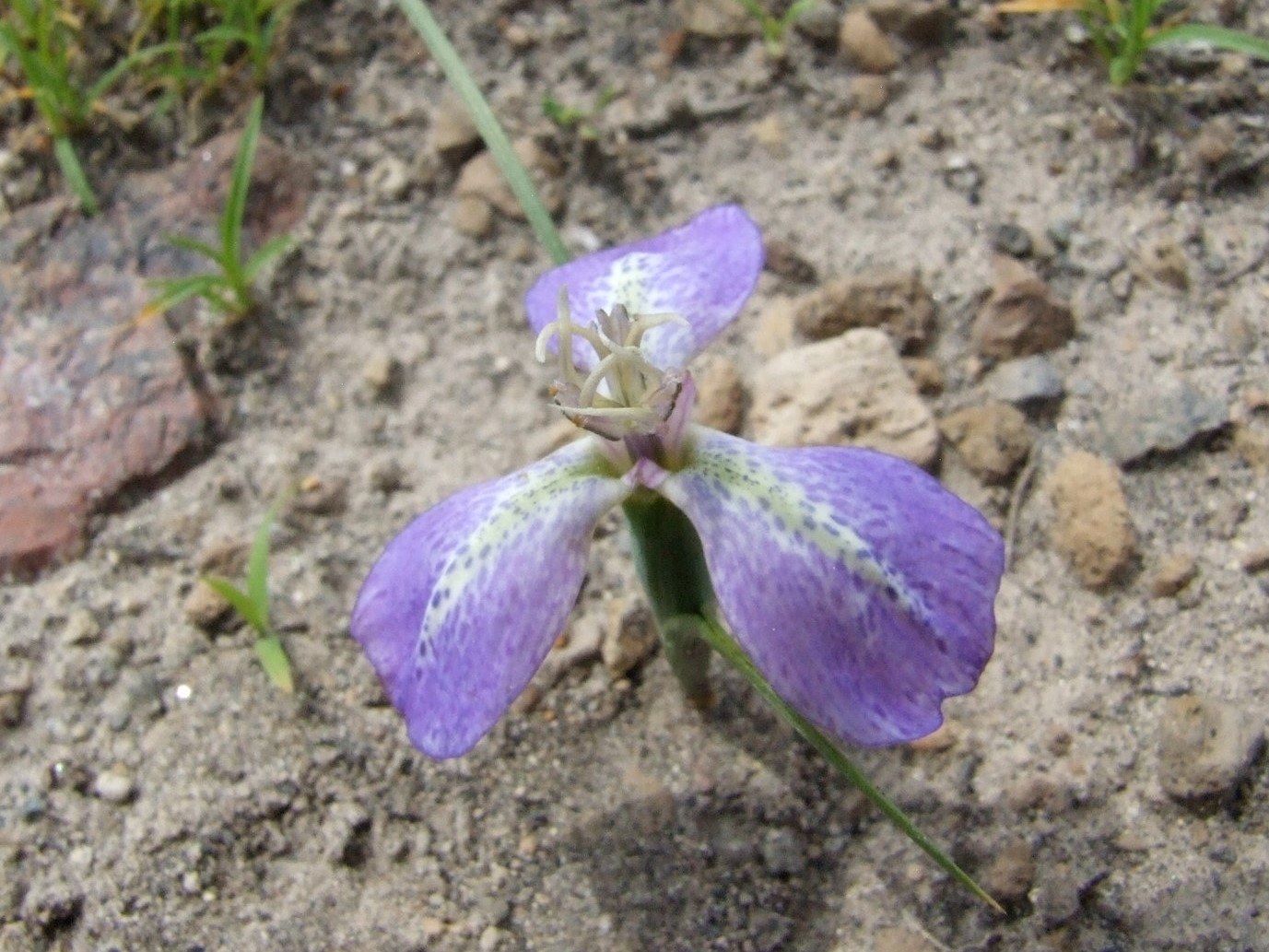
- Mastigostyla hoppii

Scientific classification
- Kingdom: Plantae
- Clade: Embryophytes
- Clade: Tracheophytes
- Clade: Spermatophytes
- Clade: Angiosperms
- Clade: Monocots
- Order: Asparagales
- Family: Iridaceae
- Subfamily: Iridoideae
- Tribe: Tigridieae
- Genus: Mastigostyla; I.M. Johnston

Type species
- Mastigostyla cyrtophylla I.M. Johnston

Synonyms
- Cardenanthus R.C.Foster

= Mastigostyla =

Genus of flowering plants

Mastigostyla is a genus of flowering plants in the family Iridaceae, first described as a genus in 1928. The entire group is native to South America. The genus name is derived from the Greek words mastigos, meaning "whip", and stylos, meaning "style".

Species

- Mastigostyla boliviensis (R.C.Foster) Goldblatt - Bolivia
- Mastigostyla brachiandra Ravenna - Argentina (Salta)
- Mastigostyla brevicaulis (Baker) R.C.Foster - Bolivia
- Mastigostyla cabrerae R.C.Foster - Argentina (Jujuy, Salta)
- Mastigostyla candaravensis Ravenna - Peru (Tacna)
- Mastigostyla cardenasii R.C.Foster - Bolivia, Peru (Cusco)
- Mastigostyla chuquisacensis Huaylla & Wilkin - Bolivia
- Mastigostyla cyrtophylla I.M.Johnst. - Peru (Arequipa)
- Mastigostyla gracilis R.C.Foster - Chile, Bolivia
- Mastigostyla herrerae (Vargas) Ravenna - Peru (Cusco)
- Mastigostyla hoppii R.C.Foster - Peru (Arequipa)
- Mastigostyla humilis Ravenna - Peru (Cusco)
- Mastigostyla implicata Ravenna - Argentina (Jujuy)
- Mastigostyla johnstonii R.C.Foster - Argentina (Tucumán)
- Mastigostyla longituba (R.C.Foster) Ravenna - Bolivia
- Mastigostyla macbridei (R.C.Foster) Ravenna - Peru (Lima, Junín)
- Mastigostyla major Ravenna, Revista Inst. Munic. Bot. 2: 56 (1964). - Peru (Apurímac, Ayacucho)
- Mastigostyla mirabilis Ravenna - Argentina (Tucumán)
- Mastigostyla orurensis (R.C.Foster) Ravenna - Bolivia
- Mastigostyla peruviana R.C.Foster - Peru (Apurímac)
- Mastigostyla potosina R.C.Foster - Bolivia
- Mastigostyla shepardiae (R.C.Foster) Ravenna - Peru (Puno)
- Mastigostyla spathacea (Griseb.) Ravenna - northern Argentina
- Mastigostyla torotoroensis Huaylla & Wilkin - Bolivia
- Mastigostyla tunariensis (R.C.Foster) Ravenna - Bolivia
- Mastigostyla venturii (R.C.Foster) Ravenna - Argentina (Jujuy, Tucumán)
- Mastigostyla woodii Huaylla & Wilkin - Bolivia
