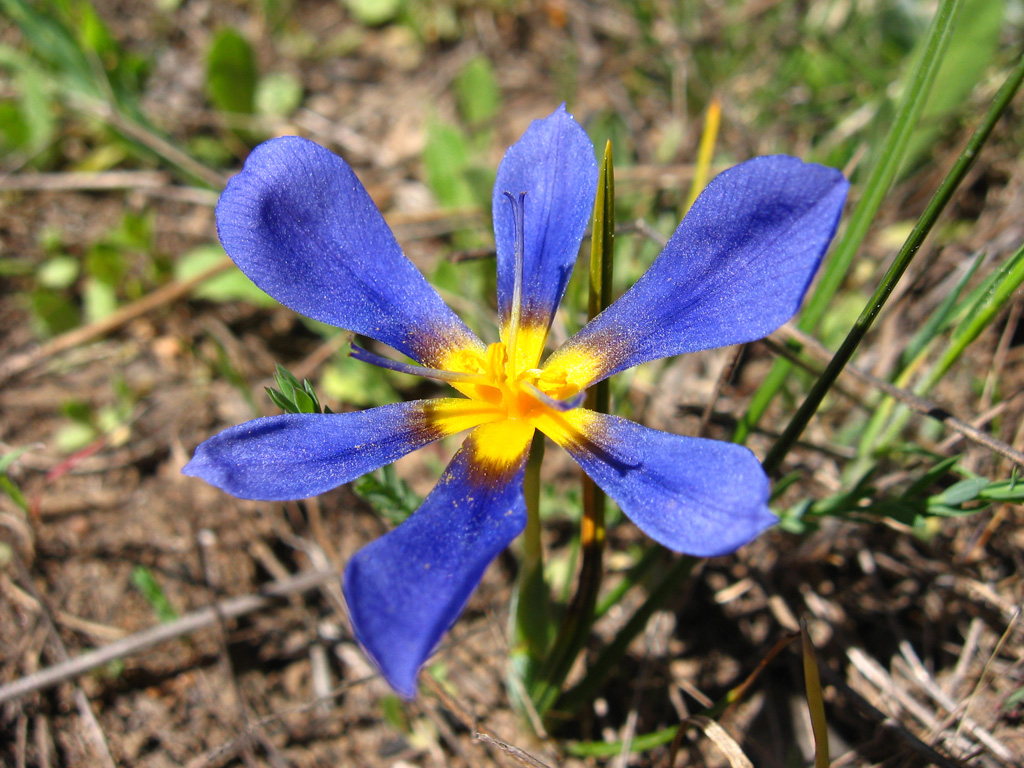
- Calydorea xiphioides

Scientific classification
- Kingdom: Plantae
- Clade: Tracheophytes
- Clade: Angiosperms
- Clade: Monocots
- Order: Asparagales
- Family: Iridaceae
- Subfamily: Iridoideae
- Tribe: Tigridieae
- Genus: Calydorea; Herb.

Type species
- Calydorea speciosa (J.D. Hooker) Herbert

Synonyms
- Botherbe Steud. ex Klatt; Catila Ravenna; Itysa Ravenna; Roterbe Klatt; Tamia Ravenna

= Calydorea =

Genus of flowering plants

Calydorea is a small genus of perennial, herbaceous and bulbous plants in the family Iridaceae native to Mexico and South America. The plants in the genus are small with tunicated bulbs. The flowers are light blue, violet, white, or yellow, depending on the species, of which there are around twenty. Taxonomists considered that the already known genera Salpingostylis (endemic from Florida), Cardiostigma (from Mexico), Catila (from Brazil) and Itysa (from Venezuela) are not enough different from each other to justify their taxonomic segregation and, for this reason, all of them are now included in Calydorea.

The genus name is derived from the Greek words caly, meaning "sheathed", and dorea, meaning "spear". C. xiphioides lends its common name, tahay, to the exoplanet Gliese 367 b.

== Species ==
The following species are accepted by Plants of the World Online.

- Calydorea alba Roitman & A.Castillo, Bol. Soc. Argent. Bot. 40: 311 (2005). Uruguay.
- Calydorea amabilis (Ravenna) Goldblatt & Henrich, Ann. Missouri Bot. Gard. 78: 511 (1991). Southern Brazil to North Eastern Argentina. (Syn.: Catila amabilis Ravenna)
- Calydorea approximata R.C.Foster, Contr. Gray Herb. 155: 46 (1945). Bolivia to North Eastern Argentina.
- Calydorea azurea Klatt, Abh. Naturf. Ges. Halle 15: 387 (1882). Bolivia to Uruguay.
- Calydorea basaltica Ravenna, Onira 10: 40 (2005). Brazil (Paraná).
- Calydorea bifida Ravenna, Onira 9: 23 (2003). Chile (Maule).
- Calydorea campestris (Klatt) Baker, J. Bot. 14: 187 (1876). Brazil to Bolivia.
- Calydorea charruana Deble Balduinia 40: 2 (2013). Brazil (Rio Grande do Sul) to Uruguay.
- Calydorea cipuroides Klatt, Abh. Naturf. Ges. Halle 15: 387 (1882). Colombia to Venezuela.
- Calydorea crocoides Ravenna, Bol. Soc. Argent. Bot. 10: 311 (1965). South Eastern and Southern Brazil.
- Calydorea gardneri Baker, J. Bot. 14: 188 (1876). Brazil (Piauí, Mato Grosso).
- Calydorea longipes Ravenna, Onira 10: 41 (2005). Brazil (Paraná).
- Calydorea luteola (Klatt) Baker, J. Bot. 14: 188 (1876). S. Brazil.
- Calydorea minima Roitman & J.A.Castillo, Bol. Soc. Argent. Bot. 42: 321 (2007). Paraguay to Argentina (Corrientes Province).
- Calydorea minuana Deble & F.S.Alves Phytotaxa 253: 82 (2016). Uruguay.
- Calydorea nuda (Herb.) Baker, J. Bot. 14: 188 (1876). Uruguay.
- Calydorea pallens Griseb., Abh. Königl. Ges. Wiss. Göttingen 24: 324 (1879). Northern Argentina.
- Calydorea riograndensis Deble Bonplandia (Corrientes) 20: 36 (2011). Brazil (Rio Grande do Sul).
- Calydorea undulata Ravenna, Onira 6: 14 (2001). Argentina (Córdoba).
- Calydorea venezolensis (Ravenna) Goldblatt & Henrich, Ann. Missouri Bot. Gard. 78: 511 (1991). Venezuela. (syn.: Itysa venezolensis Ravenna)
- Calydorea xiphioides (Poepp.) Espinosa, Revista Chilena Hist. Nat. 26: 18 (1922). Central Chile.

=== Former species ===
Species formerly included in Calydorea but now recognized as better placed in other genera include the following.

- Calydorea chilensis Muñoz-Schick, Gayana, Bot. 60: 104 (2003). Chile (Maule). Synonym of Romulea rosea var. rosea.
- Calydorea longispatha (Herb.) Baker, J. Bot. 14: 188 (1876). Central and South Western Mexico. Synonym of Tigridia longispatha.
- Calydorea mexicana (R.C.Foster) Goldblatt & Henrich, Ann. Missouri Bot. Gard. 78: 510 (1991). Mexico (Mexico State). Synonym of Tigridia fosteri.

== Bibliography ==
- Goldblatt, P. & J.E. Henrich. 1991. Calydorea Herbert (Iridaceae-Tigridieae): Notes on this New World genus and reduction to synonymy of Salpingostylis, Cardiostigma, Itysa and Catila. Annals of the Missouri Botanical Garden 78: 504-511
- Muñoz-Schick, M. Tres nuevas Monocotiledóneas descubiertas en Chile: Alstroemeria mollensis M.Muñoz et A.Brinck (Alstroemeriaceae), Miersia chilensis var. bicolor M.Muñoz (Gilliesiaceae) y Calydorea chilensis M.Muñoz (Iridaceae). Gayana Bot., 2003, vol.60, no.2, p.101-106.
- Roitman, G. & Castillo, A. Calydorea alba (Iridaceae, Tigrideae), a new species from Uruguay. Boletín Sociedad Argentina Botánica. 40 (3-4) 2005.
