= Larentia =

Larentia may refer to:

- Acca Larentia, Hercules' mistress or the adoptive mother of Romulus and Remus in Roman mythology
- Larentia (moth), a geometer moth genus
- Larentia (plant), a plant genus in the iris family
