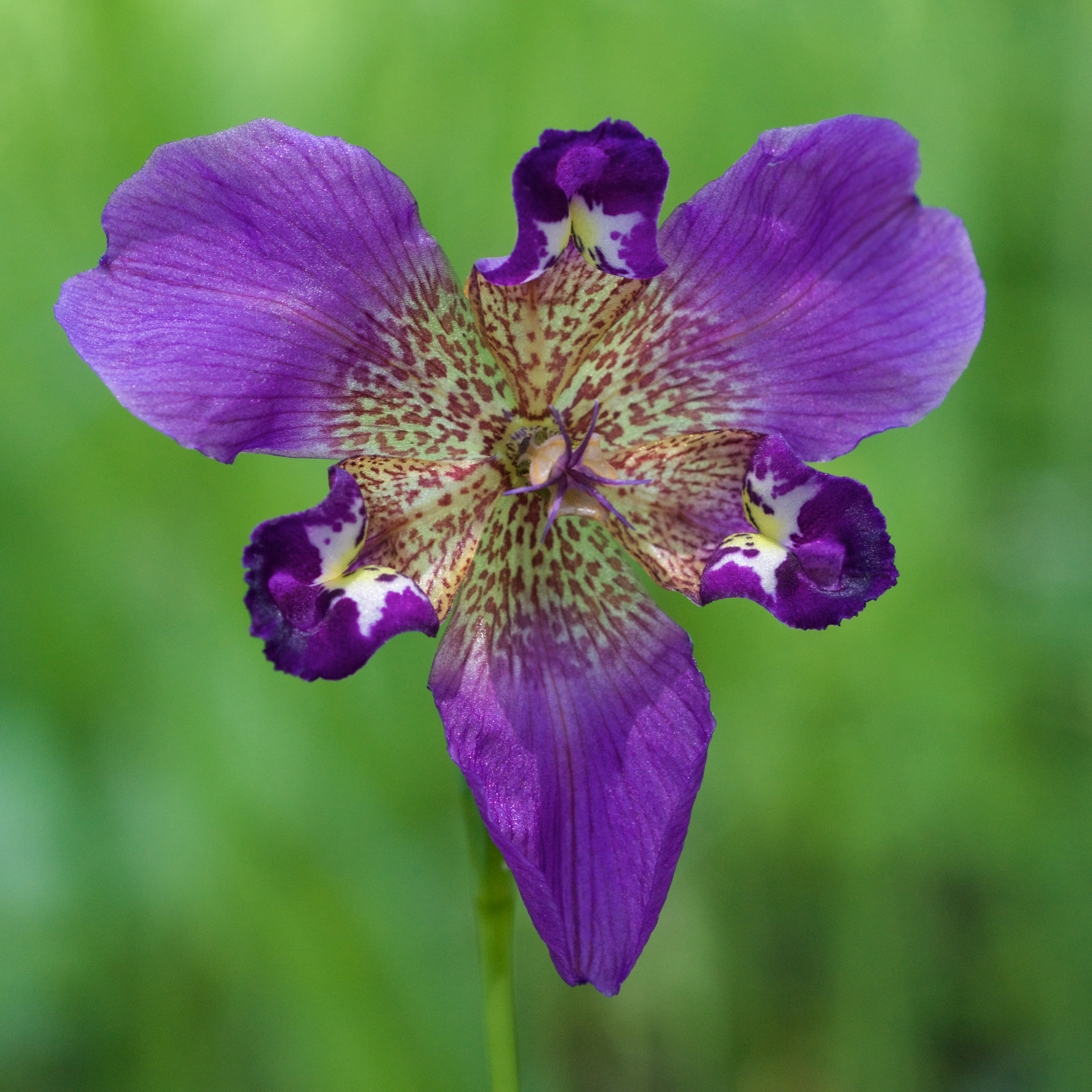
- Alophia drummondii

Scientific classification
- Kingdom: Plantae
- Clade: Tracheophytes
- Clade: Angiosperms
- Clade: Monocots
- Order: Asparagales
- Family: Iridaceae
- Subfamily: Iridoideae
- Tribe: Tigridieae
- Genus: Alophia; Herb.

Type species
- Alophia drummondii (Graham) Herbert

Synonyms
- Eustylis Engelm. & A.Gray

= Alophia =

Genus of flowering plants

Alophia is a small genus of perennial, herbaceous and bulbous plants in the family Iridaceae. The genus comprise five known species that occur from the South-central United States as well as in Mexico, Central America, and parts of South America.

The genus is closely related to Herbertia, Cypella and Tigridia, differentiating from them by some characters of the stamen and the gynoecium. The genus name is derived from the Greek words a-, meaning "without", and lophos, meaning "crest".

Species

- Alophia drummondii (Graham) R.C.Foster, Contr. Gray Herb. 155: 34 (1945). South-central United States to Mexico, Guyana and Bolivia
- Alophia intermedia (Ravenna) Goldblatt, Brittonia 27: 384 (1975 publ. 1976). NW Mexico. (Sinaloa).
- Alophia medusa (Baker) Goldblatt, Brittonia 27: 384 (1975 publ. 1976). Brazil (Goiás)
- Alophia silvestris (Loes.) Goldblatt, Brittonia 27: 384 (1975 publ. 1976). Southern Mexico to Costa Rica
- Alophia veracruzana Goldblatt & T.M.Howard, Ann. Missouri Bot. Gard. 79: 903 (1992). Mexico (Veracruz)
