= Tucma =

Tucma may refer to:

- a synonym for Ennealophus, a flowering plant genus
- Tucma (fly), a fly genus in the family Sphaeroceridae
