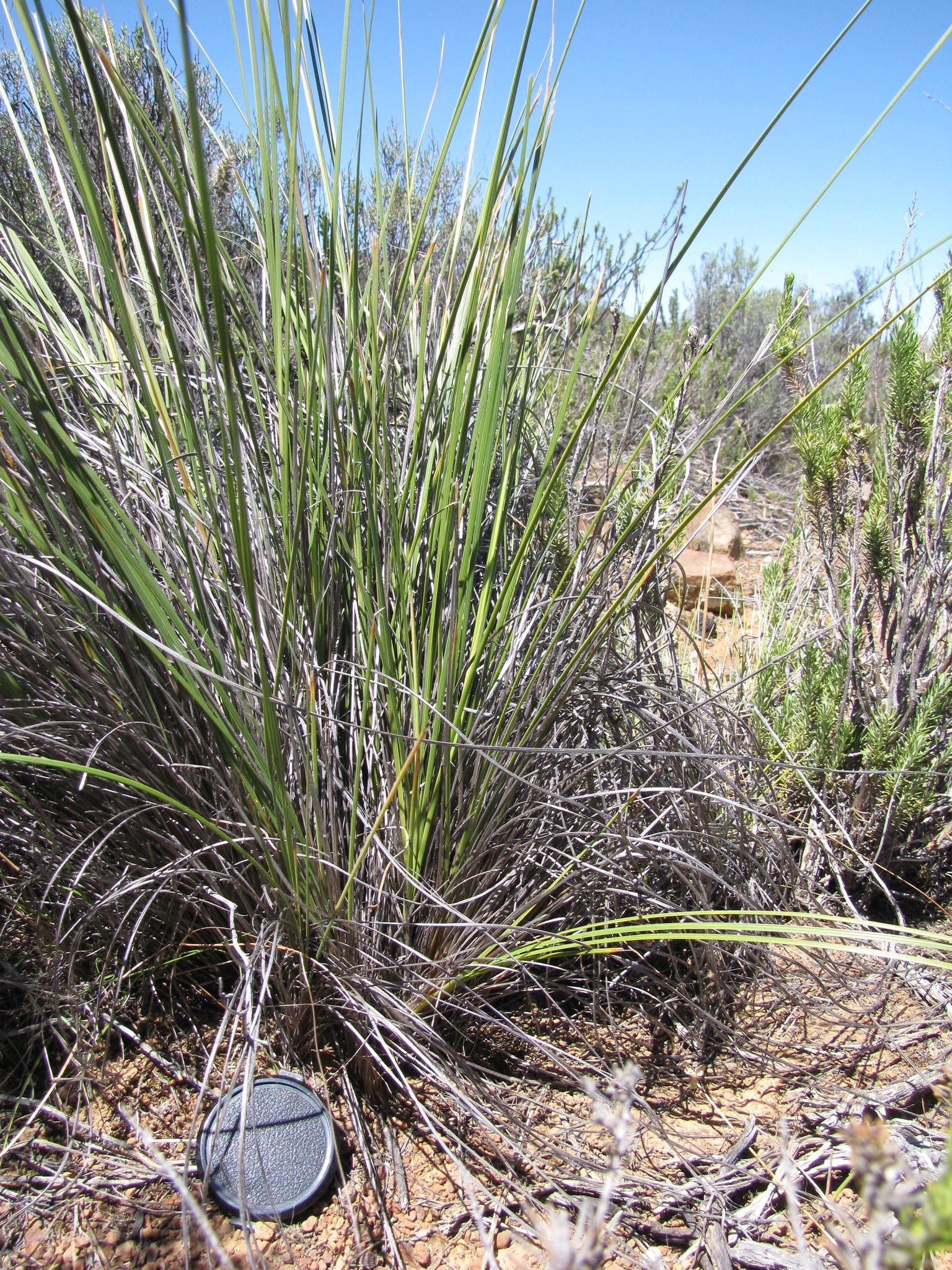

Scientific classification
- Kingdom: Plantae
- Clade: Tracheophytes
- Clade: Angiosperms
- Clade: Monocots
- Order: Asparagales
- Family: Iridaceae
- Subfamily: Crocoideae
- Tribe: Freesieae
- Genus: Devia; Goldblatt & J.C.Manning
- Species: D. xeromorpha

Binomial name
- Devia xeromorpha Goldblatt & J.C.Manning

= Devia xeromorpha =

Species of flowering plant

Devia is a genus of plants in the family Iridaceae first described in 1990. It contains only one known species, Devia xeromorpha, endemic to the southwestern part of Cape Province in South Africa. The genus was named in honour of the South African botanist and academic, Miriam Phoebe de Vos.
