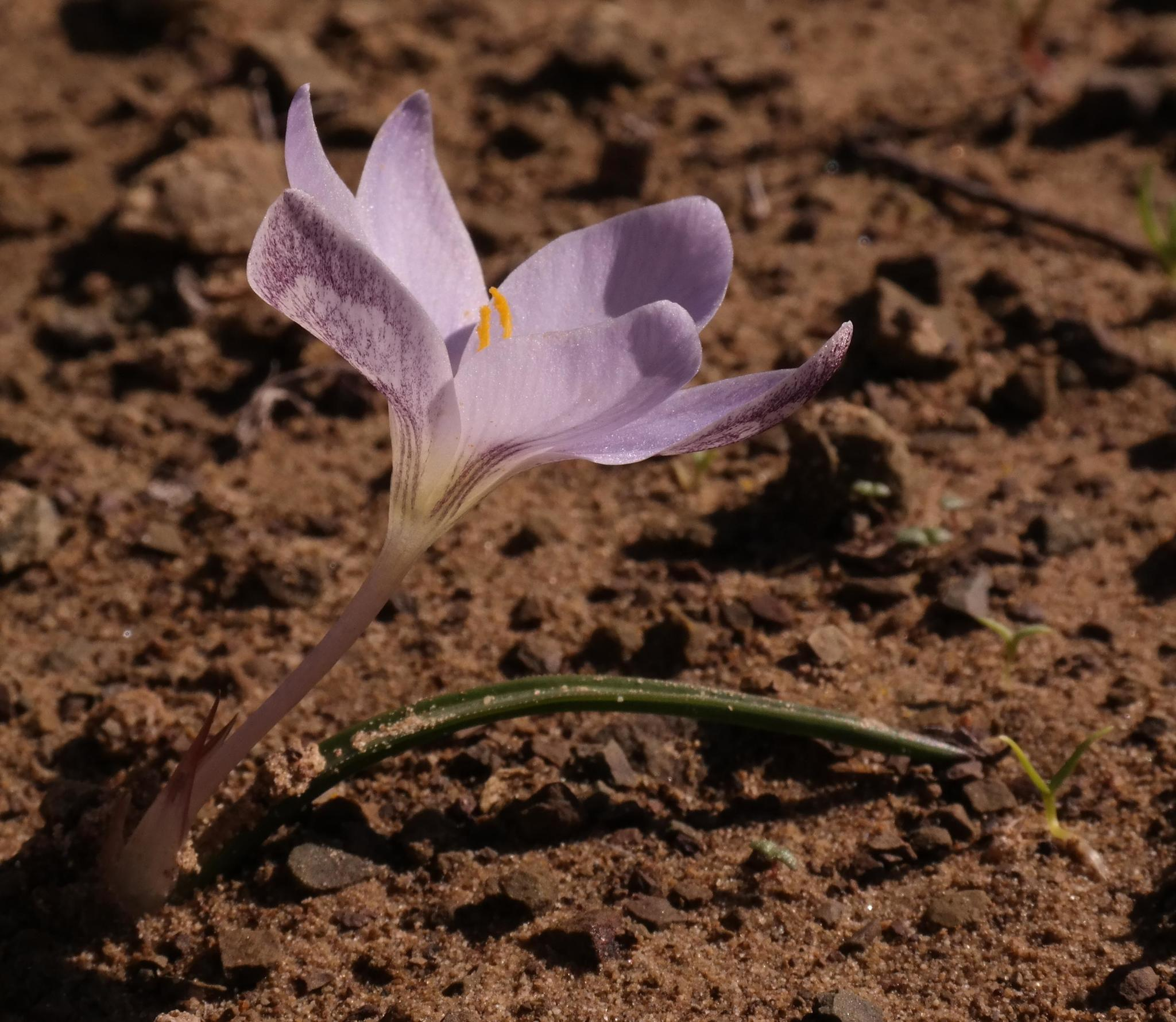

Conservation status
- Least Concern (SANBI Red List)

Scientific classification
- Kingdom: Plantae
- Clade: Tracheophytes
- Clade: Angiosperms
- Clade: Monocots
- Order: Asparagales
- Family: Iridaceae
- Subfamily: Crocoideae
- Tribe: Croceae
- Genus: Afrocrocus; J.C.Manning & Goldblatt
- Species: A. unifolius

Binomial name
- Afrocrocus unifolius (Goldblatt) Goldblatt & J.C.Manning

Synonyms
- Syringodea unifolia Goldblatt

= Afrocrocus =

Genus of flowering plants

Afrocrocus is a genus of flowering plants in the family Iridaceae. It is a monotypic genus, containing the single species Afrocrocus unifolius. It is a tuberous geophyte native to the west-central and southwestern Cape Provinces of South Africa. It ranges from Hantamsberg at Calvinia in Northern Cape Province southwards across the Roggeveld Escarpment to the Hex River Mountains in Western Cape. It grows on well-drained clay flats and shale bands in fynbos and Succulent Karoo habitats.

The genus name alludes to the African distribution and its resemblance to the genus Crocus.
