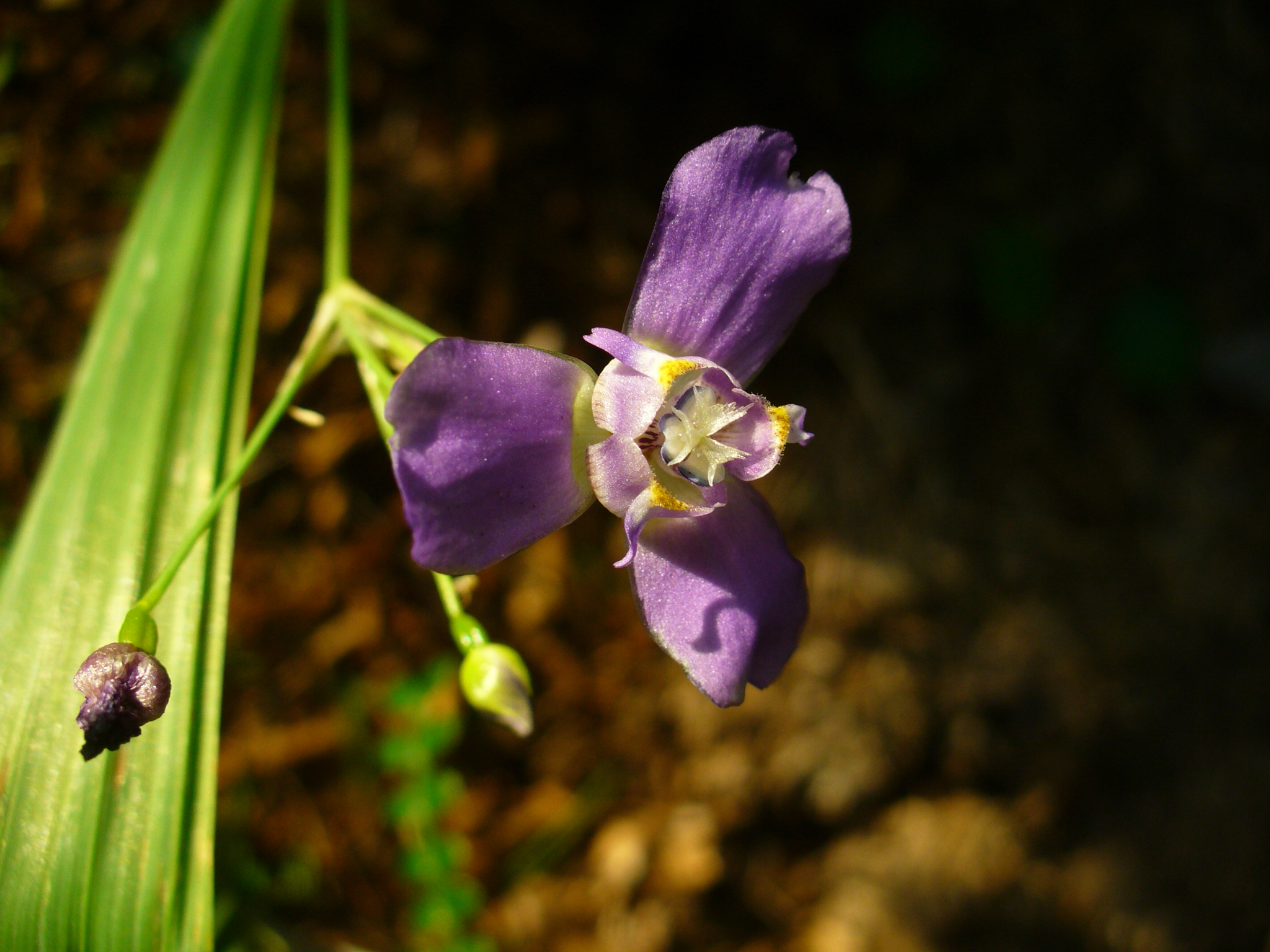
- Ennealophus euryandrus

Scientific classification
- Kingdom: Plantae
- Clade: Tracheophytes
- Clade: Angiosperms
- Clade: Monocots
- Order: Asparagales
- Family: Iridaceae
- Subfamily: Iridoideae
- Tribe: Tigridieae
- Genus: Ennealophus; N.E.Br.

Type species
- Ennealophus amazonicus N.E.Br.

Species
- See text

= Ennealophus =

Genus of flowering plants

Ennealophus is a genus of perennial, herbaceous and bulbous plants in the family Iridaceae. It consists in five species distributed from Ecuador to Northern Brazil and Northwest Argentina. The genus name is derived from the Greek words ennea, meaning "nine", and lophus, meaning "crest".

== List of species ==
The species of the genus and their geographic distribution is the following:

- Ennealophus boliviensis (Baker) Ravenna, Notas Mens. Mus. Nac. Hist. Nat. (Chile) 21: 8 (1977). Bolivia.
- Ennealophus euryandrus (Griseb.) Ravenna, Anales Mus. Hist. Nat. Valparaiso 6: 42 (1973). Northwest Argentina.
- Ennealophus fimbriatus Ravenna, Wrightia 7: 232 (1983). Northwest de Argentina.
- Ennealophus foliosus (Kunth) Ravenna, Notas Mens. Mus. Nac. Hist. Nat. (Chile) 21: 8 (1977). Ecuador to Peru and Northern Brazil.
- Ennealophus simplex (Ravenna) Roitman & J.A.Castillo, Darwiniana 45: 238 (2007). Northwest Argentina (Jujuy, Tucumán). It is a synonym of Tucma simplex Ravenna.

== Bibliography ==
- Chiarini, Franco E. El cariotipo de Ennealophus fimbriatus (Iridaceae). Arnaldoa, ene./dic. 2005, vol.12, no.1-2, p. 48-52. ISSN 1815-8242.
- Ravenna P. 1983. A new species and a new subgenus in Ennealophus (Iridaceae). Wrightia, 7. (3): 232-234
