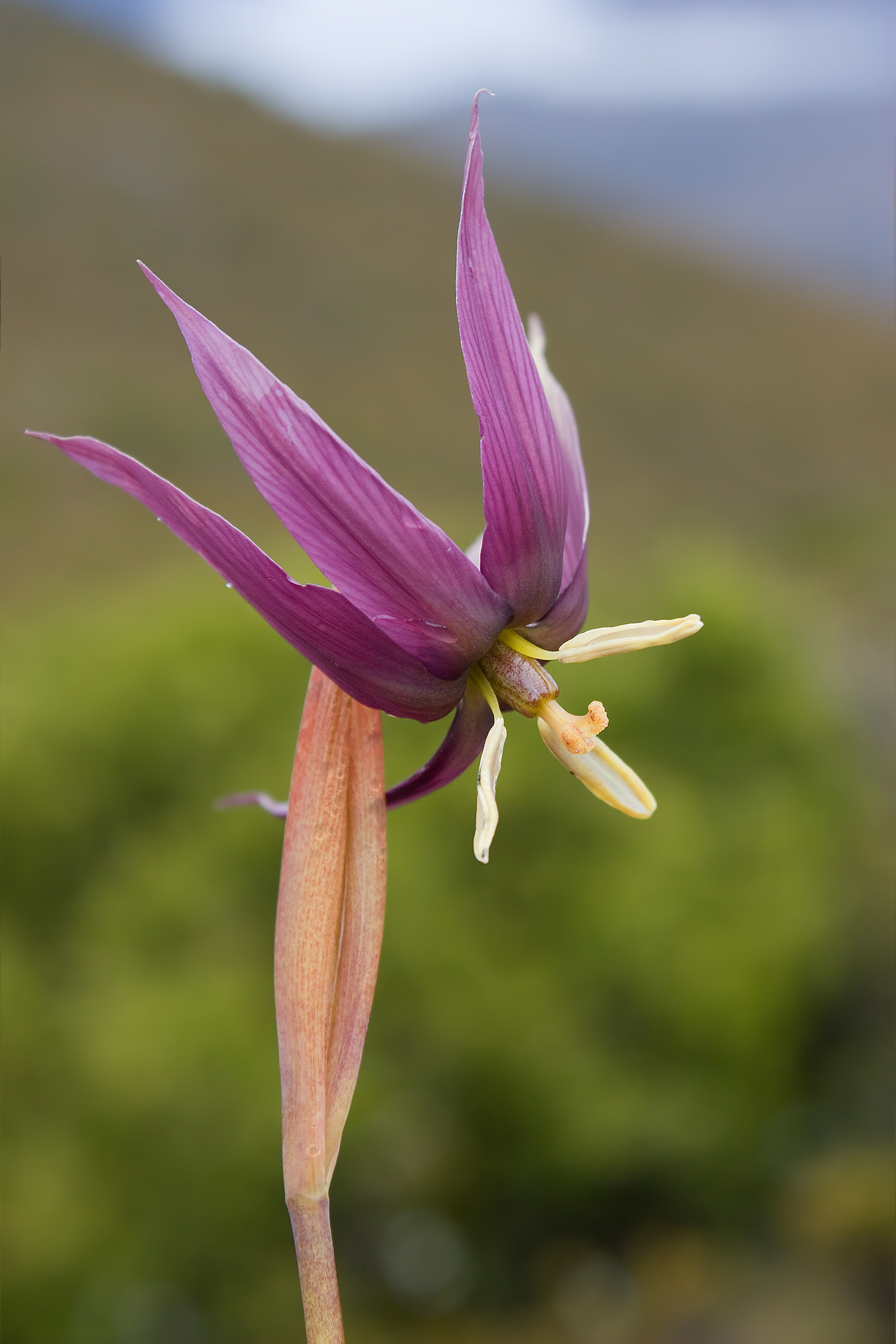
- Isophysis tasmanica, Mount Eliza, Southwest National Park

Scientific classification
- Kingdom: Plantae
- Clade: Tracheophytes
- Clade: Angiosperms
- Clade: Monocots
- Order: Asparagales
- Family: Iridaceae
- Subfamily: Isophysidoideae; Thorne & Reveal
- Genus: Isophysis; T.Moore
- Species: I. tasmanica

Binomial name
- Isophysis tasmanica (Hook.) T.Moore

Synonyms
- Hewardia tasmanica Hook.

= Isophysis =

Genus of flowering plants

Isophysis is a genus of herbaceous, perennial and rhizomatous plants in the Iris family (Iridaceae). A monotypic genus formerly known as Hewardia, it contains a single species, Isophysis tasmanica is a Palaeoendemic found only in the south-west of Tasmania.

The genus name is derived from the Greek words iso, meaning "equal", and physis, meaning "bladder".

== Habitat ==
Isophysis tasmanica is a dominant species within alpine sedge land. It is also found in coniferous, alpine, bolster and deciduous heathlands. It occurs from sea level to 1300m. The vegetation that it resides in is open in structure. It grows on highly siliceous rocks. It is often found on gravel slopes or rock crevices.

== Description ==
Isophysis tasmanica is a tufted plant with smooth leaves that come from a woody underground rhizome. The leaves are 5–30 cm long and 3–5 mm wide. The leaves are linear and persist in fans. The scape is erect, terete and unbranched, the scrape can be 40 cm high. Up the scape there are one to three smaller leaves that wrap around the stem. Below the flower, a pair of spath-bracts (modified leaves) that enclose the solitary terminal flower are brown or purple. The flower is purple and can be almost black but they are sometimes yellow. The petals are equal and 2.5–6 cm long 3–9 mm wide. These petals come together in a tube. It has a superior ovary with three flattened stamens. This superior ovary, distinguishes it from any other member of the Iridaceae. Plants in the Iridaceae family are usually distinguished by the "septal nectaries" this is tissue in an ovary that produces nectar, but these are not present within Isophyis tasmanica. This suggests that Isophyis tasmanica does not use nectar to attract pollinators.

The former genus name Hewardia is used as a landmark name in Tasmania's southwest wilderness such as Hewardia Ridge on Mt. Picton located near Pineapple flats, named after the Pineapple Grass.
