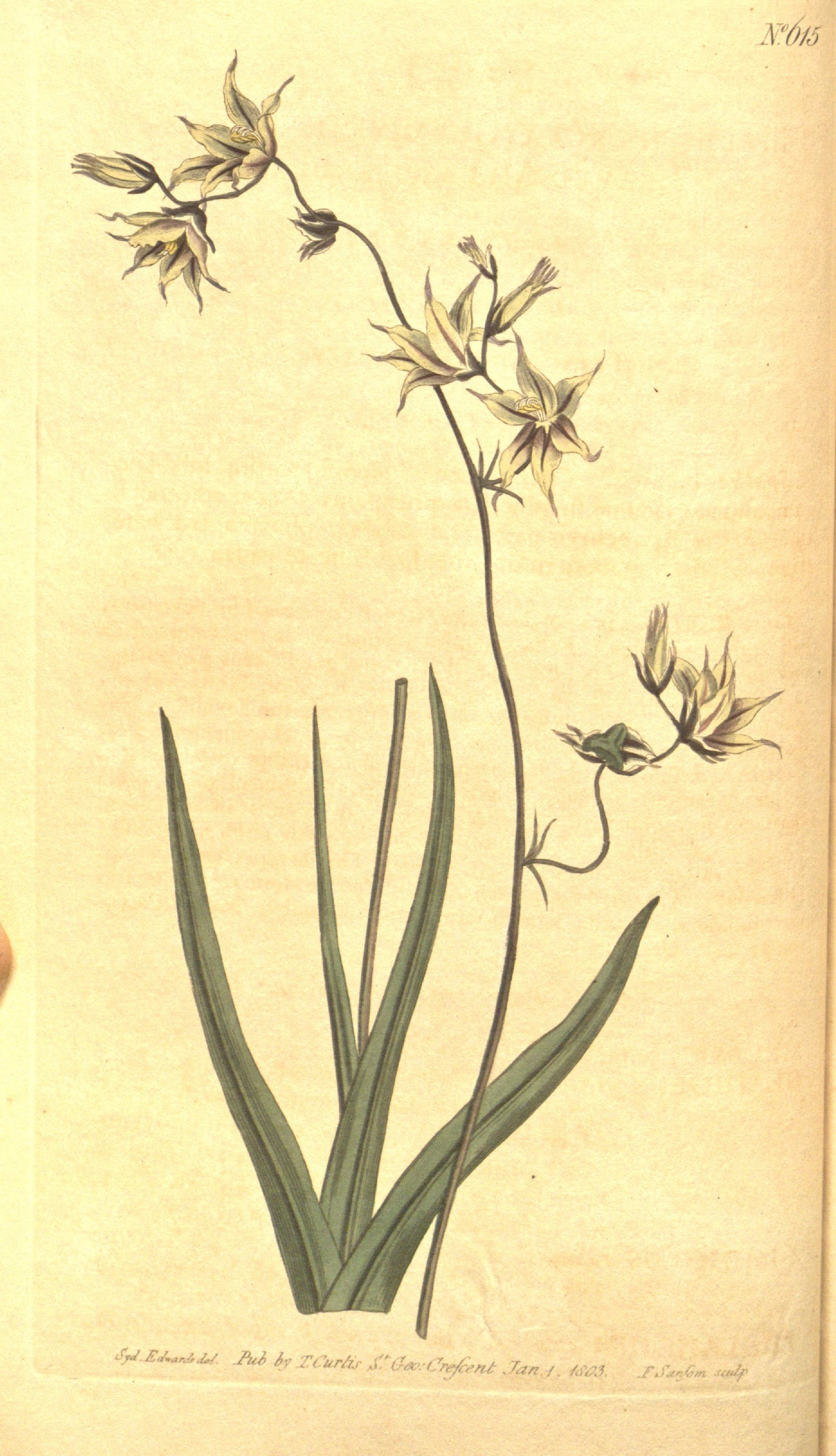

Scientific classification
- Kingdom: Plantae
- Clade: Tracheophytes
- Clade: Angiosperms
- Clade: Monocots
- Order: Asparagales
- Family: Iridaceae
- Subfamily: Crocoideae
- Tribe: Gladioleae
- Genus: Melasphaerula; Ker Gawl.
- Species: M. graminea

Binomial name
- Melasphaerula graminea (L.f.) Ker Gawl.

Synonyms
- Gladiolus gramineus L.f.; Diasia graminifolia DC.; Diasia iridifolia DC.; Melasphaerula intermedia Sweet; Melasphaerula parviflora G.Lodd.; Melasphaerula iridifolia Sweet; Diasia intermedia Heynh.; Diasia parviflora (G.Lodd.) Steud.

= Melasphaerula =

Genus of flowering plants

Melasphaerula is a genus of flowering plants in the family Iridaceae, first described as a genus in 1803. There is only one known species, Melasphaerula graminea, native to Namibia and the Cape Province in South Africa.

The genus name is derived from the Greek words melas, meaning "black", and sphaerulos, meaning "small sphere".

Some sources use the name Melasphaerula parviflora for the species, not accepting Melasphaerula graminea.
