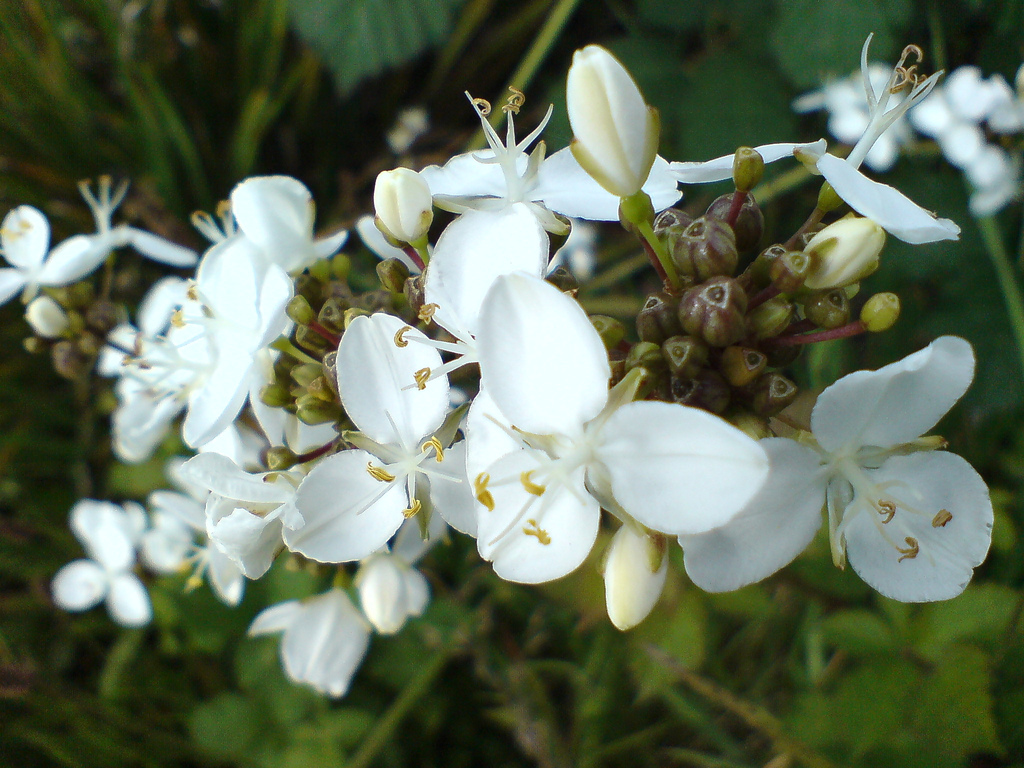
- Libertia chilensis

Scientific classification
- Kingdom: Plantae
- Clade: Tracheophytes
- Clade: Angiosperms
- Clade: Monocots
- Order: Asparagales
- Family: Iridaceae
- Subfamily: Iridoideae
- Tribe: Sisyrinchieae

Genera
- See text

= Sisyrinchieae =

Tribe of flowering plants

Sisyrinchieae is the second largest tribe in the subfamily Iridoideae. The group is included in the family Iridaceae. It contains many perennials which are widely distributed in the New World.

The leaves of the plants are sword-shaped or grass-like. The blooms appear in an inflorescence and have six tepals, which in most cases are identical, but in some genera like Diplarrena or Libertia, may differ. The ovary is 3-locular containing small seeds.

The members are sometimes used as ornamental plants. Some are endangered and endemic to specific regions but many are naturalized, including some species of Sisyrinchium, in the Old World and elsewhere.

List of genera

- Libertia
- Olsynium
- Orthrosanthus
- Sisyrinchium
- Solenomelus
- Tapeinia
