= Cobana =

Scientific classification
- Kingdom: Plantae
- Clade: Tracheophytes
- Clade: Angiosperms
- Clade: Monocots
- Order: Asparagales
- Family: Iridaceae
- Subfamily: Iridoideae
- Tribe: Tigridieae
- Genus: Cobana; Ravenna
- Species: C. guatemalensis

Binomial name
- Cobana guatemalensis (Standl.) Ravenna

Synonyms
- Eleutherine guatemalensis Standl.; Calydorea guatemalensis (Standl.) R.C.Foster

Genus of flowering plants

Cobana is a genus of herbaceous, perennial and bulbous plants in the family Iridaceae. A monotypic genus, it contains a single species, Cobana guatemalensis, distributed in Honduras and Guatemala.

== Bibliography ==
- Ravenna P. 1974. Cobana: a new genus of Central American Iridaceae. Bot. Notiser 127. (1): 104–108.
