= Cyanixia =

Conservation status
- Least Concern (IUCN 3.1)

Scientific classification
- Kingdom: Plantae
- Clade: Tracheophytes
- Clade: Angiosperms
- Clade: Monocots
- Order: Asparagales
- Family: Iridaceae
- Subfamily: Crocoideae
- Tribe: Watsonieae
- Genus: Cyanixia; Goldblatt & J.C.Manning
- Species: C. socotrana

Binomial name
- Cyanixia socotrana (Hook.f.) Goldblatt & J.C. Manning

Synonyms
- Babiana socotrana Hook.f.

Genus of flowering plants

Cyanixia is a genus of plants in the family of Iridaceae, first described in 2003. It contains only one known species, Cyanixia socotrana, a perennial, herbaceous and bulbous plant species endemic to the Island of Socotra in the Indian Ocean, part of the Republic of Yemen.

The genus name is derived from Greek words Ixia, referring to the radially symmetrical flowers in the genus of that name, as well as cyanos, meaning "blue". The species was for many years considered a member of the South African genus Babiana but recognized as a distinct genus in 2003.
