= Larentia (plant) =

Scientific classification
- Kingdom: Plantae
- Clade: Tracheophytes
- Clade: Angiosperms
- Clade: Monocots
- Order: Asparagales
- Family: Iridaceae
- Subfamily: Iridoideae
- Tribe: Tigridieae
- Genus: Larentia; Klatt

Synonyms
- Zygella S.Moore

Genus of flowering plants

Larentia is a genus of flowering plants in the family Iridaceae, first described as a genus in 1882. It is native to Mexico and South America.

Species

- Larentia linearis (Kunth) Klatt - Venezuela, Brazil, Bolivia, Paraguay
- Larentia mexicana (C.V.Morton & R.C.Foster) Goldblatt - southern Mexico
- Larentia rosei (R.C.Foster) Ravenna - western Mexico
