= Duthiastrum =

Scientific classification
- Kingdom: Plantae
- Clade: Tracheophytes
- Clade: Angiosperms
- Clade: Monocots
- Order: Asparagales
- Family: Iridaceae
- Subfamily: Crocoideae
- Tribe: Croceae
- Genus: Duthiastrum; M.P.de Vos
- Species: D. linifolium

Binomial name
- Duthiastrum linifolium (E.Phillips) M.P.de Vos

Synonyms
- Duthiella linifolia (E.Phillips) M.P.de Vos; Syringodea linifolia E.Phillips

Plant genus

Duthiastrum is a genus of plants in the Iridaceae. It contains only one species, Duthiastrum linifolium, endemic to South Africa (Cape Provinces, Free State, Northern Provinces).
