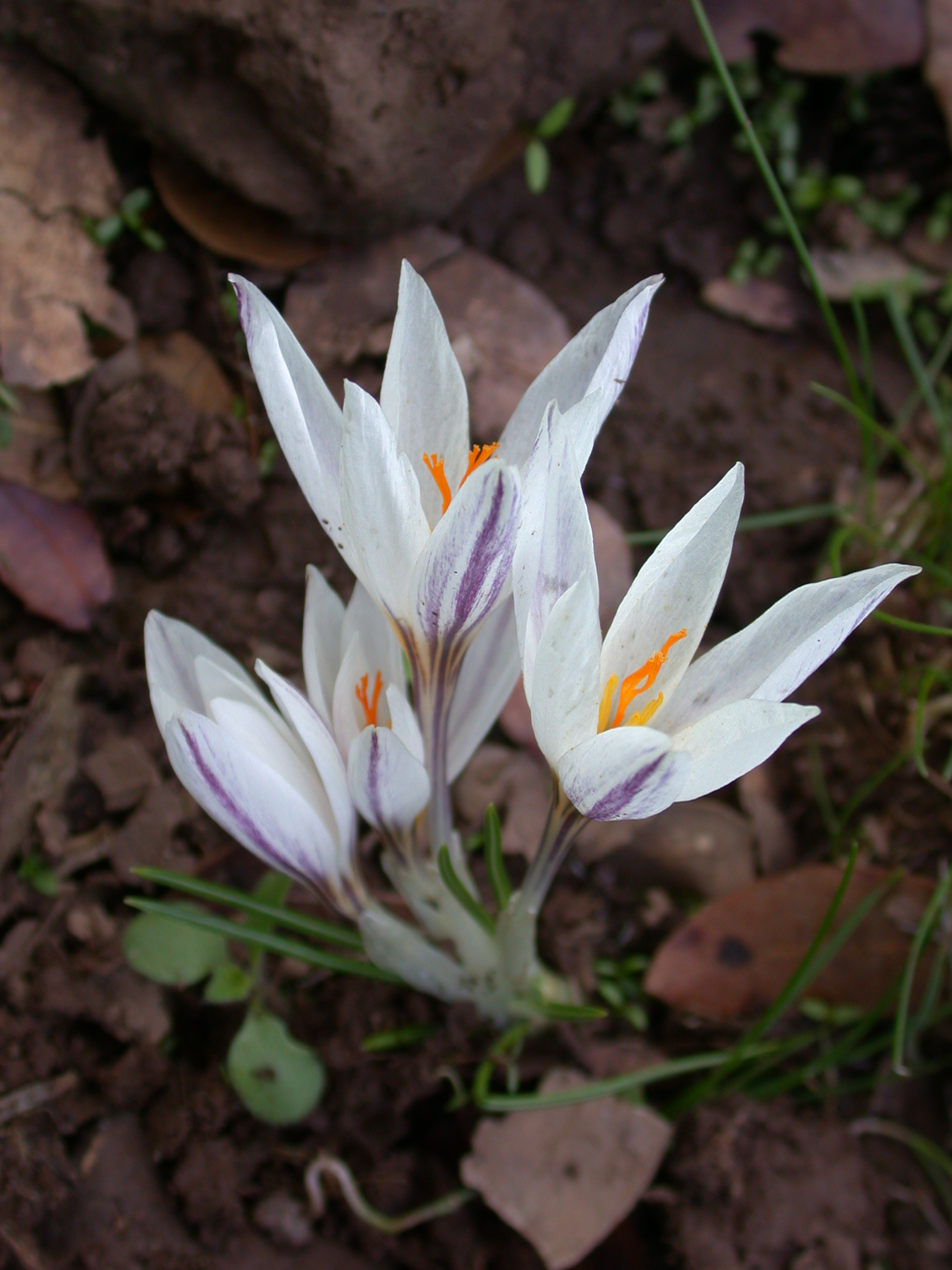

Scientific classification
- Kingdom: Plantae
- Clade: Tracheophytes
- Clade: Angiosperms
- Clade: Monocots
- Order: Asparagales
- Family: Iridaceae
- Genus: Crocus
- Species: C. aleppicus

Binomial name
- Crocus aleppicus Baker

= Crocus aleppicus =

Species of flowering plant

Crocus aleppicus is a species of flowering plant in the genus Crocus of the family Iridaceae, that is found from West Syria to the Palestine region.
