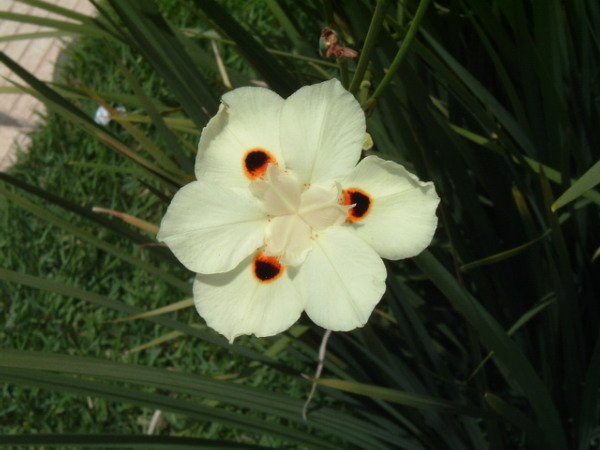
- Dietes bicolor

Scientific classification
- Kingdom: Plantae
- Clade: Tracheophytes
- Clade: Angiosperms
- Clade: Monocots
- Order: Asparagales
- Family: Iridaceae
- Subfamily: Iridoideae
- Tribe: Irideae; Kitt.

Genera
- See text

= Irideae =

Tribe of flowering plants

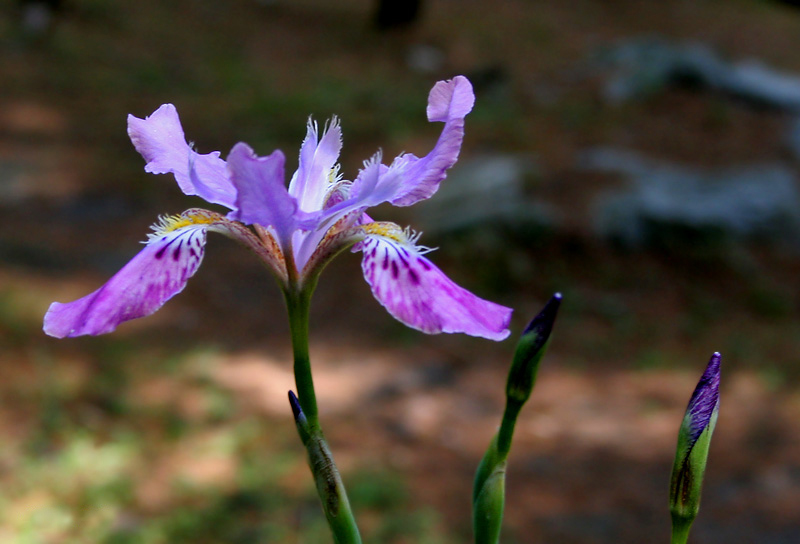
Iris milesii

Irideae is a tribe included in the well-known family Iridaceae. It contains many species in five genera which are widely distributed in the Old World. The tribe derives its name from Iris, which is the largest genus of the tribe.

The blooms, borne in an inflorescence and often scented, have six petals, these being identical only in the genus Ferraria. The ovary is 3-locular and contains seeds which are usually circular and pellet-like. Members of the tribe bear typically sword-shaped leaves and the rootstock is usually rhizome or corm. Only two subgenera of Iris have bulbs. These are Xiphium and Hermodactyloides.

Many of the species are popular ornamental plants, but many are threatened with extinction.

List of genera:

- Bobartia
- Dietes
- Ferraria
- Iris
- Moraea
