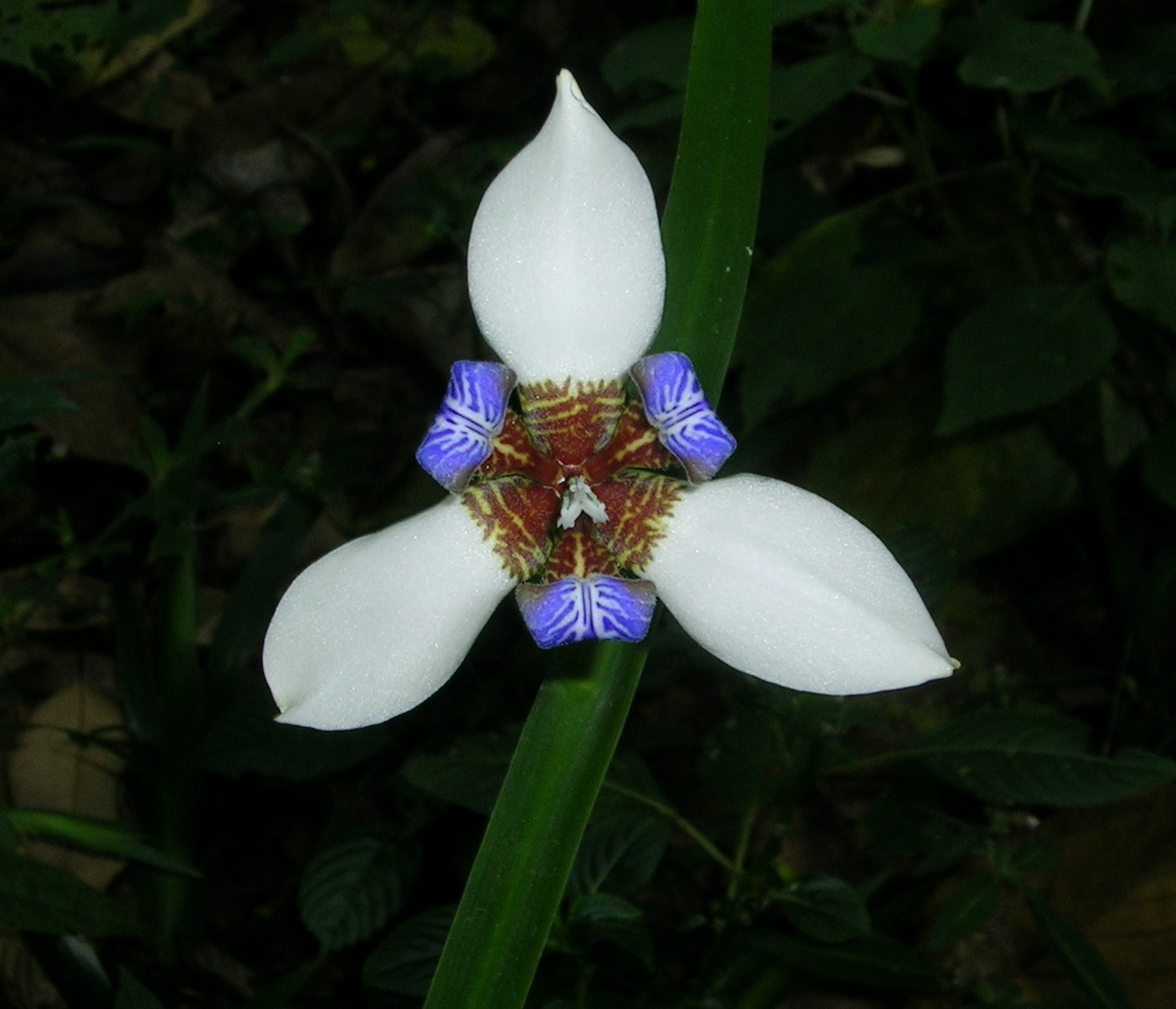
- Neomarica northiana

Scientific classification
- Kingdom: Plantae
- Clade: Tracheophytes
- Clade: Angiosperms
- Clade: Monocots
- Order: Asparagales
- Family: Iridaceae
- Subfamily: Iridoideae
- Tribe: Trimezieae; Ravenna

Genera
- See text

Synonyms
- Mariceae Hutchinson

= Trimezieae =

Tribe of flowering plants

Trimezieae is a tribe included in the subfamily Iridoideae of the family Iridaceae. It is the smallest tribe in this subfamily, containing only three closely related genera.

The species are widely distributed only in South and Central America. A big part of the members are native to Brazil. They represents tropical plants which grows mainly in moist environments.

The rootstock is a rhizome, the leaves are traditionally sword-shaped. The blooms are collected in inflorescence and contains six tepals. Three of them are different from the others. The ovary is 3-locular.

The plants have good ornamental traits but they are not very often used in cultivation. Some of them have more specific needs but some are much easier for growing. Sometimes these species are difficult to find.

List of genera:

- Neomarica
- Pseudotrimezia
- Trimezia
