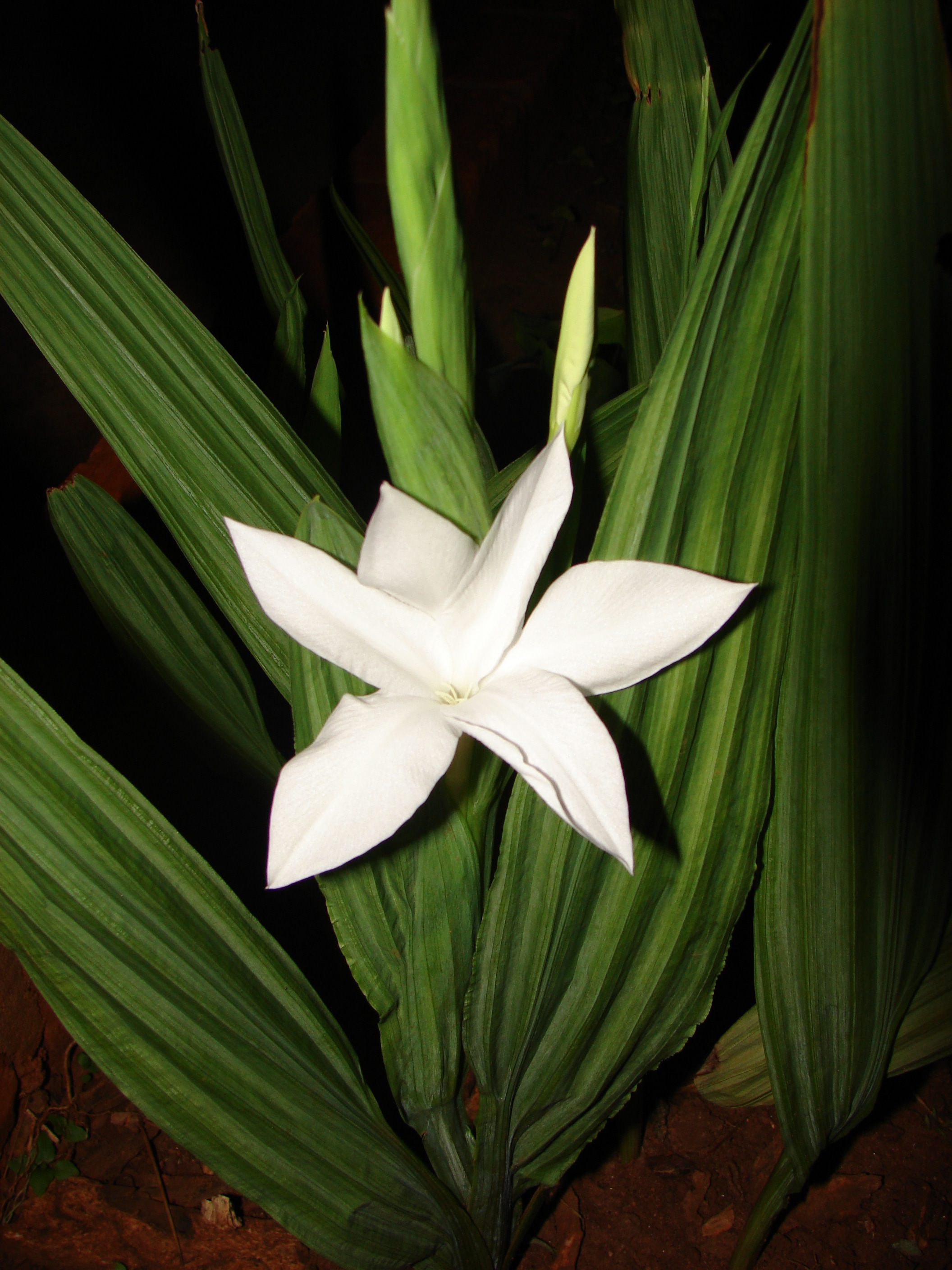

Scientific classification
- Kingdom: Plantae
- Clade: Tracheophytes
- Clade: Angiosperms
- Clade: Monocots
- Order: Asparagales
- Family: Iridaceae
- Subfamily: Crocoideae
- Tribe: Watsonieae
- Genus: Savannosiphon; Goldblatt & Marais
- Species: S. euryphylla

Binomial name
- Savannosiphon euryphylla (Harms) Goldblatt & Marais

Synonyms
- Acidanthera euryphylla (Harms) Diels; Lapeirousia euryphylla Harms

= Savannosiphon =

Genus of flowering plants

Savannosiphon is a flowering plant genus in the family Iridaceae, circumscribed in 1980. It contains a single species, Savannosiphon euryphylla, native to tropical Africa (Zaire, Tanzania, Malawi, Mozambique, and Zimbabwe).

The genus name, derived from the word "savanna" and the Greek word siphon (meaning "tube") alludes to its habitat and the structure of its perianth tube.
