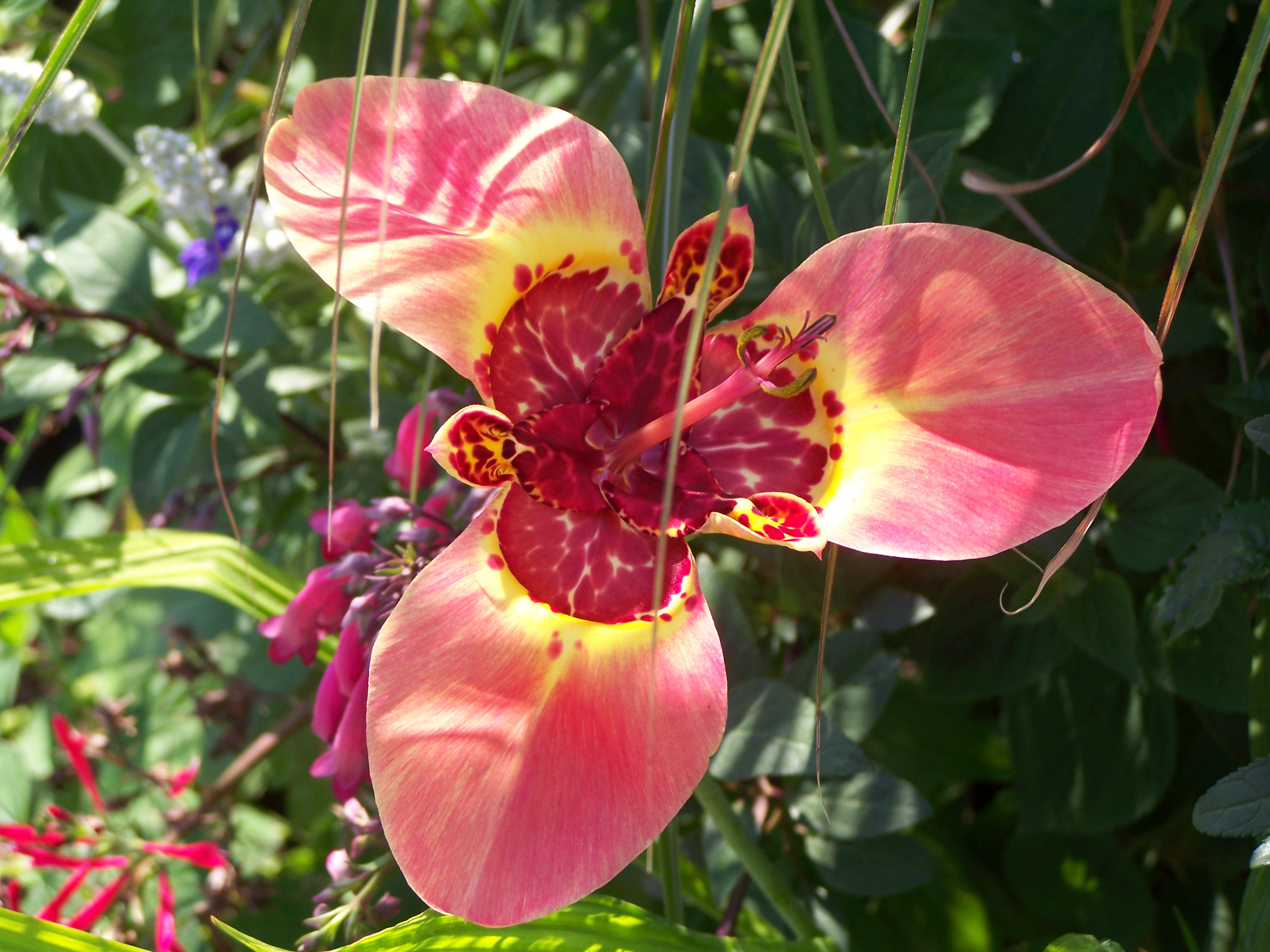
- Tigridia pavonia

Scientific classification
- Kingdom: Plantae
- Clade: Tracheophytes
- Clade: Angiosperms
- Clade: Monocots
- Order: Asparagales
- Family: Iridaceae
- Subfamily: Iridoideae
- Tribe: Tigridieae; Kitt.

Genera
- See text

= Tigridieae =

Tribe of flowering plants

Tigridieae is a tribe of plants in the subfamily Iridoideae and included in the family Iridaceae. It contains many perennials which have cormous rootstocks. The name of the tribe comes from its main genus - Tigridia. The tribe is native to the New World.

The flowers do not always have well differentiated petals like in many other Iridoideae. A considerable proportion of the tribe's members have identical petals as in Nemastylis or Calydorea.

List of genera:

- Alophia
- Calydorea
- Cardenanthus
- Cipura
- Cobana
- Cypella
- Eleutherine
- Ennealophus
- Gelasine
- Herbertia
- Hesperoxiphion
- Larentia
- Mastigostyla
- Nemastylis
- Tigridia
