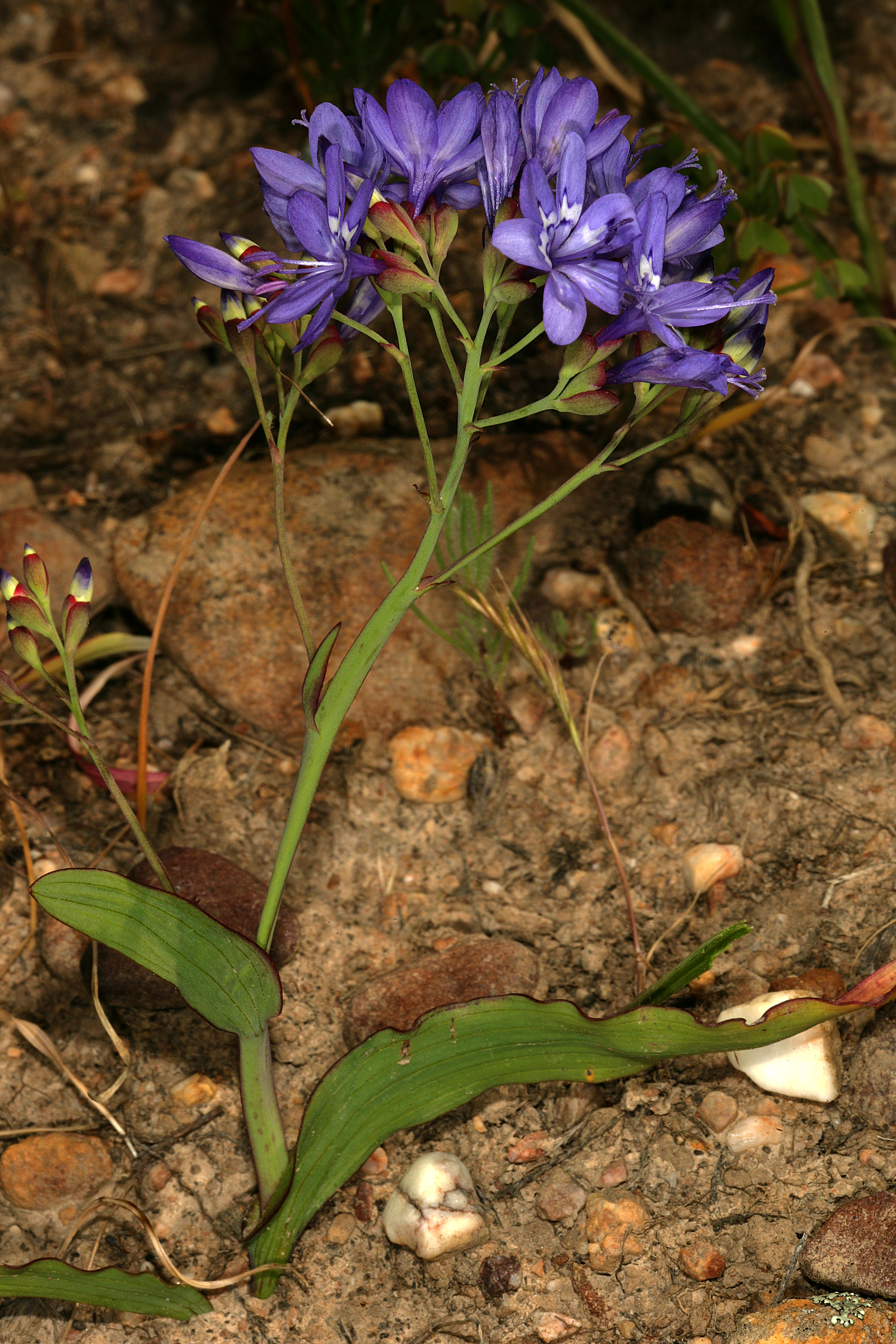
- Codonorhiza elandsmontana

Scientific classification
- Kingdom: Plantae
- Clade: Tracheophytes
- Clade: Angiosperms
- Clade: Monocots
- Order: Asparagales
- Family: Iridaceae
- Genus: Codonorhiza; Goldblatt & J.C.Manning

= Codonorhiza =

Genus of flowering plants

Codonorhiza is a genus of flowering plants belonging to the family Iridaceae. It is endemic to the southwestern Cape Provinces of South Africa.

Species:

- Codonorhiza azurea (Eckl. ex Baker) Goldblatt & J.C.Manning
- Codonorhiza corymbosa (L.) Goldblatt & J.C.Manning
- Codonorhiza elandsmontana Goldblatt & J.C.Manning
- Codonorhiza falcata (L.f.) Goldblatt & J.C.Manning
- Codonorhiza fastigiata (Lam.) Goldblatt & J.C.Manning
- Codonorhiza micrantha (E.Mey. ex Klatt) Goldblatt & J.C.Manning
- Codonorhiza pillansii Goldblatt & J.C.Manning
