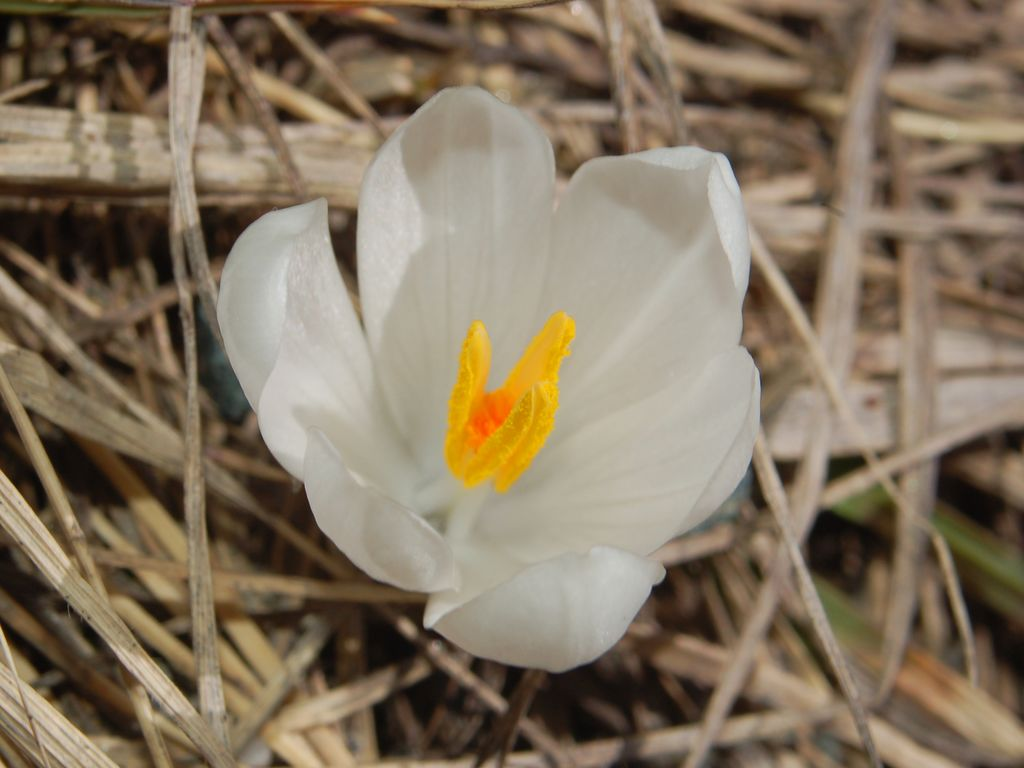
- Crocus vernus

Scientific classification
- Kingdom: Plantae
- Clade: Embryophytes
- Clade: Tracheophytes
- Clade: Spermatophytes
- Clade: Angiosperms
- Clade: Monocots
- Order: Asparagales
- Family: Iridaceae; Juss.

Subfamilies and tribes
- Subfamily Aristeoideae; Subfamily Crocoideae; Tribe Tritoniopsideae; Tribe Watsonieae; Tribe Gladioleae; Tribe Freesieae; Tribe Ixieae; Subfamily Geosiridoideae; Subfamily Iridoideae; Tribe Diplarreneae; Tribe Irideae; Tribe Sisyrinchieae; Tribe Tigridieae; Tribe Trimezieae; Subfamily Isophysidoideae; Subfamily Nivenioideae; Subfamily Patersonioideae

= Iridaceae =

Iridaceae Temporal range: 60–0 Ma Middle Paleocene - Recent

Family of flowering plants comprising irises, gladioli, and crocuses

Iridaceae (/ɪrɪˈdeɪsiˌaɪ, -siːˌiː/) is a family of plants in order Asparagales, taking its name from the irises. It has a nearly global distribution, with 69 accepted genera with a total of about 2500 species. It includes a number of economically important cultivated plants, such as species of Freesia, Gladiolus, and Crocus, as well as the crop saffron.

Members of this family are perennial plants, with a bulb, corm or rhizome. The plants grow erect, and have leaves that are generally grass-like, with a sharp central fold. Some examples of members of this family are the blue flag and yellow flag.

== Etymology ==
The family name comes from the genus Iris, the family's largest and best-known genus in Europe. This genus dates from 1753, when it was coined by Swedish botanist, Carl Linnaeus. Its name derives from the Greek goddess, Iris, who carried messages from Olympus to earth along a rainbow, whose colors were seen by Linnaeus in the multi-hued petals of many of the species.

== Taxonomy ==
Iridaceae is currently recognized as nested in the Asparagales order but was traditionally grouped with Liliales. Iridaceae was previously divided into four subfamilies but results from phylogenetic analysis suggested an additional three could be recognized. These differences in circumscription are a result of homoplastic traits, including asymmetric corms, woody corm covering, exclusion of the vascular trace during ovule development, and leaf margin. Molecular clock analyses have supported initial cladogenesis in Antarctica-Australasia 82 million years ago (mya) from a Doryanthaceae ancestor. The distribution of subfamilies in Iridaceae is considered to be phylogenetically structured, with all neotropical species belonging to one subfamily, the Irdoideae.

=== Crocoideae ===
Subfamily Crocoideae is one of the major subfamilies in the family Iridaceae. It contains many genera, including Afrocrocus, Babiana, Chasmanthe, Crocosmia, Crocus, Cyanixia, Devia, Dierama, Duthiastrum, Freesia, Geissorhiza, Gladiolus, Hesperantha, Ixia, Lapeirousia, Melasphaerula, Micranthus, Pillansia, Romulea, Sparaxis, Savannosiphon, Syringodea, Thereianthus, Tritonia, Tritoniopsis, Xenoscapa and Watsonia. They are mainly from Africa, but includes members from Europe and Asia. The rootstock is usually a corm, they have blooms which sometimes have scent, are collected in inflorescence and contain six tepals. The nectar is produced mostly in the base of the bloom from the glands of the ovary, which is where the flower forms a tube-like end. In some species there is no such end and the plant only provides pollen to pollinating insects. Members of this subfamily have the sword-shaped leaves typical of Iridaceae.

=== Isophysidoideae ===
Subfamily Isophysidoideae is monotypic, only containing Isophysis from Tasmania. It is the only member of the family with a superior ovary, and it grows a solitary star-like, yellow to brownish flower. It is also sister to all other extant taxa of Iridaceae, diverging 66mya.

=== Nivenioideae and allies ===
Subfamily Nivenioideae contained six genera from South Africa, Australia and Madagascar, including the core genera and only true shrubs in the family (Klattia, Nivenia and Witsenia). Upon phylogenetic analysis, subfamily Crocoideae is always found nested within Nivenioideae, leading to it not being a monophyletic taxon. A revised description of these groups led to the description of Aristea, Geosiris, and Patersonia each as separate subfamilies, retaining a core, monophyletic Nivenioideae. It is now distinguished as being evergreen shrubs with monocot-type secondary thickening, shield shaped seeds, and paired rhipidia with only one to two flowers in each cluster.

=== Iridoideae ===
Subfamily Iridoideae has the widest geographic distribution and is divided into four tribes and one sister genus: Irideae, Sisyrichieae, Trimezieae, Tigridieae, and Diplarreneae. Iridoideae is differentiated from the other subfamilies by having very short-lived flowers, nectaries on the perianth, and long branching styles. Excluding the Irideae, the evolution of oil-producing trichomes, called elaiophores, have been gained and lost in each of the tribes attracting oil bees. The genus Diplarreneae is sister to the rest of the subfamily and is unique to Iridoideae in having zygomorphic flowers and stamens with unequal height. Irideae represents the Old World portion of the subfamily but include several genera that diversified in North America, such as Iris. They are distinguishable with the presence of flattened anthers pressed to the style, petaloid crests, and schlerenchyma tissue along the margins of leaves. Sisyrichieae is noted for having long style branches that may interlace with stamens, partially fused filaments, and the lack of oxaloacetate crystals in leaves. Trimezieae is the smallest tribe with two to four genera, noted for the presence of large rhizomes or corms rather than bulbs as well as a thickened midrib. Several species with ornamented or iris-like flowers also possess a specialized method of forcing pollen onto heavy pollinators with hinged petals. Tigridieae are distinguished for their large bulbous rootstock and plicate, deciduous leaves. The number of genera and whether any morphology can distinguish between them has been debated.

- Iridaceae
  - - - - - - Iridoideae
              - - - - Tigridieae
                    - Trimezieae
                  - Sisyrinchieae
                - Irideae
              - Diplarreneae
            - Crocoideae
              - - - - Ixieae
                    - Freesieae
                  - Gladioleae
                - Watsonieae
              - Tritoniopsideae
          - Nivenioideae
        - Aristeoideae
      - Geosiridoideae
    - Patersonioideae
  - Isophysidoideae

== Ecology ==
Members of Iridaceae occur in a great variety of habitats. Gladiolus gueinzii occurs on the seashore just above the high tide mark within reach of the spray. Most species are adapted to seasonal climates that have a pronounced dry or cold period unfavorable for plant growth and during which the plants are dormant. As a result, most species are deciduous. Evergreen species are restricted to subtropical forests or savanna, temperate grasslands and perennially moist fynbos. A few species grow in marshes or along streams and some even grow only in the spray of seasonal waterfalls.

Members of the subfamilies Crocoideae and Nivenioideae first began cladogenesis in arid conditions in Africa, accelerating for Crocoideae as the Mediterranean climate emerged in Southern Africa. A similar process occurred for the tribe Tigridieae in Iridoideae following long-distance dispersal from South to North America, resulting in high levels of endemism. In the tribe Sisyrichieae, the continued formation of the Andes supported the movement to lower elevations along the Atlantic.

The aerial portions of deciduous species die back when the bulb or corm enters dormancy. The plants thus survive periods that are unfavorable for growth by retreating underground. This is particularly useful in grasslands and fynbos, which are adapted to regular burning in the dry season. At this time the plants are dormant and their bulbs or corms are able to survive the heat of the fires underground. Veld fires clear the soil surface of competing vegetation, as well as fertilize it with ash. With the arrival of the first rains, the dormant corms are ready to burst into growth, sending up flowers and stems before they can be shaded out by other vegetation. Many grassland and fynbos irids flower best after fires and some fynbos species will only flower in the season after a fire.

The majority of Iridaceae are pollinated by Hymenoptera, frequently by single species or a small group of species. These tight relationships found in individual species of Iridaceae, especially in Gladiolus, were the inspiration for the description of pollinator syndromes. Pollinators include various species of solitary bees, as well as sunbirds, long-proboscid flies (such as Moegistorhynchus longirostris), butterflies, and night moths. Ancestrally, flowers were zygomorphic, as in Crocoideae, with contrasting nectary locations for pollinators. Flowers may present nectar and pollen rewards to visitors, but some genera may only offer nectar such as in Gladious and Watsonia. Species of Ferraria produce putrid smells, floral cups, and dark mottled perianth in order to attract Diptera. Members of Iridoideae and Nivenioideae have radially symmetric trumpet-like flowers that secrete large amounts of nectar. This novel morphology enabled additional floral complexity and rapid evolution of pollinator relationships, as frequently as a new relationship over 5 speciations. New World Iridoideae represent one of the largest clades offering oil to pollinators, ranging from forced pollination using hinged petals to frequent failure to pollinate. Most of the variability in flowers occurs between subfamilies, including inflorescence structure, i.e. rhipidia, panicle, or spike, and floral longevity, i.e. less than one day to five days. Some members of the tribe Irideae have flowers functioning as meranthia, or developing as three separate zygomorphic units that pollinators visit individually.

== List of genera ==
69 genera have been recognized in the family, with a total of 2597 species described. The Afrotropical realm, and in particular South Africa, have the greatest diversity of genera.

- Afrocrocus J.C.Manning & Goldblatt
- Afrosolen Goldblatt & J.C.Manning
- Alophia Herb.
- Aristea Aiton
- Babiana Ker Gawl. – baboon flower
- Bobartia L.
- Calydorea Herb. – violet-lily
- Chasmanthe N.E.Br. – African cornflag
- Cipura Aubl.
- Cobana Ravenna
- Codonorhiza Goldblatt & J.C.Manning
- Crocosmia Planch. – Montbretia
- Crocus L.
- Cyanixia Goldblatt & J.C.Manning
- Cypella Herb.
- Devia Goldblatt & J.C.Manning
- Dierama K.Koch – Fairy-wand
- Dietes Salisb. ex Klatt – Fortnight lily, African iris
- Diplarrena Labill.
- Duthiastrum M.P.de Vos
- Eleutherine Herb.
- Ennealophus N.E.Br.
- Ferraria Burm. ex Mill.
- Freesia Eckl. ex Klatt (syn. Anomatheca)
- Geissorhiza Ker Gawl.
- Gelasine Herb.
- Geosiris Baill.
- Gladiolus Tourn. ex L.
- Herbertia Sweet
- Hesperantha Ker Gawl.
- Hesperoxiphion Baker
- Iris Tourn. ex L.
- Isophysis T.Moore
- Ixia L. – African cornlily
- Klattia Baker
- Lapeirousia Pourr.
- Larentia Klatt
- Lethia Ravenna
- Libertia Spreng.
- Mastigostyla I.M.Johnst.
- Melasphaerula Ker Gawl.
- Micranthus (Pers.) Eckl.
- Moraea Mill.
- Nemastylis Nutt.
- Nivenia Vent.
- Olsynium Raf. – grasswidow
- Orthrosanthus Sweet
- Patersonia R.Br.
- Phalocallis Herb.
- Pillansia L.Bolus
- Radinosiphon N.E.Br.
- Romulea Maratti
- Salpingostylis Small
- Savannosiphon Goldblatt & Marais
- Schizorhiza Goldblatt & J.C.Manning
- Sisyrinchium L. – blue-eyed grass, yellow-eyed grass
- Solenomelus Miers
- Sparaxis Ker Gawl. – wandflower, harlequin flower
- Syringodea Hook.f.
- Tapeinia Comm. ex Juss.
- Thereianthus G.J.Lewis
- Tigridia Juss. – tiger flower, Mexican shell flower
- Trimezia Salisb. ex Herb.
- Tritonia Ker Gawl.
- Tritoniopsis L.Bolus
- Watsonia Mill. – bugle-lily
- Witsenia Thunb.
- Xenoscapa (Goldblatt) Goldblatt & J.C.Manning
- Zygotritonia Mildbr.
