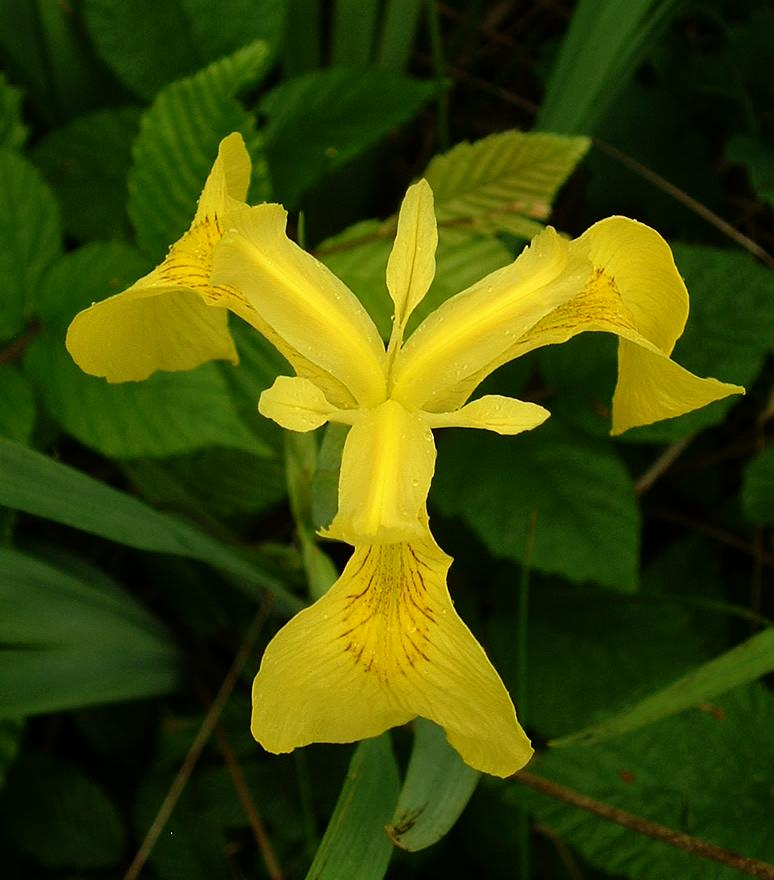
- Iris pseudacorus

Scientific classification
- Kingdom: Plantae
- Clade: Tracheophytes
- Clade: Angiosperms
- Clade: Monocots
- Order: Asparagales
- Family: Iridaceae
- Subfamily: Iridoideae; Eaton

Tribes
- Diplarreneae; Irideae; Sisyrinchieae; Tigridieae; Trimezieae

= Iridoideae =

Subfamily of flowering plants

Iridoideae is one of the two main subfamilies in the popular family Iridaceae. It contains the best-known genus - Iris. The members of this subfamily are widely distributed worldwide. They grow in all continents except Antarctica.

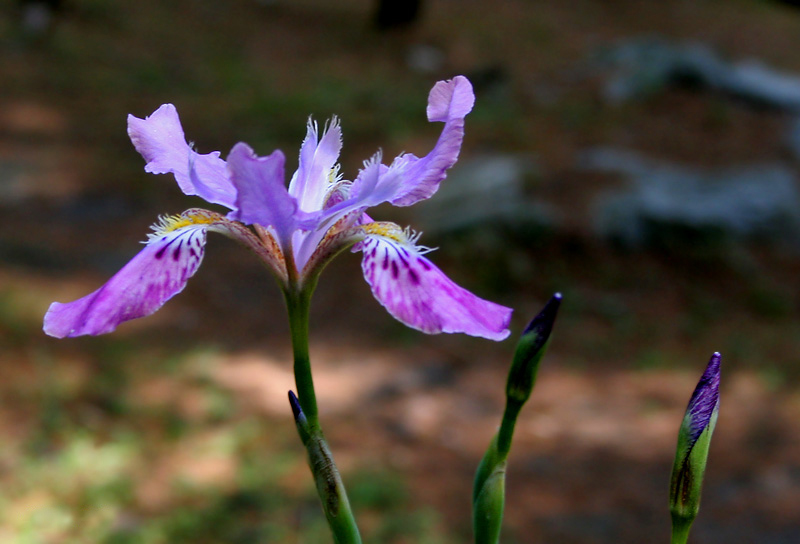
Iris milesii

They produce typical sword-shaped leaves and have mainly corms or rhizomes. There are some exceptions which have bulbs. These are two subgenera of Iris - Xiphium and Hermodactyloides.

The blooms, which are often scented, are arranged in often terminal inflorescences. Each flower has six petals. In most cases three of them are separated from the others and are specialized in different functions. However some are not, as in Nemastylis. Nectar is produced in their base. In some of the species the stamens are partially fused with the petals.

The 3-locular seed capsule contains the seeds which are often circular, flat in some cases drop-like grains coloured black or sometimes orange (Iris pseudacorus).

The species in the subfamily are often used as ornamental plants such as Iris and Tigridia. There are also species members which are at risk in their natural environment such as some subspecies of Ferraria crispa and Moraea villosa.

- Iridoideae
  - - - - Tigridieae
        - Trimezieae
      - Sisyrinchieae
    - Irideae
  - Diplarreneae
