= Ixia aurea =

Scientific classification
- Kingdom: Plantae
- Clade: Tracheophytes
- Clade: Angiosperms
- Clade: Monocots
- Order: Asparagales
- Family: Iridaceae
- Genus: Ixia
- Species: I. aurea

Binomial name
- Ixia aurea Goldblatt & J.C.Manning

Species of flowering plant

Ixia aurea is a perennial flowering plant and geophyte belonging to the genus Ixia and is part of the fynbos. The species is endemic to the Western Cape and occurs from Piketberg to Citrusdal and Darling. Although the plant has a range of 2 426 km², only three fragmented subpopulations remain. Crop cultivation is the single largest cause of habitat loss.

There is a possibility that the species has been overlooked because it closely resembles the Ixia maculata and Ixia dubia species.
