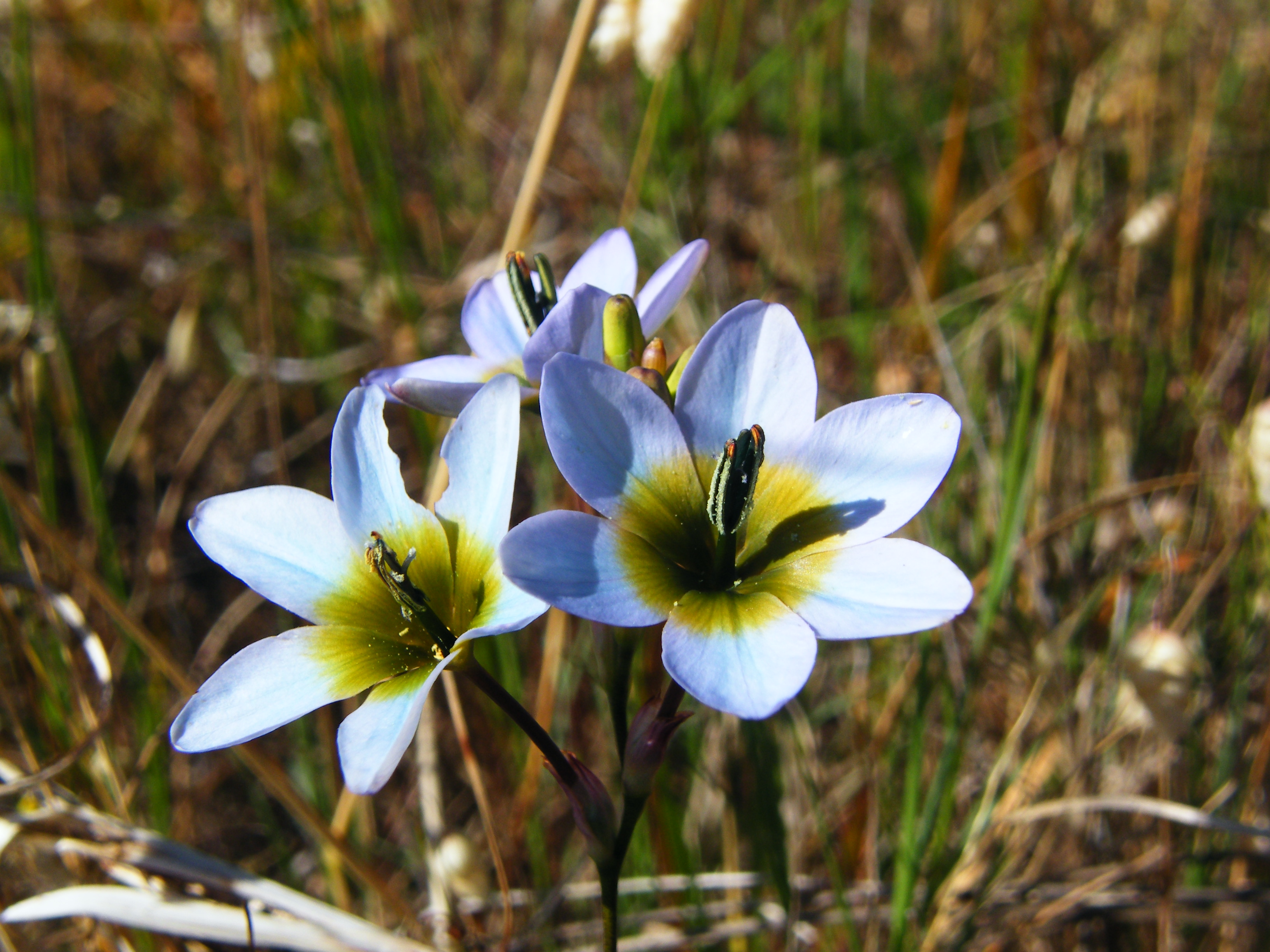

Scientific classification
- Kingdom: Plantae
- Clade: Tracheophytes
- Clade: Angiosperms
- Clade: Monocots
- Order: Asparagales
- Family: Iridaceae
- Genus: Ixia
- Species: I. monadelpha

Binomial name
- Ixia monadelpha Delaroche

Synonyms
- List: Eurydice columnaris (Salisb.) Nois.; Eurydice columnaris var. angustifolia (Andrews) Nois.; Eurydice columnaris var. latifolia (Andrews) Nois.; Eurydice columnaris var. versicolor (Andrews) Nois.; Eurydice grandiflora (Andrews) Nois.; Galaxia ixiiflora DC.; Galaxia ixiiflora Redouté; Galaxia ramosa DC.; Galaxia ramosa Redouté; Ixia angustifolia (Andrews) Klatt; Ixia cartilaginea Lam.; Ixia columellaris Ker Gawl.; Ixia columellaris KerGawl.; Ixia columellaris var. rhodolarynx Baker; Ixia columnaris Salisb.; Ixia columnaris var. angustifolia Andrews; Ixia columnaris var. grandiflora Andrews; Ixia columnaris var. latifolia Andrews; Ixia columnaris var. purpurea Andrews; Ixia columnaris var. versicolor Andrews; Ixia galaxioides Klatt; Ixia grandiflora (Andrews) Pers.; Ixia monadelphia Burm.f.; Ixia purpurea (Andrews) Klatt; Ixia variegata Banks; Ixia variegata Banks ex Schult.; Morphixia angustifolia (Andrews) Klatt; Morphixia columellaris (Ker Gawl.) Klatt; Morphixia grandiflora (Andrews) Klatt; Morphixia latifolia (Andrews) Klatt; Morphixia monadelpha (D.Delaroche) Klatt; Morphixia purpurea (Andrews) Klatt; Morphixia versicolor (Andrews) Klatt

= Ixia monadelpha =

South African geophyte

Ixia monadelpha, also known as the pied kalossie or bontkalossie, is an endangered species of geophyte found in wet sandy flats in the southwestern Cape of South Africa.

== Description ==
=== Growth form ===
This cormous geophyte grows 15–40 cm (5.9–15.7 in) tall. It has a simple stem with one or two short, spreading branches. They emerge at right angles to the stem and curve upwards.

=== Corm ===
The corm is more or less spherical and has a diameter of 12–20 mm (0.47–0.79 in). They are covered in soft, papery layers.

=== Leaves ===
The leaves are sword-shaped and are often loosely twisted. There are between four and seven leaves per plant, each of which is about half as long as the stem and 3–12 mm (0.12–0.47 in) wide. The margins are slightly thickened and become transparent when dry.

=== Flowers ===
Unscented flowers are present in September and October. Each plant produces between four and twelve salver-shaped flowers that grow close to each other in a flexuose spike inflorescence. Flowers are typically grey-blue to turquoise to purple or pink in colour. Although rare, some plants produce white or grey-yellow flowers. The center is darker, ranging from dark green to brown, red, purple and almost black in colour. The darker center has a light brown or green edge.

The flowers have dark stamens with blue or grey pollen. The filaments are joined for at least half o their length and the purple anthers are erect. The style divides between the base and the middle of the anthers, forming branches that are 2–3 mm (0.079–0.118 in) long.

The pale, dry floral bracts are speckled with brown or red and have distinctive thickened and twisted dark brown cusps. The outer bract with the central cusp in the most prominent.

== Taxonomy ==
Ixia monadelpha is the first species that was put into the eurydice subgenus. Initially proposed as being its own genus, species in this subgenus have fused stamen filaments. This feature is not seen in the rest of the genus. The species epithet monadelpha means one-brothered and refers to the joined filaments.

== Distribution and habitat ==
This species is endemic to a narrow region along the Atlantic Coast in the Western Cape of South Africa. It is currently found growing between Darling in the West Coast region and Hout Bay on the Cape Peninsula, although it was historically found as far as Hopefield and Tulbagh. It is now restricted to between four and six fragmented subpopulations, most of which are around Darling. The largest population in found on Rondebosch Common in Cape Town. Plants are found growing on seasonally wet sandy flats and lower slopes.

== Ecology ==
I. monadelpha is insect pollinated. The dark center of the flower is typical of species that are pollinated by monkey beetles. It is known to be visited by Peritrichia cinerea. and Lepithrix fulvipes, two monkey beetle species.

This species is often found growing alongside Ixia curta, an orange Ixia species that also has fused filaments but differs in other morphological features.

== Conservation ==
This species is considered to be endangered by the South African National Biodiversity Institute. Only a few scattered subpopulations remain in isolated remnants. These populations are declining due to alien vegetation and habitat degradation.

== Gallery ==
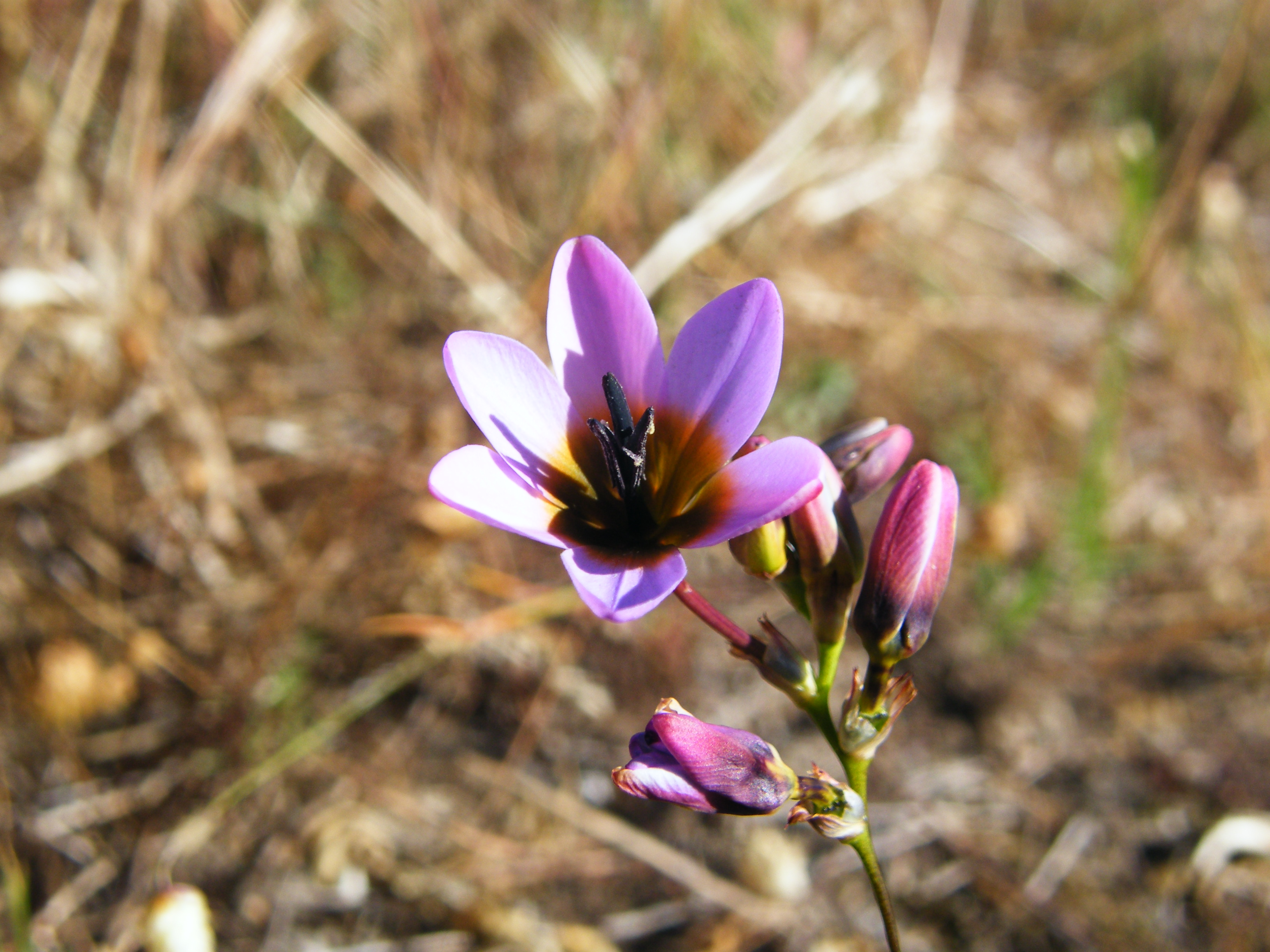
A pink form

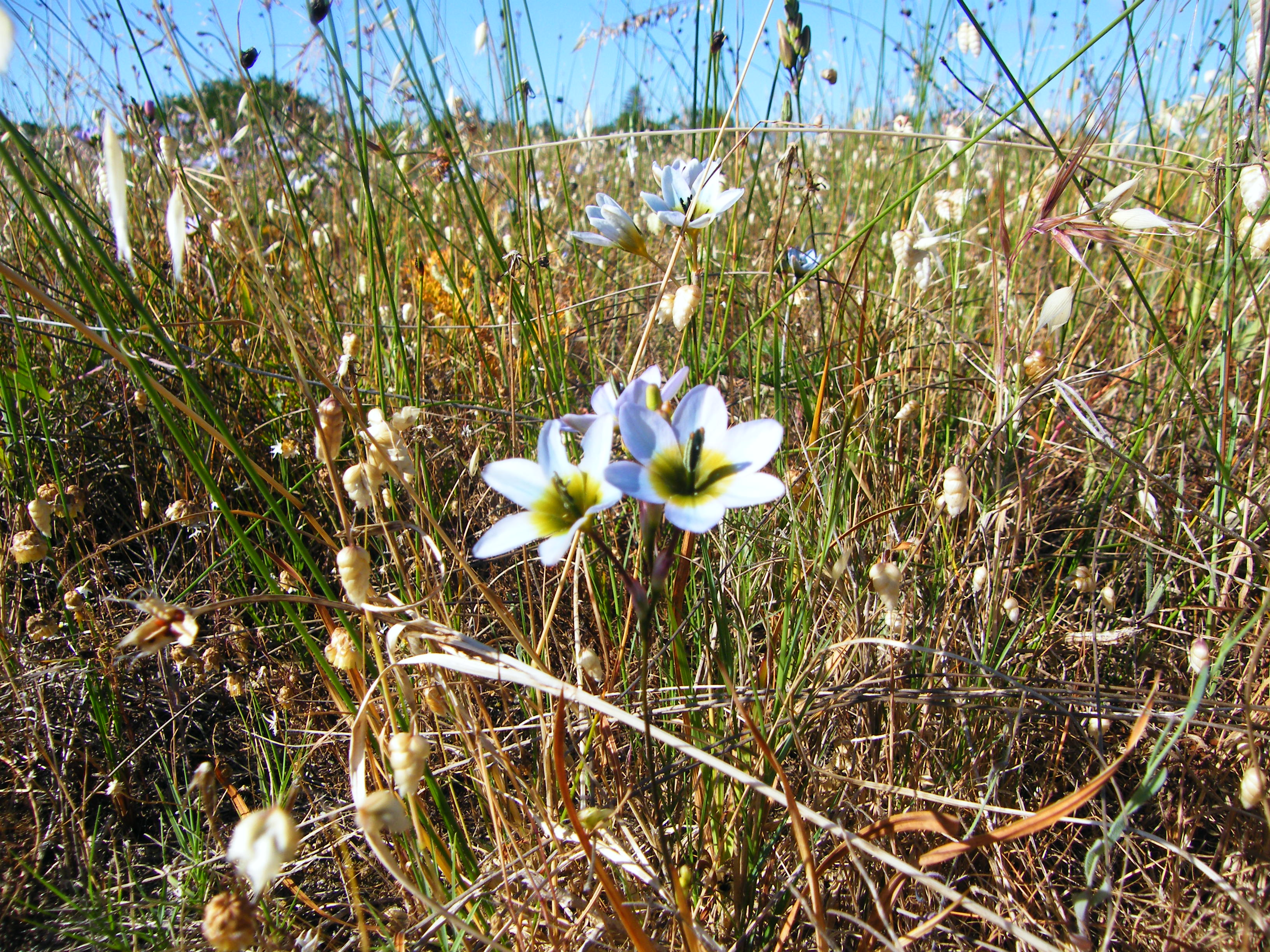
Ixia monadelpha in habitat
