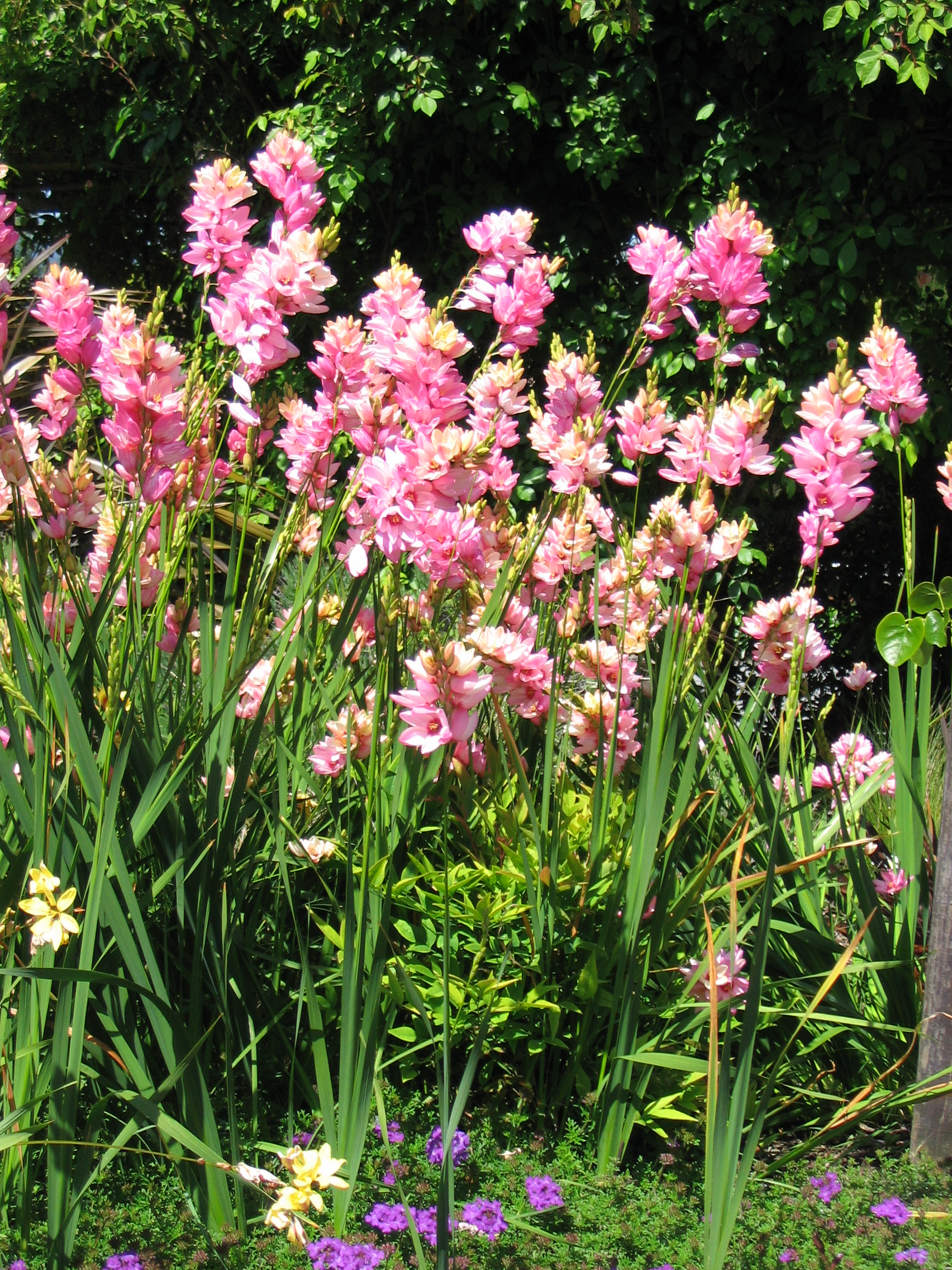

Scientific classification
- Kingdom: Plantae
- Clade: Embryophytes
- Clade: Tracheophytes
- Clade: Angiosperms
- Clade: Monocots
- Order: Asparagales
- Family: Iridaceae
- Subfamily: Crocoideae
- Tribe: Croceae
- Genus: Ixia; L. (1762), nom. cons.

Type species
- Ixia polystachya L.

Species
- See text

Synonyms
- Agretta Eckl. (1827), nom. nud.; Dichone P.Lawson ex Salisb. (1812); Eurydice (Pers.) Nois. (1826); Houttuynia Houtt. (1780), nom. rej.; Hyalis Salisb. (1812), nom. nud.; Morphixia Ker Gawl. (1827); Wuerthia Regel (1851)

= Ixia =

Genus of flowering plants

Ixia is a genus of cormous plants native to South Africa from the family Iridaceae. Some of them are known as the corn lily. Some distinctive traits include sword-like leaves and long wiry stems with star-shaped flowers. It usually prefers well-drained soil. The popular corn lily has specific, not very intense fragrance. It is often visited by many insects such as bees. The Ixia are also used sometimes as ornamental plants. The genus is endemic to the Cape Provinces of western South Africa.

The genus name is derived from the Ancient Greek ἰξία (ixia) ( = χαμαιλέων λευκός, (chamaeleon leukos)), the pine thistle, Carlina gummifera, an unrelated plant in the daisy family, Asteraceae.

== Species ==
The genus Ixia includes the following species:

- Ixia abbreviata Houtt.
- Ixia acaulis Goldblatt & J.C.Manning
- Ixia alata Goldblatt & J.C.Manning
- Ixia alticola Goldblatt & J.C.Manning
- Ixia altissima Goldblatt & J.C.Manning
- Ixia angelae Goldblatt & J.C.Manning
- Ixia arenosa Goldblatt & J.C.Manning
- Ixia atrandra Goldblatt & J.C.Manning
- Ixia aurea J.C.Manning & Goldblatt
- Ixia bellendenii R.C.Foster
- Ixia bifolia J.C.Manning & Goldblatt
- Ixia brevituba G.J.Lewis
- Ixia brunneobractea G.J.Lewis
- Ixia calendulacea Goldblatt & J.C.Manning
- Ixia campanulata Houtt.
- Ixia capillaris L.f.
- Ixia cedarmontana Goldblatt & J.C.Manning
- Ixia cochlearis G.J.Lewis
- Ixia collina Goldblatt & Snijman
- Ixia confusa (G.J.Lewis) Goldblatt & J.C.Manning
- Ixia contorta Goldblatt & J.C.Manning
- Ixia curta Andrews
- Ixia curvata G.J.Lewis
- Ixia dieramoides Goldblatt & J.C.Manning
- Ixia divaricata Goldblatt & J.C.Manning
- Ixia dolichosiphon Goldblatt & J.C.Manning
- Ixia dubia Vent.
- Ixia ecklonii Goldblatt & J.C.Manning
- Ixia erubescens Goldblatt
- Ixia esterhuyseniae M.P.de Vos
- Ixia exiliflora Goldblatt & J.C.Manning
- Ixia flagellaris Goldblatt & J.C.Manning
- Ixia flexuosa L.
- Ixia frederickii M.P.de Vos
- Ixia fucata Ker Gawl.
  - Ixia fucata var. filifolia G.J.Lewis
  - Ixia fucata var. fucata
- Ixia gloriosa G.J.Lewis
- Ixia helmei Goldblatt & J.C.Manning
- Ixia lacerata Goldblatt & J.C.Manning
- Ixia latifolia D.Delaroche
  - Ixia latifolia var. angustifolia G.J.Lewis
  - Ixia latifolia var. latifolia
  - Ixia latifolia var. parviflora G.J.Lewis
  - Ixia latifolia var. ramulosa G.J.Lewis
- Ixia leipoldtii G.J.Lewis
- Ixia leucantha Jacq.
- Ixia linderi Goldblatt & J.C.Manning
- Ixia linearifolia Goldblatt & J.C.Manning
- Ixia longistylis (M.P.de Vos) Goldblatt & J.C.Manning
- Ixia longituba N.E.Br.
  - Ixia longituba var. bellendenii R.C.Foster
  - Ixia longituba var. longituba
- Ixia lutea Sessé & Moc.
- Ixia lutea var. ovata (Andr.) B.Nord
- Ixia macrocarpa Goldblatt & J.C.Manning
- Ixia maculata L.
  - Ixia maculata var. fusco-citrina (Desf.ex DC) G.J.Lewis
  - Ixia maculata var. intermedia G.J.Lewis
- Ixia marginifolia (Salisb) G.J.Lewis
- Ixia metelerkampiae L.Bolus
- Ixia micrandra Baker
  - Ixia micrandra var. confusa G.JLewis
  - Ixia micrandra var. micranda
  - Ixia micrandra var. minor G.J.Lewis
- Ixia minor (G.J.Lewis) Goldblatt & J.C.Manning
- Ixia mollis Goldblatt & J.C.Manning
- Ixia monadelpha D.Delaroche
- Ixia monticola Goldblatt & J.C.Manning
- Ixia mostertii M.P.de Vos
- Ixia nutans Goldblatt & J.C.Manning
- Ixia odorata Ker Gawl.
  - Ixia odorata var. odorata
- Ixia orientalis L.Bolus
- Ixia oxalidiflora Goldblatt & J.C.Manning
- Ixia paniculata D.Delaroche
- Ixia parva Goldblatt & J.C.Manning
- Ixia patens Aiton
  - Ixia patens var. patens
- Ixia pauciflora G.J.Lewis
- Ixia pavonia Goldblatt & J.C.Manning
- Ixia polystachya L.
  - Ixia polystachya var. lutea (Ker Gawl.) G.J.Lewis
  - Ixia polystachya var. longistylus var. nova
  - Ixia polystachya var. polystachya
- Ixia pumilio Goldblatt & Snijman
- Ixia purpureorosea G.J.Lewis
- Ixia ramulosa (G.J.Lewis) Goldblatt & J.C.Manning
- Ixia rapunculoides Redouté
  - Ixia rapunculoides var. flaccida G.J.Lewis
  - Ixia rapuncuolides var. namaquana (L.Bolus) G.J.Lewis
  - Ixia rapunculoides var. rapunculoides
  - Ixia rapunculoides var. rigida G.J.Lewis
  - Ixia rapunculoides var. robusta G.J.Lewis
  - Ixia rapunculoides var subpendula G.J..Lewis
- Ixia reclinata Goldblatt & J.C.Manning
- Ixia recondita Goldblatt & J.C.Manning
- Ixia rigida Goldblatt & J.C.Manning
- Ixia rivulicola Goldblatt & J.C.Manning
- Ixia robusta (G.J.Lewis) Goldblatt & J.C.Manning
- Ixia roseoalba Goldblatt & J.C.Manning
- Ixia rouxii G.J.Lewis
- Ixia sarmentosa Goldblatt & J.C.Manning
- Ixia saundersiana Goldblatt & J.C.Manning
- Ixia scillaris L.
  - Ixia scillaris var. subundulata G.J.Lewis
- Ixia seracina Goldblatt & J.C.Manning
- Ixia simulans Goldblatt & J.C.Manning
- Ixia sobolifera Goldblatt & J.C.Manning
- Ixia splendida G.J.Lewis
- Ixia stenophylla Goldblatt & J.C.Manning
- Ixia stohriae L.Bolus
- Ixia stolonifera G.J.Lewis
- Ixia stricta (Eckl. ex Klatt) G.J.Lewis
- Ixia superba J.C.Manning & Goldblatt
- Ixia tenuifolia Vahl
- Ixia tenuis Goldblatt & J.C.Manning
- Ixia teretifolia Goldblatt & J.C.Manning
- Ixia thomasiae Goldblatt
- Ixia trifolia G.J.Lewis
- Ixia trinervata (Baker) G.J.Lewis
- Ixia vanzijliae L.Bolus
- Ixia versicolor G.J.Lewis
- Ixia vinacea G.J.Lewis
- Ixia viridiflora Lam.

== See also ==
- List of plants known as lily

== Bibliography ==
- Goldblatt, P.; Manning, J. C. (14 August 2008). "Systematics of the southern African genus Ixia (Iridaceae). 1. The I. rapunculoides complex". Bothalia. 38 (1): 1–22. Bibcode:2008Botha..38...83B. doi:10.4102/abc.v38i1.257.
- Goldblatt, P.; Manning, J. C. (14 August 2008). "Systematics of the southern African genus Ixia (Iridaceae). 2. The filiform-leaved I. capillaris complex". Bothalia. 38 (2): 115–124. Bibcode:2008Botha..38..147B. doi:10.4102/abc.v38i2.276.
- Goldblatt, P.; Manning, J. C. (13 December 2011). "Systematics of the southern African genus Ixia (Iridaceae). 3. Sections Hyalis and Morphixia". Bothalia. 41 (1): 83–134. Bibcode:2011Botha..41...83G. doi:10.4102/abc.v41i1.35.
- Goldblatt, P.; Manning, J. C. (9 December 2012). "Systematics of the southern African genus Ixia (Iridaceae: Crocoideae): 4. Revision of sect. Dichone". Bothalia. 42 (2): 87–110. Bibcode:2012Botha..42...87G. doi:10.4102/abc.v42i2.11.
