= I. lutea =

I. lutea may refer to:

- Ibicella lutea, a plant native to South America
- Incarvillea lutea, a plant native to Asia
- Ixia lutea, a cormous plant
