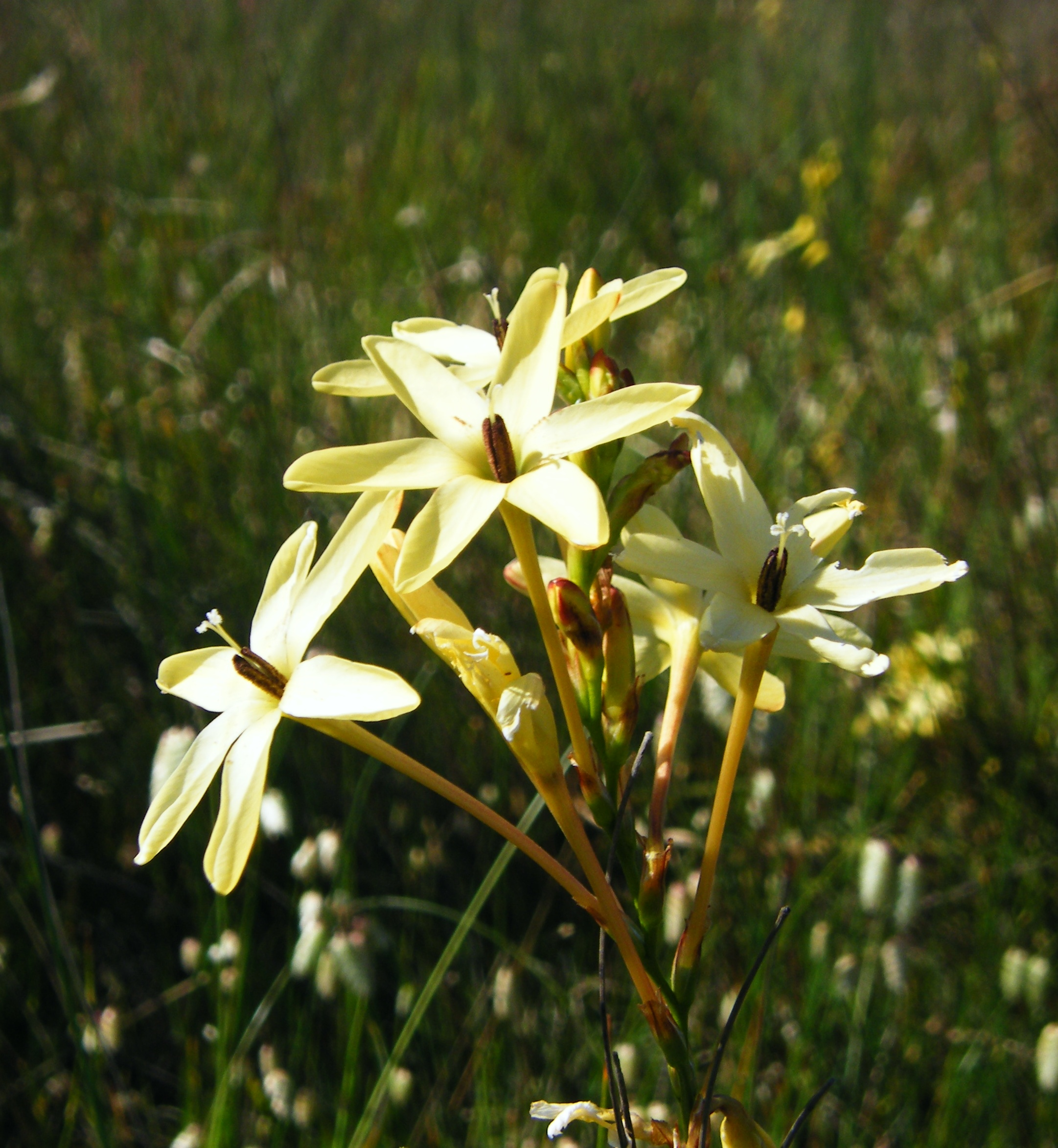

Scientific classification
- Kingdom: Plantae
- Clade: Tracheophytes
- Clade: Angiosperms
- Clade: Monocots
- Order: Asparagales
- Family: Iridaceae
- Genus: Ixia
- Species: I. paniculata

Binomial name
- Ixia paniculata D.Delaroche

= Ixia paniculata =

Species of flowering plant

Ixia paniculata is a plant species in the family Iridaceae.
