= Ixia atrandra =

Scientific classification
- Kingdom: Plantae
- Clade: Tracheophytes
- Clade: Angiosperms
- Clade: Monocots
- Order: Asparagales
- Family: Iridaceae
- Genus: Ixia
- Species: I. atrandra

Binomial name
- Ixia atrandra Goldblatt & J.C.Manning

Species of flowering plant

Ixia atrandra is a species of flowering plant in the family Iridaceae. It is a perennial geophyte and is part of the renosterveld. The species is endemic to the Western Cape and occurs from Villiersdorp to Worcester. The plant has a range of 70 km^{2} and there are only three subpopulations. Seventy percent of the plant's habitat has been altered due to crop cultivation while the current threat is overgrazing and lack of fires.
