= Ixia gloriosa =

Scientific classification
- Kingdom: Plantae
- Clade: Tracheophytes
- Clade: Angiosperms
- Clade: Monocots
- Order: Asparagales
- Family: Iridaceae
- Genus: Ixia
- Species: I. gloriosa

Binomial name
- Ixia gloriosa G.J.Lewis

Species of flowering plant

Ixia gloriosa is a perennial flowering plant and geophyte belonging to the genus Ixia and is part of the fynbos and renosterveld. The species is endemic to the Western Cape and occurs from Montagu to Barrydale. The plant has an area of occurrence of 11 km². The species' habitat is threatened by crop cultivation: vineyards and orchards.
