= Ixia marginifolia =

Scientific classification
- Kingdom: Plantae
- Clade: Tracheophytes
- Clade: Angiosperms
- Clade: Monocots
- Order: Asparagales
- Family: Iridaceae
- Genus: Ixia
- Species: I. marginifolia

Binomial name
- Ixia marginifolia G.J.Lewis

Synonyms
- Hyalis marginifolia Salisb.; Ixia capillaris var. lancea Ker Gawl.; Ixia capillaris var. stricta Ker Gawl.; Ixia lancea Jacq.; Morphixia capillaris var. lancea (Ker Gawl.) Baker; Morphixia lancea (Ker Gawl.) Klatt

Species of flowering plant

Ixia marginifolia is a perennial flowering plant and geophyte belonging to the genus Ixia and is part of the fynbos and Nama Karoo. The species is endemic to the Northern Cape and the Western Cape. The species occurs from Loeriesfontein to Fraserburg, Beaufort West and Matjiesfontein.
