= Ixia metelerkampiae =

Scientific classification
- Kingdom: Plantae
- Clade: Tracheophytes
- Clade: Angiosperms
- Clade: Monocots
- Order: Asparagales
- Family: Iridaceae
- Genus: Ixia
- Species: I. metelerkampiae

Binomial name
- Ixia metelerkampiae L.Bolus

Species of flowering plant

Ixia metelerkampiae is a perennial flowering plant and geophyte belonging to the genus Ixia and is part of the fynbos. The species is endemic to the Western Cape and occurs on the mountains between Wolseley, Paarl and Worcester. The plant has a range of 296 km². There are seven subpopulations that are threatened by invasive species. It has also ceded habitat in the Elandskloof Mountains to plantations and to vineyards in the Slanghoek Valley.

The plant is stimulated by fires.
