= Ixia tenuifolia =

Scientific classification
- Kingdom: Plantae
- Clade: Tracheophytes
- Clade: Angiosperms
- Clade: Monocots
- Order: Asparagales
- Family: Iridaceae
- Genus: Ixia
- Species: I. tenuifolia

Binomial name
- Ixia tenuifolia Vahl

Synonyms
- Freesea mineatolateritia Eckl.; Ixia framesii L.Bolus; Ixia pulcherrima Eckl.

Species of flowering plant

Ixia tenuifolia is a perennial flowering plant and geophyte belonging to the genus Ixia and is part of the fynbos. The species is endemic to the Western Cape and occurs from Malmesbury to Darling and Kalbaskraal. The plant has an area of occurrence of 18 km². The species has lost large parts of its habitat to crop cultivation and is currently threatened by invasive plants.
