= Ixia pumilio =

Scientific classification
- Kingdom: Plantae
- Clade: Tracheophytes
- Clade: Angiosperms
- Clade: Monocots
- Order: Asparagales
- Family: Iridaceae
- Genus: Ixia
- Species: I. pumilio

Binomial name
- Ixia pumilio Goldblatt & Snijman

Species of flowering plant

Ixia pumilio is a flowering plant and geophyte belonging to the genus Ixia and is part of the fynbos. The species is endemic to the Western Cape and occurs in the Breede River Valley, south of Worcester. The plant has a range of less than 10 km² and there is only one population, on either side of the river on the banks. The plant was first discovered in 1983 and confirmed again in 2012. It is estimated that the population consists of less than 200 plants. The habitat is threatened by crop cultivation and invasive plants.
