= Ixia rapunculoides =

Scientific classification
- Kingdom: Plantae
- Clade: Tracheophytes
- Clade: Angiosperms
- Clade: Monocots
- Order: Asparagales
- Family: Iridaceae
- Genus: Ixia
- Species: I. rapunculoides

Binomial name
- Ixia rapunculoides Redouté

Species of flowering plant

Ixia rapunculoides, the blue kalossie, is a perennial flowering plant and geophyte belonging to the genus Ixia and is part of the fynbos and the Succulent Karoo. The species is endemic to the Northern Cape and Western Cape and occurs in the western Karoo, from Loeriesfontein to Sutherland.
