= Ixia curvata =

Scientific classification
- Kingdom: Plantae
- Clade: Tracheophytes
- Clade: Angiosperms
- Clade: Monocots
- Order: Asparagales
- Family: Iridaceae
- Genus: Ixia
- Species: I. curvata

Binomial name
- Ixia curvata G.J.Lewis

Species of flowering plant

Ixia curvata is a perennial flowering plant and geophyte belonging to the genus Ixia and is part of the fynbos. The species is endemic to the Northern Cape and occurs from the Hantamberg, near Calvinia, to the Roggeveld Mountains, near Middelpos.
