= Ixia fucata =

Scientific classification
- Kingdom: Plantae
- Clade: Tracheophytes
- Clade: Angiosperms
- Clade: Monocots
- Order: Asparagales
- Family: Iridaceae
- Genus: Ixia
- Species: I. fucata

Binomial name
- Ixia fucata Ker Gawl.

Species of flowering plant

Ixia fucata is a perennial flowering plant and geophyte belonging to the genus Ixia and is part of the fynbos. The species is endemic to the Western Cape and occurs from the Hex River and the Keeromsberg to the western Langeberg.
