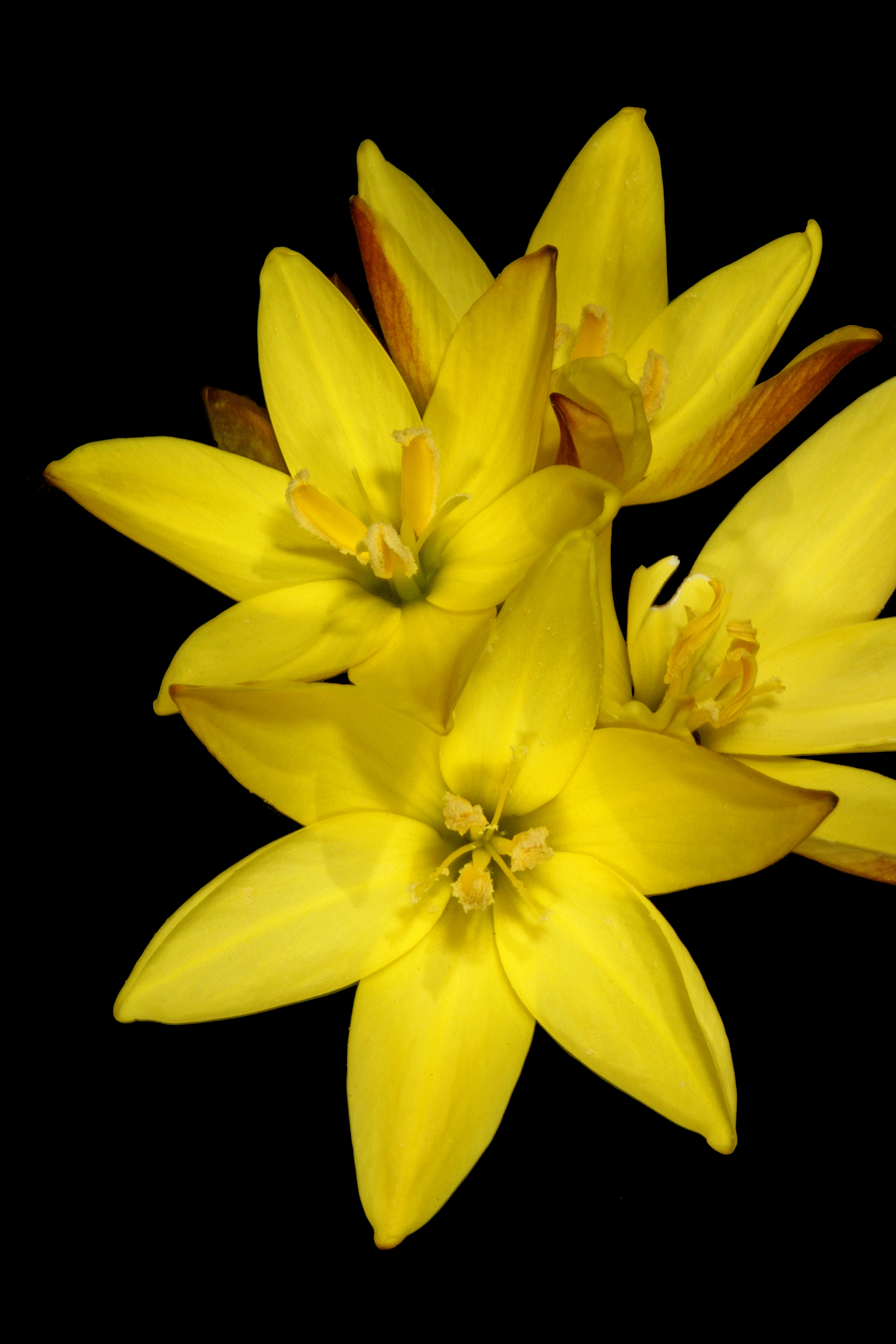

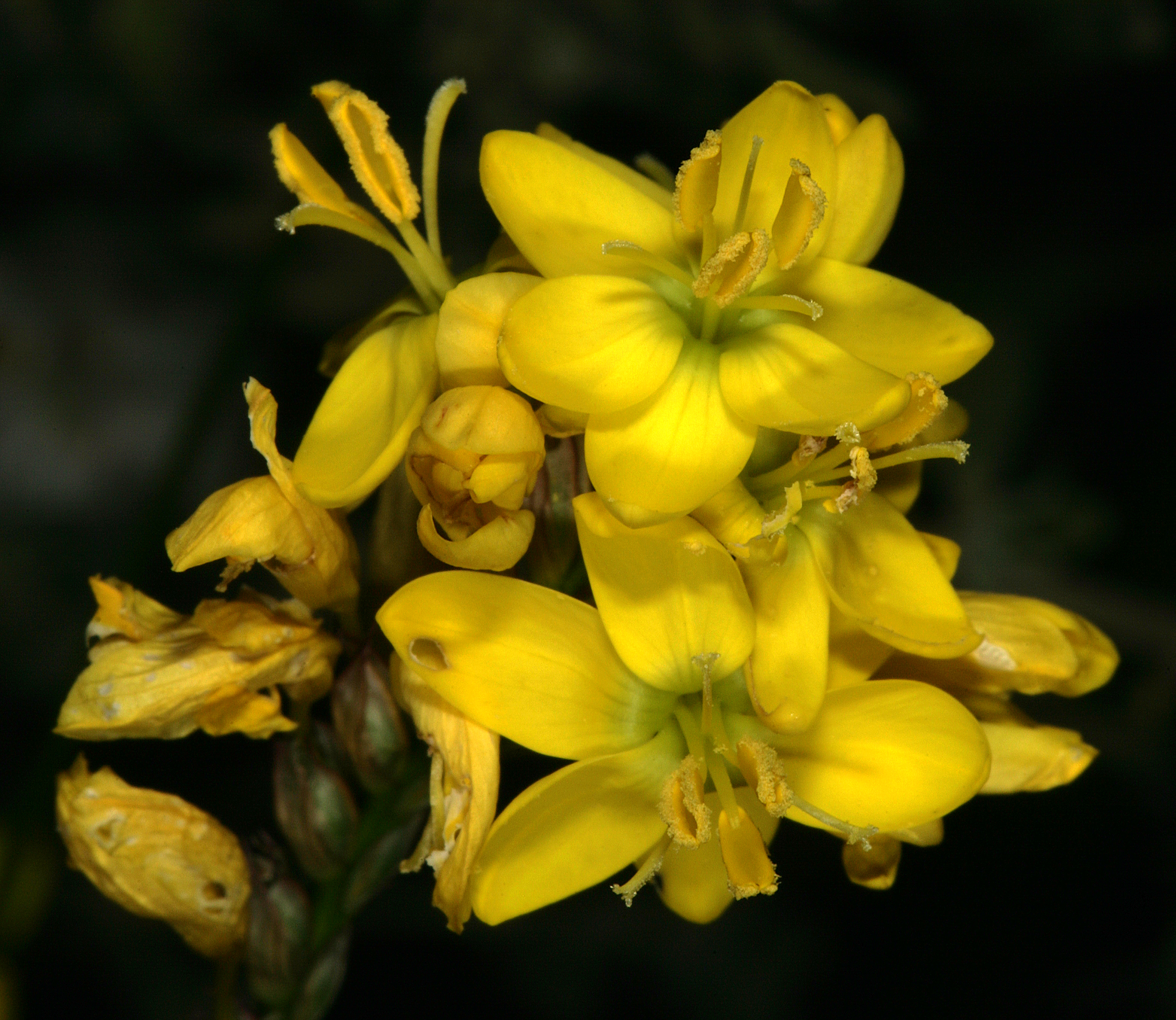

Scientific classification
- Kingdom: Plantae
- Clade: Embryophytes
- Clade: Tracheophytes
- Clade: Spermatophytes
- Clade: Angiosperms
- Clade: Monocots
- Order: Asparagales
- Family: Iridaceae
- Genus: Ixia
- Species: I. odorata

Binomial name
- Ixia odorata Ker Gawl.

Synonyms
- Agretta pallideflavens Eckl.; Ixia avellana R.C.Foster; Ixia erecta Thunb.; Ixia flavescens Eckl.; Ixia odorata var. hesperanthoides G.J.Lewis; Ixia polystachya var. flavescens (Eckl. ex Baker) Baker; Ixia polystachya var. flexuosa Lam.; Morphixia odorata (Ker Gawl.) Baker

= Ixia odorata =

Species of flowering plant

Ixia odorata is a perennial flowering plant and geophyte belonging to the genus Ixia and part of the fynbos. The species is endemic to the Western Cape of South Africa and occurs from the Olifants River Mountains and Piketberg to the Cape Peninsula, Kleinrivier Mountains and Elim.
