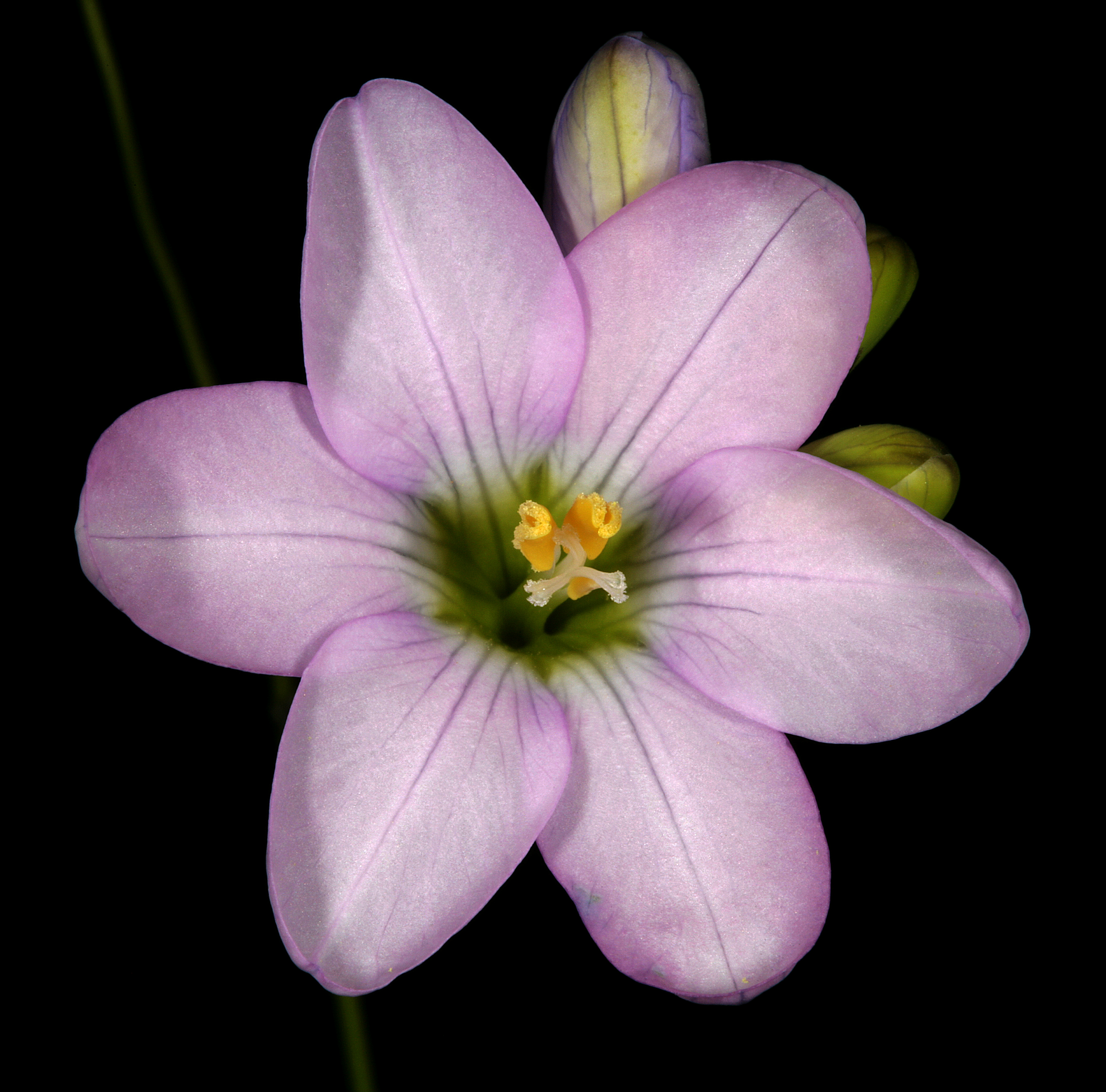

Scientific classification
- Kingdom: Plantae
- Clade: Tracheophytes
- Clade: Angiosperms
- Clade: Monocots
- Order: Asparagales
- Family: Iridaceae
- Genus: Ixia
- Species: I. latifolia

Binomial name
- Ixia latifolia D.Delaroche

Synonyms
- Geissorhiza latifolia (D.Delaroche) Baker; Hyalis aulica (Aiton) Salisb.; Hyalis latifolia (D.Delaroche) Salisb.; Ixia aulica Aiton; Ixia capillaris var. aulica (Aiton) Ker Gawl.; Ixia capillaris var. incarnata (Jacq.) Ker Gawl.; Ixia capitata var. stellata Andrews; Ixia incarnata Jacq.; Ixia latifolia var. curviramosa G.J.Lewis; Ixia ovata var. stellata (Andrews) Baker; Ixia phlogiflora Redouté; Ixia scariosa Thunb.; Ixia stellata (Andrews) Klatt; Morphixia aulica (Aiton) Ker Gawl.; Morphixia capillaris var. incarnata (Jacq.) Baker; Morphixia incarnata (Jacq.) Ker Gawl.; Tritonia latifolia (D.Delaroche) N.E.Br.

= Ixia latifolia =

Species of flowering plant

Ixia latifolia is a perennial flowering plant and geophyte belonging to the genus Ixia and is part of the fynbos. The species is endemic to the Western Cape and occurs in the Koue Bokkeveld along the ridge of the Tankwa Karoo to the Klein Swartberg and the southern slopes of the Gamkaberg.
