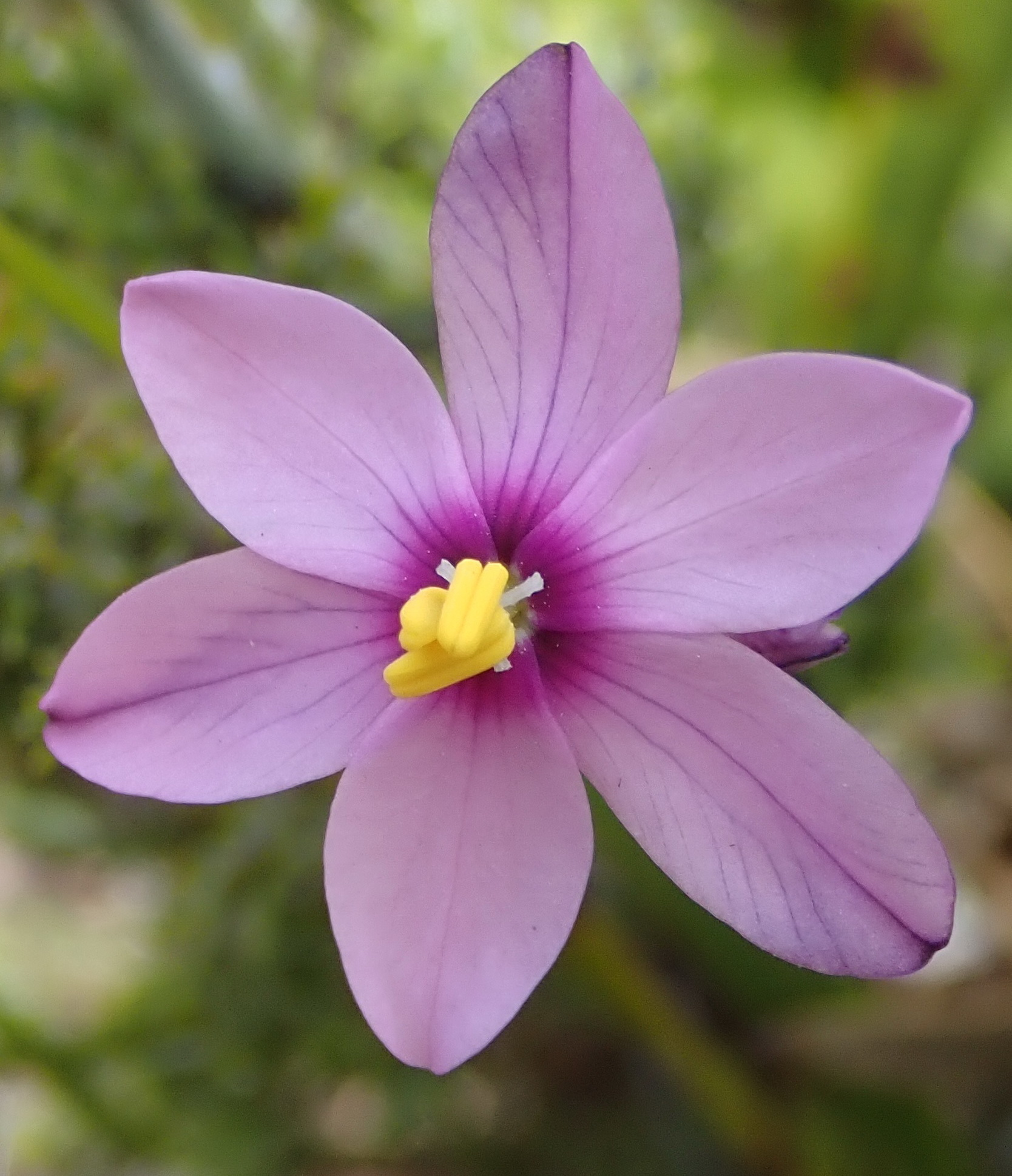

Scientific classification
- Kingdom: Plantae
- Clade: Tracheophytes
- Clade: Angiosperms
- Clade: Monocots
- Order: Asparagales
- Family: Iridaceae
- Genus: Ixia
- Species: I. confusa

Binomial name
- Ixia confusa (G.J.Lewis) Goldblatt & J.C.Manning

Synonyms
- Ixia micrandra var. confusa G.J.Lewis; Ixia polystachya Ker Gawl.; Watsonia retusa Klatt

= Ixia confusa =

Species of flowering plant

Ixia confusa is a perennial flowering plant and geophyte belonging to the genus Ixia, and is a component of the vygieveld biome. The species is endemic to the Western Cape and occurs in the Riviersonderend Mountains, Langeberg, Groot-Swartberg and Outeniqua Mountains and southwards across the Overberg to the southern Cape coast.
