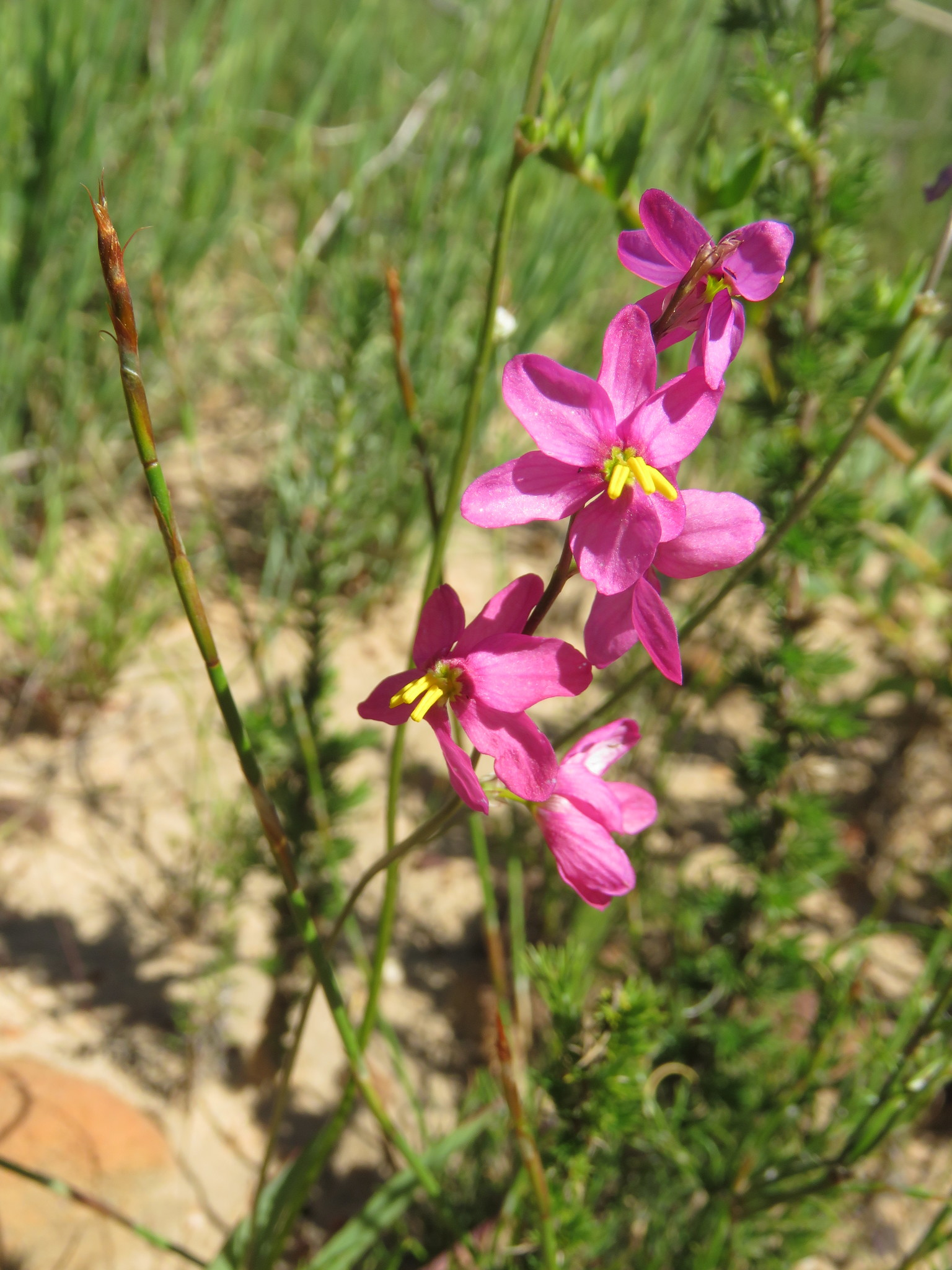

Conservation status
- Near Threatened (SANBI Red List)

Scientific classification
- Kingdom: Plantae
- Clade: Embryophytes
- Clade: Tracheophytes
- Clade: Angiosperms
- Clade: Monocots
- Order: Asparagales
- Family: Iridaceae
- Genus: Ixia
- Species: I. scillaris

Binomial name
- Ixia scillaris L.

Synonyms
- Tritonia scillaris (L.) Baker; Tritonixia scillaris (L.) Klatt

= Ixia scillaris =

Agretjie Kalossie

Species of flowering plant endemic to the Fybos

Ixia scillaris, the agretjie kalossie, is a perennial cormous flowering plant in the genus Ixia. It is endemic to a small portion of the Fynbos in the Western Cape.

== Distribution ==
Its range is from Tulbagh and Darling to the Cape Peninsula and Somerset West.

== Subspecies ==
There are 3 infraspecific names; 2 subspecies and 1 variety of the species scillaris:

- Ixia scillaris subsp. scillaris
- Ixia scillaris subsp. toximontana Goldblatt & J.C.Manning
- Ixia scillaris var. latifolia Ker Gawl.

== Conservation status ==
- Ixia scillaris subsp. scillaris has an EOO of 5,525 km^{2} (2,133 sq mi). There are between 15 and 20 locations remaining, which continue to decline due to ongoing habitat loss and degradation, along with competition from alien invasive plants; as such, it is classified as Near Threatened.
- Ixia scillaris subsp. toximontana is described as Rare due to it being range-restricted with an EOO of 260 km^{2} (100 sq mi).
- Ixia scillaris var. latifolia is classified as Least Concern due it being widespread and common and not in danger of extinction.
