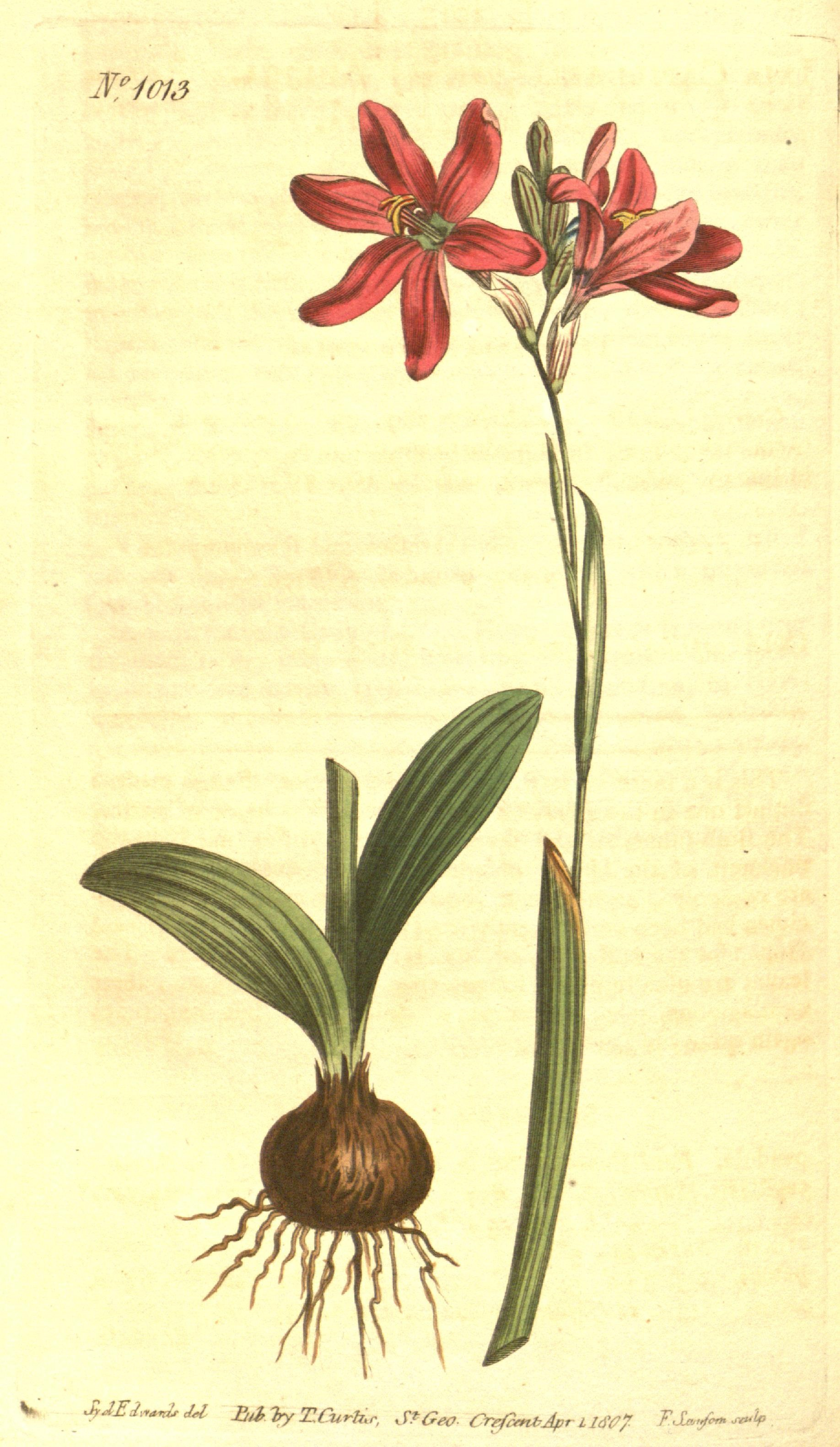

Scientific classification
- Kingdom: Plantae
- Clade: Tracheophytes
- Clade: Angiosperms
- Clade: Monocots
- Order: Asparagales
- Family: Iridaceae
- Genus: Ixia
- Species: I. capillaris

Binomial name
- Ixia capillaris L.f.

Synonyms
- Hyalis gracilis Salisb.; Ixia capillaris var. gracillima Ker Gawl.; Ixia gracilis Salisb.; Ixia tenella Klatt; Morphixia capillaris (L.f.) Ker Gawl.

= Ixia capillaris =

Species of flowering plant

Ixia capillaris is a perennial flowering plant and geophyte belonging to the genus Ixia and is part of the fynbos and renosterveld. The species is endemic to the Western Cape and occurs from Piketberg and the Koue Bokkeveld to Bot River and Riversdale. The species has lost more than 60% of its habitat to crop cultivation: vineyards, orchards and grain.
