= Ixia mostertii =

Conservation status
- Endangered (SANBI Red List)

Scientific classification
- Kingdom: Plantae
- Clade: Embryophytes
- Clade: Tracheophytes
- Clade: Spermatophytes
- Clade: Angiosperms
- Clade: Monocots
- Order: Asparagales
- Family: Iridaceae
- Genus: Ixia
- Species: I. mostertii

Binomial name
- Ixia mostertii M.P.de Vos

Species of flowering plant

Ixia mostertii is a perennial flowering plant and geophyte belonging to the genus Ixia and is part of the fynbos. The species is endemic to the Western Cape and occurs from Wolseley to Worcester. The plant has an area of occurrence of 82 km^{2} (32 sq mi) in the Breede River Valley and there are currently three subpopulations remaining, consisting of less than 1,000 plants. The species' habitat has decreased by 20% in the past 20 years due to development around Worcester and crop cultivation in the Breede River Valley. A third subpopulation has lost habitat due to the development of a golf course and casino.
