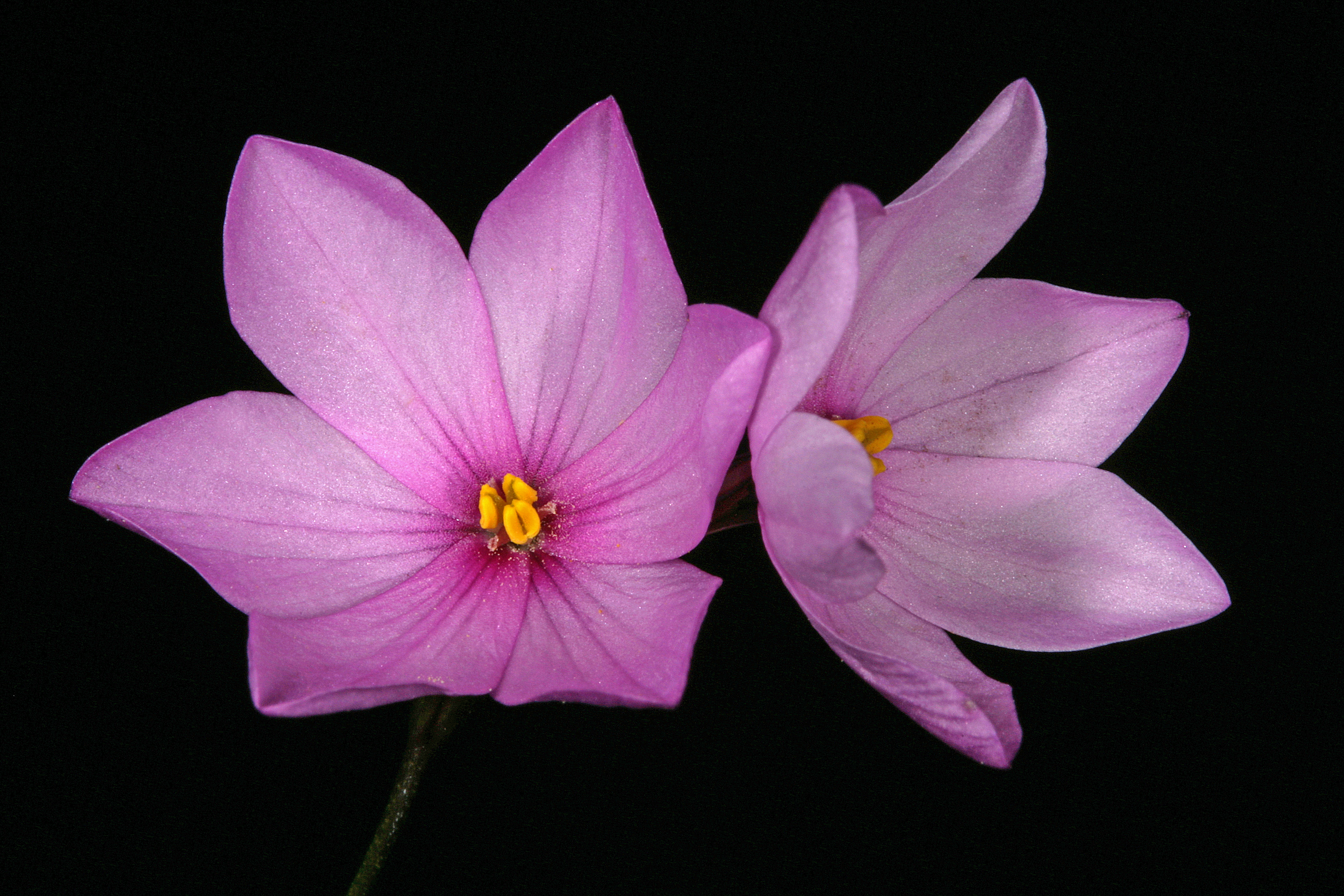

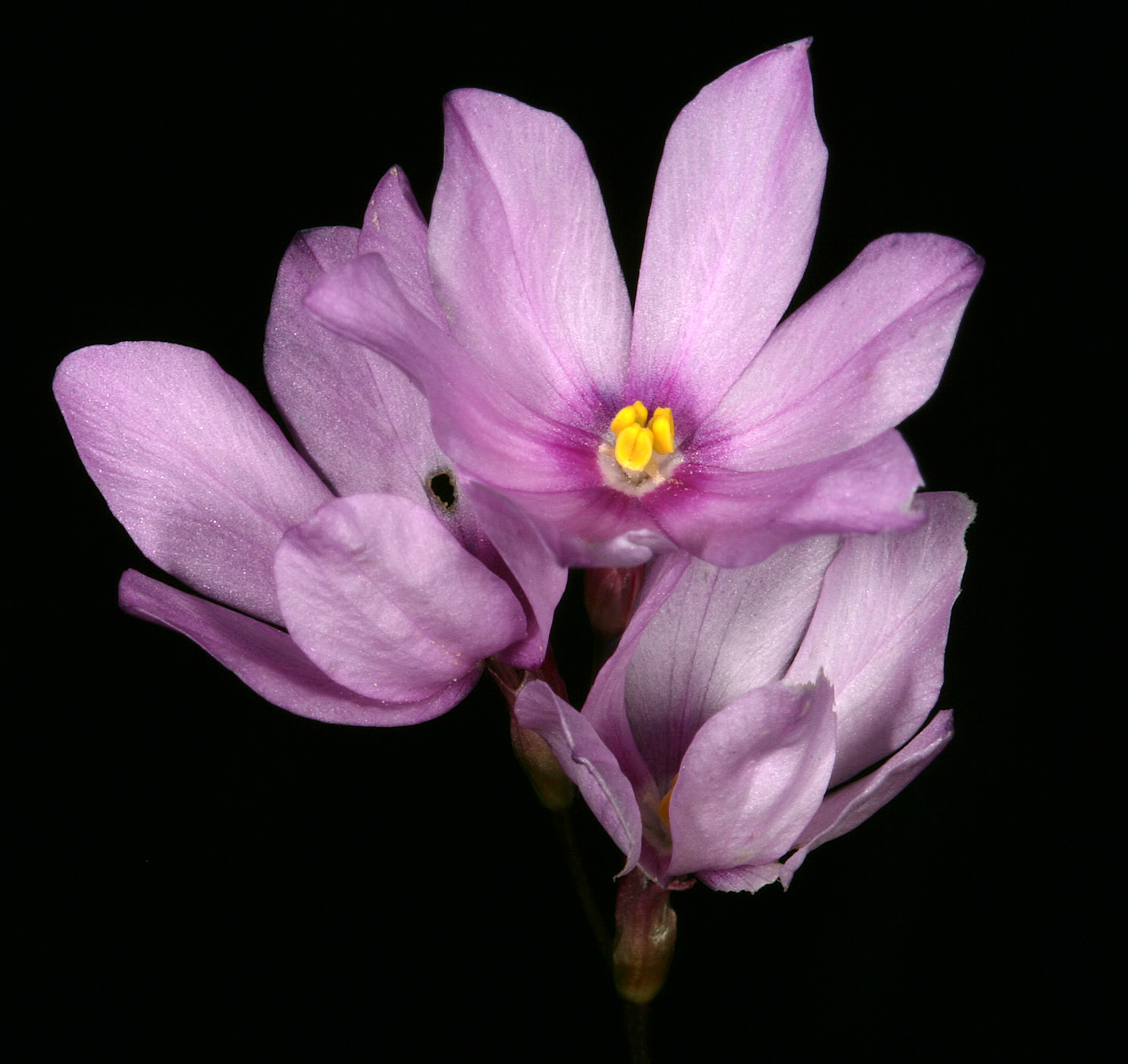

Scientific classification
- Kingdom: Plantae
- Clade: Tracheophytes
- Clade: Angiosperms
- Clade: Monocots
- Order: Asparagales
- Family: Iridaceae
- Genus: Ixia
- Species: I. micrandra

Binomial name
- Ixia micrandra Baker

= Ixia micrandra =

Species of flowering plant

Ixia micranda is a perennial flowering plant and geophyte belonging to the genus Ixia and is part of the fynbos. The species is endemic to the Western Cape and occurs from Houwhoek to Kleinmond and De Hoop. The plant has an area of occurrence of 4 078 km^{2}. The plant has lost its habitat to coastal development between Kleinmond and Hermanus, also to the planting of plantations in the Palmiet-Hoogland Mountains between Botrivier and Kleinmond. It is currently threatened by the planting of vineyards, the planting of proteas and invasive plants.
