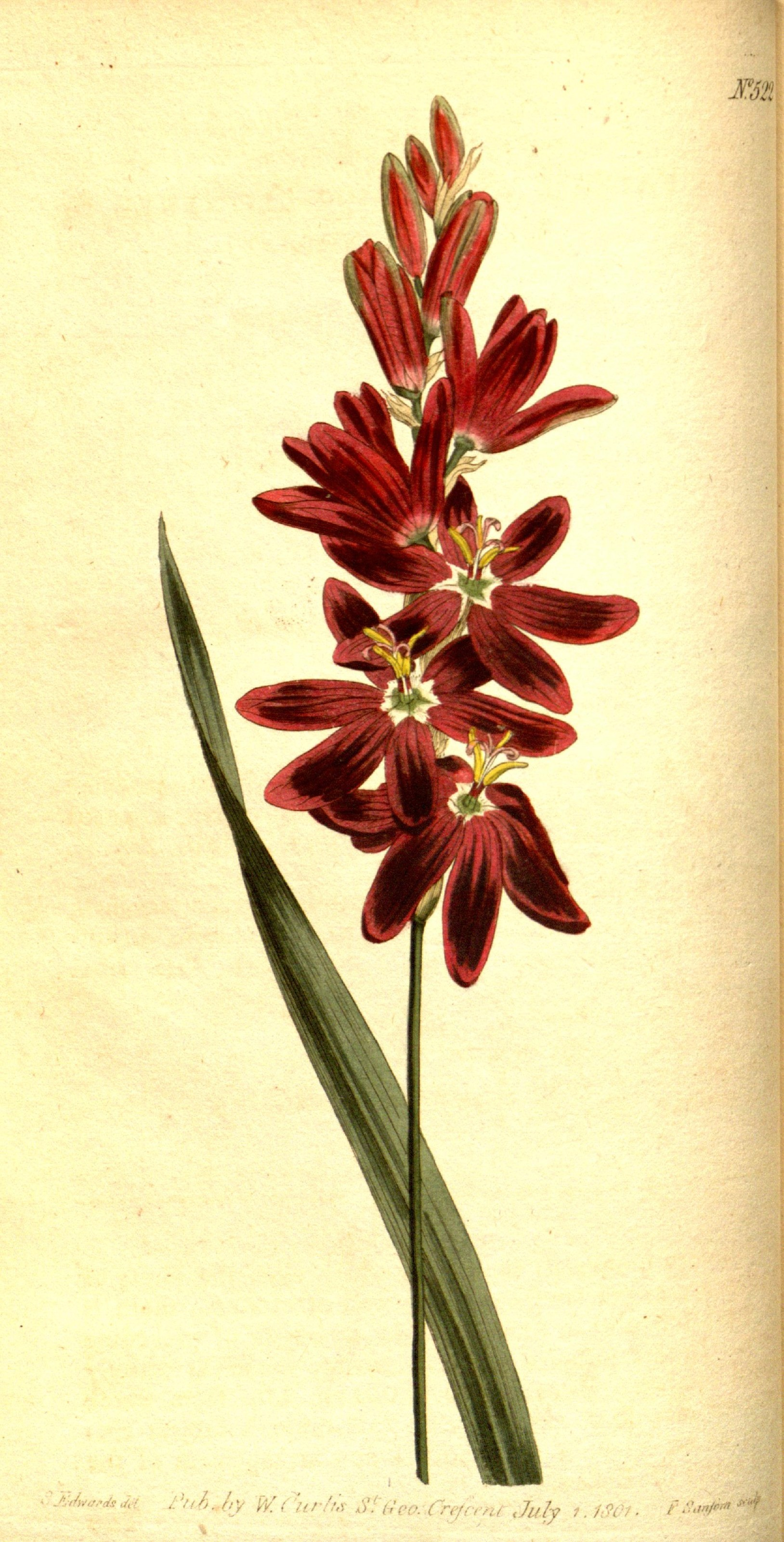

Scientific classification
- Kingdom: Plantae
- Clade: Tracheophytes
- Clade: Angiosperms
- Clade: Monocots
- Order: Asparagales
- Family: Iridaceae
- Genus: Ixia
- Species: I. patens

Binomial name
- Ixia patens Aiton

Synonyms
- Gladiolus pyramidalis Burm.f.; Ixia angusta L.Bolus; Ixia aristata Schneev.; Ixia densiflora Klatt; Ixia dispar N.E.Br.; Ixia filiformis Vent.; Ixia flaccida Salisb.; Ixia pallens Steud.; Ixia patens var. kermesina Regel; Ixia patens var. linearifolia G.J.Lewis; Ixia punicea Eckl.; Ixia punicea Spreng.; Ixia sprengeliana Schult.

= Ixia patens =

Species of flowering plant

Ixia patens is a perennial plant belonging to the genus Ixia and is part of the renosterveld. The species is endemic to the Western Cape and occurs in a small area between Villiersdorp and Worcester. The plant is threatened by crop cultivation.
