= Ixia vinacea =

Scientific classification
- Kingdom: Plantae
- Clade: Tracheophytes
- Clade: Angiosperms
- Clade: Monocots
- Order: Asparagales
- Family: Iridaceae
- Genus: Ixia
- Species: I. vinacea

Binomial name
- Ixia vinacea G.J.Lewis

Species of flowering plant

Ixia vinacea is a perennial flowering plant and geophyte belonging to the genus Ixia and is part of the fynbos. The species is endemic to the Western Cape and occurs at Tulbagh. The plant has a range of less than 2 km^{2} where the single population consists of less than 500 plants. The species has lost large parts of its habitat to agricultural activities and is currently threatened by uncontrolled wildfires, invasive plants and overgrazing.
