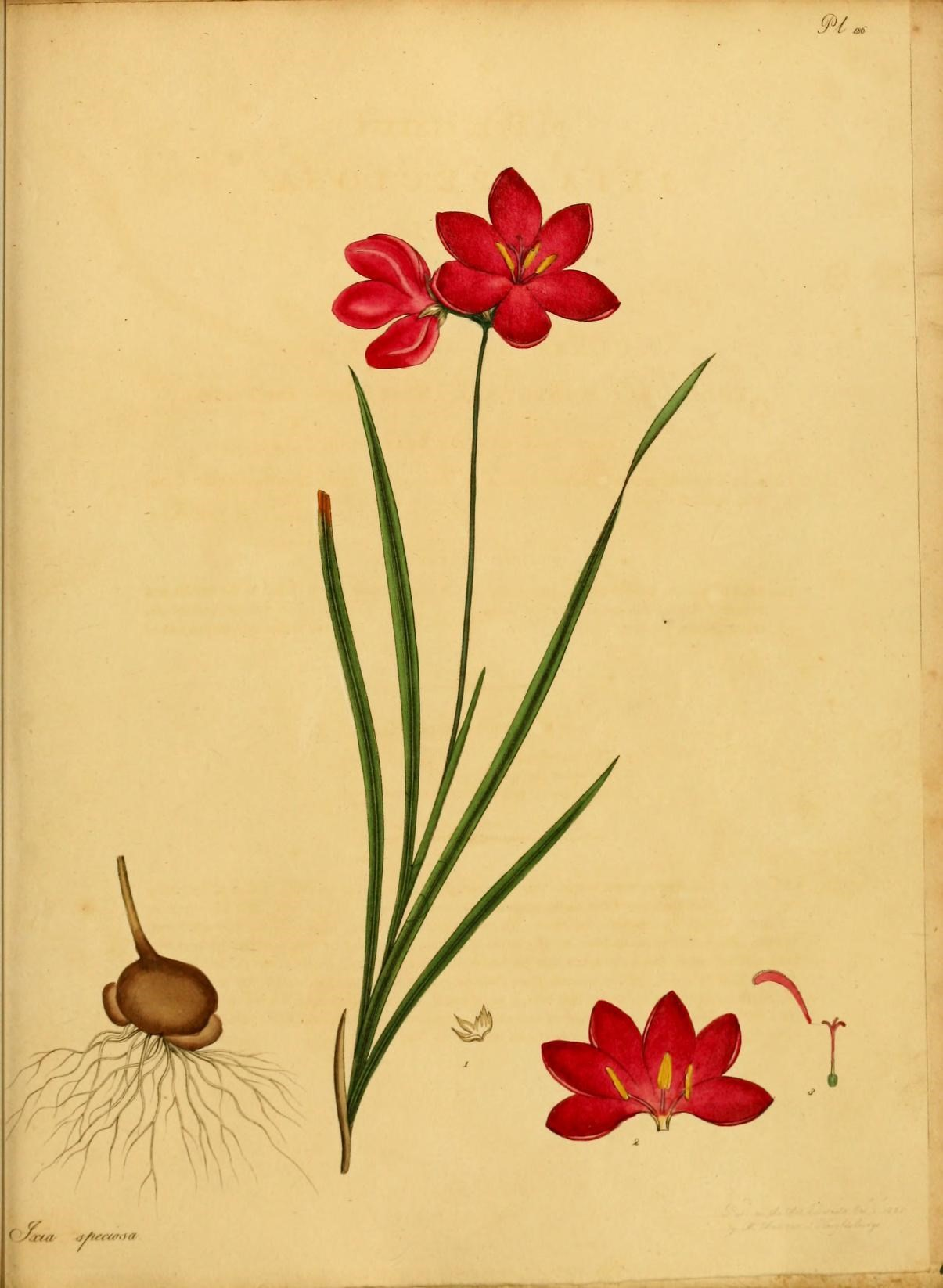

Scientific classification
- Kingdom: Plantae
- Clade: Tracheophytes
- Clade: Angiosperms
- Clade: Monocots
- Order: Asparagales
- Family: Iridaceae
- Genus: Ixia
- Species: I. campanulata

Binomial name
- Ixia campanulata Houtt.

Synonyms
- Geissorhiza anemoniflora (Jacq.) Klatt; Gladiolus coccineus (Thunb.) Schrank; Ixia anemoniflora Jacq.; Ixia aristata Thunb.; Ixia coccinea Eckl.; Ixia coccinea Thunb.; Ixia concolor Salisb.; Ixia crateroides Ker Gawl.; Ixia leucantha var. aristata (Thunb.) Baker; Ixia speciosa Andrews; Sparaxis anemoniflora (Jacq.) Ker Gawl.

= Ixia campanulata =

Species of flowering plant

Ixia campanulata is a perennial flowering plant and geophyte belonging to the genus Ixia and is part of the fynbos and renosterveld. The species is endemic to the Western Cape and occurs in the Breede River Valley between Tulbagh and Worcester. The plant has lost 60% of its habitat to crop cultivation and there are two, possibly three, fragmented subpopulations remaining. It is threatened by overgrazing, invasive plants and poor fire management.
