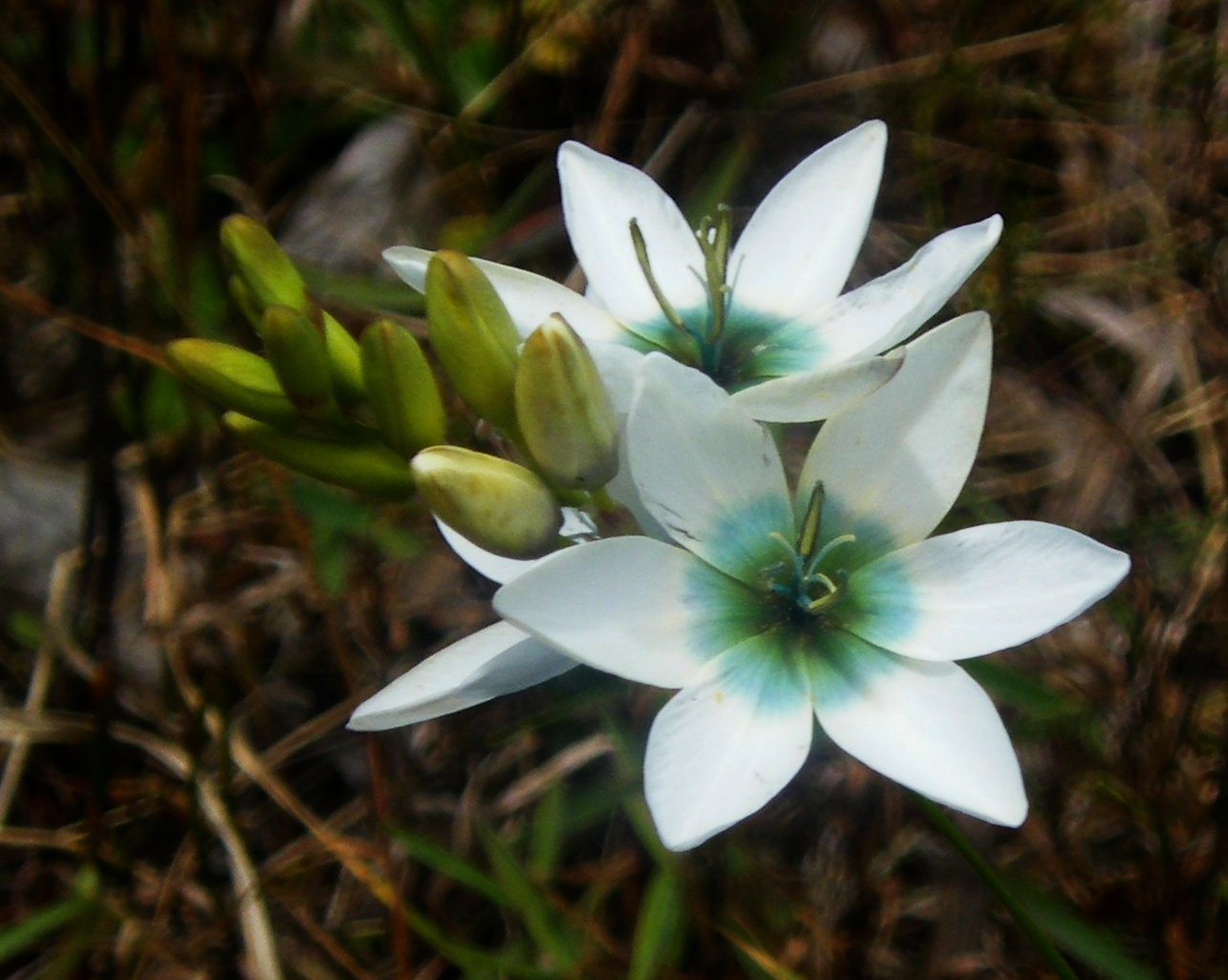

Scientific classification
- Kingdom: Plantae
- Clade: Tracheophytes
- Clade: Angiosperms
- Clade: Monocots
- Order: Asparagales
- Family: Iridaceae
- Genus: Ixia
- Species: I. polystachya

Binomial name
- Ixia polystachya L.

Synonyms
- Ixia aristata var. elegans (Regel) Baker; Ixia elegans (Regel) N.E.Br.; Ixia erecta P.J.Bergius; Ixia hybrida Ker Gawl.; Ixia leucantha Jacq.; Ixia maculata var. caesia Ker Gawl.; Ixia patens var. leucantha (Jacq.) Ker Gawl.; Ixia polystachya var. crassifolia G.J.Lewis; Ixia serotina Salisb.; Ixia viridiflora var. caesia (Ker Gawl.) Baker; Watsonia campanulata Klatt; Wuerthia elegans Regel

= Ixia polystachya =

Species of flowering plant

Ixia polystachya, the white-and-yellow-flower cornlily, is an Ixia species found on hills and slopes of northwest and southwest Cape, South Africa.
