= Ixia purpureorosea =

Scientific classification
- Kingdom: Plantae
- Clade: Tracheophytes
- Clade: Angiosperms
- Clade: Monocots
- Order: Asparagales
- Family: Iridaceae
- Genus: Ixia
- Species: I. purpureorosea

Binomial name
- Ixia purpureorosea G.J.Lewis

Species of flowering plant

Ixia purpureorosea is a perennial flowering plant and geophyte belonging to the genus Ixia and is part of the strandveld. The species is native to the Western Cape and occurs from Vredenburg to Saldanha. The plant is threatened by suburban development, coastal development and limestone mining. The total population is estimated to be less than 2 000 plants.
