= Ixia orientalis =

Scientific classification
- Kingdom: Plantae
- Clade: Tracheophytes
- Clade: Angiosperms
- Clade: Monocots
- Order: Asparagales
- Family: Iridaceae
- Genus: Ixia
- Species: I. orientalis

Binomial name
- Ixia orientalis L.Bolus

Synonyms
- Ixia scariosa var. longifolia Baker; Tritonia schlechteri Baker

Species of flowering plant

Ixia orientalis is a perennial flowering plant and geophyte belonging to the genus Ixia and is part of the fynbos. The species is endemic to the Eastern Cape and Western Cape and occurs from Caledon to Bathurst and the Amathole Mountains. This species is the most common and widespread species in the genus.
