= Ixia acaulis =

Scientific classification
- Kingdom: Plantae
- Clade: Tracheophytes
- Clade: Angiosperms
- Clade: Monocots
- Order: Asparagales
- Family: Iridaceae
- Genus: Ixia
- Species: I. acaulis

Binomial name
- Ixia acaulis Goldblatt & J.C.Manning

Species of flowering plant

Ixia acaulis is a perennial species of geophyte of 2–3 cm (0.79–1.18 in) tall in the family Iridaceae. It has one or few star-symmetrical flowers consisting of an upright, long, cylindrical perianth tube that emerges from the ground, is whitish at base and gradually changes to bright yellow, where it abruptly ends in 6 horizontally spreading or reflexed ovate tepals. From the perianth tube 3 clustered, upright stamens arise carrying creamy pollen. It has 3-5 prostrate to inclined, line-shaped to narrowly lance-shaped leaves. This species grows in limestone crevices in the vygieveld of the Knersvlakte, just north of the Saldanha railway between Garies and Bitterfontein in the Western Cape province of South Africa. The plant has an area of occurrence of 35 km^{2} and on all three properties where it occurs, prospecting work is being done for limestone and its exploitation. The species is considered endangered because of its small distribution and the threat of limestone mining.
