= Ixia longituba =

Scientific classification
- Kingdom: Plantae
- Clade: Tracheophytes
- Clade: Angiosperms
- Clade: Monocots
- Order: Asparagales
- Family: Iridaceae
- Genus: Ixia
- Species: I. longituba

Binomial name
- Ixia longituba N.E.Br.

Species of flowering plant

Ixia longituba is a perennial flowering plant and geophyte belonging to the genus Ixia and is part of the fynbos. The species is endemic to the Western Cape and occurs from the Bot River to Swellendam and Bredasdorp. The species has lost large parts of its habitat to crop cultivation. The remaining subpopulations are fragmented and are threatened by overgrazing, lack of fire and invasive plants.

The plant has one subspecies:Ixia longituba subsp. macrosiphon Goldblatt & J.C.Manning
