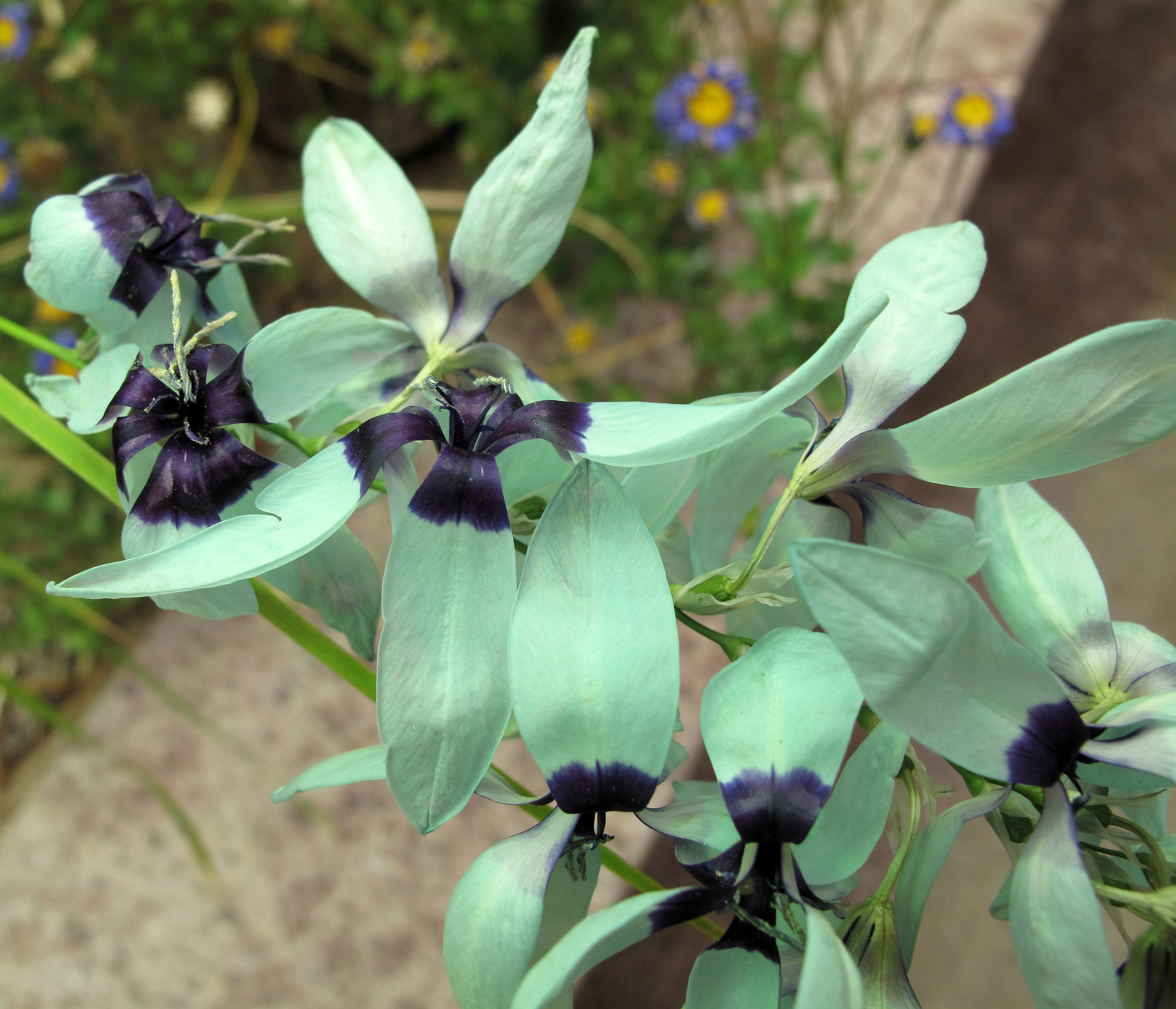

Scientific classification
- Kingdom: Plantae
- Clade: Tracheophytes
- Clade: Angiosperms
- Clade: Monocots
- Order: Asparagales
- Family: Iridaceae
- Genus: Ixia
- Species: I. viridiflora

Binomial name
- Ixia viridiflora Lam.

= Ixia viridiflora =

Species of flowering plant

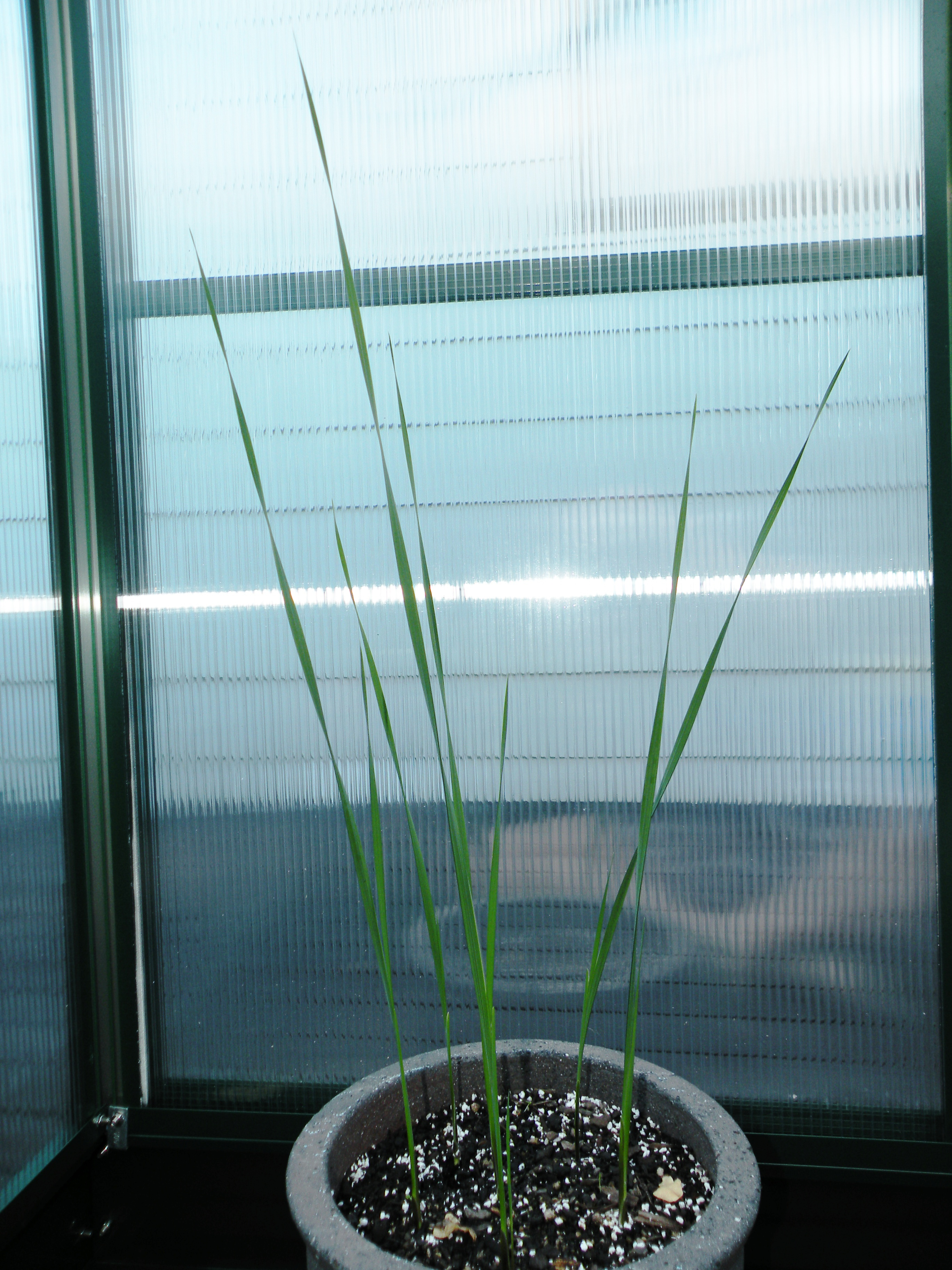
Ixia viridiflora leaves

Ixia viridiflora, also known as turquoise ixia, is a tall member of the genus Ixia. It comes from around the Tulbagh in South Africa, Cape Province. It has small corms under the ground.

This corn lily is very rare. Its habitats are often destroyed by human influence. As a consequence, its conservation status is vulnerable and is tending to worsen.

The name turquoise ixia refers to the blue-green turquoise colour of the flowers, which is a rare colour for flowers. They are grouped in long inflorescences and are normally star-shaped as in most corn lilies. The flowers have a black-purple centre. The ovary is 3-locular. The flower is pollinated by specific scarab beetles known as monkey beetles of the tribe Hopliini.

The turquoise ixia has good ornamental traits but it is rarely cultivated due to its conservation status.
