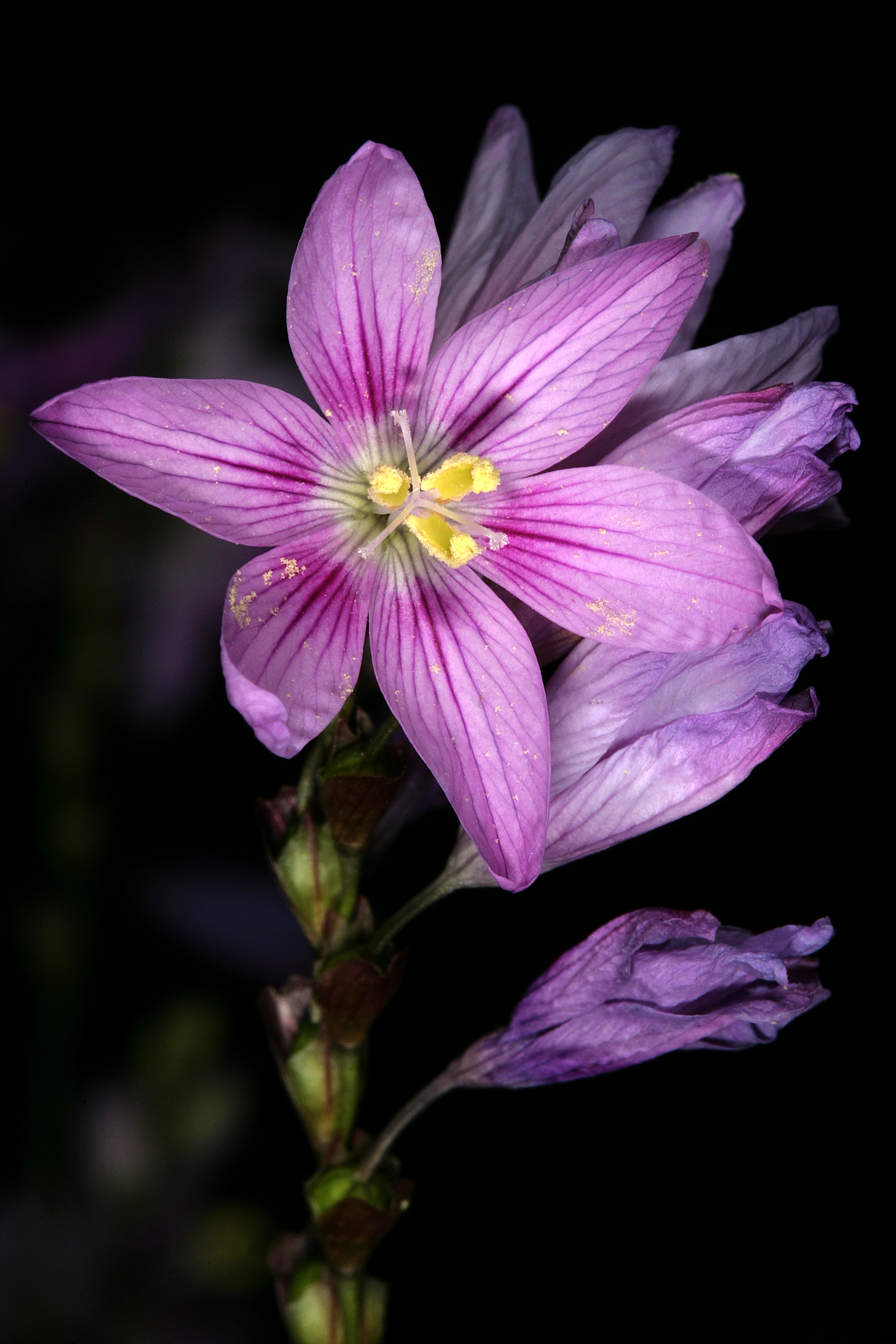

Scientific classification
- Kingdom: Plantae
- Clade: Tracheophytes
- Clade: Angiosperms
- Clade: Monocots
- Order: Asparagales
- Family: Iridaceae
- Genus: Ixia
- Species: I. flexuosa

Binomial name
- Ixia flexuosa L.

Synonyms
- Ixia pallide-rosea Eckl.

= Ixia flexuosa =

Species of flowering plant

Ixia flexuosa is a perennial flowering plant and geophyte belonging to the genus Ixia and is part of the vygieveld. The species is endemic to the Western Cape and occurs from the Cape Peninsula to Riversdale, Still Bay and Bredasdorp.
