= Ixia brunneobractea =

Scientific classification
- Kingdom: Plantae
- Clade: Tracheophytes
- Clade: Angiosperms
- Clade: Monocots
- Order: Asparagales
- Family: Iridaceae
- Genus: Ixia
- Species: I. brunneobractea

Binomial name
- Ixia brunneobractea G.J.Lewis

Species of flowering plant

Ixia brunneobractea is a perennial flowering plant and geophyte belonging to the genus Ixia and is part of the fynbos. The species is endemic to the Northern Cape and occurs on the Roggeveld Mountains. The plant has a range of 107 km². The species' habitat is threatened by the ever-expanding rooibos tea industry.
