= Ixia stricta =

Scientific classification
- Kingdom: Plantae
- Clade: Tracheophytes
- Clade: Angiosperms
- Clade: Monocots
- Order: Asparagales
- Family: Iridaceae
- Genus: Ixia
- Species: I. stricta

Binomial name
- Ixia stricta (Eckl. ex Klatt) G.J.Lewis

Synonyms
- Agretta retusa (Salisb.) Steud.; Agretta stricta Eckl.; Ixia polystachya Jacq.; Ixia polystachya var. intermedia Andrews; Ixia retusa Salisb.; Tritonia scillaris var. stricta (Eckl. ex Klatt) Baker; Tritonixia stricta Eckl. ex Klatt

Species of flowering plant

Ixia stricta is a perennial flowering plant and geophyte belonging to the genus Ixia and is part of the fynbos. The species is endemic to the Western Cape and occurs from Houwhoek to Bredasdorp. The plant has a range of 2 188 km². The species has lost large parts of its habitat to crop cultivation, overgrazing, invasive plants and uncontrolled veldfires. In the Houwhoek area and Groenlandberg, plantations have destroyed large parts of the habitat. The threats still exist.
