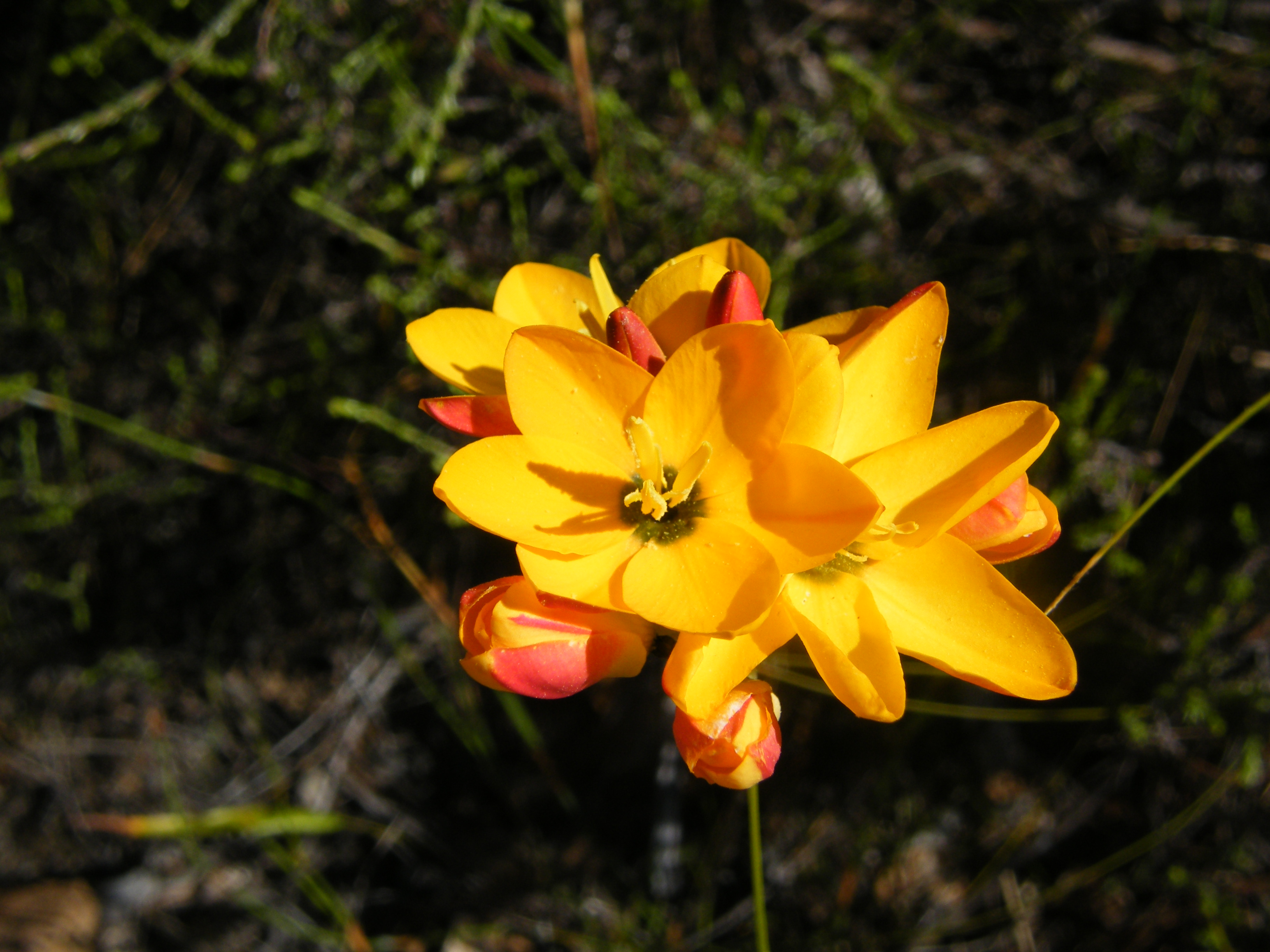

Scientific classification
- Kingdom: Plantae
- Clade: Tracheophytes
- Clade: Angiosperms
- Clade: Monocots
- Order: Asparagales
- Family: Iridaceae
- Genus: Ixia
- Species: I. dubia

Binomial name
- Ixia dubia Vent.

= Ixia dubia =

Species of flowering plant

Ixia dubia is an Ixia species found growing in granite slopes from Piketberg to Caldon, South Africa.
