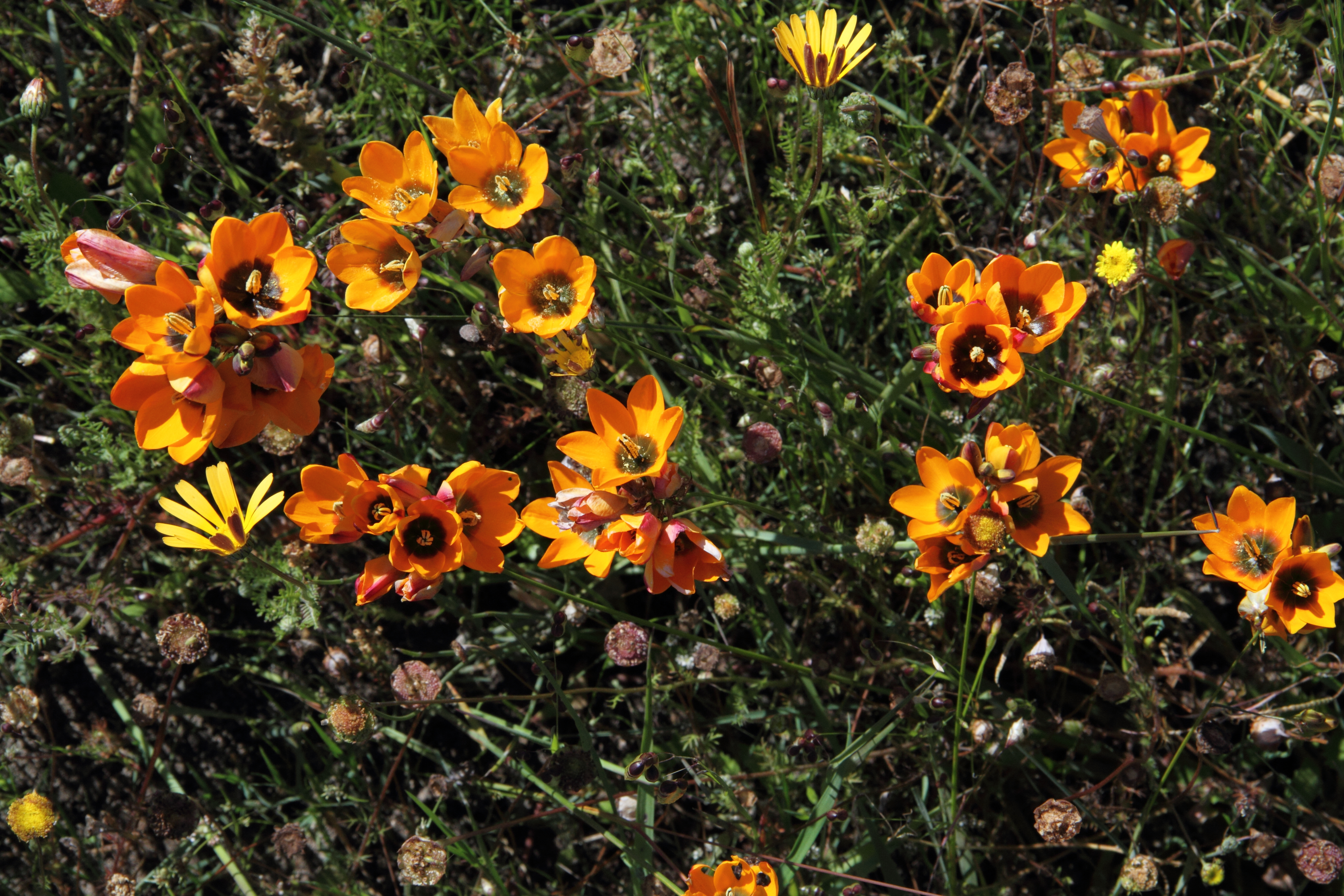

Scientific classification
- Kingdom: Plantae
- Clade: Tracheophytes
- Clade: Angiosperms
- Clade: Monocots
- Order: Asparagales
- Family: Iridaceae
- Genus: Ixia
- Species: I. maculata

Binomial name
- Ixia maculata L.

= Ixia maculata =

Species of flowering plant

Ixia maculata is a species of flowering plant in the family Iridaceae known by the common name spotted African corn lily. It is native to the Cape Provinces of South Africa, but it is grown widely as an ornamental plant. It can also be found growing wild as an introduced species in several areas, including Western Australia. This perennial flower grows 20 to 70 centimeters tall with an erect, unbranched stem. There are a few twisting basal leaves up to 35 centimeters long. The inflorescence is a dense, showy spike of up to 12 flowers, usually orange to yellow in color, sometimes with areas of purple or red and often with spots; the coloration in garden plants varies due to breeding.
