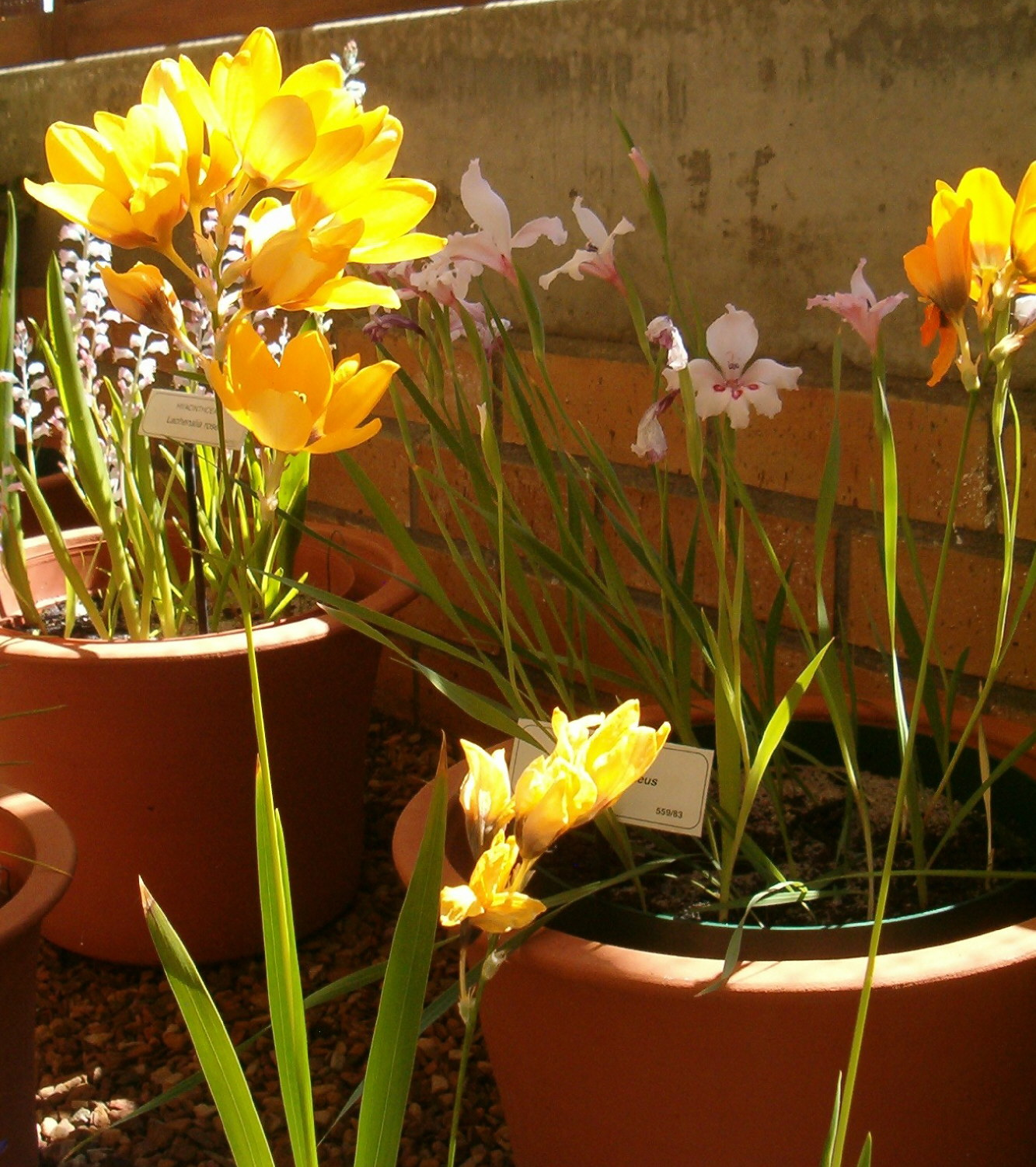

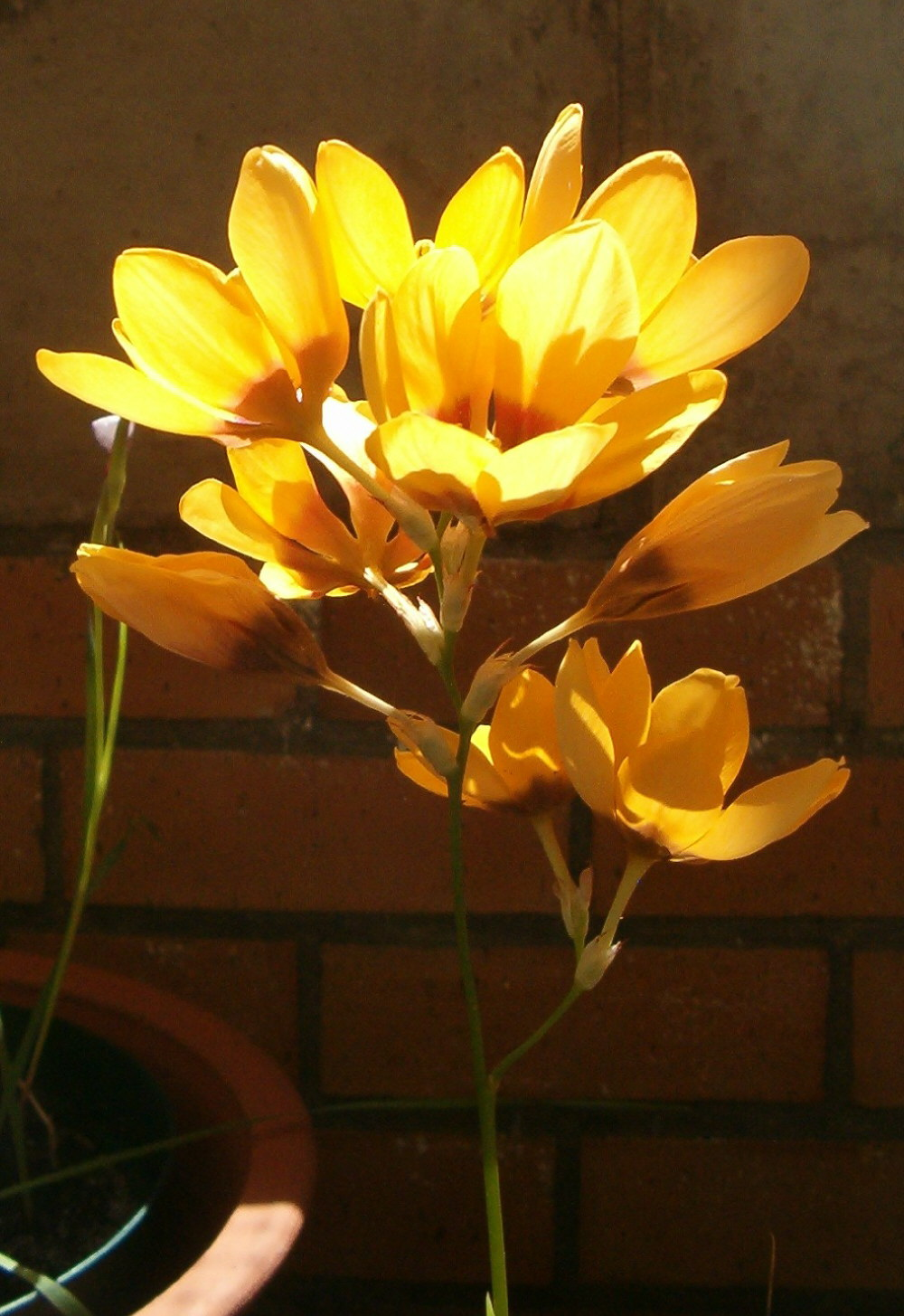

Scientific classification
- Kingdom: Plantae
- Clade: Tracheophytes
- Clade: Angiosperms
- Clade: Monocots
- Order: Asparagales
- Family: Iridaceae
- Genus: Ixia
- Species: I. curta

Binomial name
- Ixia curta Andrews

Synonyms
- Ixia monadelpha var. curta (Andrews) Ker Gawl.; Morphixia curta (Andrews) Klatt

= Ixia curta =

Species of flowering plant

Ixia curta is a perennial flowering plant and geophyte belonging to the genus Ixia and is part of the fynbos and renosterveld. The species is endemic to the Western Cape and occurs from Darling to Malmesbury. The species has lost 60% of its habitat to crop cultivation and there are between seven and nine fragmented subpopulations remaining that are threatened by invasive species and inadequate fire management. Insecticides and fertilizers, as used in the fields, also cause pollinators to decline, which is to the advantage of invasive species.
