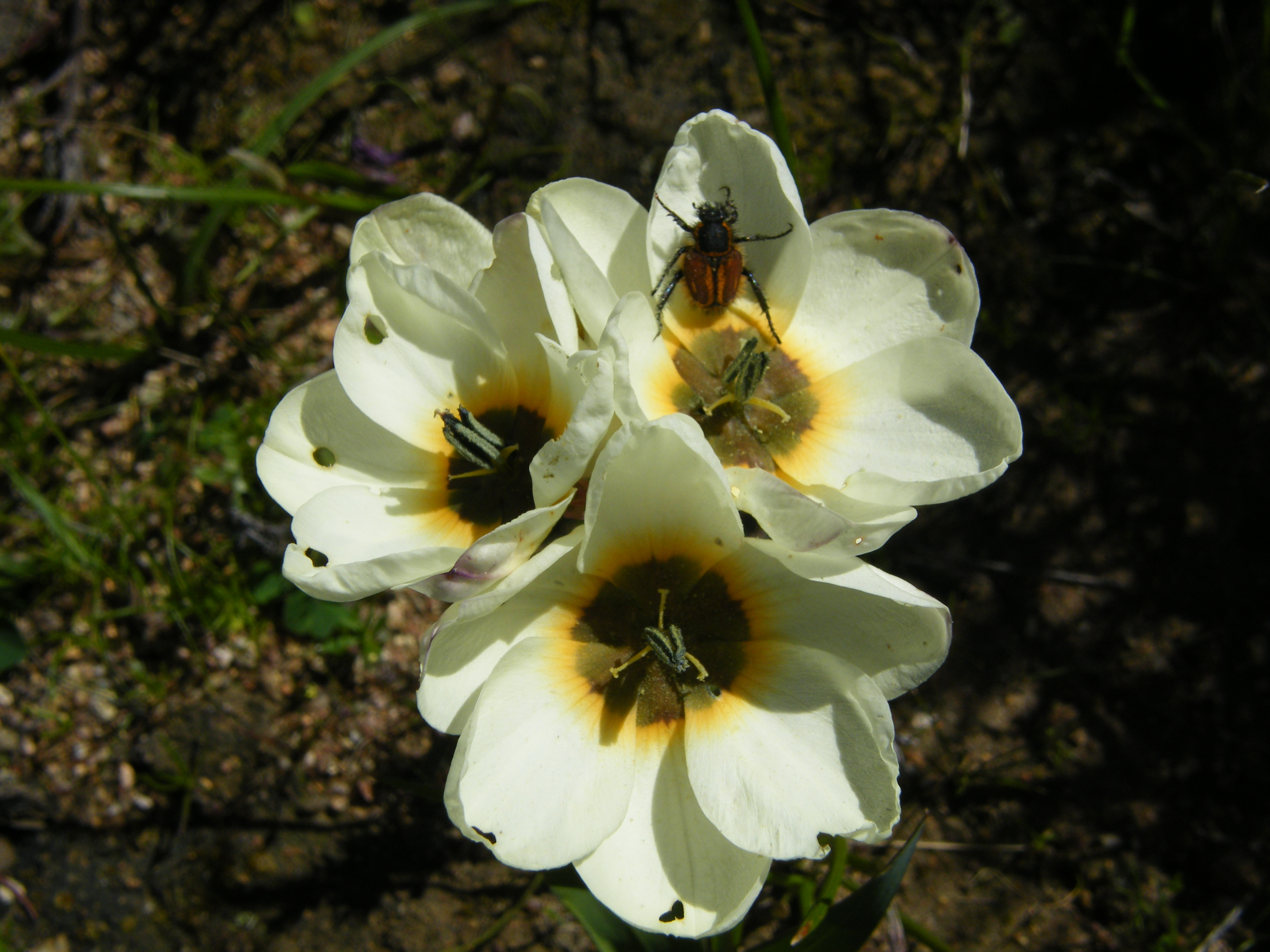

Scientific classification
- Kingdom: Plantae
- Clade: Tracheophytes
- Clade: Angiosperms
- Clade: Monocots
- Order: Asparagales
- Family: Iridaceae
- Genus: Ixia
- Species: I. abbreviata

Binomial name
- Ixia abbreviata Houtt.

Synonyms
- Ixia abbreviata var. ovata (Andrews) Goldblatt & J.C.Manning; Ixia alboflavens Eckl.; Ixia capitata var. ovata Andrews; Ixia conferta R.C.Foster; Ixia lutea Eckl.; Ixia lutea var. ovata (Andrews) B.Nord.; Ixia nigroalbida Klatt; Ixia ochroleuca (Ker Gawl.) Sweet; Ixia ovata (Andrews) Sweet

= Ixia abbreviata =

Species of flowering plant

Ixia abbreviata, also known Ixia lutea, is a perennial flowering plant and geophyte belonging to the genus Ixia and is part of the fynbos and renosterveld. The species is endemic to the Western Cape and occurs from Citrusdal and Piketberg to Malmesbury, Paarl and Tulbagh. There are between nine and twelve subpopulations that are severely fragmented, the result of grain production and urban development. The process is ongoing, the threat still exists. The largest subpopulation is at the Elandskloof Mountain, north of Wellington. The other subpopulations consist of less than 200 plants per group.
