= Bothalia: African Biodiversity & Conservation =

South African peer-reviewed open access scientific journal

African Biodiversity & Conservation Journal
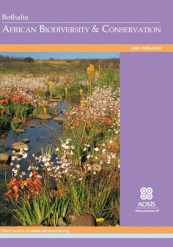
- Discipline: African conservation, Biodiversity, Zoology, Botany
- Language: English
- Edited by: Dr. Anthony R. Magee & Dr John Wilson

Publication details
- Former names: Bothalia (1922–2014); Bothalia: African Biodiversity & Conservation (2014–present)
- History: 1922–present
- Publisher: South African National Biodiversity Institute (SANBI) (South Africa)
- Frequency: Yearly
- Open access: Yes
- License: Creative Commons Attribution 4.0

Standard abbreviations
- ISO 4: ABC

Indexing
- ISSN: 3078-8048 (print); 3078-8056 (web)

Links
- Journal homepage; Online archive

African Biodiversity & Conservation Journal, formerly known as Bothalia: African Biodiversity & Conservation and earlier simply Bothalia, is a South African peer-reviewed open access scientific journal covering African biodiversity, conservation science, zoology, and botany. It is published by the South African National Biodiversity Institute (SANBI). The journal is indexed under its current title in major databases, while earlier articles remain listed under the name Bothalia.

== Description ==
The journal publishes peer-reviewed research focused on African biodiversity and conservation. It operates as an open access journal, providing free access to all published content. Articles are published online continuously as they are accepted, with compiled issues released annually.

The journal is managed by the South African National Biodiversity Institute and provides a platform for research that supports biodiversity science, conservation planning, and environmental management in Africa.

== History ==
The journal was established in 1921, producing its first issue in 1922, as an in-house journal of South Africa's National Botanical Institute. It was formally known as Bothalia from 1922 to 2014. In 2014, the title was expanded to Bothalia: African Biodiversity & Conservation to reflect a broader scope aligned with the mandate of the South African National Biodiversity Institute. The journal is currently published under the name African Biodiversity & Conservation Journal.

In 2004, the National Botanical Institute was incorporated into the South African National Biodiversity Institute under the National Environmental Management: Biodiversity Act. The journal was named after the first Prime Minister of South Africa, Louis Botha, who was Minister of Agriculture from 1910 to 1913.

== Scope ==
The journal publishes research on African biodiversity and conservation, including botany, zoology, ecological assessment, and conservation management. It includes original research articles, reviews, and short communications addressing biodiversity science and policy-relevant conservation outcomes.

== Editorial team ==
The journal is managed by Ieslaah Isaacs at the South African National Biodiversity Institute.

The production editorial team includes:

- Production Editor: Yolande Steenkamp (South African National Biodiversity Institute, South Africa)
- Assistant Production Editor: Nicole Meyer (South African National Biodiversity Institute, South Africa)
- Layout Editor: Elizma Fouche (South African National Biodiversity Institute, South Africa)

== Contact ==
Information about the journal and submission enquiries is available on the journal’s official contact page.
