= Tritonia flabellifolia var. thomasiae =

Scientific classification
- Kingdom: Plantae
- Clade: Tracheophytes
- Clade: Angiosperms
- Clade: Monocots
- Order: Asparagales
- Family: Iridaceae
- Genus: Tritonia
- Species: T. flabellifolia
- Variety: T. f. var. thomasiae

Trinomial name
- Tritonia flabellifolia var. thomasiae M.P.de Vos

Variety of plant

Tritonia flabellifolia var. thomasiae is a perennial flowering plant belonging to the genus Tritonia and is part of the fynbos. The species is endemic to the Western Cape and occurs from Hawston to Bot River. There is one population near Bot River which was last recorded in 1968 as the species has lost habitat to crop cultivation and invasive plants. The species may be extinct.
