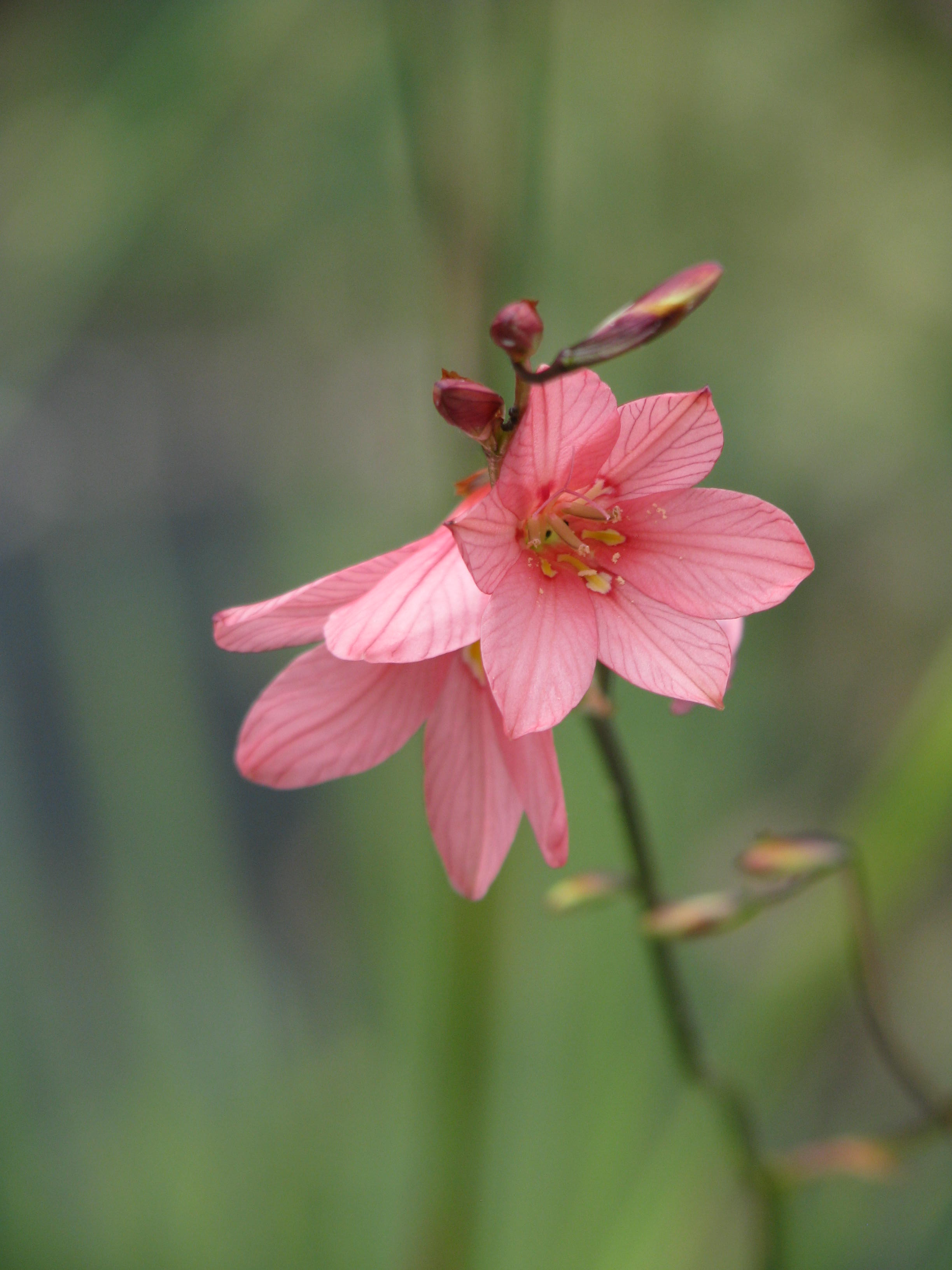

Scientific classification
- Kingdom: Plantae
- Clade: Tracheophytes
- Clade: Angiosperms
- Clade: Monocots
- Order: Asparagales
- Family: Iridaceae
- Genus: Tritonia
- Species: T. disticha
- Subspecies: T. d. subsp. rubrolucens

Trinomial name
- Tritonia disticha subsp. rubrolucens (R.C.Foster) M.P.de Vos

Synonyms
- Ixia amoena Link; Tritonia rubrolucens R.C.Foster

= Tritonia disticha subsp. rubrolucens =

Subspecies of plant

Tritonia disticha subsp. rubrolucens is a perennial flowering plant belonging to the genus Tritonia. The species is native to KwaZulu-Natal, Mpumalanga, Eastern Cape, Western Cape, Free State and Eswatini. The species currently has no threats.
