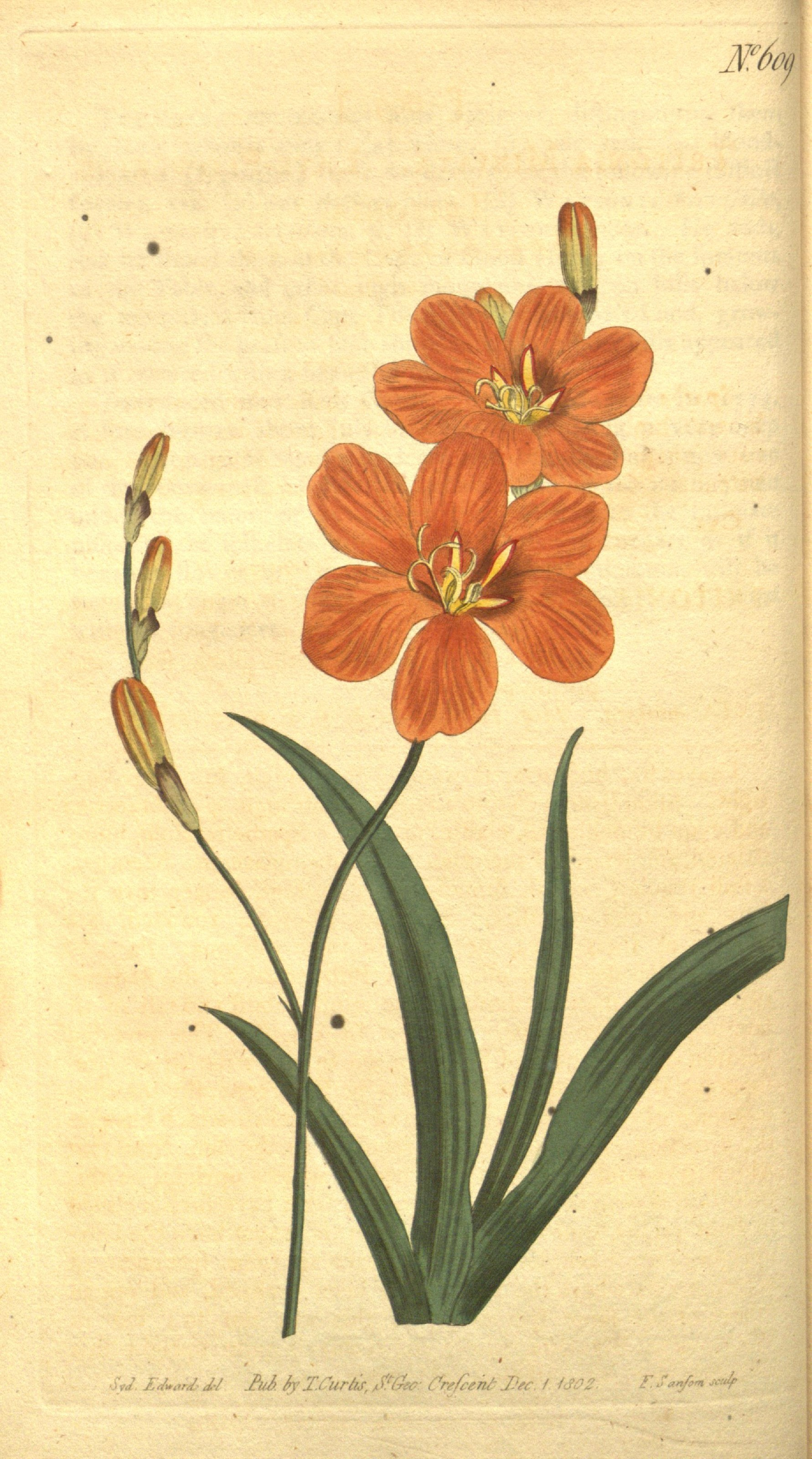

Scientific classification
- Kingdom: Plantae
- Clade: Tracheophytes
- Clade: Angiosperms
- Clade: Monocots
- Order: Asparagales
- Family: Iridaceae
- Genus: Tritonia
- Species: T. deusta
- Subspecies: T. d. subsp. miniata

Trinomial name
- Tritonia deusta subsp. miniata (Jacq.) M.P.de Vos

Synonyms
- Crocosmia miniata (Jacq.) Planch.; Ixia aurantiaca (Eckl.) Czerw.; Ixia miniata Jacq.; Montbretia miniata (Jacq.) Voigt; Tritonia aurantiaca Eckl.; Tritonia miniata (Jacq.) Ker Gawl.; Tritonixia miniata (Jacq.) Klatt; Waitzia miniata (Jacq.) Kreysig

= Tritonia deusta subsp. miniata =

Subspecies of plant

Tritonia deusta subsp. miniata is a perennial flowering plant belonging to the genus Tritonia and is part of the fynbos. The species is endemic to the Western Cape.
