= Tritonia flabellifolia var. major =

Scientific classification
- Kingdom: Plantae
- Clade: Tracheophytes
- Clade: Angiosperms
- Clade: Monocots
- Order: Asparagales
- Family: Iridaceae
- Genus: Tritonia
- Species: T. flabellifolia
- Variety: T. f. var. major

Trinomial name
- Tritonia flabellifolia var. major (Ker Gawl.) M.P.de Vos

Synonyms
- Freesea secunda Eckl.; Gladiolus roseus Jacq.; Montbretia rosea (Jacq.) Voigt; Tritonia rosea (Jacq.) Dryand.; Tritonia secunda (Eckl.) Steud.; Tritonixia rosea (Jacq.) Klatt; Waitzia rosea (Jacq.) Heynh.; Watsonia amoena Pers.

Variety of plant

Tritonia flabellifolia var. major is a perennial flowering plant belonging to the genus Tritonia. The species is endemic to the Western Cape and currently has no threats.
