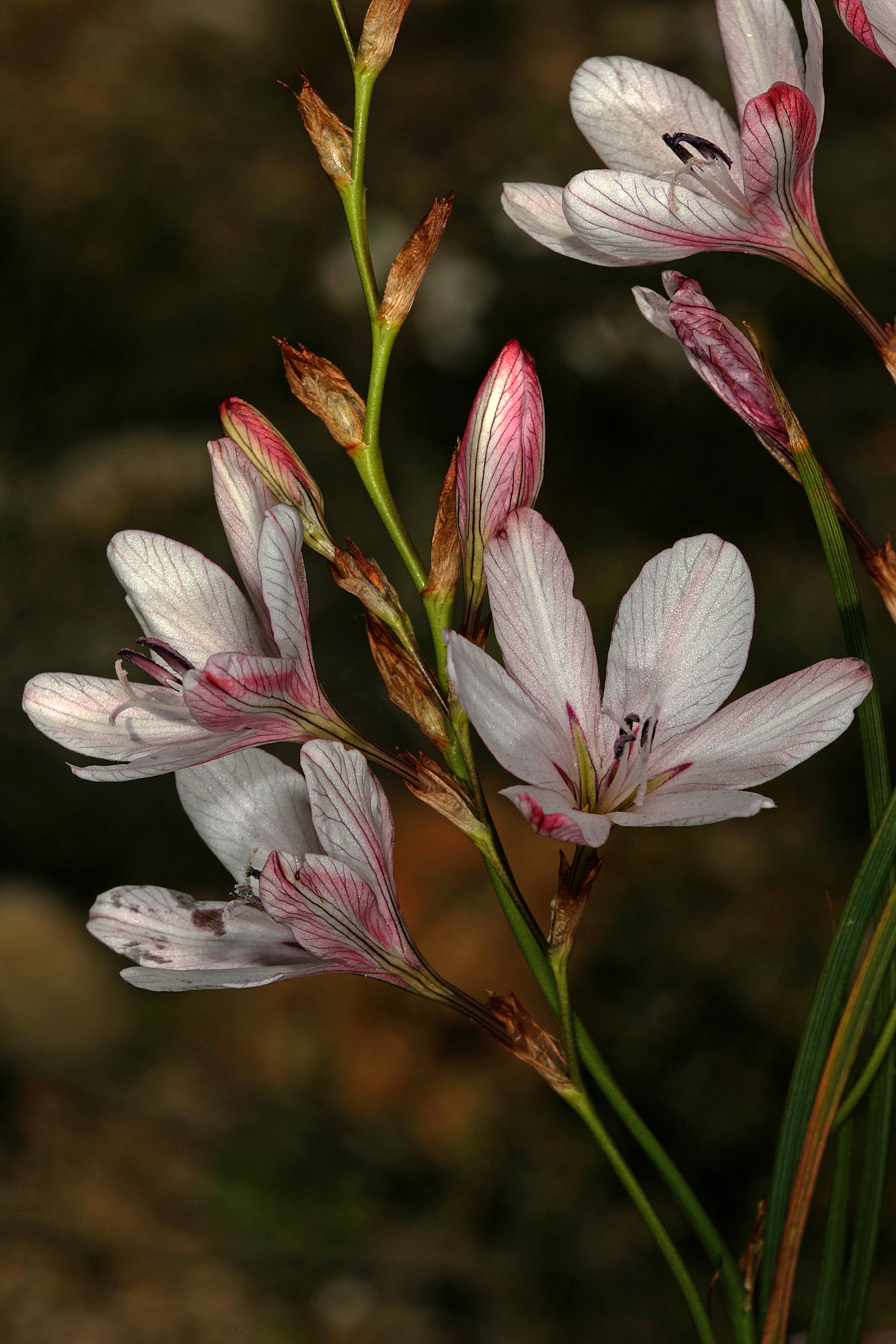

Scientific classification
- Kingdom: Plantae
- Clade: Tracheophytes
- Clade: Angiosperms
- Clade: Monocots
- Order: Asparagales
- Family: Iridaceae
- Genus: Tritonia
- Species: T. bakeri
- Subspecies: T. b. subsp. lilacina

Trinomial name
- Tritonia bakeri subsp. lilacina (L.Bolus) M.P.de Vos, (1983)

Synonyms
- Tritonia lilacina L.Bolus

= Tritonia bakeri subsp. lilacina =

Subspecies of plant

Tritonia bakeri subsp. lilacina is a perennial flowering plant and geophyte belonging to the genus Tritonia. The species is endemic to the Eastern Cape and the Western Cape. It currently has no threats.
