= Syringodea derustensis =

Scientific classification
- Kingdom: Plantae
- Clade: Tracheophytes
- Clade: Angiosperms
- Clade: Monocots
- Order: Asparagales
- Family: Iridaceae
- Genus: Syringodea
- Species: S. derustensis

Binomial name
- Syringodea derustensis M.P.de Vos, (1974)

Species of flowering plant

Syringodea derustensis is a perennial flowering plant and geophyte belonging to the genus Syringodea and is part of the fynbos. The species is endemic to the Western Cape and occurs in the Klein Karoo, from Oudtshoorn to De Rust. The plant has a range of 592 km^{2} and has lost habitat to development and crop cultivation, especially at De Rust. At Dysselsdorp, habitat has been lost to dam construction. Ostrich farming is also a potential threat.
