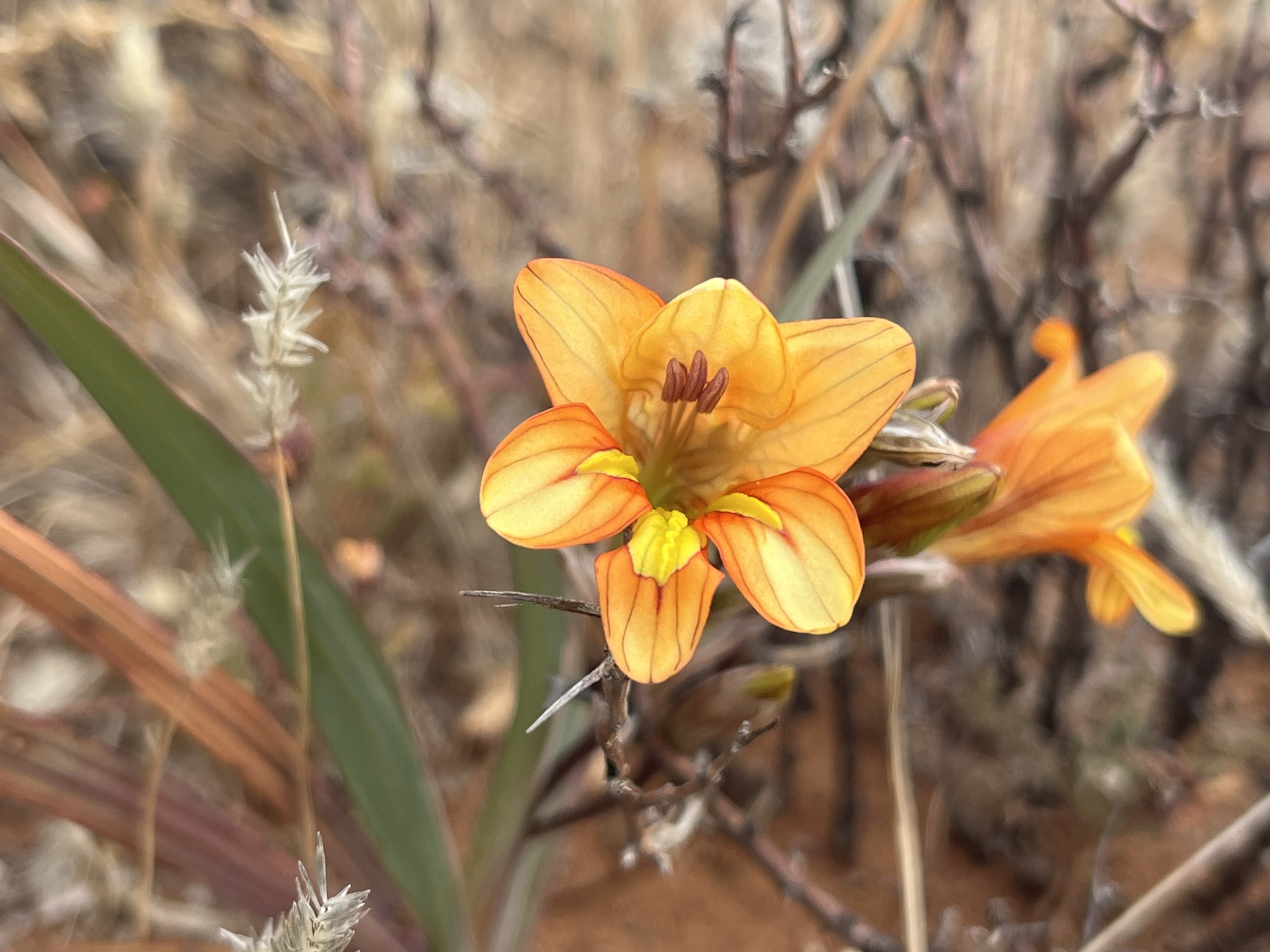

Scientific classification
- Kingdom: Plantae
- Clade: Embryophytes
- Clade: Tracheophytes
- Clade: Spermatophytes
- Clade: Angiosperms
- Clade: Monocots
- Order: Asparagales
- Family: Iridaceae
- Genus: Tritonia
- Species: T. karooica

Binomial name
- Tritonia karooica M.P.de Vos, (1983)

= Tritonia karooica =

Species of flowering plant

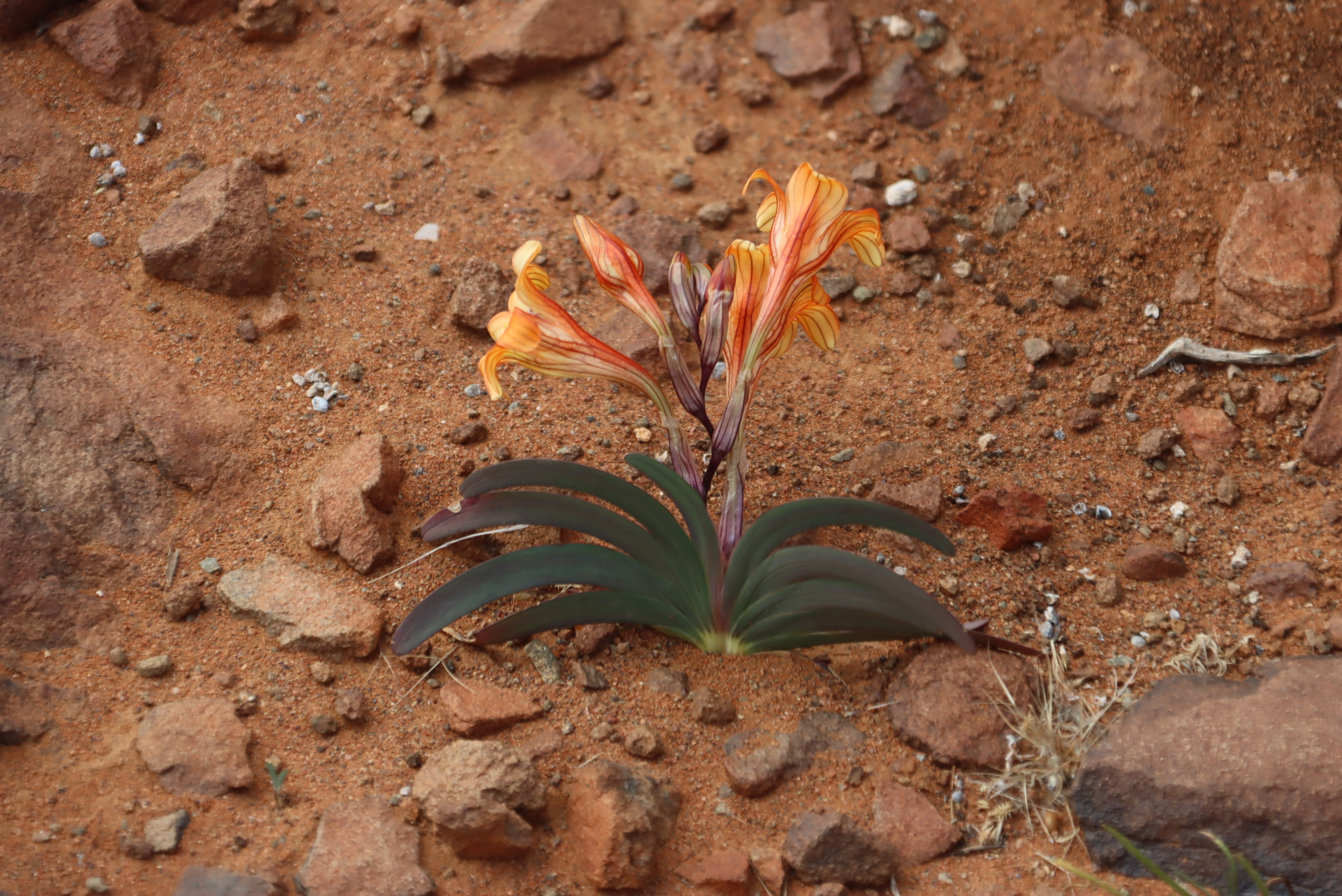
Tritonia karooica

Tritonia karooica is a bulbous geophyte belonging to the genus Tritonia. The species is endemic to the Northern Cape and Western Cape.
