= Tritonia pallida subsp. tayloriae =

Scientific classification
- Kingdom: Plantae
- Clade: Tracheophytes
- Clade: Angiosperms
- Clade: Monocots
- Order: Asparagales
- Family: Iridaceae
- Genus: Tritonia
- Species: T. pallida
- Subspecies: T. p. subsp. tayloriae

Trinomial name
- Tritonia pallida subsp. tayloriae (L.Bolus) M.P.de Vos

Synonyms
- Tritonia tayloriae L.Bolus

Subspecies of plant

Tritonia pallida subsp. tayloriae is a perennial flowering plant belonging to the genus Tritonia and is part of the fynbos and renosterveld. The species is endemic to the Western Cape and occurs between Montagu to Ladismith and from Caledon to Riversdale. The species has lost its habitat to the planting of vineyards and orchards and is currently threatened by invasive alien plants.
