= Tritonia securigera subsp. securigera =

Scientific classification
- Kingdom: Plantae
- Clade: Tracheophytes
- Clade: Angiosperms
- Clade: Monocots
- Order: Asparagales
- Family: Iridaceae
- Genus: Tritonia
- Species: T. securigera (Aiton) Ker Gawl., (1804)
- Subspecies: T. s. subsp. securigera

Trinomial name
- Tritonia securigera subsp. securigera

Synonyms
- Gladiolus cristatus Trew; Ixia flabellularis Vahl; Ixia squalida Thunb.; Ixia thunbergii Roem. & Schult.

Subspecies of plant

Tritonia securigera subsp. securigera is a perennial flowering plant belonging to the genus Tritonia. The species is endemic to the Eastern Cape and the Western Cape and currently has no threats.
