= Tritonia bakeri subsp. bakeri =

Scientific classification
- Kingdom: Plantae
- Clade: Tracheophytes
- Clade: Angiosperms
- Clade: Monocots
- Order: Asparagales
- Family: Iridaceae
- Genus: Tritonia
- Species: T. bakeri Klatt, 1894
- Subspecies: T. b. subsp. bakeri

Trinomial name
- Tritonia bakeri subsp. bakeri

Synonyms
- Gladiolus striatus Sol. ex Baker; Waitzia striata Heynh.

Subspecies of plant

Tritonia bakeri subsp. bakeri is a perennial flowering plant and geophyte belonging to the genus Tritonia and is part of the fynbos and renosterveld. The plant is endemic to the Eastern Cape and the Western Cape and occurs in the Klein Karoo, around Ladismith to Avontuur in the Langkloof. It currently has no threats.
