= Tritonia marlothii =

Scientific classification
- Kingdom: Plantae
- Clade: Tracheophytes
- Clade: Angiosperms
- Clade: Monocots
- Order: Asparagales
- Family: Iridaceae
- Genus: Tritonia
- Species: T. marlothii

Binomial name
- Tritonia marlothii M.P.de Vos, (1983)

Species of flowering plant

Tritonia marlothii is a perennial flowering plant belonging to the genus Tritonia. The species is endemic to the Northern Cape and occurs in the Richtersveld. The species grows on the lower slopes and plains and is threatened by overgrazing and trampling by animals.
