= Tritonia drakensbergensis =

Scientific classification
- Kingdom: Plantae
- Clade: Tracheophytes
- Clade: Angiosperms
- Clade: Monocots
- Order: Asparagales
- Family: Iridaceae
- Genus: Tritonia
- Species: T. drakensbergensis

Binomial name
- Tritonia drakensbergensis M.P.de Vos, (1983)

Species of flowering plant

Tritonia drakensbergensis is a tuberous geophyte belonging to the genus Tritonia. The species is endemic to the Eastern Cape.
