= Tritonia flabellifolia var. flabellifolia =

Scientific classification
- Kingdom: Plantae
- Clade: Tracheophytes
- Clade: Angiosperms
- Clade: Monocots
- Order: Asparagales
- Family: Iridaceae
- Genus: Tritonia
- Species: T. flabellifolia (D.Delaroche) G.J.Lewis, (1941)
- Variety: T. f. var. flabellifolia

Trinomial name
- Tritonia flabellifolia var. flabellifolia

Synonyms
- Freesea flava (Aiton) Eckl.; Montbretia flava (Aiton) Heynh.; Tritonia flava (Aiton) Ker Gawl.; Waitzia flava (Aiton) Kreysig

Variety of plant

Tritonia flabellifolia var. flabellifolia is a perennial flowering plant belonging to the genus Tritonia. The species is endemic to the Western Cape and currently has no threats.
