= Syringodea saxatilis =

Scientific classification
- Kingdom: Plantae
- Clade: Tracheophytes
- Clade: Angiosperms
- Clade: Monocots
- Order: Asparagales
- Family: Iridaceae
- Genus: Syringodea
- Species: S. saxatilis

Binomial name
- Syringodea saxatilis M.P.de Vos, (1974)

Species of flowering plant

Syringodea saxatilis is a perennial flowering plant and geophyte belonging to the genus Syringodea and is part of the renosterveld. The species is endemic to the Western Cape and occurs at Ladismith and the Anysberg. It has a range of 300 km^{2}. The subpopulation at Ladismith has less than 50 plants while the subpopulation at the foothills of the Anysberg is not threatened at all. The subpopulation at Ladismith is threatened by development.
