= Tritonia deusta subsp. deusta =

Scientific classification
- Kingdom: Plantae
- Clade: Tracheophytes
- Clade: Angiosperms
- Clade: Monocots
- Order: Asparagales
- Family: Iridaceae
- Genus: Tritonia
- Species: T. deusta (Aiton) Ker Gawl.
- Subspecies: T. d. subsp. deusta

Trinomial name
- Tritonia deusta subsp. deusta

Synonyms
- Tritonia coccinea Eckl.

Subspecies of plant

Tritonia deusta subsp. deusta is a perennial flowering plant belonging to the genus Tritonia and is part of the fynbos. The species is endemic to the Western Cape.
