= Syringodea concolor =

Scientific classification
- Kingdom: Plantae
- Clade: Tracheophytes
- Clade: Angiosperms
- Clade: Monocots
- Order: Asparagales
- Family: Iridaceae
- Genus: Syringodea
- Species: S. concolor

Binomial name
- Syringodea concolor (Baker) M.P.de Vos, (1974)

Synonyms
- Syringodea bicolor var. concolor Baker

Species of flowering plant

Syringodea concolor is a perennial flowering plant and geophyte belonging to the genus Syringodea. The species is endemic to the Northern Cape, Eastern Cape and Western Cape and occurs in the Great Karoo.
