= Tritonia pallida subsp. pallida =

Scientific classification
- Kingdom: Plantae
- Clade: Tracheophytes
- Clade: Angiosperms
- Clade: Monocots
- Order: Asparagales
- Family: Iridaceae
- Genus: Tritonia
- Species: T. pallida Ker Gawl. (Baker), 1810
- Subspecies: T. p. subsp. pallida

Trinomial name
- Tritonia pallida subsp. pallida

Subspecies of plant

Tritonia pallida subsp. pallida is a perennial flowering plant belonging to the genus Tritonia. The species is endemic to the Western Cape and currently has no threats.
