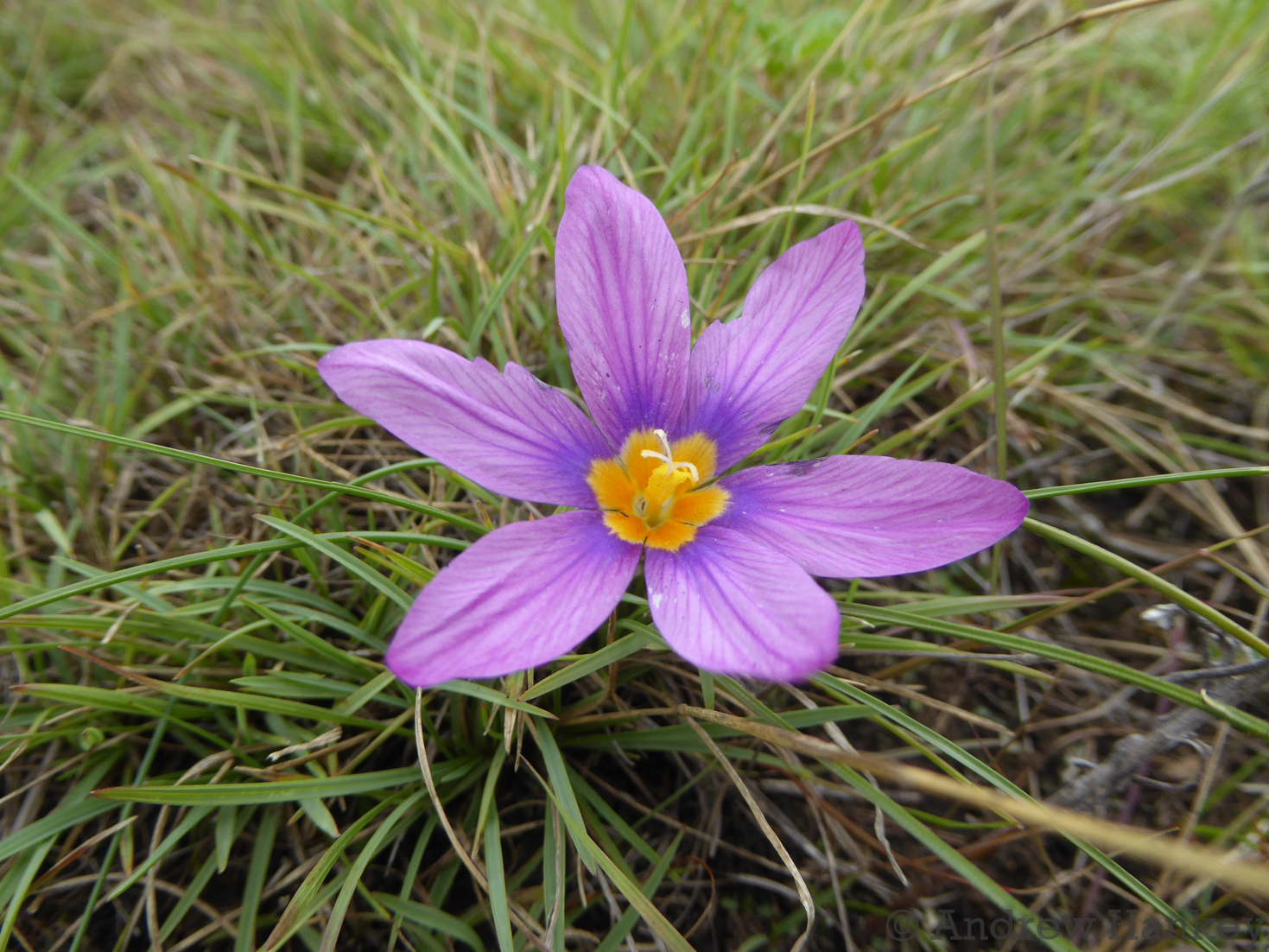

Scientific classification
- Kingdom: Plantae
- Clade: Tracheophytes
- Clade: Angiosperms
- Clade: Monocots
- Order: Asparagales
- Family: Iridaceae
- Genus: Syringodea
- Species: S. bifucata

Binomial name
- Syringodea bifucata M.P.de Vos, (1983)

= Syringodea bifucata =

Species of flowering plant

Syringodea bifucata is a perennial flowering plant and geophyte belonging to the genus Syringodea. The species is endemic to the Eastern Cape, Gauteng and the Free State.
