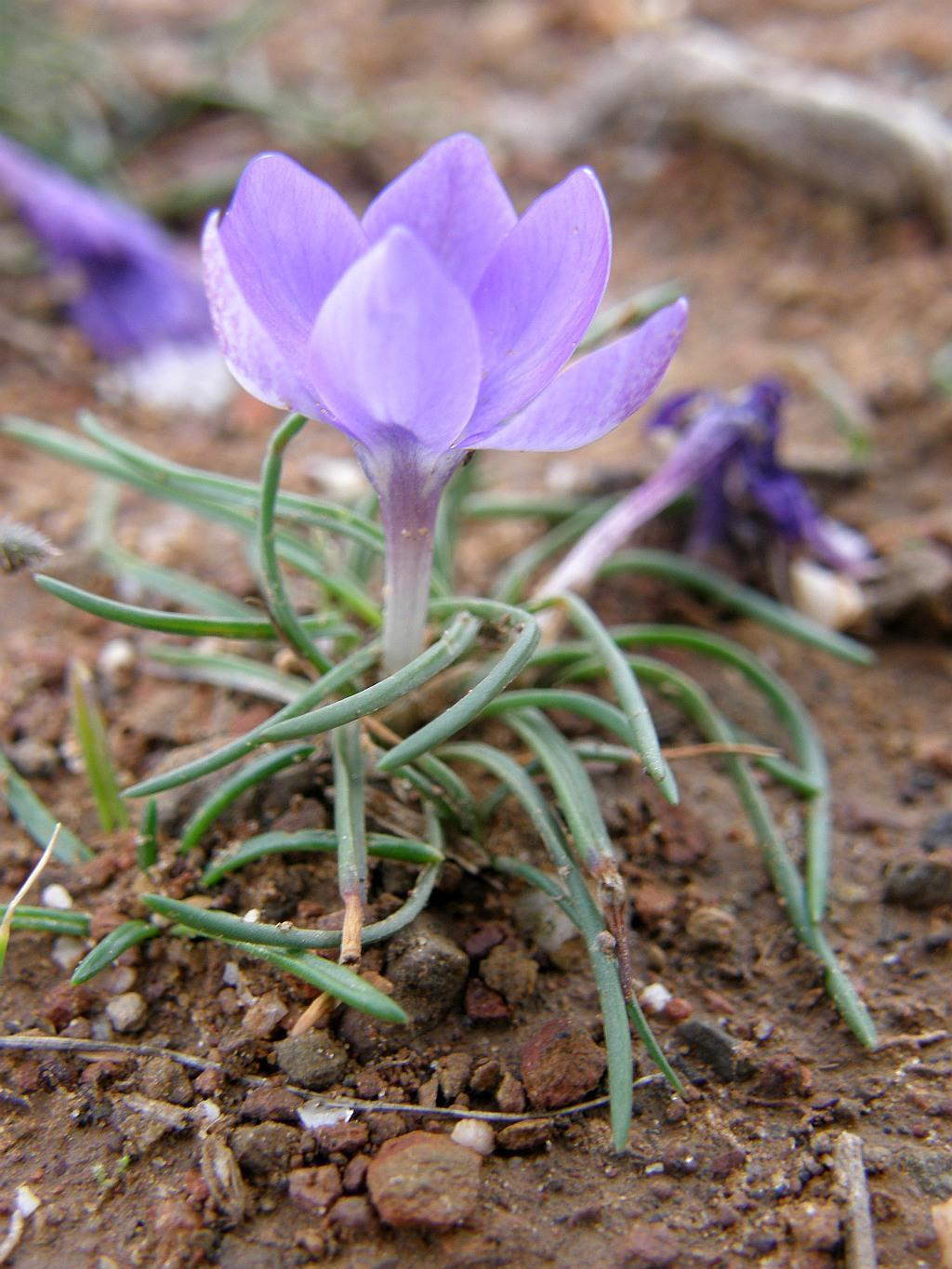
- Syringodea longituba

Scientific classification
- Kingdom: Plantae
- Clade: Tracheophytes
- Clade: Angiosperms
- Clade: Monocots
- Order: Asparagales
- Family: Iridaceae
- Subfamily: Crocoideae
- Tribe: Croceae
- Genus: Syringodea; Hook.f.

Type species
- Syringodea pulchella Hook.f.

= Syringodea =

Genus of flowering plants

Syringodea is a genus of flowering plants in the family Iridaceae, first described as a genus in 1873. The entire genus is endemic to South Africa.

The genus name is derived from the Greek word syrinx, meaning "pipe", and alludes to the long perianth tube.

== Species ==
Six species are accepted.

- Syringodea bifucata M.P.de Vos - Eastern Cape, Free State, Gauteng
- Syringodea concolor (Baker) M.P.de Vos - Eastern Cape, Northern Cape, Western Cape
- Syringodea derustensis M.P.de Vos - Western Cape
- Syringodea flanaganii Baker - Eastern Cape
- Syringodea longituba (Klatt) Kuntze - Western Cape
- Syringodea pulchella Hook.f. (unplaced) - Eastern Cape
- Syringodea saxatilis M.P.de Vos - Western Cape

=== Formerly placed here ===
- Afrocrocus unifolius (Goldblatt) Goldblatt & J.C.Manning (as Syringodea unifolia Goldblatt)
