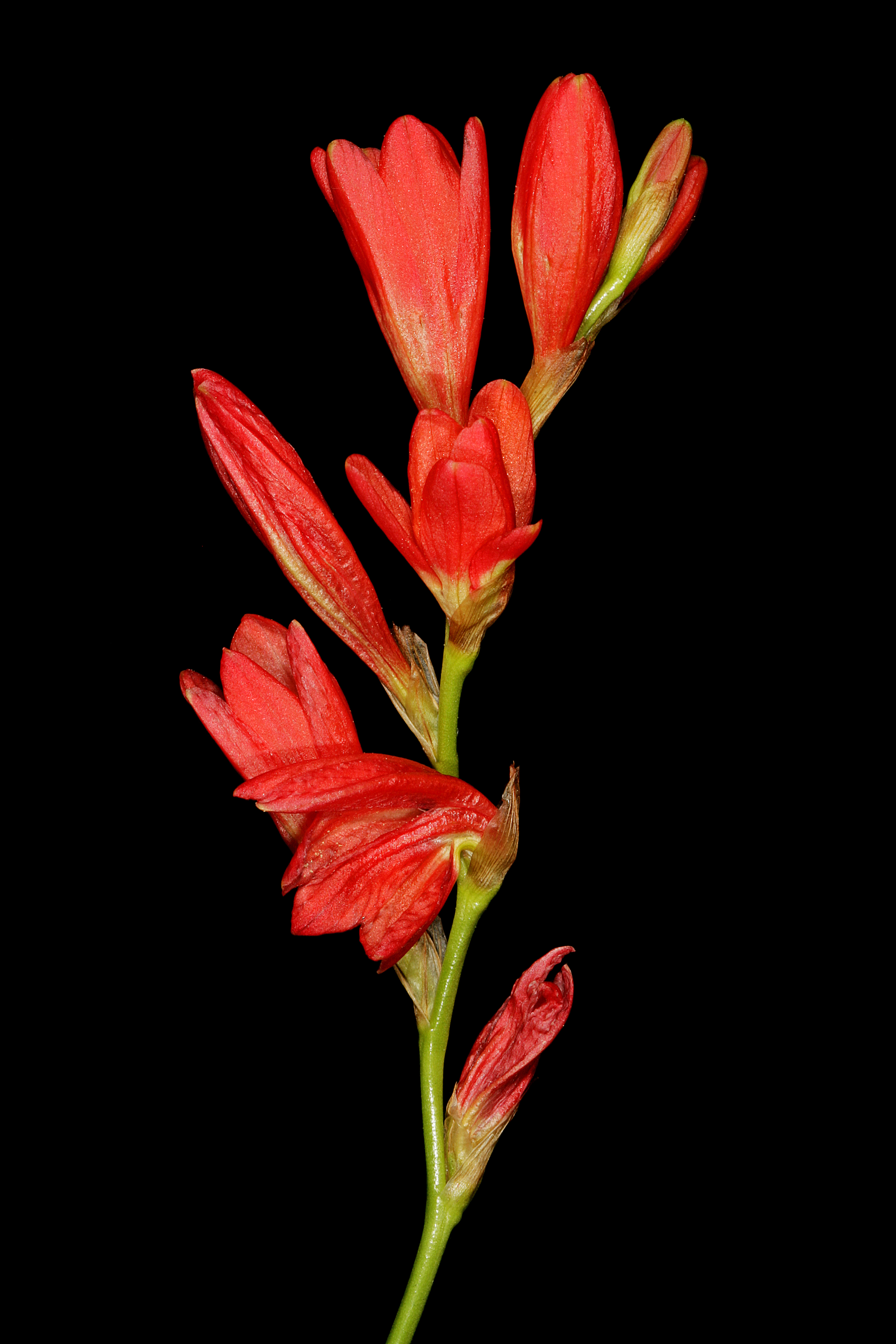

Scientific classification
- Kingdom: Plantae
- Clade: Tracheophytes
- Clade: Angiosperms
- Clade: Monocots
- Order: Asparagales
- Family: Iridaceae
- Genus: Tritonia
- Species: T. disticha (Klatt) Baker
- Subspecies: T. d. subsp. disticha

Trinomial name
- Tritonia disticha subsp. disticha

Synonyms
- Tritonia coccinea L.Bolus

= Tritonia disticha subsp. disticha =

Subspecies of plant

Tritonia disticha subsp. disticha is a perennial flowering plant belonging to the genus Tritonia. The species is endemic to KwaZulu-Natal and the Eastern Cape.
