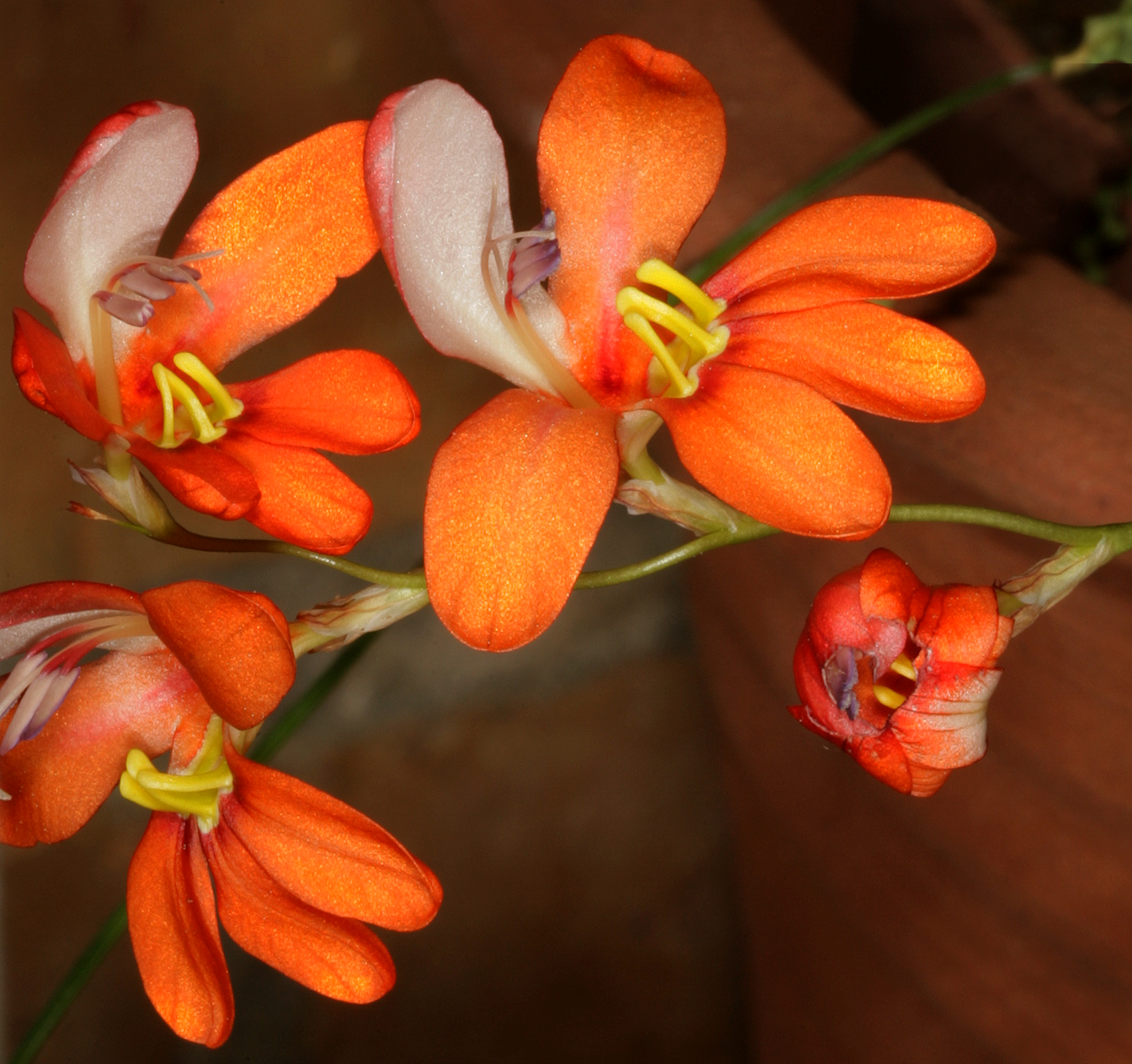

Scientific classification
- Kingdom: Plantae
- Clade: Tracheophytes
- Clade: Angiosperms
- Clade: Monocots
- Order: Asparagales
- Family: Iridaceae
- Genus: Tritonia
- Species: T. securigera

Binomial name
- Tritonia securigera (Aiton) Ker Gawl., 1804

Synonyms
- Tritonia securiger Aiton

= Tritonia securigera =

Species of flowering plant

Tritonia securigera is a plant species in the family Iridaceae.

== Subspecies ==
There are two subspecies recognized under T. securigera.

- Tritonia securigera subsp. securigera
- Tritonia securigera subsp. watermeyeri
