= Tritonia delpierrei =

Scientific classification
- Kingdom: Plantae
- Clade: Tracheophytes
- Clade: Angiosperms
- Clade: Monocots
- Order: Asparagales
- Family: Iridaceae
- Genus: Tritonia
- Species: T. delpierrei

Binomial name
- Tritonia delpierrei M.P.de Vos, (1983)

Synonyms
- Tritonia marlothii subsp. delpierrei (M.P.de Vos) M.P.de Vos

Species of flowering plant

Tritonia delpierrei is a tuberous geophyte belonging to the Tritonia. The species is endemic to the Northern Cape and occurs in the Richtersveld where it is part of the vygieveld. It has an area of occurrence of 157 km². The species is threatened by overgrazing and trampling by livestock.
