= Tritonia atrorubens =

Scientific classification
- Kingdom: Plantae
- Clade: Tracheophytes
- Clade: Angiosperms
- Clade: Monocots
- Order: Asparagales
- Family: Iridaceae
- Genus: Tritonia
- Species: T. atrorubens

Binomial name
- Tritonia atrorubens (N.E.Br.) L.Bolus, (1927)

Synonyms
- Gladiolus atrorubens N.E.Br.; Tritonia flanaganii L.Bolus

Species of flowering plant

Tritonia atrorubens is a tuberous geophyte belonging to the genus Tritonia. The species is endemic to the Eastern Cape and occurs from Komga to the Groot Kei River estuary. The plant is part of the grassland and was last seen in 1903.
