= Tritonia lancea =

Scientific classification
- Kingdom: Plantae
- Clade: Tracheophytes
- Clade: Angiosperms
- Clade: Monocots
- Order: Asparagales
- Family: Iridaceae
- Genus: Tritonia
- Species: T. lancea

Binomial name
- Tritonia lancea (Thunb.) N.E.Br., (1928)

Synonyms
- Ixia lancea Thunb.; Ixia pectinata Vahl; Montbretia lacerata var. pectinata (Vahl) Baker; Montbretia pectinata (Vahl) Heynh.; Tritonia crispa var. pectinata (Vahl) Baker; Tritonia pectinata (Vahl) Ker Gawl.; Waitzia pectinata (Vahl) Heynh.

Species of flowering plant

Tritonia lancea is a perennial flowering plant belonging to the genus Tritonia. The species is endemic to the Western Cape and is part of the fynbos and renosterveld. The species has an area of occurrence of less than 92 km^{2} and occurs on the Piketberg.
