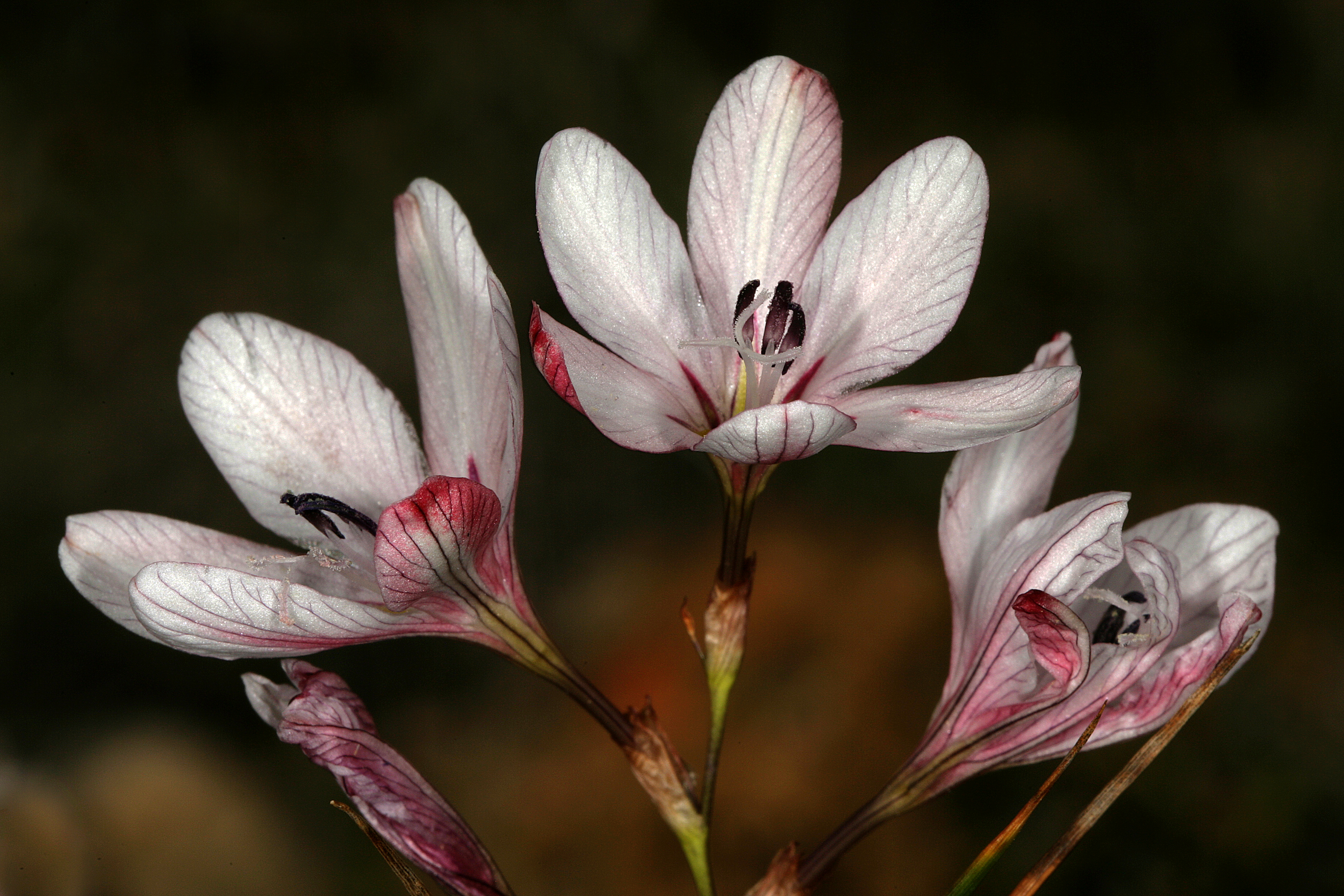

Scientific classification
- Kingdom: Plantae
- Clade: Tracheophytes
- Clade: Angiosperms
- Clade: Monocots
- Order: Asparagales
- Family: Iridaceae
- Genus: Tritonia
- Species: T. bakeri

Binomial name
- Tritonia bakeri Klatt, 1894

= Tritonia bakeri =

Species of flowering plant

Tritonia bakeri is a plant species in the family Iridaceae. It includes two species native to the southern Cape Provinces of South Africa.

== Subspecies ==
There are two subspecies recognized under T. bakeri.

- Tritonia bakeri subsp. bakeri
- Tritonia bakeri subsp. lilacina
