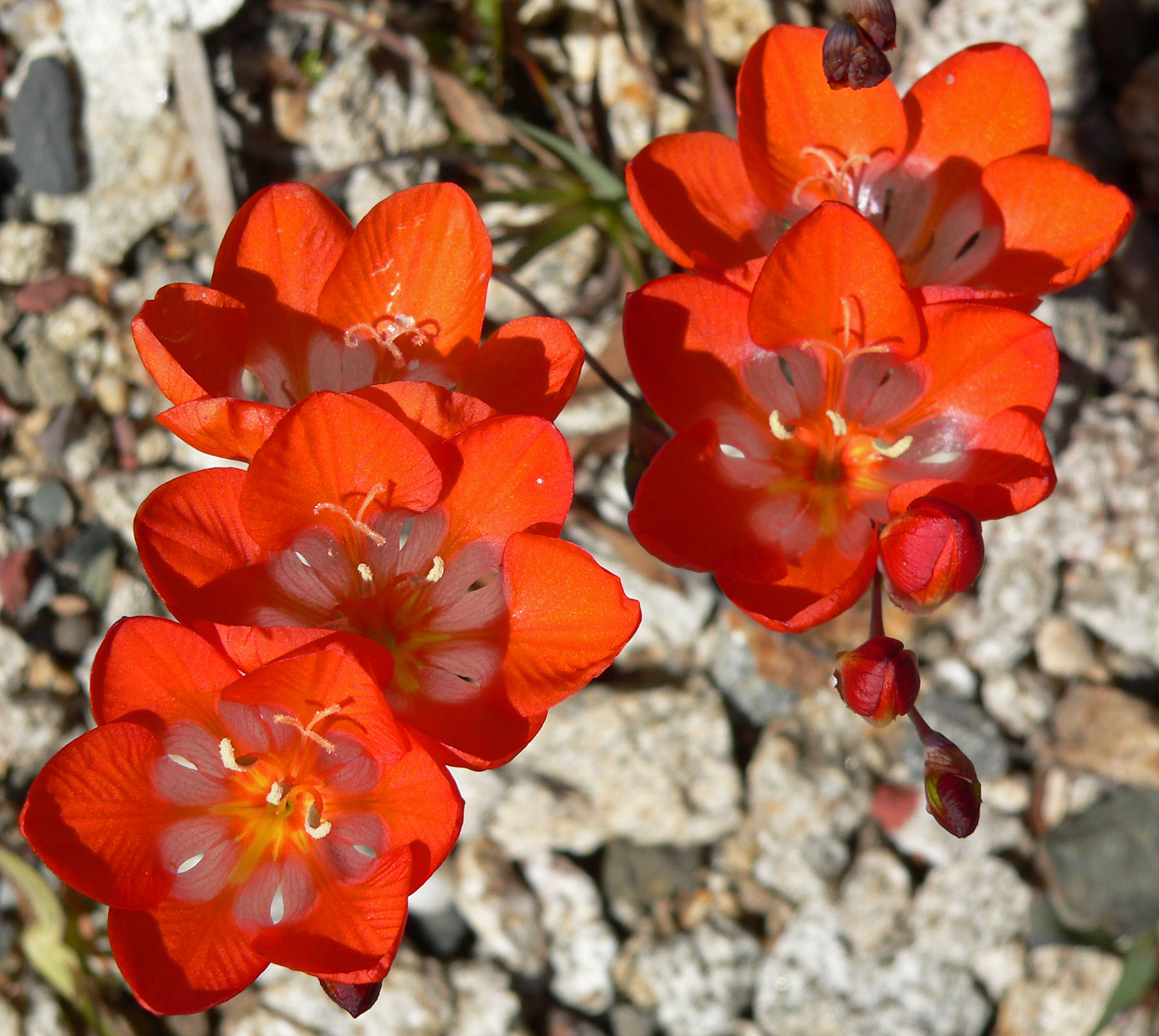

Scientific classification
- Kingdom: Plantae
- Clade: Tracheophytes
- Clade: Angiosperms
- Clade: Monocots
- Order: Asparagales
- Family: Iridaceae
- Genus: Tritonia
- Species: T. crocata

Binomial name
- Tritonia crocata (L.) Ker Gawl.

Synonyms
- Belamcanda fenestrata (Jacq.) Moench; Crocosmia crocata (L.) Planch.; Crocosmia fenestrata (Jacq.) Planch.; Freesea mineatolateritia Eckl.; Gladiolus crocatus (L.) Pers.; Ixia crocata L.; Ixia crocata Thunb.; Ixia fenestrata Jacq.; Ixia hyalina L.f.; Ixia hyalina Salisb. nom. illeg.; Ixia iridifolia D.Delaroche; Ixia planifolia Mill. nom. inval.; Ixia purpurea Lam. nom. illeg.; Montbretia crocata (L.) Endl.; Montbretia fenestrata (Jacq.) Endl.; Montbretia purpurea (Ker Gawl.) Heynh.; Montbretia sanguinea Heynh.; Tritonia fenestrata (Jacq.) Ker Gawl.; Tritonia hyalina (L.f.) Baker; Tritonia purpurea Ker Gawl.; Tritonia sanguinea Eckl.; Tritonixia crocata (L.) Klatt; Tritonixia hyalina (L.f.) Klatt; Tritonixia purpurea (Ker Gawl.) Klatt; Waitzia crocata (L.) Hoffm.; Waitzia fenestrata (Jacq.) Kreysig

= Tritonia crocata =

Species of flowering plant

Tritonia crocata is a plant species in the family Iridaceae.
