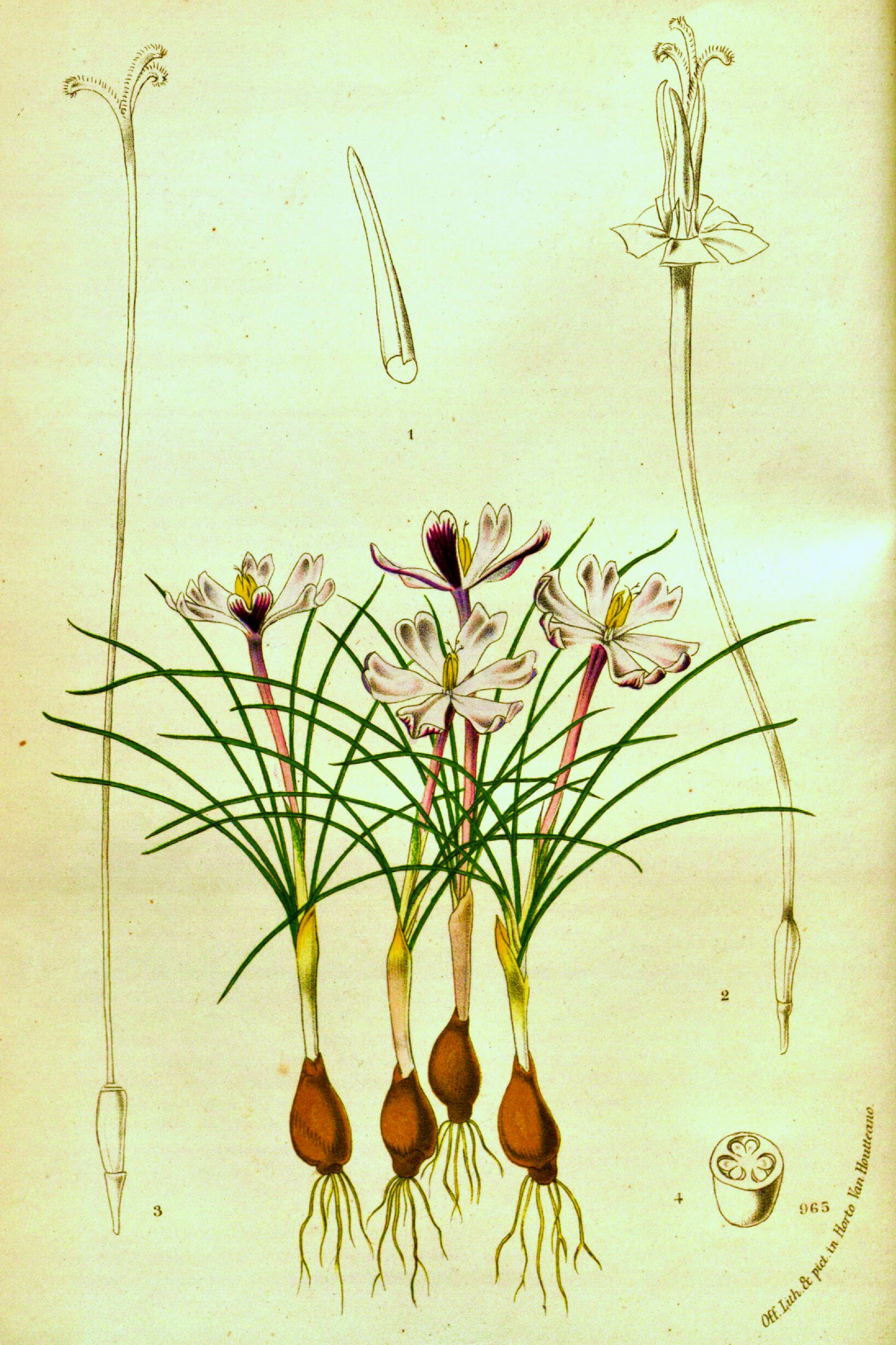

Scientific classification
- Kingdom: Plantae
- Clade: Tracheophytes
- Clade: Angiosperms
- Clade: Monocots
- Order: Asparagales
- Family: Iridaceae
- Genus: Syringodea
- Species: S. pulchella

Binomial name
- Syringodea pulchella Hook.f., (1873)

= Syringodea pulchella =

Species of flowering plant

Syringodea pulchella is a perennial flowering plant and geophyte belonging to the genus Syringodea. The species is endemic to the Eastern Cape and occurs in the Sneeuberge. It has a range of less than 50 km^{2}, with only one population. The plant has lost habitat to road construction, and this and overgrazing are potential threats.
