= Tritonia parvula =

Scientific classification
- Kingdom: Plantae
- Clade: Tracheophytes
- Clade: Angiosperms
- Clade: Monocots
- Order: Asparagales
- Family: Iridaceae
- Genus: Tritonia
- Species: T. parvula

Binomial name
- Tritonia parvula N.E.Br., (1931)

Species of flowering plant

Tritonia parvula is a tuberous geophyte belonging to the genus Tritonia. The species is endemic to the Eastern Cape and Western Cape.
