= Tritonia linearifolia =

Scientific classification
- Kingdom: Plantae
- Clade: Tracheophytes
- Clade: Angiosperms
- Clade: Monocots
- Order: Asparagales
- Family: Iridaceae
- Genus: Tritonia
- Species: T. linearifolia

Binomial name
- Tritonia linearifolia Goldblatt & J.C.Manning, (2011)

Species of flowering plant

Tritonia linearifolia is a species of flowering plant in the family Iridaceae. It is a perennial geophyte and is part of the fynbos ecoregion. The species is endemic to the Eastern Cape and Western Cape and occurs in the Outeniqua, Kouga and Baviaanskloof Mountains. It grows on the southern slopes.
