= Tritonia cooperi =

Scientific classification
- Kingdom: Plantae
- Clade: Tracheophytes
- Clade: Angiosperms
- Clade: Monocots
- Order: Asparagales
- Family: Iridaceae
- Genus: Tritonia
- Species: T. cooperi

Binomial name
- Tritonia cooperi (Baker) Klatt, (1982)

Synonyms
- Crocosmia longiflora (L.f.) Klatt; Gladiolus longiflorus L.f.; Ixia cooperi (Baker) Baker; Montbretia longiflora (L.f.) Voigt; Morphixia cooperi Baker; Tapeinia longiflora (L.f.) F.Dietr.; Tritonia cooperi subsp. quadrialata M.P.de Vos; Tritonia longiflora (L.f.) N.E.Br.; Tritonia longituba R.C.Foster; Waitzia longiflora (L.f.) Kreysig

Species of flowering plant

Tritonia cooperi is a tuberous geophyte that is part of the genus Tritonia. The species is endemic to the Western Cape. It occurs from the Du Toitskloof Mountains to the Kogelberg and eastwards across the Riviersonderend Mountains and Langeberg to Riversdale and the Potberg. The species has a range of 15 773 km² and is part of the fynbos.
