= Tritonia kamisbergensis =

Scientific classification
- Kingdom: Plantae
- Clade: Tracheophytes
- Clade: Angiosperms
- Clade: Monocots
- Order: Asparagales
- Family: Iridaceae
- Genus: Tritonia
- Species: T. kamisbergensis

Binomial name
- Tritonia kamisbergensis Klatt, (1864)

Synonyms
- Montbretia kamisbergensis (Klatt) Baker; Tritonixia kamisbergensis (Klatt) Klatt

Species of flowering plant

Tritonia kamisbergensis is a perennial flowering plant and geophyte belonging to the genus Tritonia and is part of the fynbos and the Succulent Karoo. The plant is endemic to the Northern Cape and occurs in Namaqualand and Kamiesberge. Here the species has a range of 391 km² and there are three subpopulations. The plant is considered rare.
