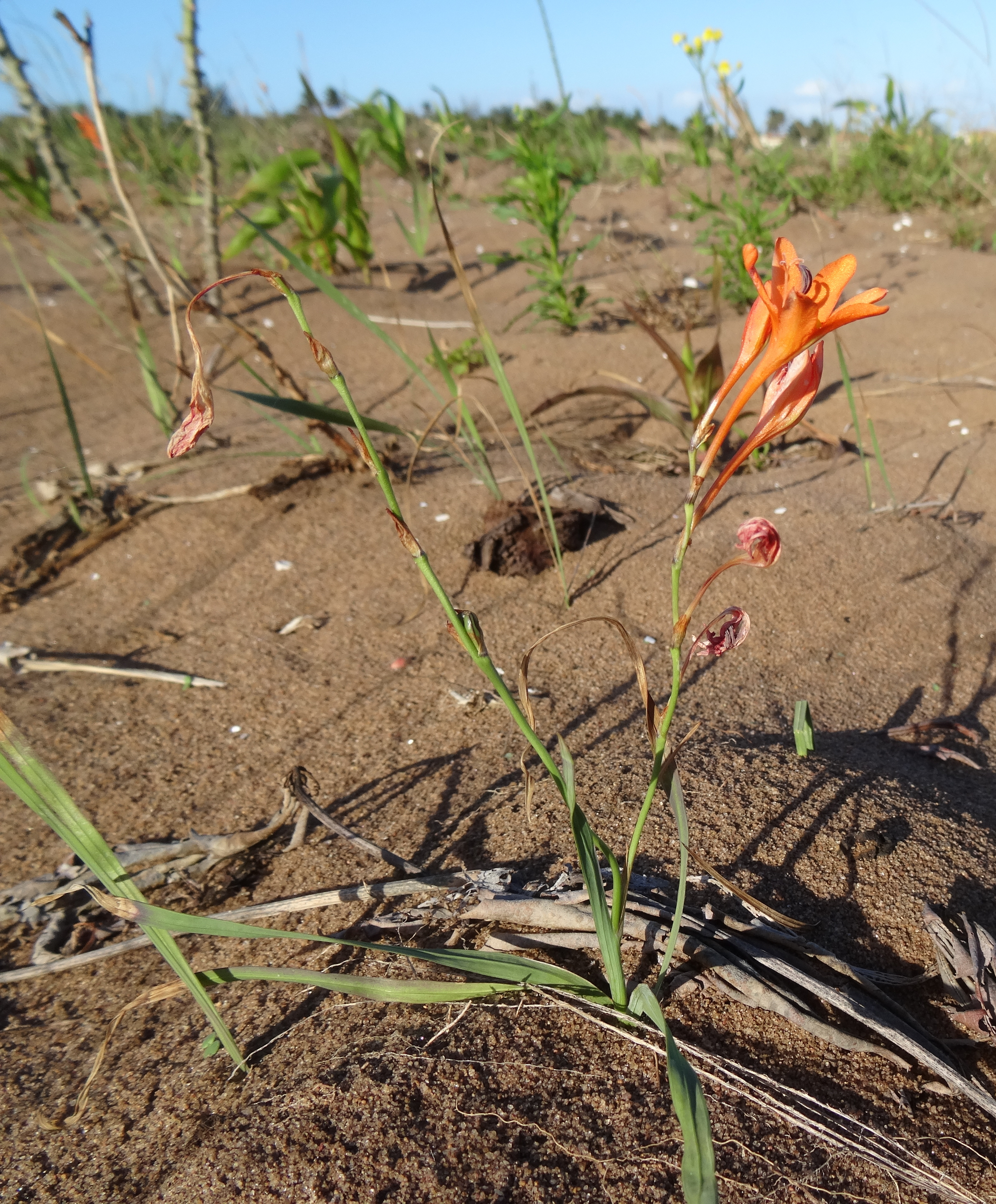

Conservation status
- Least Concern (IUCN 3.1)

Scientific classification
- Kingdom: Plantae
- Clade: Tracheophytes
- Clade: Angiosperms
- Clade: Monocots
- Order: Asparagales
- Family: Iridaceae
- Genus: Tritonia
- Species: T. moggii

Binomial name
- Tritonia moggii Oberm., (1963)

= Tritonia moggii =

Species of flowering plant

Tritonia moggii is a perennial flowering plant belonging to the genus Tritonia. The species is endemic to Mozambique, where it occurs in the south.
