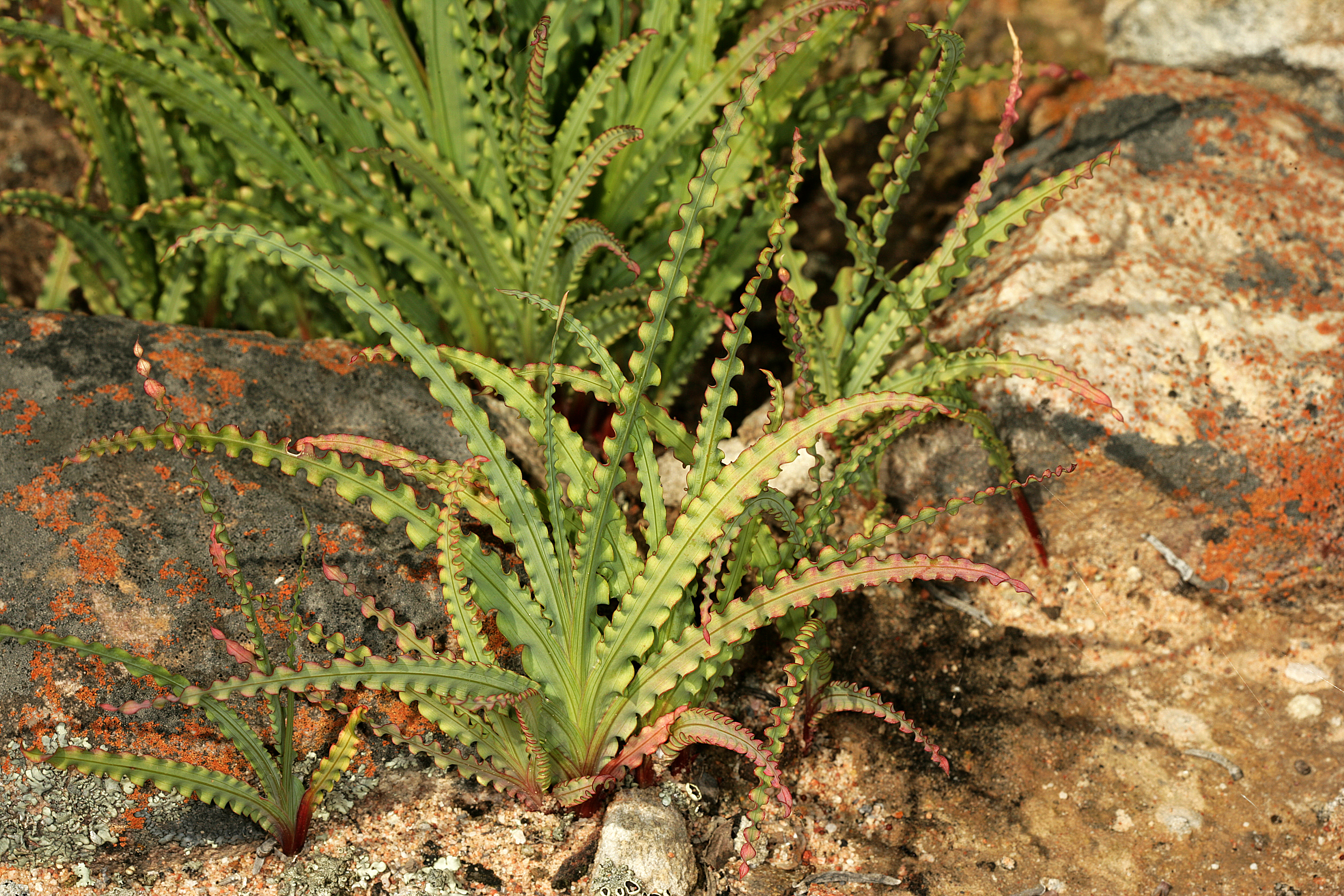

Scientific classification
- Kingdom: Plantae
- Clade: Tracheophytes
- Clade: Angiosperms
- Clade: Monocots
- Order: Asparagales
- Family: Iridaceae
- Genus: Tritonia
- Species: T. undulata

Binomial name
- Tritonia undulata (Burm.f.) Baker, (1877)

Synonyms
- Acidanthera crispa (L.f.) Pax; Dichone crispa (L.f.) C.Lawson; Freesea crispa (L.f.) Eckl.; Gladiolus crispus L.f.; Gladiolus pectinatus Sol. ex Baker; Ixia crispa L.f.; Ixia undulata Burm.f.; Montbretia crispa (L.f.) Voigt; Tapeinia crispa (L.f.) F.Dietr.; Tritonia crispa (L.f.) Ker Gawl.; Tritonia crispa var. grandiflora Baker; Tritonia crispa var. parviflora Baker; Tritonixia undulata (Burm.f.) Klatt; Waitzia crispa (L.f.) Kreysig

= Tritonia undulata (plant) =

Species of flowering plant

Tritonia undulata is a tuberous geophyte that is part of the genus Tritonia. The species is endemic to the Eastern Cape and Western Cape. The species has a range of 34 745 km² and is part of the fynbos.
