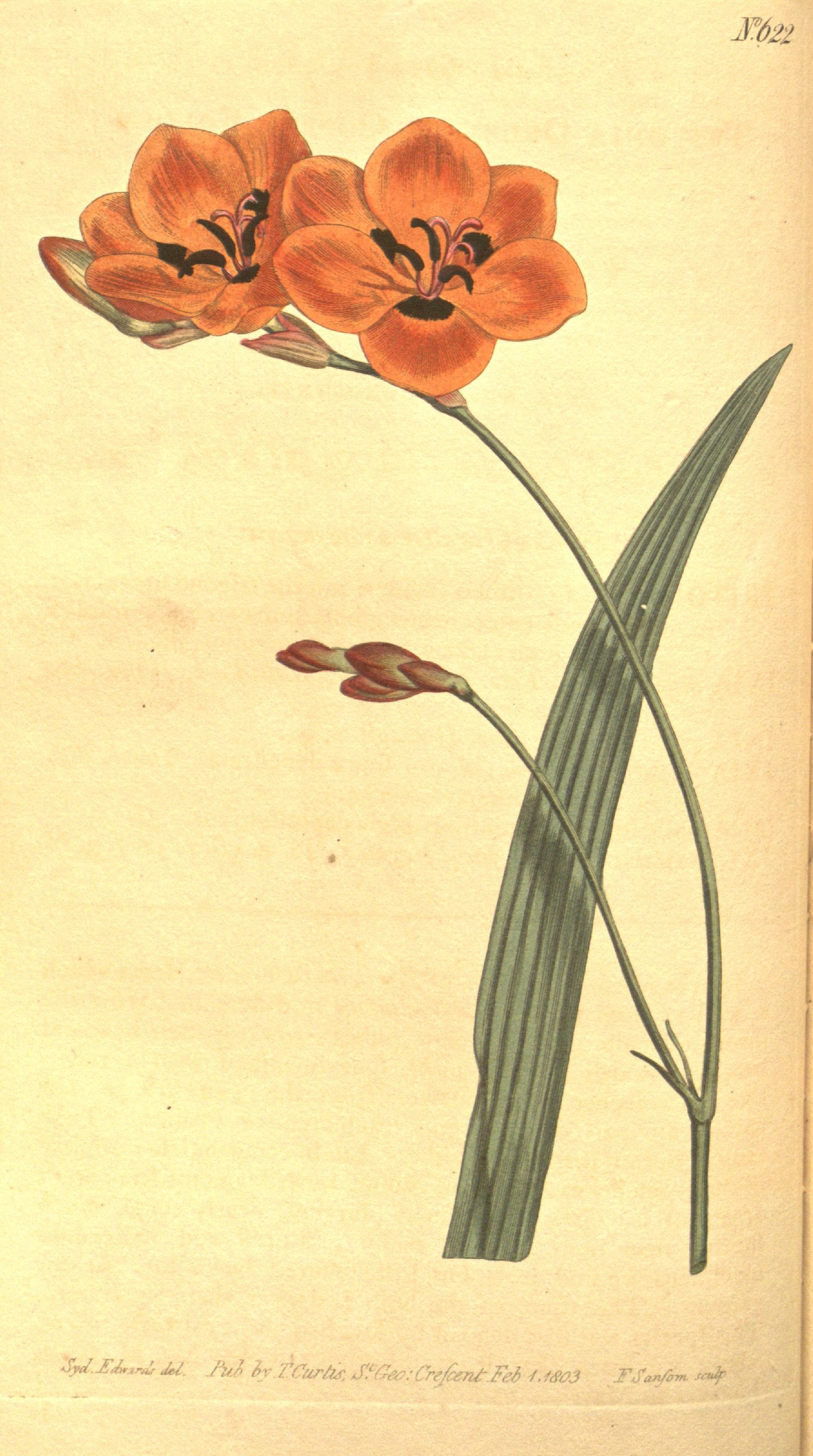

Scientific classification
- Kingdom: Plantae
- Clade: Tracheophytes
- Clade: Angiosperms
- Clade: Monocots
- Order: Asparagales
- Family: Iridaceae
- Genus: Tritonia
- Species: T. deusta

Binomial name
- Tritonia deusta (Ait.) Ker Gawl.

= Tritonia deusta =

Species of flowering plant

Tritonia deusta is a plant species in the family Iridaceae, indigenous to the Western Cape Province, South Africa.

== Subspecies ==
There are two subspecies recognized under T. deusta.

- Tritonia deusta subsp. deusta
- Tritonia deusta subsp. miniata
