= Tritonia chrysantha =

Scientific classification
- Kingdom: Plantae
- Clade: Tracheophytes
- Clade: Angiosperms
- Clade: Monocots
- Order: Asparagales
- Family: Iridaceae
- Genus: Tritonia
- Species: T. chrysantha

Binomial name
- Tritonia chrysantha Fourc., (1932)

Species of flowering plant

Tritonia chrysantha is a tuberous geophyte that is part of the Tritonia. The plant is endemic to the Eastern Cape and Western Cape and is part of the fynbos.
