= Tritonia laxifolia =

Scientific classification
- Kingdom: Plantae
- Clade: Tracheophytes
- Clade: Angiosperms
- Clade: Monocots
- Order: Asparagales
- Family: Iridaceae
- Genus: Tritonia
- Species: T. laxifolia

Binomial name
- Tritonia laxifolia (Klatt) Benth. ex Baker, (1892)

Synonyms
- Montbretia laxifolia Klatt; Tritonia bakeri Klatt; Tritonia bracteata Worsley; Tritonia clusiana Worsley

Species of flowering plant

Tritonia laxifolia is a perennial flowering plant belonging to the genus Tritonia. In South Africa, the species is endemic to the Eastern Cape and KwaZulu-Natal as well as Malawi, Mozambique, Tanzania and Zambia.
