= Syringodea flanaganii =

Scientific classification
- Kingdom: Plantae
- Clade: Tracheophytes
- Clade: Angiosperms
- Clade: Monocots
- Order: Asparagales
- Family: Iridaceae
- Genus: Syringodea
- Species: S. flanaganii

Binomial name
- Syringodea flanaganii Baker, (1893)

Species of flowering plant

Syringodea flanaganii is a perennial flowering plant and geophyte belonging to the genus Syringodea. The species is endemic to the Eastern Cape and occurs from Port Elizabeth to Komga and also at Cathcart. The plant is possibly extinct around Port Elizabeth, having last been seen there in 1933. It is threatened by overgrazing in the Stutterheim-Cathcart area.
