= Tritonia cedarmontana =

Scientific classification
- Kingdom: Plantae
- Clade: Tracheophytes
- Clade: Angiosperms
- Clade: Monocots
- Order: Asparagales
- Family: Iridaceae
- Genus: Tritonia
- Species: T. cedarmontana

Binomial name
- Tritonia cedarmontana Goldblatt & J.C.Manning, (2011)

Species of flowering plant

Tritonia cedarmontana is a species of flowering plant in the family Iridaceae. It is a perennial geophyte and is part of the fynbos ecoregion. The species is endemic to the Western Cape and occurs on the southern Cederberg. Here the species has a range of less than 20 km² and the single population occurs in a gorge where it grows on the slopes.
