= Tritonia florentiae =

Scientific classification
- Kingdom: Plantae
- Clade: Tracheophytes
- Clade: Angiosperms
- Clade: Monocots
- Order: Asparagales
- Family: Iridaceae
- Genus: Tritonia
- Species: T. florentiae

Binomial name
- Tritonia florentiae (Marloth) Goldblatt, (1974)

Synonyms
- Homotypic Synonyms: Gladiolus florentiae Marloth; Montbretiopsis florentiae (Marloth) L.Bolus

Species of flowering plant

Tritonia florentiae is a species of flowering plant in the family Iridaceae. It is a rare, tuberous, geophyte that is endemic to the Northern Cape and Western Cape and occurs from the Roggeveld to Prince Albert and Beaufort West. The plant is part of the Succulent Karoo and Nama Karoo.
