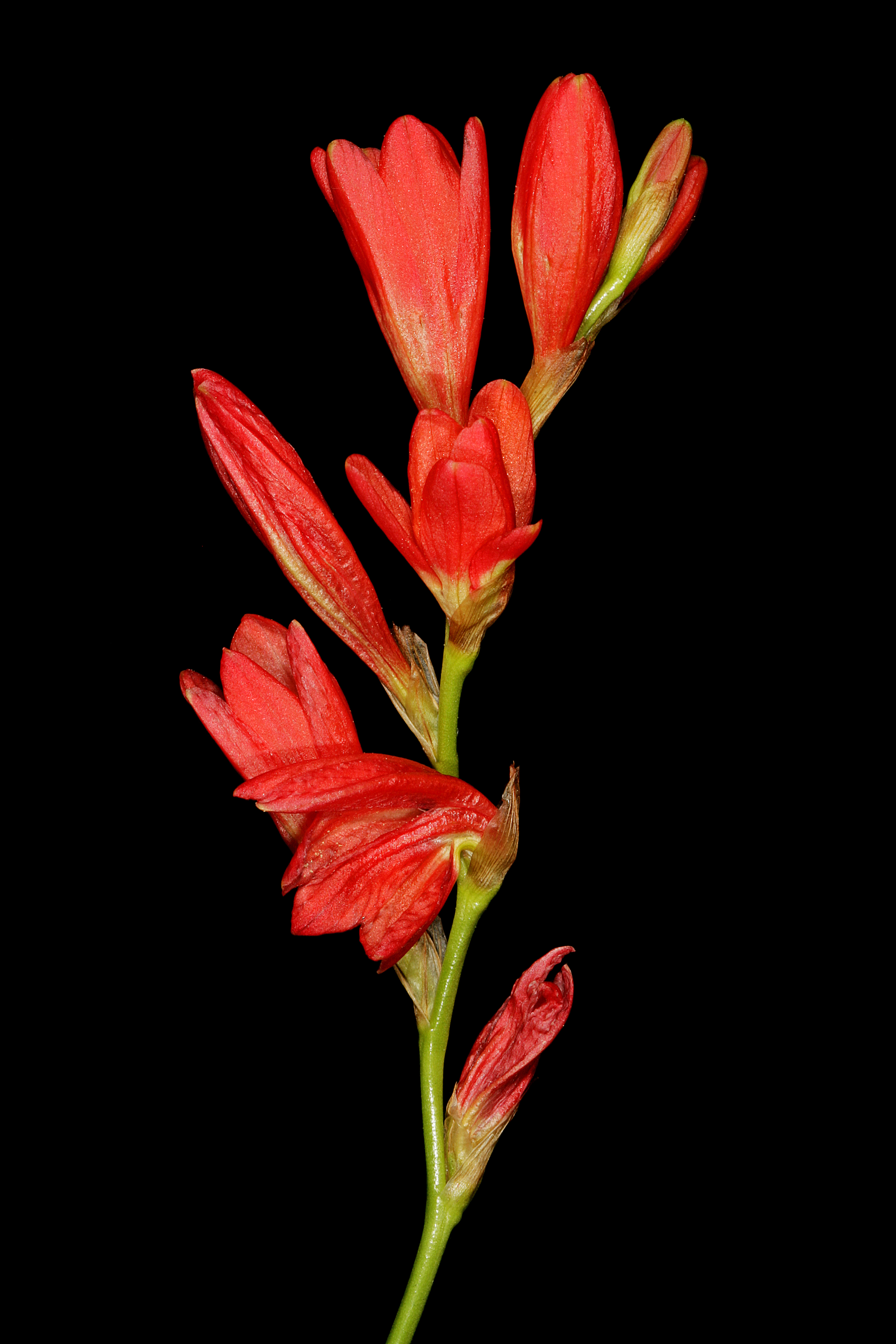

Scientific classification
- Kingdom: Plantae
- Clade: Tracheophytes
- Clade: Angiosperms
- Clade: Monocots
- Order: Asparagales
- Family: Iridaceae
- Genus: Tritonia
- Species: T. disticha

Binomial name
- Tritonia disticha (Klatt) Baker, 1892

= Tritonia disticha =

Species of flowering plant

Tritonia disticha is a plant species in the family Iridaceae.

== Subspecies ==
There are two subspecies recognized under T. disticha.

- Tritonia disticha subsp. disticha
- Tritonia disticha subsp. rubrolucens
