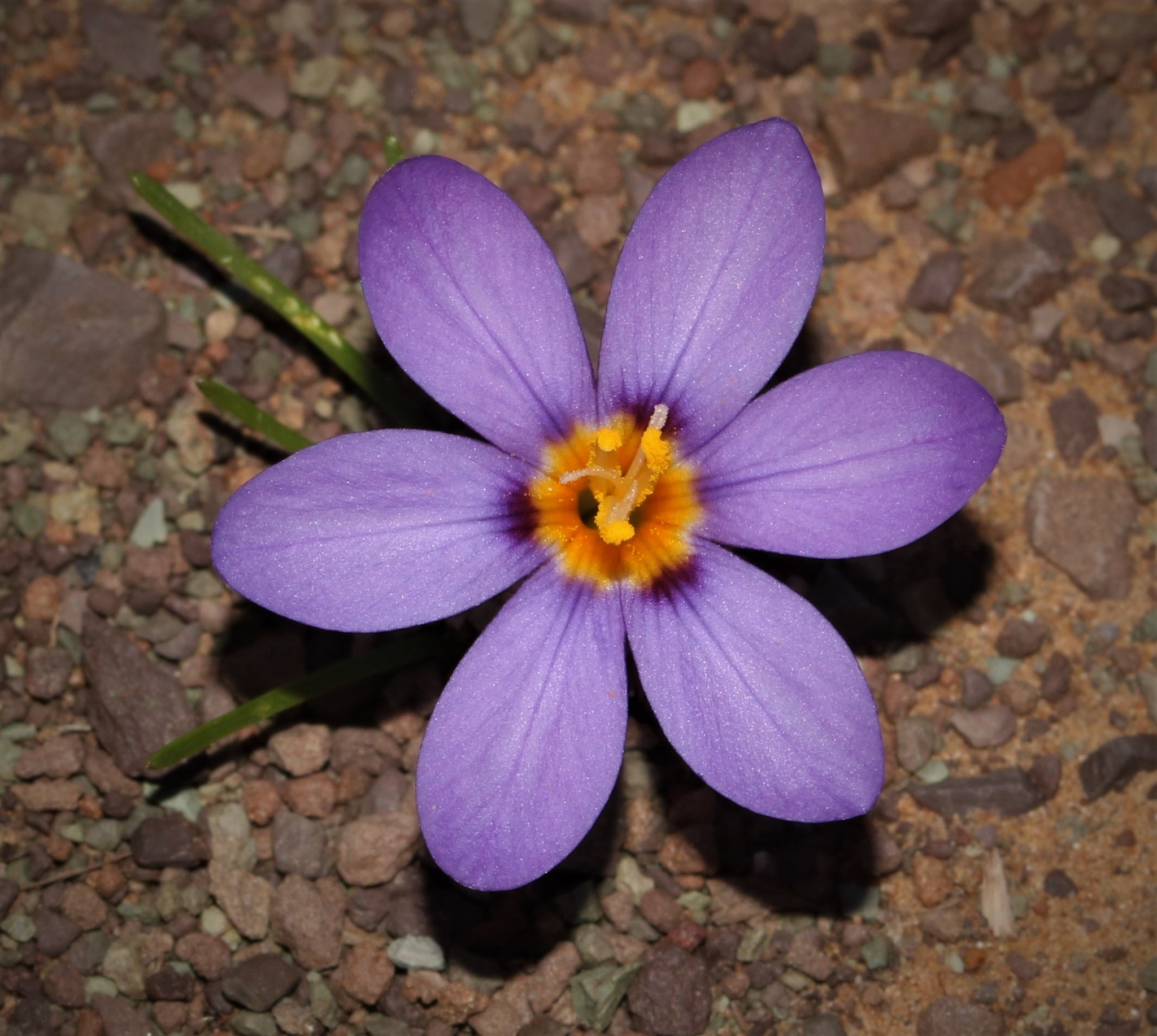

Scientific classification
- Kingdom: Plantae
- Clade: Tracheophytes
- Clade: Angiosperms
- Clade: Monocots
- Order: Asparagales
- Family: Iridaceae
- Genus: Syringodea
- Species: S. longituba

Binomial name
- Syringodea longituba (Klatt) Kuntze, (1898)

Synonyms
- Syringodea bicolor Baker; Trichonema longitubum Klatt

= Syringodea longituba =

Species of flowering plant

Syringodea longituba is a perennial flowering plant and geophyte belonging to the genus Syringodea and is part of the fynbos and Succulent Karoo. The species is endemic to the Northern Cape and the Western Cape. The plant occurs from the Bokkeveldberge and Hantam Karoo southwards to Malmesbury and Riversdale. The plant is threatened by crop cultivation on the Roggevelde Scarp and lowlands in the Western Cape.
