= Tritonia flabellifolia =

Scientific classification
- Kingdom: Plantae
- Clade: Tracheophytes
- Clade: Angiosperms
- Clade: Monocots
- Order: Asparagales
- Family: Iridaceae
- Genus: Tritonia
- Species: T. flabellifolia

Binomial name
- Tritonia flabellifolia (D.Delaroche) G.J.Lewis, 1941

Species of flowering plant

Tritonia flabellifolia is a plant species in the family Iridaceae.

== Varieties ==
There are three varieties recognized under T. flabellifolia.

- Tritonia flabellifolia var. flabellifolia
- Tritonia flabellifolia var. major
- Tritonia flabellifolia var. thomasiae
