= Tritonia tugwelliae =

Scientific classification
- Kingdom: Plantae
- Clade: Tracheophytes
- Clade: Angiosperms
- Clade: Monocots
- Order: Asparagales
- Family: Iridaceae
- Genus: Tritonia
- Species: T. tugwelliae

Binomial name
- Tritonia tugwelliae L.Bolus, (1926)

Species of flowering plant

Tritonia tugwelliae is a tuberous geophyte that is part of the genus Tritonia. The species is endemic to the Western Cape and occurs between Prince Albert, Leeu-Gamka and Laingsburg. The species currently has no threats.
