= Tritonia dubia =

Scientific classification
- Kingdom: Plantae
- Clade: Tracheophytes
- Clade: Angiosperms
- Clade: Monocots
- Order: Asparagales
- Family: Iridaceae
- Genus: Tritonia
- Species: T. dubia

Binomial name
- Tritonia dubia Eckl. ex Klatt, (1864)

Synonyms
- Montbretia dubia (Eckl. ex Klatt) Baker; Tritonia bolusii Baker; Tritonixia bolusii (Baker) Klatt; Tritonixia dubia (Eckl. ex Klatt) Klatt

Species of flowering plant

Tritonia dubia is a tuberous geophyte that is part of the genus Tritonia. The species is endemic to the Eastern Cape and occurs from Humansdorp to Port Elizabeth. The species has lost 50% of its habitat in the past 150 years due to crop cultivation and urban development. Invasive plants are also now becoming a threat.
