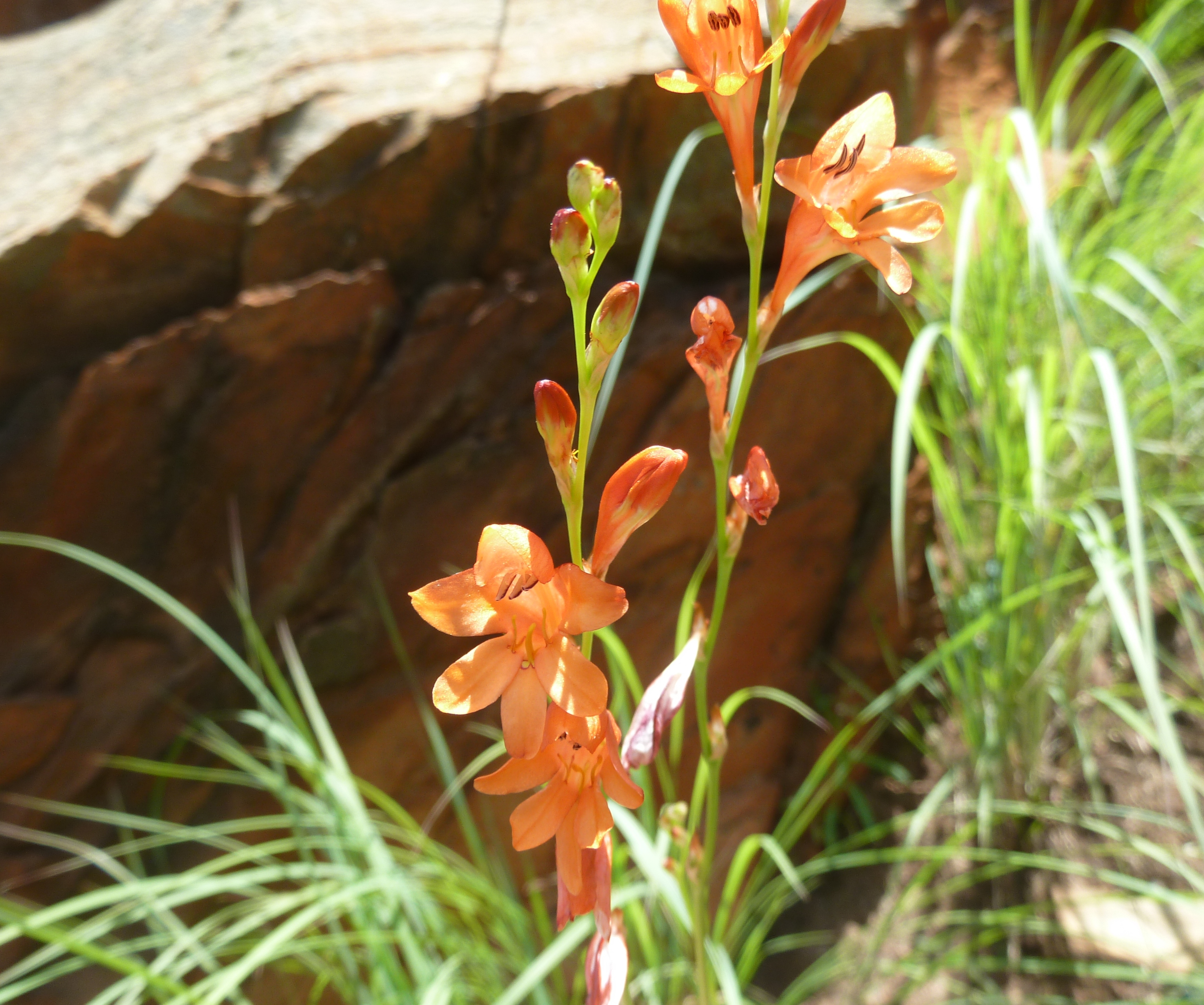

Scientific classification
- Kingdom: Plantae
- Clade: Tracheophytes
- Clade: Angiosperms
- Clade: Monocots
- Order: Asparagales
- Family: Iridaceae
- Genus: Tritonia
- Species: T. nelsonii

Binomial name
- Tritonia nelsonii Baker, (1892)

Synonyms
- Tritonia petrophila Baker

= Tritonia nelsonii =

Species of flowering plant

Tritonia nelsonii is a perennial flowering plant belonging to the genus Tritonia. The species is native to Gauteng, Limpopo, Mpumalanga and Botswana.
