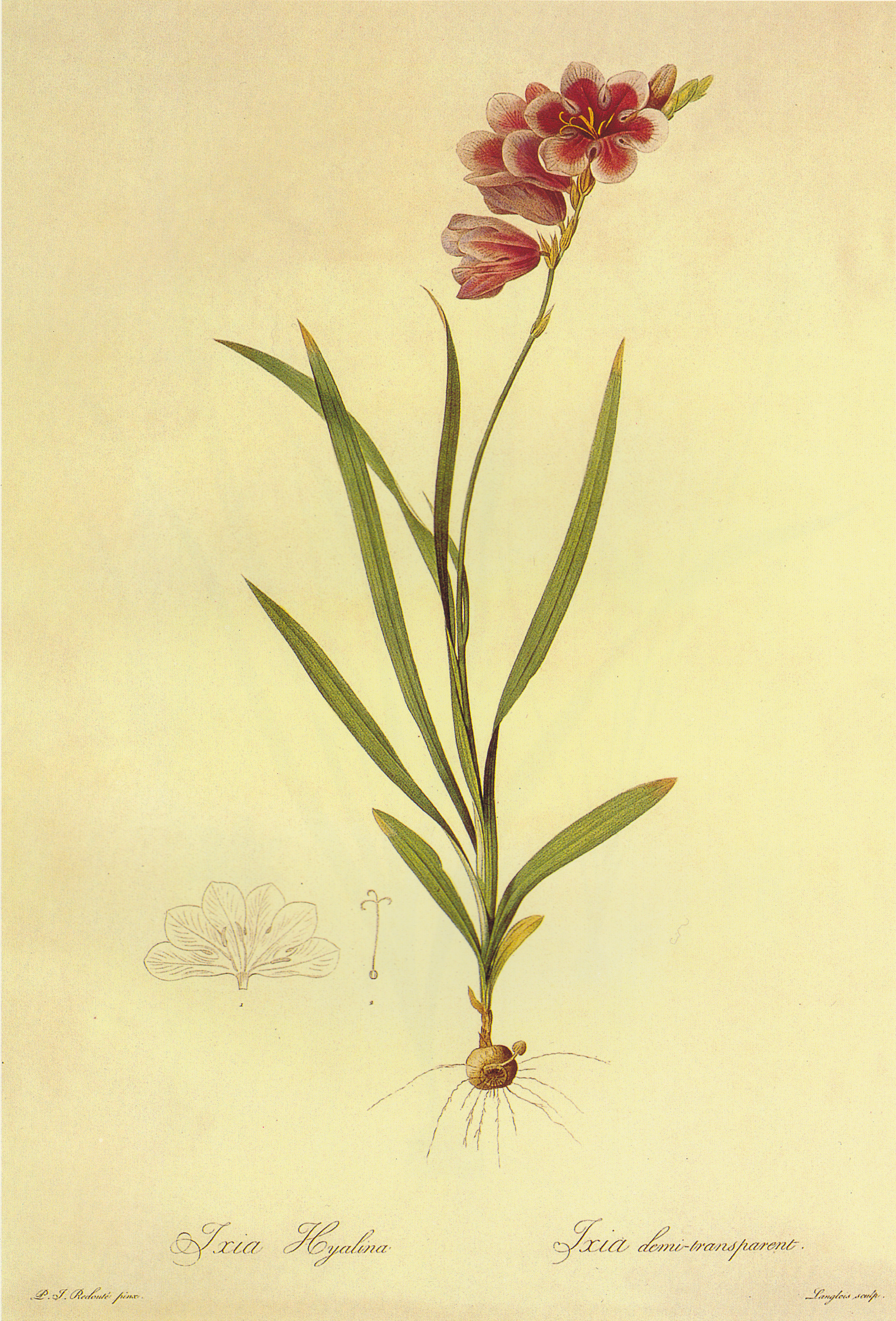

Scientific classification
- Kingdom: Plantae
- Clade: Tracheophytes
- Clade: Angiosperms
- Clade: Monocots
- Order: Asparagales
- Family: Iridaceae
- Genus: Tritonia
- Species: T. squalida

Binomial name
- Tritonia squalida (Aiton) Ker Gawl.,(1802)

Synonyms
- Ixia hyalina Desf. ex Redouté; Ixia similis Salisb.; Ixia squalida Aiton; Montbretia lancea Endl. ex Heynh.; Montbretia squalida (Aiton) Voigt; Tapeinia squalida (Aiton) F.Dietr.; Tritonia magniflora Dehnh.; Tritonia pulchella Dehnh.; Tritonia squalida var. patula Aiton; Tritonixia squalida (Aiton) Klatt; Waitzia squalida (Aiton) Kreysig

= Tritonia squalida =

Species of flowering plant

Tritonia squalida is a tuberous geophyte belonging to the genus Tritonia. The species is endemic to the Western Cape and occurs from Riversdale to Albertinia and Stilbaai. The species has lost its habitat to crop cultivation around Albertina and urban development at Albertina and Stilbaai. Invasive plants are also a threat.
