= Tritonia pallida (plant) =

Scientific classification
- Kingdom: Plantae
- Clade: Tracheophytes
- Clade: Angiosperms
- Clade: Monocots
- Order: Asparagales
- Family: Iridaceae
- Genus: Tritonia
- Species: T. pallida

Binomial name
- Tritonia pallida Ker Gawl. (Baker), 1810

Species of flowering plant

Tritonia pallida is a plant species in the family Iridaceae.

== Subspecies ==
There are two subspecies recognized under T. pallida.

- Tritonia pallida subsp. pallida
- Tritonia pallida subsp. tayloriae
