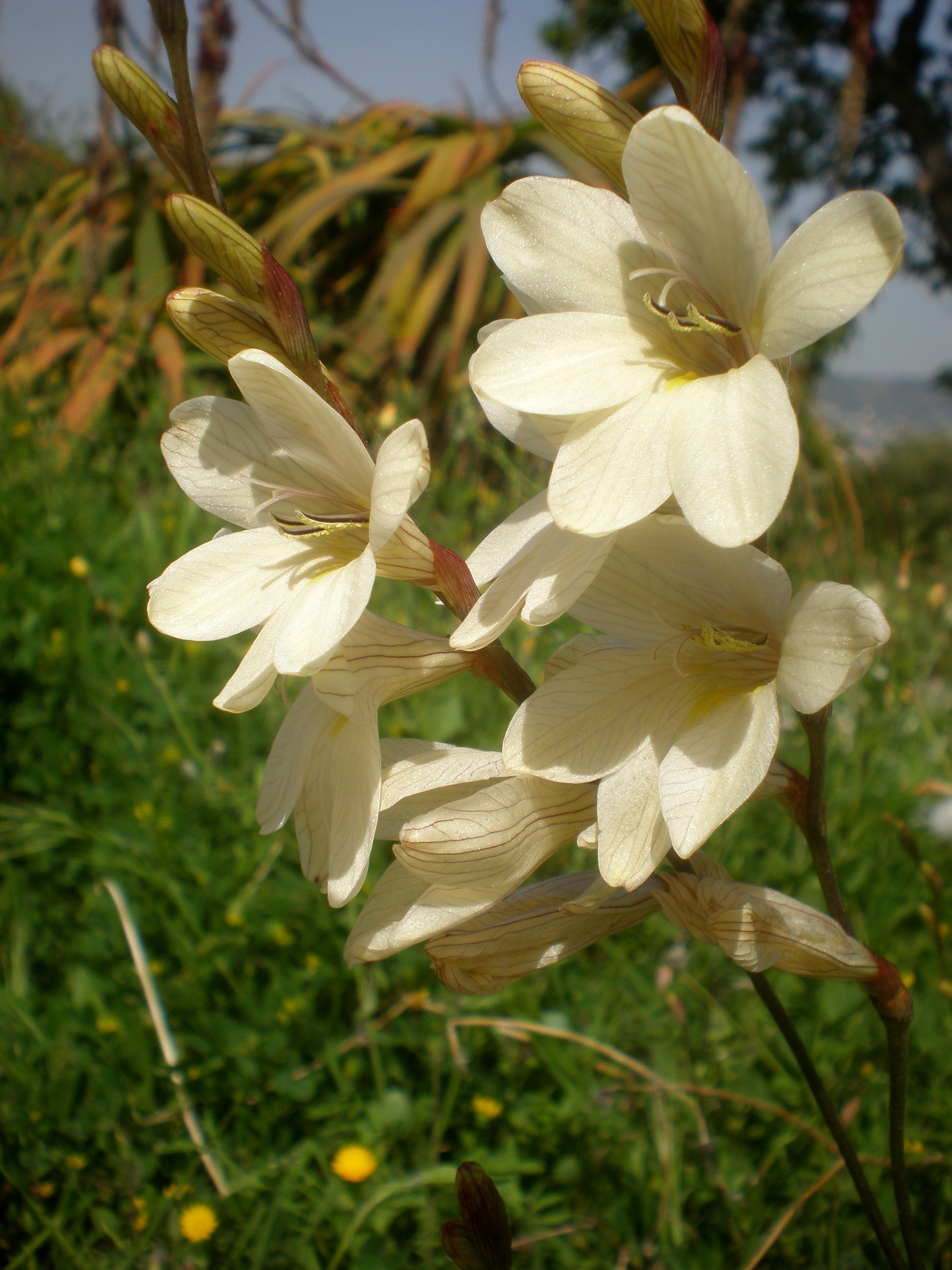

Scientific classification
- Kingdom: Plantae
- Clade: Embryophytes
- Clade: Tracheophytes
- Clade: Spermatophytes
- Clade: Angiosperms
- Clade: Monocots
- Order: Asparagales
- Family: Iridaceae
- Genus: Tritonia
- Species: T. gladiolaris

Binomial name
- Tritonia gladiolaris (Lam.) Goldblatt & J.C.Manning (2006)

Synonyms
- Tritonia catenularis Salisb.; Tritonia flavida Schltr.; Tritonia krausii Baker; Ixia lineata Salisb. 1796:35; Gladiolus lineatus Salisb. 1796:40; Ixia reticulata Thunb.; Ixia striata Vahl; Tritonia tristis Dehnh.; Gladiolus venosus Willd.

= Tritonia gladiolaris =

Species of flowering plant

Tritonia gladiolaris is a perennial flowering plant belonging to the genus Tritonia. The plant is native to KwaZulu-Natal, Lesotho, Mpumalanga, the Eastern Cape and the Western Cape.
