= Tritonia watermeyeri =

Scientific classification
- Kingdom: Plantae
- Clade: Tracheophytes
- Clade: Angiosperms
- Clade: Monocots
- Order: Asparagales
- Family: Iridaceae
- Genus: Tritonia
- Species: T. watermeyeri

Binomial name
- Tritonia watermeyeri L.Bolus, (1926)

Synonyms
- Montbretia watermeyeri (L.Bolus) Sealy; Tritonia securigera subsp. watermeyeri (L.Bolus) J.C.Manning & Goldblatt

Species of flowering plant

Tritonia watermeyeri is a tuberous geophyte that is part of the genus Tritonia. The species is endemic to the Western Cape. It occurs between west of Robertson to Montagu past Barrydale and up to the Anysberg. The species currently has no threats. The species has an area of occurrence of 4 967 km² and is part of the Renosterveld. The species has lost 6% of its habitat to crop cultivation but the situation has stabilized.
