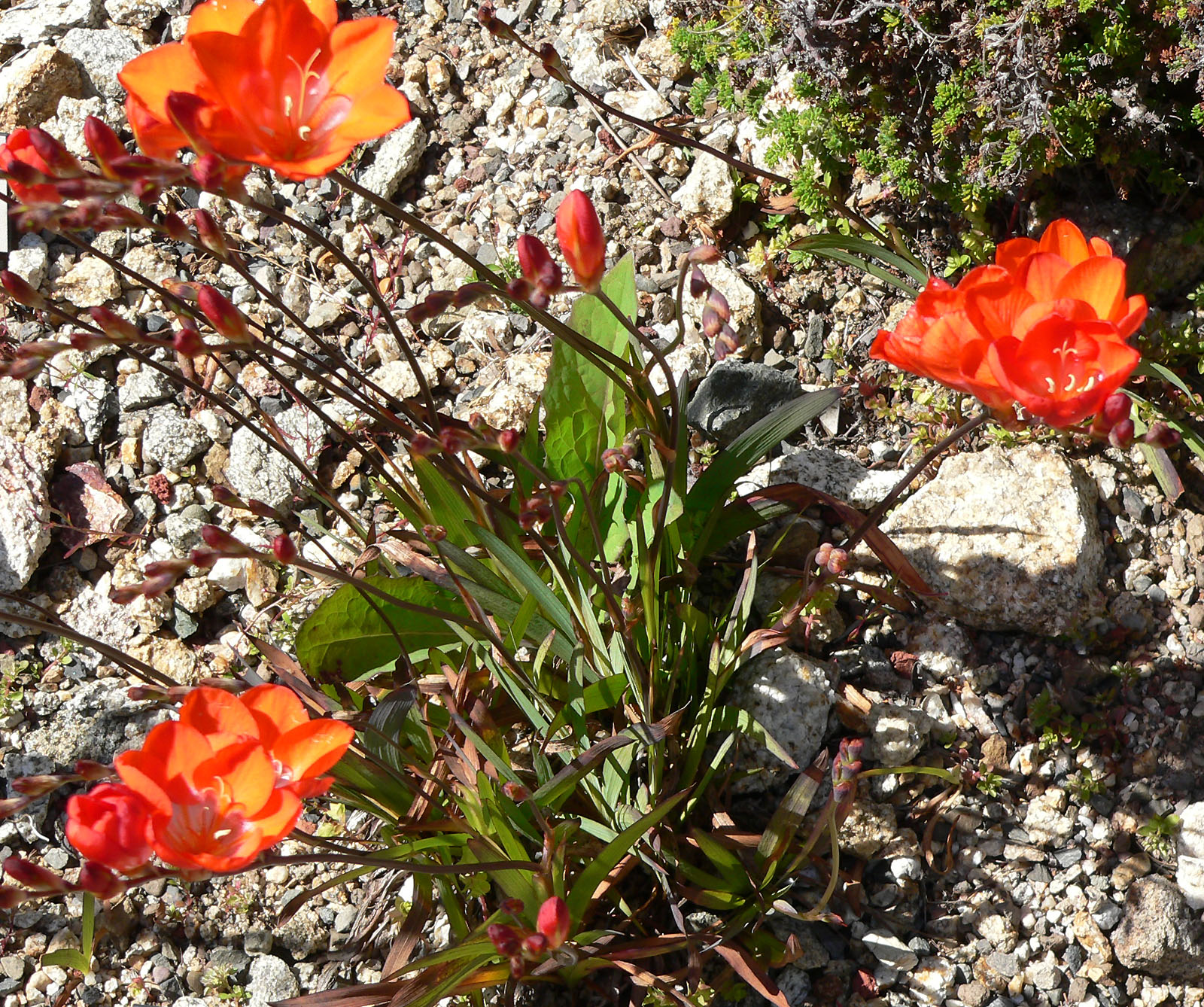
- Tritonia crocata

Scientific classification
- Kingdom: Plantae
- Clade: Embryophytes
- Clade: Tracheophytes
- Clade: Spermatophytes
- Clade: Angiosperms
- Clade: Monocots
- Order: Asparagales
- Family: Iridaceae
- Subfamily: Crocoideae
- Tribe: Croceae
- Genus: Tritonia; Ker Gawl.

Type species
- Tritonia squalida (Aiton) Ker Gawl.

Synonyms
- Waitzia Rchb.; Montbretia DC.; Belendenia Raf.; Tritonixia Klatt; Montbretiopsis L.Bolus

= Tritonia (plant) =

Genus of flowering plants

Tritonia (flame freesia) is a genus of flowering plants in the iris family first described as a genus in 1802. They are naturally distributed across southern Africa, with a high concentration of species in Cape Province of western South Africa. The genus is closely related to the genus Ixia.

Tritonia are small bulbous plants up to 80 cm, that appear in great numbers in spring. The leaves are fan-shaped. The flowers are shades of yellow, orange or brown, sweet-smelling, and give off a very strong fragrance, especially at night. They are not grazed.

The genus name is derived from the Latin word triton, meaning "weathervane", and alludes to the apparently random arrangement of the stamens in some species.

== Cultivation ==
Hardiness: Zones 8–11

Species

- Tritonia atrorubens L.Bolus - Cape Province
- Tritonia bakeri Klatt - Cape Province
- Tritonia cedarmontana Goldblatt & J.C.Manning - Cedarberg in Cape Province
- Tritonia chrysantha Fourc. - Cape Province
- Tritonia cooperi (Baker) Klatt - Cape Province
- Tritonia crocata (L.) Ker Gawl. - Cape Province
- Tritonia delpierrei M.P.de Vos - Cape Province
- Tritonia deusta (Aiton) Ker Gawl. - Cape Province
- Tritonia disticha (Klatt) Baker - South Africa, Eswatini
- Tritonia drakensbergensis M.P.de Vos - Cape Province
- Tritonia dubia Eckl. ex Klatt - Cape Province
- Tritonia flabellifolia (D.Delaroche) G.J.Lewis - Cape Province
- Tritonia florentiae (Marloth) Goldblatt - Cape Province
- Tritonia gladiolaris (Lam.) Goldblatt & J.C.Manning - South Africa, Lesotho; naturalized in Australia
- Tritonia kamisbergensis Klatt - Cape Province
- Tritonia karooica M.P.de Vos - Cape Province
- Tritonia lancea (Thunb.) N.E.Br. - Cape Province
- Tritonia laxifolia (Klatt) Baker - South Africa, Zambia, Malawi, Tanzania
- Tritonia linearifolia Goldblatt & J.C.Manning - Cape Province
- Tritonia marlothii M.P.de Vos - Cape Province
- Tritonia moggii Oberm. - Mozambique
- Tritonia nelsonii Baker - Botswana, Northern Province of South Africa
- Tritonia pallida Ker Gawl. - Cape Province
- Tritonia parvula N.E.Br. - Cape Province
- Tritonia securigera (Aiton) Ker Gawl. - Cape Province
- Tritonia squalida (Aiton) Ker Gawl. - Cape Province; naturalized in Australia
- Tritonia strictifolia (Klatt) Pax - Cape Province
- Tritonia tugwelliae L.Bolus - Cape Province
- Tritonia undulata (Burm.f.) Baker - Cape Province
- Tritonia watermeyeri L.Bolus - Cape Province
