= Miriam Phoebe de Vos =

South African botanist (b.1912 d.2005)

- Born: Zastron, South Africa
- Died: 2005; Stellenbosch, South Africa
- Education: Stellenbosch University
- Known for: Romulea
- Scientific career
- Workplaces: University of Cape Town; Stellenbosch University
- Thesis: A cytological study on South African genera of the Aizoaceae and the Proteacea (1940)

Miriam Phoebe de Vos (26 November 1912 Zastron – 2005 Stellenbosch) was a leading South African botanist and academic. She was an expert on bulbous plants, especially Romulea. She also had a special interest in Moraea and Clivia.

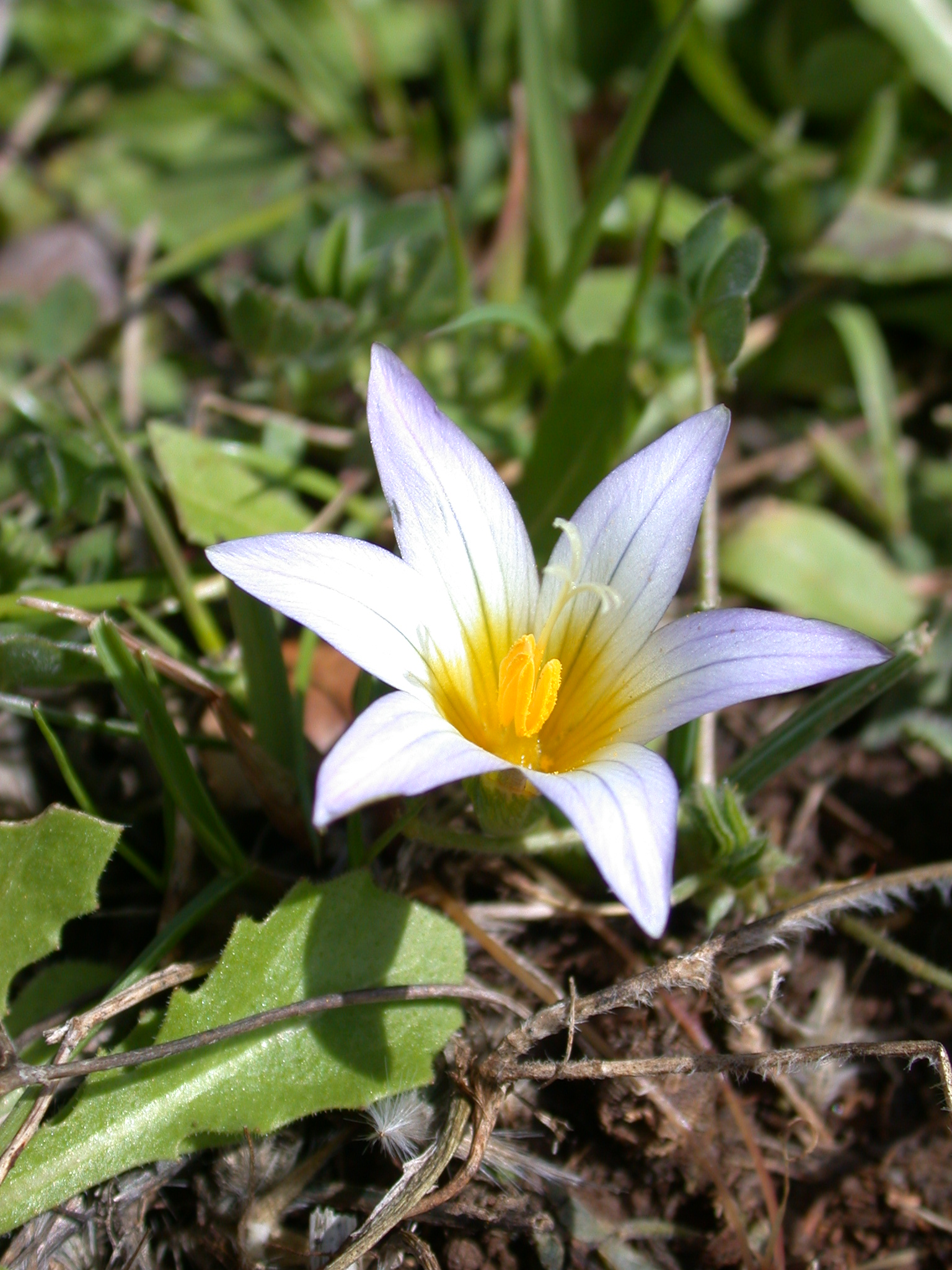
Romulea bulbocodium

== Career ==
She studied at the University of Stellenbosch and obtained her BSc (cum laude) and MSc (cum laude). She held a junior lecture position from 1939 at the University of Cape Town.

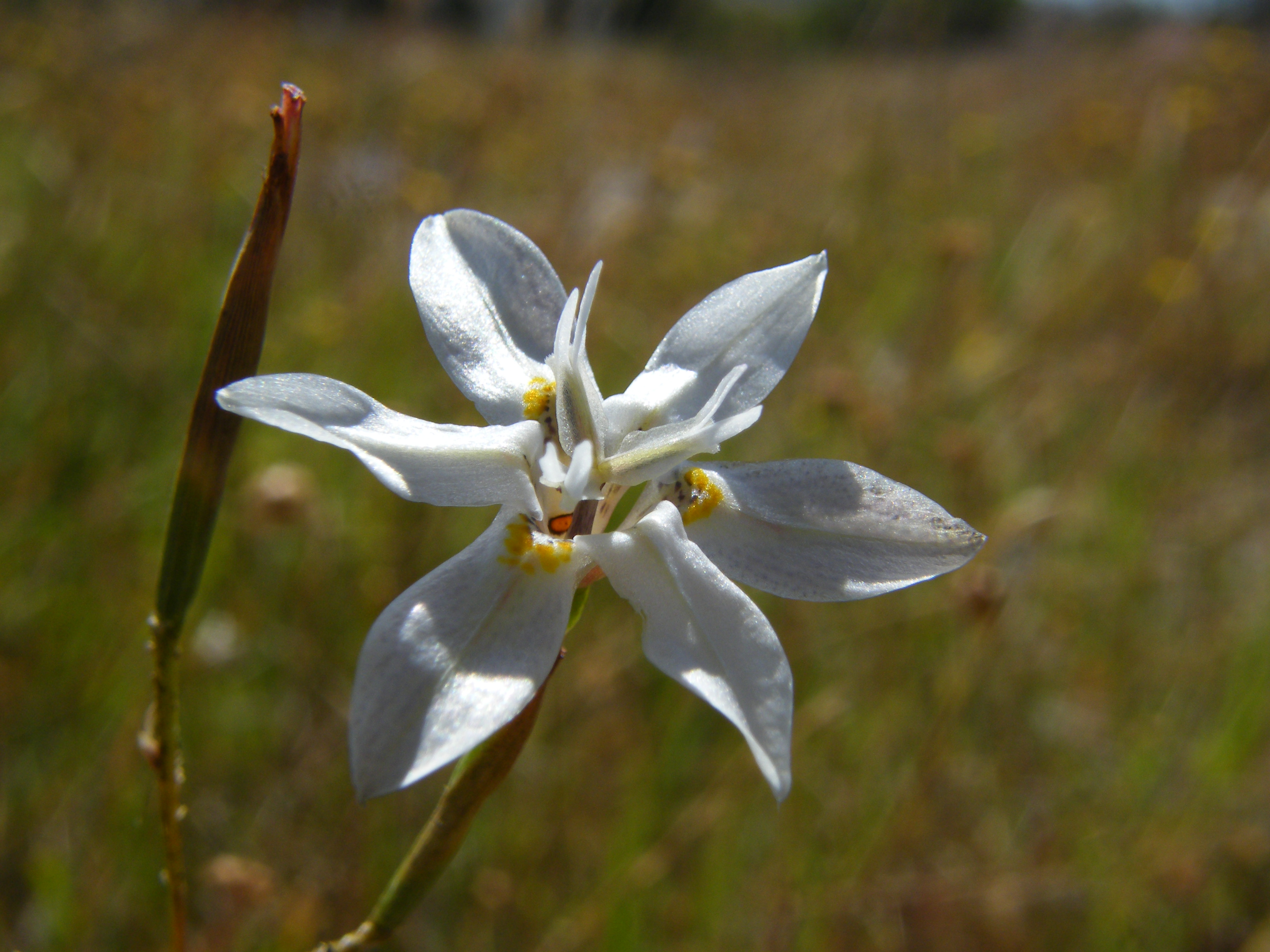
Moraea viscaria

She obtained a DSc in Botany in 1940 from Stellenbosch University with the thesis "A cytological study on South African genera of the Aizoaceae and the Proteacea". In 1941 she joined the Botany Department of the University of Stellenbosch. Cytology, embryology, anatomy and biosystematics were the subjects she lectured in. Her main areas of interest included cytotaxonomy and embryology, especially of Iridaceae.

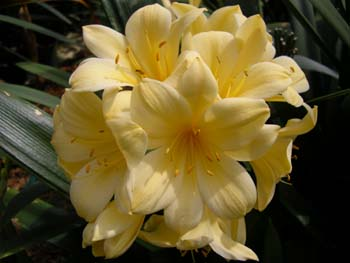
Clivia miniata

The cytology of the Proteaceae and the Aizoaceae as well as the embryology of several genera were her first research contributions, followed by the taxonomy of Iridaceae. In 1972 the Journal of South African Botany published her morphology and taxonomy of the genus Romulea. Romulea elliptica M.P.de Vos was identified in 1972 and by 1980 had become a vulnerable species. In 2012 it was declared endangered.

She retired in 1977 and thereafter published nine more scientific papers (bringing the total to 37). These included revisions of Tritonia, Crocosmia, Chasmantha and Ixia. She also assisted with the compilation of Flora of Namaqualand.

== Awards ==
- Queen Victoria Stipendium (1935)
- Carnegie bursary (1959)
- Havenga prize for Biology (1974)

== Eponyms ==
- The genus Devia in the Iridaceae was named in her honour by the South African botanists Peter Goldblatt and John Charles Manning in 1990.
- In 1975 de Vos published the genus Duthiastrum in the Iridacea in the South African Biographical Dictionary in honour of Augusta Vera Duthie.
- In 1988 she published Ixia frederickii in the South African Biographical Dictionary in honour of Frederick W. Duckitt.

== Selected publications ==
- de Vos, Miriam Phoebe (1940). A cytological study on South African genera of the Aizoaceae and the Proteaceae (D.Sc.). University of Stellenbosch. hdl:10019.1/50777.
- Goldblatt, P.; de Vos, M.P. (1989). "The reduction of Oenostachys, Homoglossum and Anomalesia, putative sunbird pollinated genera, in Gladiolus L. (Iridaceae-Ixioideae)". Bulletin du Muséum National d'Histoire Naturelle. 11 (4). Bulletin du Muséum National d'Histoire Naturelle Section B, Adansonia, botanique, phytochimie: 417–428.
- M.P. de Vos; P. Goldblatt; G. Germishuizen; A.A. Obermeyer; et al. (1983–1999). Flora of Southern Africa : which deals with the territories of South Africa, Ciskei, Transkei, Lesotho, Swaziland, Bophuthatswana, South West Africa/Namibia, Botswana and Venda. Pretoria: National Botanical Institute. OCLC 772307671.
- de Vos, M.P. (1952). Nuwe en minder bekende Romulea-species van die Roggeveld [New and less well known Romulea-species of the Roggeveld] (in Afrikaans and Dutch). Cape Town: Nasionale Pers, Beperk. OCLC 29083807.
- de Vos, Miriam (1949). Die lewe van nie-groen plante [The life of the non-green plants] (in Afrikaans, German, and English). Bloemfontein: Nasionale Pers, Beperk. OCLC 71118510.
