= Neomarica caerulea =

- Neomarica caerulea in Nova Friburgo

Scientific classification
- Kingdom: Plantae
- Clade: Tracheophytes
- Clade: Angiosperms
- Clade: Monocots
- Order: Asparagales
- Family: Iridaceae
- Genus: Neomarica
- Species: N. caerulea

Binomial name
- Neomarica caerulea Sprague

Species of plant

Neomarica caerulea is a species of plant in the genus Trimezia of the family Iridaceae. This species is native to Brazil.

Neomarica caerulea grows to a height of 0.90–1.20 m.
