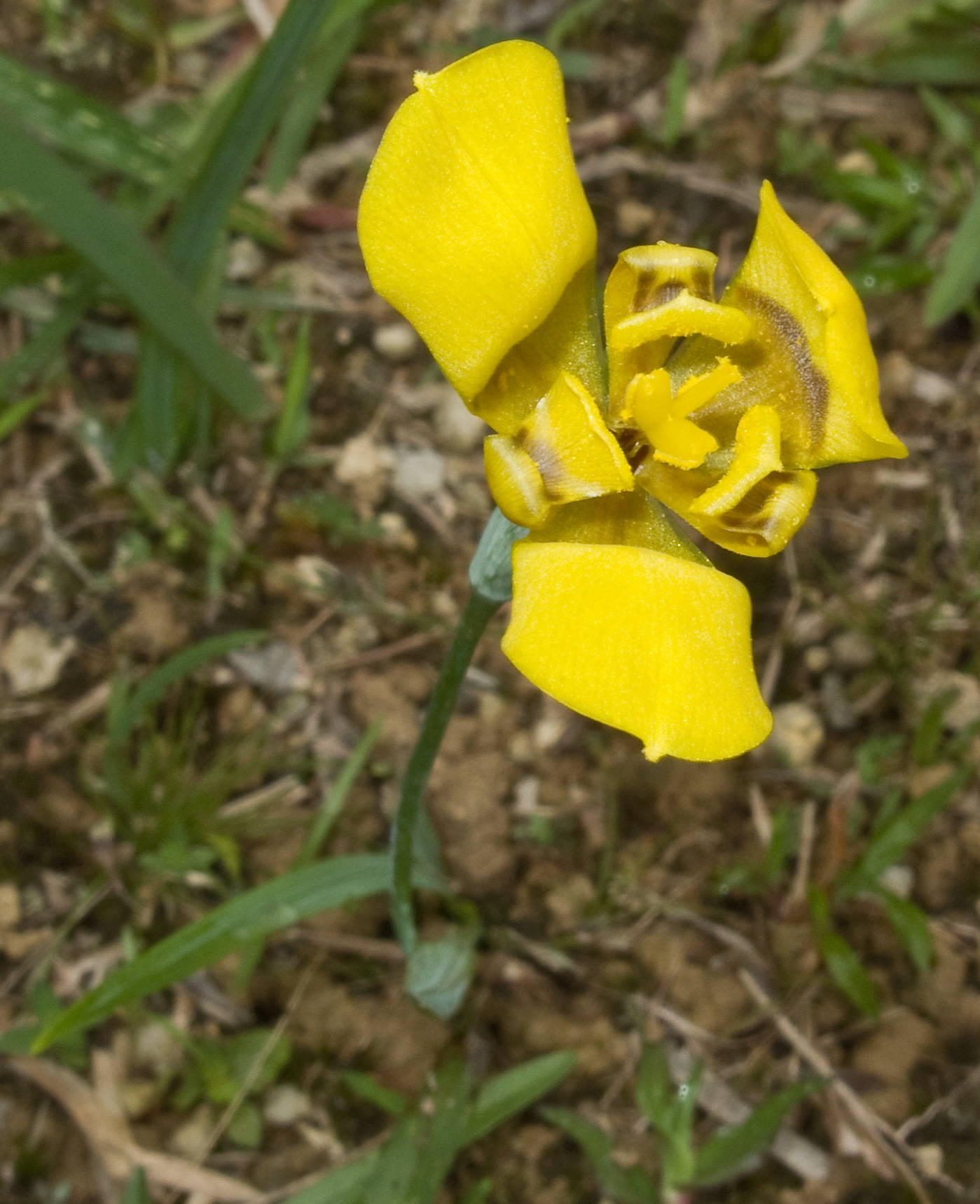
- Naturalized in Malaysia

Scientific classification
- Kingdom: Plantae
- Clade: Tracheophytes
- Clade: Angiosperms
- Clade: Monocots
- Order: Asparagales
- Family: Iridaceae
- Genus: Trimezia
- Species: T. martinicensis

Binomial name
- Trimezia martinicensis (Jacq.) Herb.

= Trimezia martinicensis =

Species of flowering plant

Trimezia martinicensis is a species of bulbous plant in the family Iridaceae. Originally from South America and the West Indies, it is now widely naturalized throughout the tropics. Common names include Martinique trimezia, yellow walking iris and forenoon yellow flag.

== Distinction from Trimezia steyermarkii ==
Trimezia martinicensis is closely related to T. steyermarkii, with which it has been widely confused. Clive Innes describes T. martinicensis as having a brown mark at the base of each outer tepal, whereas T. steyermarkii has brownish-purple bands. In Kubitzki & Huber (1998), the flowers of T. martinicensis are shown as opening less widely than those of T. steyermarkii. The inner tepals of both species are S-shaped in cross-section; those of T. martinicensis are more-or-less upright (Innes describes them as "folded inwards"), whereas those of T. steyermarkii bend outwards into a more elongated shape so that the top of the S is not visible from above. A diagnostic feature is that the style crests of T. martinicensis are short, whereas those of T. steyermarkii are longer, about 3–4 mm (0.12–0.16 in) long, comparable in length to its anthers, which are about 4 mm (0.16 in) long. Another difference is that the leaves of T. martinicensis are narrower, only about 1.3 cm (0.5 in) wide, whereas those of T. steyermarkii are 2.5–3.4 cm (1.0–1.3 in) wide.
