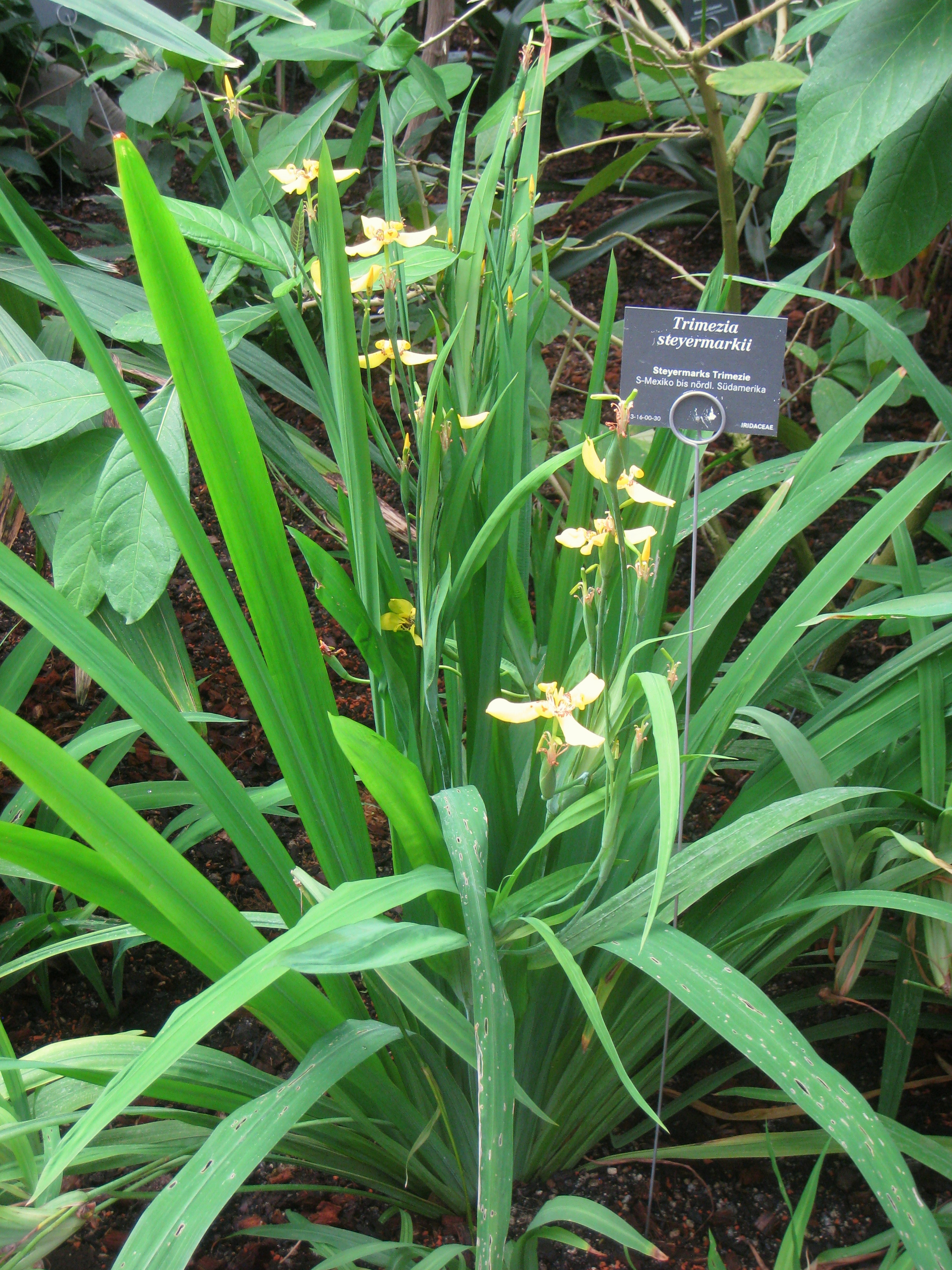

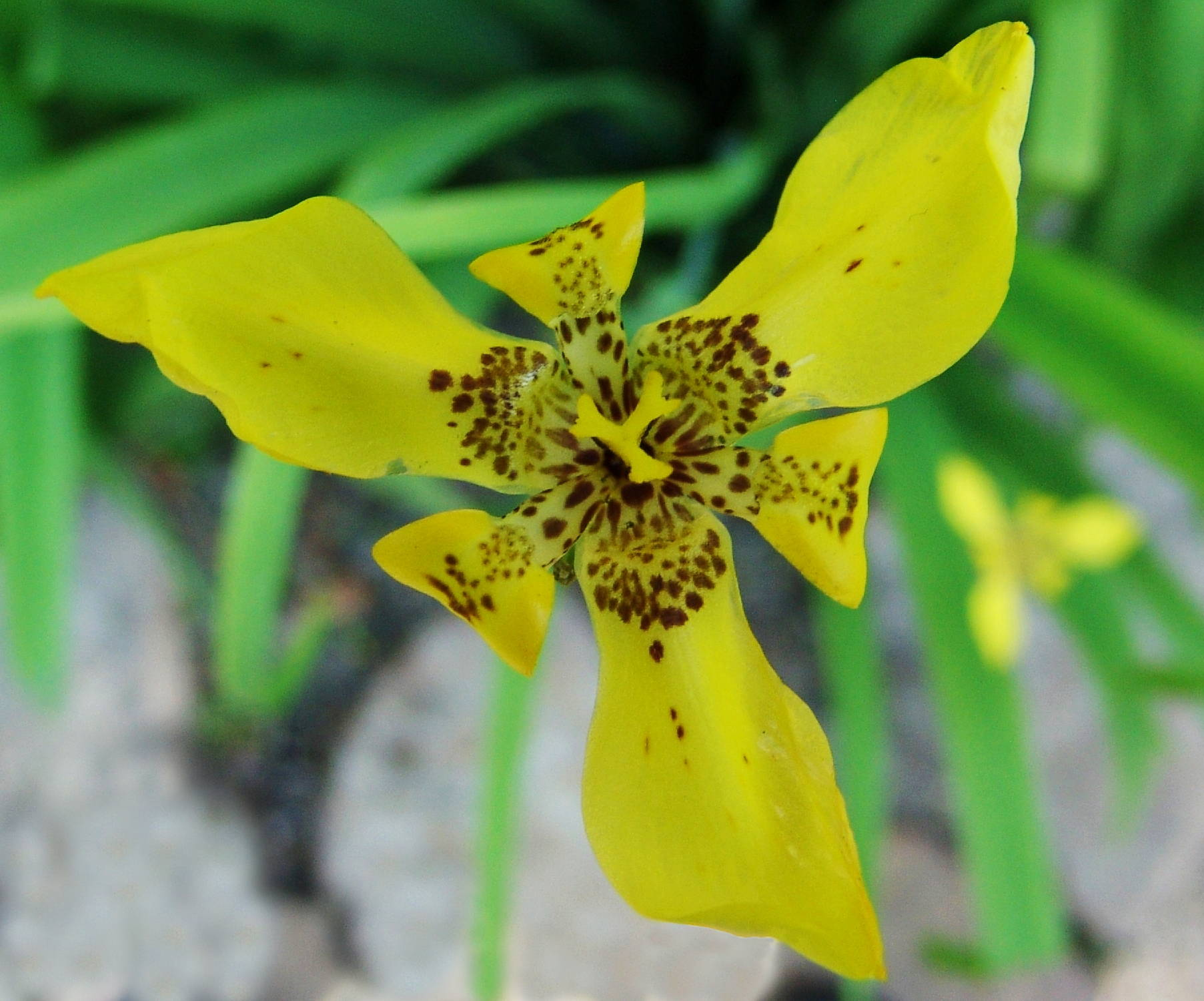

Scientific classification
- Kingdom: Plantae
- Clade: Tracheophytes
- Clade: Angiosperms
- Clade: Monocots
- Order: Asparagales
- Family: Iridaceae
- Genus: Trimezia
- Species: T. steyermarkii

Binomial name
- Trimezia steyermarkii R. C. Foster

= Trimezia steyermarkii =

Species of flowering plant

Trimezia steyermarkii is a species of flowering plant in the family Iridaceae, native to southern Mexico, Central America, Colombia, and Venezuela. Plants are up to 150 cm tall, with rhizomes up to 2–4 cm long and 2–3 cm wide; leaves are lanceolate, 60–150 cm long by 2 cm wide; flowers are yellow with brown spots. In countries like Colombia and Venezuela, a name that is often given to this plant is "Hand of God" because of the three flower petals.

Trimezia steyermarkii is closely related to T. martinicensis, with which it has been widely confused. See that article for differences.
