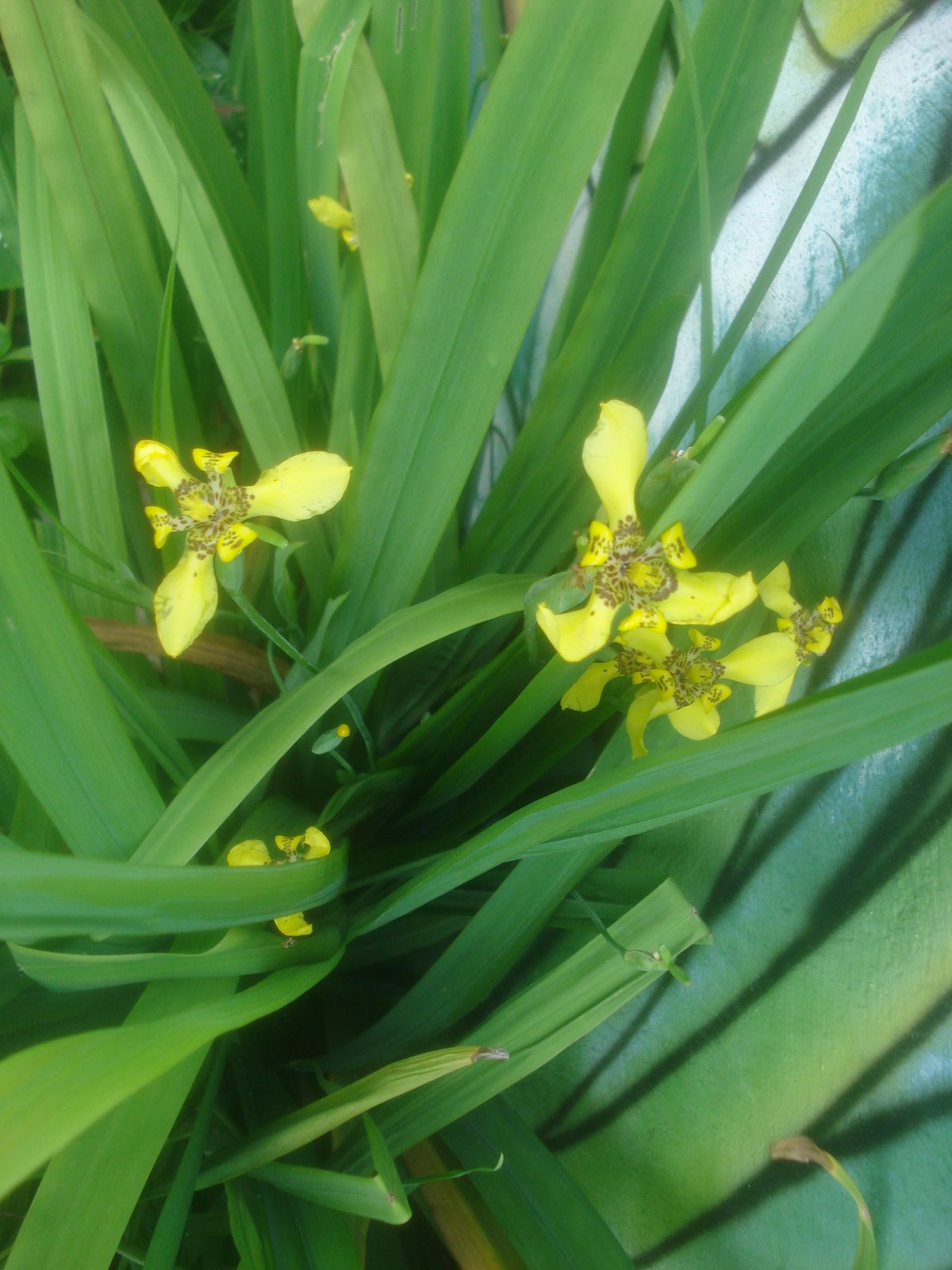

Scientific classification
- Kingdom: Plantae
- Clade: Tracheophytes
- Clade: Angiosperms
- Clade: Monocots
- Order: Asparagales
- Family: Iridaceae
- Genus: Trimezia
- Species: T. fosteriana

Binomial name
- Trimezia fosteriana Steyerm.

= Trimezia fosteriana =

Species of flowering plant

Trimezia fosteriana is a species of bulbous plant in the family Iridaceae. Due to the attractive aspect of its leaves and exuberant and delicate yellow flowers, it is widely used in cities in South America for ornamental purposes and gardening. This species is easily confused with Trimezia longifolia, due to the similarity of its yellow flowers. However, the latter species, placed in the genus Neomarica by some sources, is distinguished by the presence of a flattened (leaf-like) flower stem.

== Distribution ==
Native to Venezuela, this species is widely cultivated through the world, due to cold tolerance, although a tropical climate.
