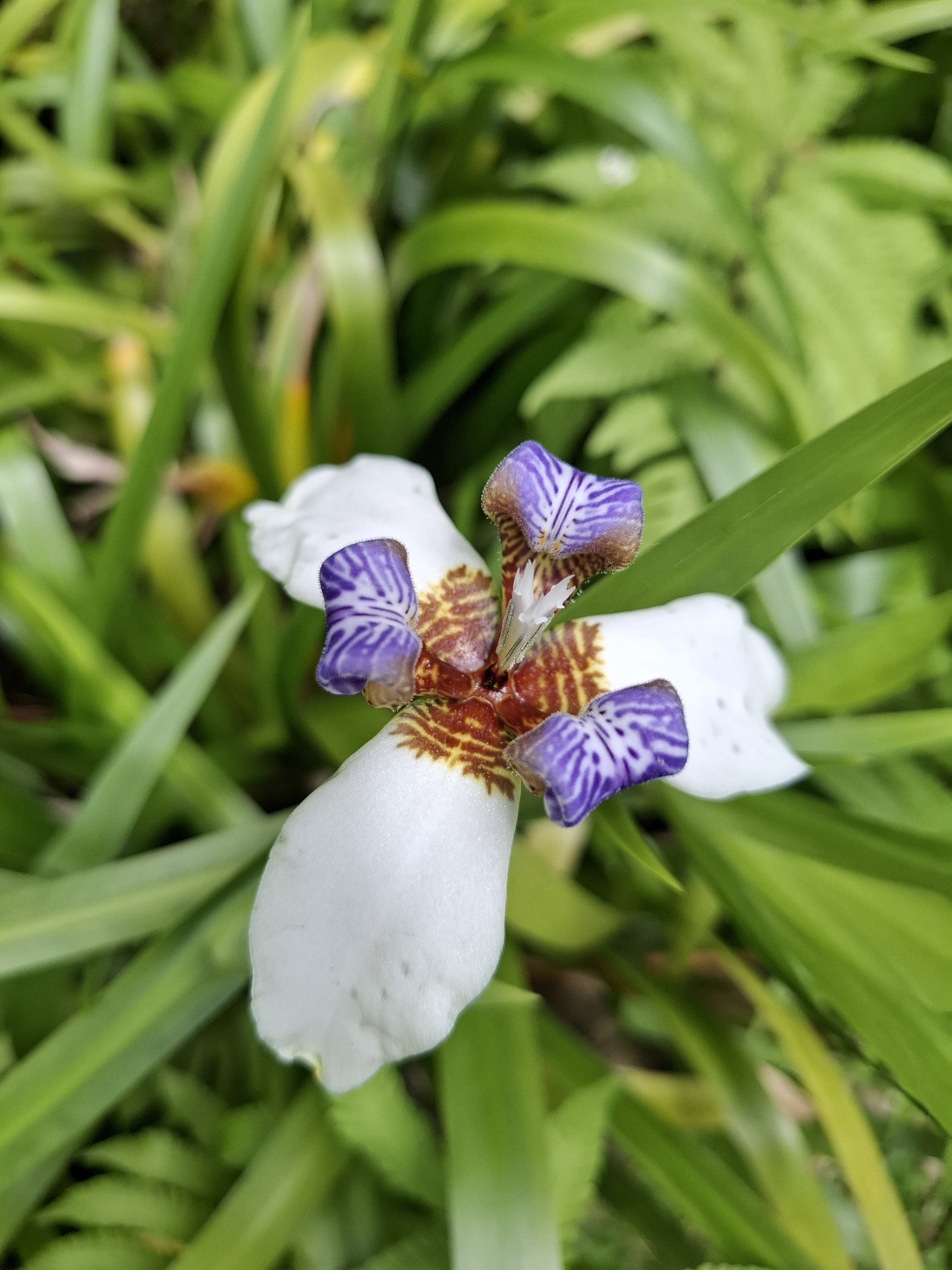

Scientific classification
- Kingdom: Plantae
- Clade: Embryophytes
- Clade: Tracheophytes
- Clade: Angiosperms
- Clade: Monocots
- Order: Asparagales
- Family: Iridaceae
- Genus: Trimezia
- Species: T. northiana

Binomial name
- Trimezia northiana (Schneev.) Ravenna

Synonyms
- Cipura northiana (Schneev.) Endl.; Cipura sabini Heynh.; Cypella northiana (Schneev.) Klatt; Ferraria elegans Salisb.; Iris northiana (Schneev.) Pers.; Marica northiana (Schneev.) Ker Gawl.; Marica pantherina Salisb.; Marica sabini G.Lodd.; Marica sabiniana Lodd. ex Voigt; Moraea northiana Schneev.; Moraea vaginata Redouté; Neomarica northiana (Schneev.) Sprague

= Trimezia northiana =

Species of flowering plant

Trimezia northiana, synonym Neomarica northiana, also known as North's false flag or walking iris, is a flowering plant native to Brazil that has a rhizomatous rootstock and belongs to the iris family, Iridaceae.

== Reproduction ==
Plantlets grow at the ends of the flower stalks. As the plantlets grow, their weight causes the stalk to dip to the ground where they take root.

== Gallery ==
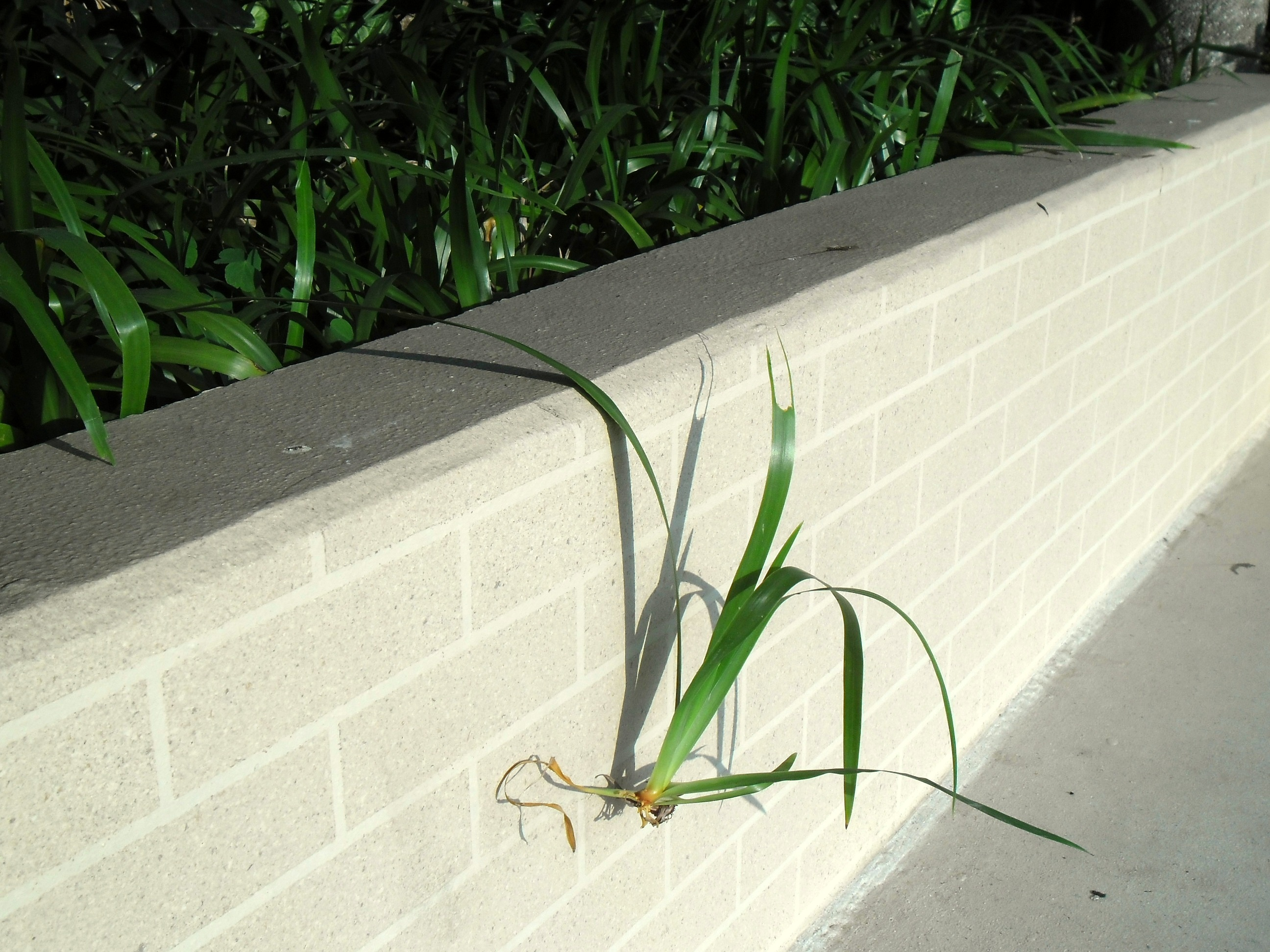
Vegetative reproduction, involving 2 or 1 plantlets growing on the stem which previously flowered

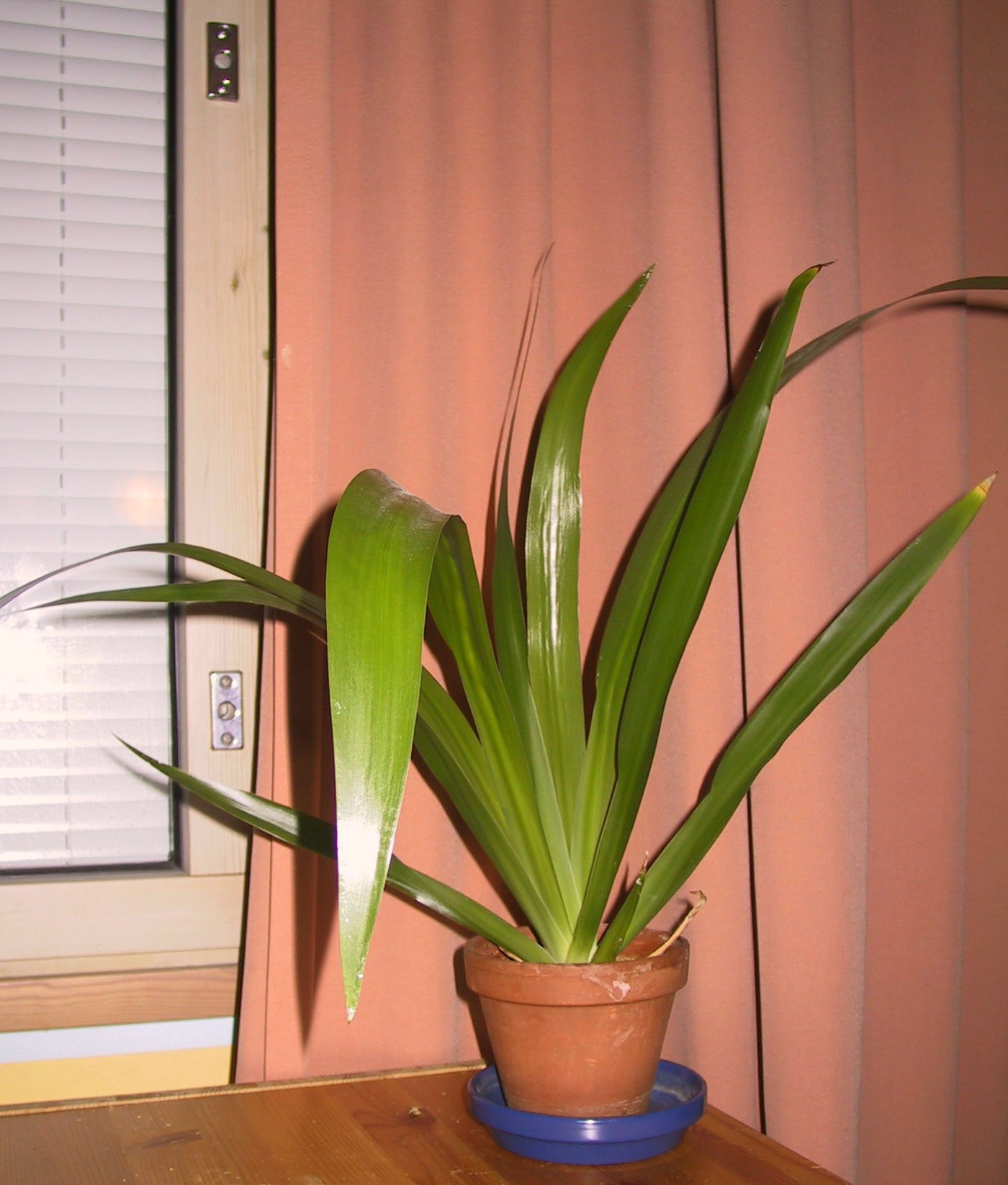
Plant
