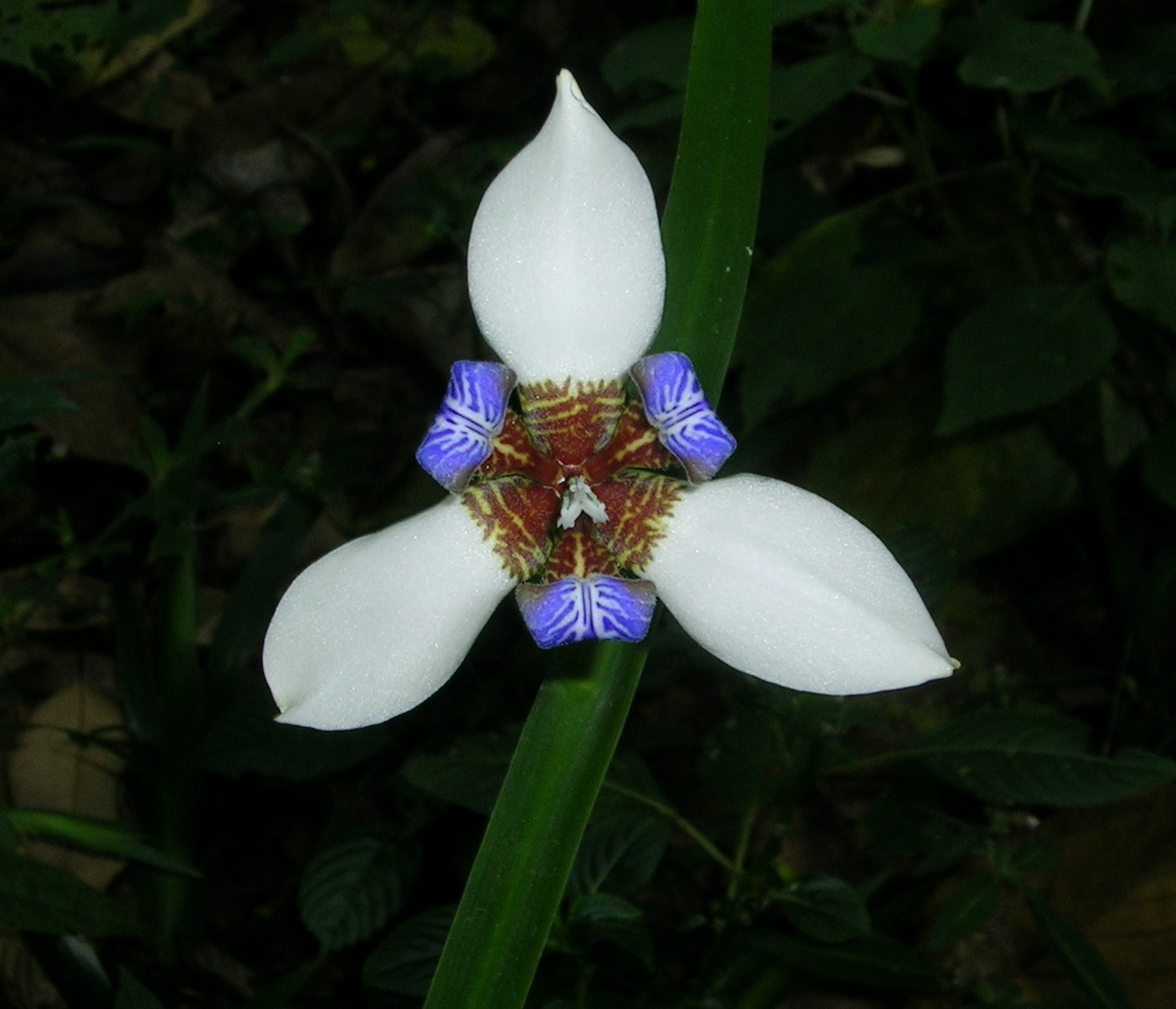

Scientific classification
- Kingdom: Plantae
- Clade: Tracheophytes
- Clade: Angiosperms
- Clade: Monocots
- Order: Asparagales
- Family: Iridaceae
- Genus: Trimezia
- Species: T. candida

Binomial name
- Trimezia candida (Hassl.) Ravenna

Synonyms
- Neomarica candida (Hassl.) Sprague.

= Trimezia candida =

Species of flowering plant

Trimezia candida, synonym Neomarica candida, also known as white walking iris, is species of flowering plant. It was first described by Emil Hassler and given the name Neomarica candida by Thomas Archibald Sprague. Trimezia candida belongs to the genus Trimezia and family Iridaceae.

These types of plants are found in Paraguay, Brazil, northeastern Argentina and Uruguay.

== Gallery ==
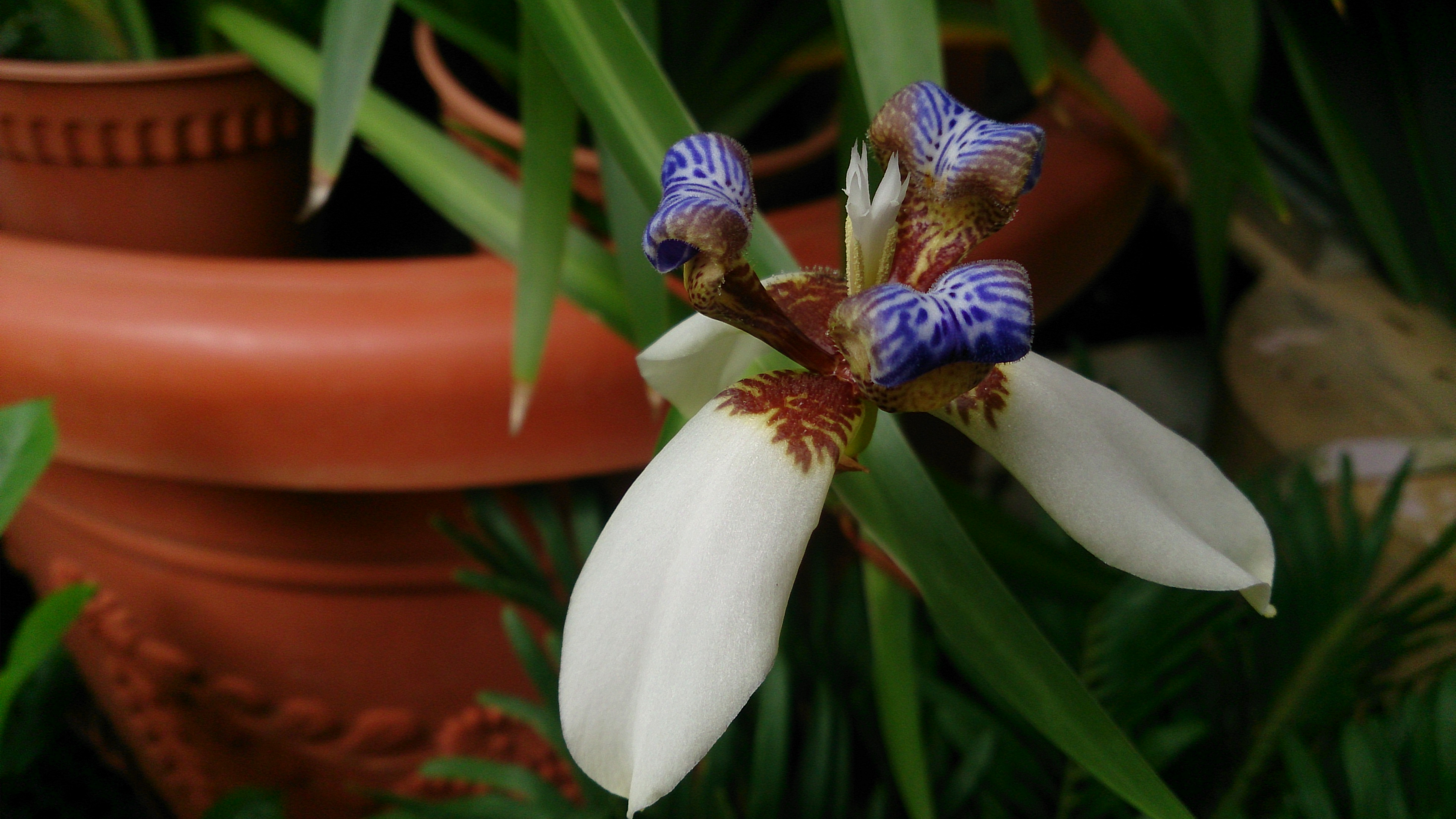
Flower up close

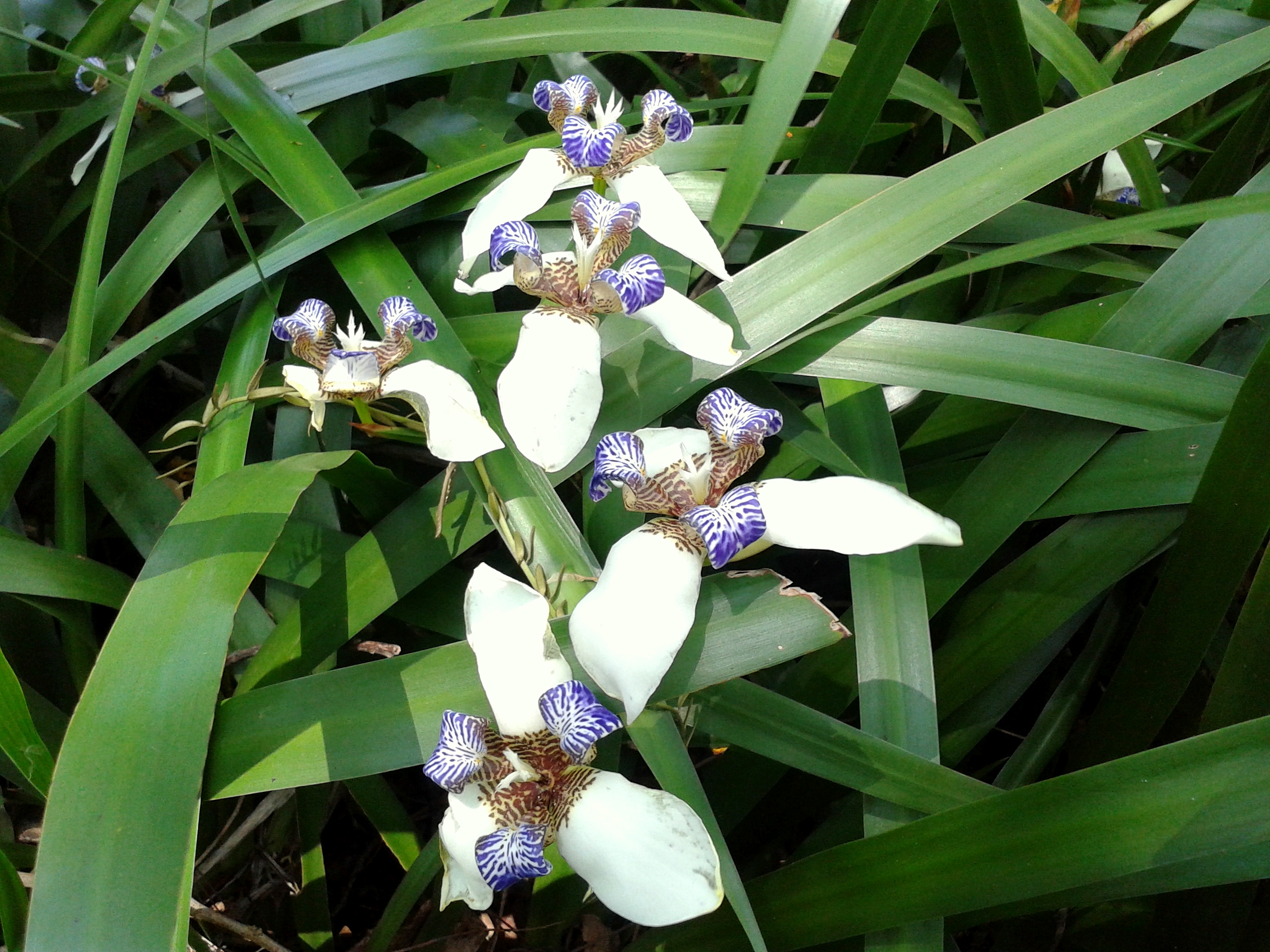
Multiple flowers
