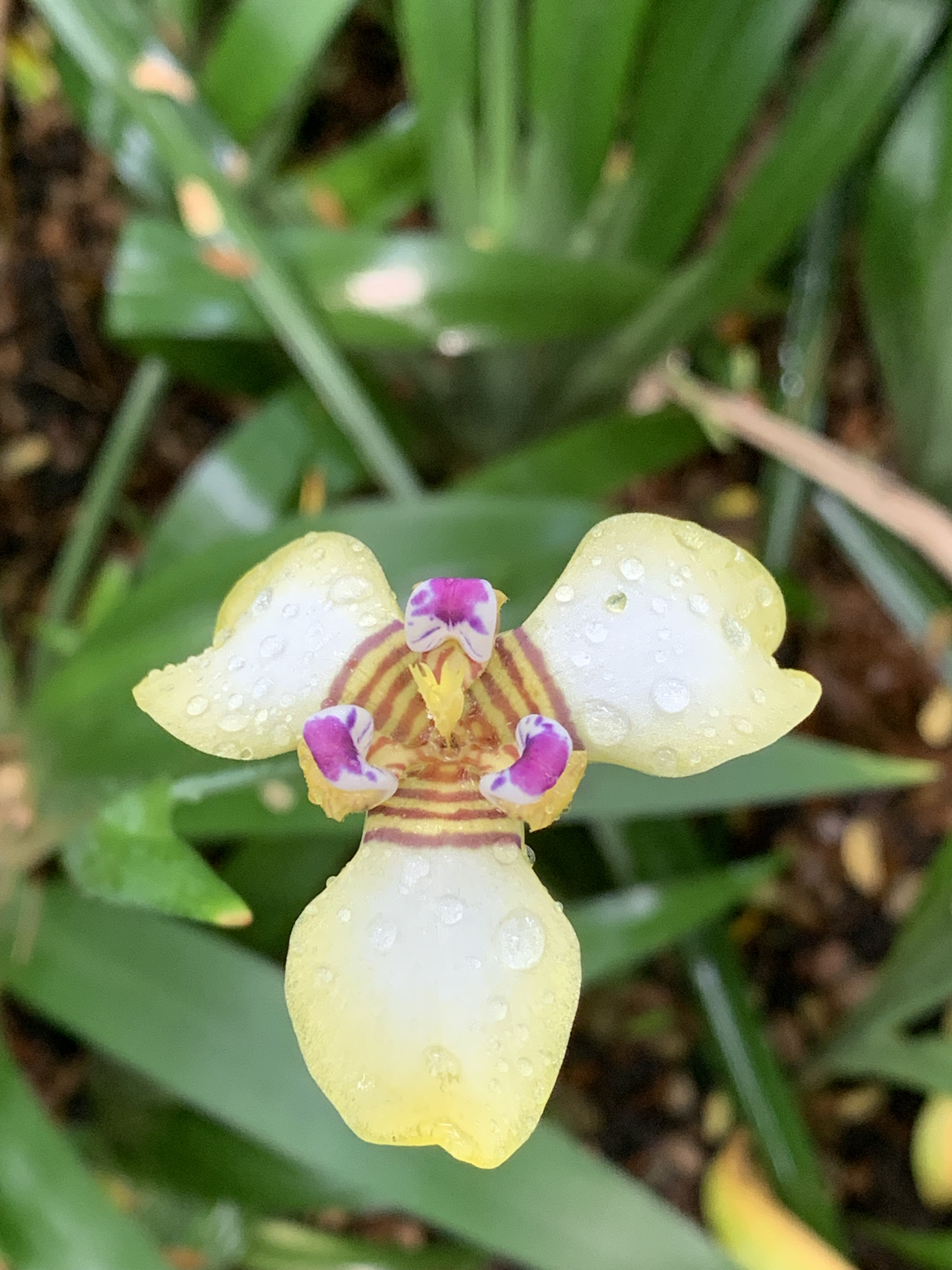

Scientific classification
- Kingdom: Plantae
- Clade: Tracheophytes
- Clade: Angiosperms
- Clade: Monocots
- Order: Asparagales
- Family: Iridaceae
- Genus: Trimezia
- Species: T. humilis

Binomial name
- Trimezia humilis Ravenna

= Trimezia humilis =

Species of flowering plant

Trimezia humilis is a species of bulbous plant in the family Iridaceae. Native to Venezuela and parts of Brazil. The species was originally named Cypella humilis by Friedrich Wilhelm Klatt in 1862. Pierfelice Ravenna then moved the species into the genus Trimezia in 1977.
