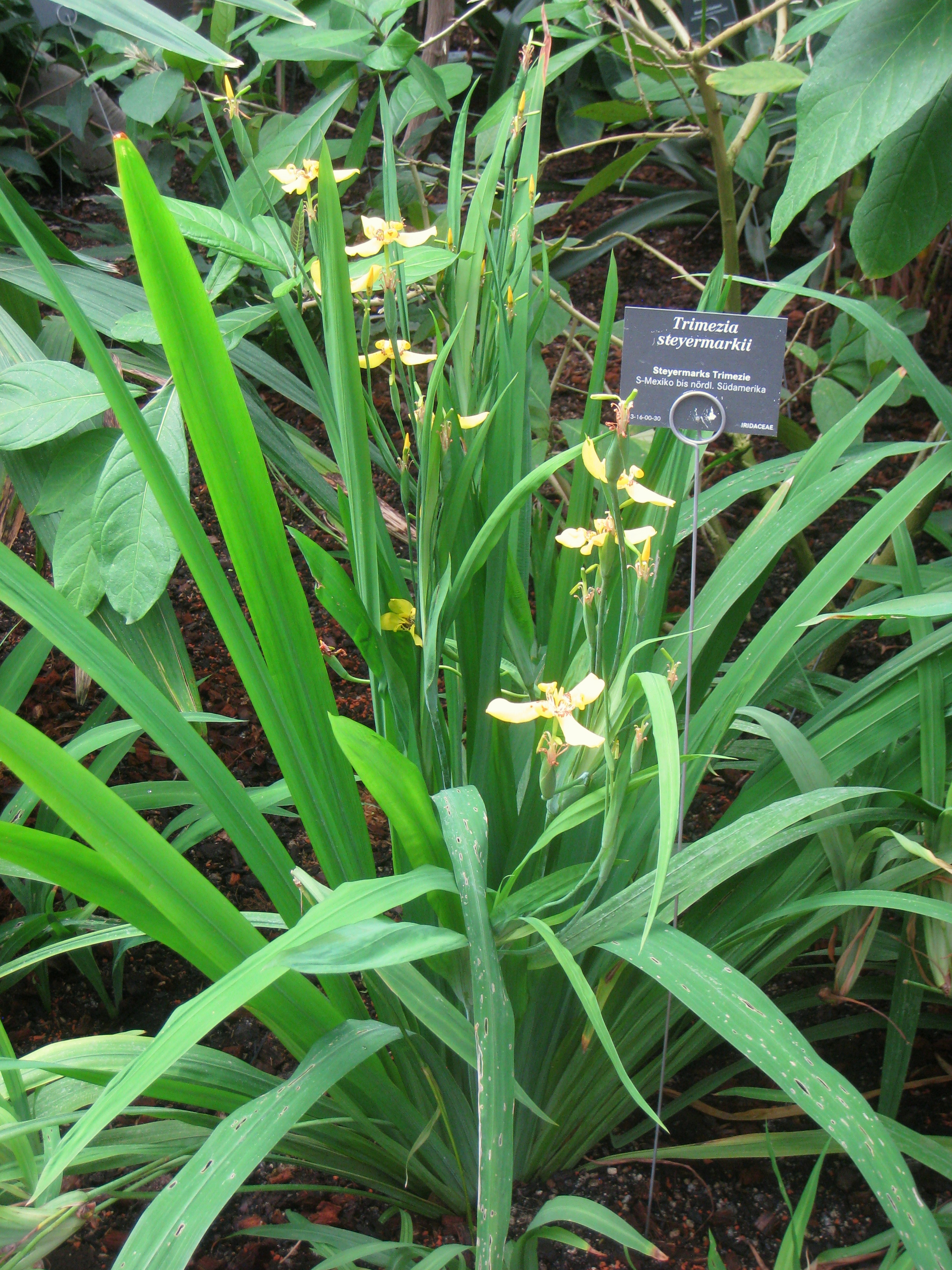
- Trimezia steyermarkii

Scientific classification
- Kingdom: Plantae
- Clade: Embryophytes
- Clade: Tracheophytes
- Clade: Spermatophytes
- Clade: Angiosperms
- Clade: Monocots
- Order: Asparagales
- Family: Iridaceae
- Subfamily: Iridoideae
- Tribe: Trimezieae
- Genus: Trimezia; Salisb. ex Herb.

Type species
- Trimezia meridensis Herb.

Synonyms
- Anomalostylus R.C.Foster; Cypella Klatt; Deluciris A.Gil & Lovo; Galathea Liebm.; Lansbergia de Vriese; Marica Ker Gawl.; Neomarica Sprague; Poarchon Allemão; Pseudiris Chukr & A.Gil; Pseudotrimezia R.C.Foster; Remaclea C.Morren; Xanthocromyon H.Karst.

= Trimezia =

Genus of flowering plants

Trimezia is a genus of flowering plants in the family Iridaceae, native to the warmer parts of southern Mexico, Central America, South America, Florida, and the West Indies. Trimezia is placed in the tribe Trimezieae. The division of the tribe into genera has varied considerably. In one approach, it contains only the genus Trimezia, which then includes the genera Neomarica, Pseudotrimezia and Pseudiris. In other approaches, two to five genera are recognized, sometimes also including the genus Deluciris.

The English names walking iris, apostle's iris and apostle plant have been used for many species, regardless of the generic placement (e.g. for Trimezia gracilis, syn. Neomarica gracilis). New plantlets form at the end of the flower spikes; after flowering, the spikes fall over and a new plant grows, so the plant "walks". Names including "apostle" refer to the incorrect belief that plants do not flower until 12 or more leaves are present.

== Description ==
The rootstock is variously described as an elongated corm or a rhizome. Plants vary in height from about 7 cm (2.8 in) in the case of T. pusilla to 1.6 m (5.2 ft) in the case of T. spathata subsp. sincorana. Linear to lanceolate leaves grow from the base of the plant. Most species have flowers in some shade of yellow. The six tepals are arranged in two series. The outer tepals (sepals) are larger than the inner ones (petals); both may have brown-purple markings at the base. The stamens have free filaments (i.e. they not fused together or fused to the style). The style is divided into three branches, each of which usually has two lobes.

== Taxonomy ==
The genus Trimezia was first published with an appropriate description by William Herbert in 1844. Herbert attributed the name to Salisbury, whose use he described as "absque charactere" ('without character'). The genus name is derived from the Greek words τρεῖς, treis, meaning 'three' and μείζων, meizon, meaning 'greater', referring to the outer three tepals being much larger than the inner three.

Trimezia is placed in the tribe Trimezieae of the subfamily Iridoideae. The number of genera into which the tribe is divided has varied considerably. Three genera were used before 2008: Trimezia, Neomarica and Pseudotrimezia. Some sources used all three; others combined Trimezia and Neomarica but retained Pseudotrimezia. A further genus, Pseudiris, was published in 2008. Molecular phylogenetic studies have shown that although the tribe is monophyletic, the genera as traditionally used, based on morphological characteristics, are not. Three of the four main clades found in these analyses combine species from more than one genus. One response to these findings, adopted as of February 2025 by Plants of the World Online, is to combine genera; thus Deluciris, Neomarica, Pseudiris and Pseudotrimezia are all placed within Trimezia. An alternative approach, retaining the traditional genera but with changed circumscriptions, was put forward in 2018; an additional new genus, Deluciris, was also created within the tribe.

Examples of alternative divisions of Trimezieae
Ravenna (2003)	Chukr & Giulietti (2008)	Gil & al. (2009)	Lovo & al. (2018)	PoWO (February 2025)
Trimezia	Trimezia	Trimezia	Trimezia	Trimezia
Trimezia	Neomarica	Neomarica	Neomarica	Trimezia
Pseudotrimezia	Pseudotrimezia	Pseudotrimezia	Pseudotrimezia	Trimezia
		Pseudiris	Pseudiris	Trimezia
			Deluciris	Trimezia

=== Distinction between genera ===
When Trimezia was distinguished from Neomarica prior to molecular phylogenetic studies, i.e. entirely on morphological grounds, some vegetative characters were considered diagnostic. Trimezia in this sense always grows from corms, Neomarica almost always from rhizomes. Trimezia has flowering stems (scapes) that are circular in cross-section, whereas Neomarica has flattened scapes. Lovo et al. (2018) consider these characteristics to be among those distinguishing their circumscription of Neomarica from the other genera into which they divide the tribe.

=== Species ===
As of February 2025, Plants of the World Online accepted about 80 species of Trimezia. However, this includes species that other sources place in different genera in the tribe Trimezieae. The placement in Lovo et al. (2018), where given in their paper, is shown in the second column.

PoWO (February 2025)	Lovo et al. (2018)
Trimezia altivallis Ravenna – Brazil (Espírito Santo)	Neomarica altivallis
Trimezia barretoi (R.C.Foster) Christenh. & Byng – Brazil (Minas Gerais)	Pseudotrimezia barretoi
Trimezia brachypus (Baker) Ravenna – Brazil (Bahia)	Neomarica brachypus
Trimezia brevicaulis Ravenna – Brazil (Bahia, Minas Gerais)	Trimezia brevicaulis
Trimezia brevistaminea (Chukr) Christenh. & Byng – Brazil (Minas Gerais: Serra do Cipó)	Pseudotrimezia brevistaminea
Trimezia campanula Lovo & Mello-Silva – Brazil (Minas Gerais)	Trimezia campanula
Trimezia candida (Hassl.) Ravenna – SE. & S. Brazil to NE. Argentina	Neomarica candida
Trimezia capitellata Ravenna – Brazil (Minas Gerais)	Trimezia capitellata
Trimezia castaneomaculata (A.Gil & M.C.E.Amaral) Christenh. & Byng – Brazil (Bahia, Espírito Santo)	Neomarica castaneomaculata
Trimezia cathartica (Klatt) Niederl. – Brazil (Bahia, Minas Gerais, Goiás)	Pseudotrimezia cathartica
Trimezia caulosa Ravenna – Brazil (Bahia)	Trimezia caulosa
Trimezia chimantensis Steyerm. – S. Venezuela (Macizo del Chimantá)	Trimezia chimantensis
Trimezia cipoana (Ravenna) Christenh. & Byng – Brazil (Minas Gerais)	Pseudotrimezia sublateralis
Trimezia coerulea (G.Lodd.) Ravenna – SE. & S. Brazil to Paraguay	Neomarica coerulea
Trimezia concava (Ravenna) Christenh. & Byng – Brazil (Minas Gerais)	Pseudotrimezia concava
Trimezia concolor Christenh. & Byng – Brazil (Minas Gerais: Serra do Cipó)	–
Trimezia datensis (Ravenna) Christenh. & Byng – Brazil (Minas Gerais)	–
Trimezia decora Ravenna – Brazil (São Paulo)	Neomarica decora
Trimezia decumbens Ravenna – Brazil (São Paulo)	Neomarica decumbens
Trimezia diamantinensis (Ravenna) Christenh. – Brazil (Minas Gerais)	Pseudotrimezia diamantinensis
Trimezia eburnea (A.Gil & M.C.E.Amaral) Christenh. & Byng – Brazil (Bahia)	Neomarica eburnea
Trimezia elegans (Ravenna) Christenh. – Brazil (Minas Gerais: Pico Itambé)	Pseudotrimezia elegans
Trimezia exillima Ravenna – Brazil (Minas Gerais)	Trimezia exillima
Trimezia fistulosa R.C.Foster – Brazil (Minas Gerais: Serra do Cipó)	Pseudotrimezia fistulosa
Trimezia floscella (A.Gil & M.C.E.Amaral) Christenh. & Byng – Brazil (Bahia)	Neomarica floscella
Trimezia fosteriana Steyerm. – Venezuela (Bolívar)	Trimezia fosteriana
Trimezia fulva (Ravenna) Christenh. & Byng – Brazil (Minas Gerais)	Pseudotrimezia fulva
Trimezia glauca (Seub. ex Klatt) Ravenna – SE. & S. Brazil	Neomarica glauca
Trimezia gracilis (Herb.) Christenh. & Byng – WC. & SE. Brazil to Paraguay	Neomarica gracilis
Trimezia guaricana Ravenna – Venezuela (Guárico)	–
Trimezia guianensis Ravenna – Guyana	–
Trimezia humilis (Klatt) Ravenna – Venezuela, SE. & S. Brazil	Neomarica humilis
Trimezia imbricata (Hand.-Mazz.) Christenh. & Byng – SE. Brazil	Neomarica imbricata
Trimezia involuta (A.Gil & M.C.E.Amaral) Christenh. & Byng – Brazil (Bahia, Espírito Santo)	Neomarica involuta
Trimezia itacambirae (Ravenna) Christenh. & Byng – Brazil (Minas Gerais: Serra do Alagoas)	–
Trimezia itamarajuensis Ravenna – Brazil (Bahia: Itamaraju)	–
Trimezia itatiaica Ravenna – Brazil (Rio de Janeiro)	Neomarica itatiaica
Trimezia jaguatirica Ravenna – Brazil (Minas Gerais)	–
Trimezia juncifolia (Klatt) Benth. & Hook.f. – C. & S. Brazil	Pseudotrimezia juncifolia
Trimezia laevis (Ravenna) Christenh. & Byng – Brazil (Minas Gerais)	Pseudotrimezia pauli
Trimezia latifolia Ravenna – Brazil (Paraná)	Neomarica latifolia
Trimezia liebmannii Govaerts. – Brazil (Rio de Janeiro to Paraná)	–
Trimezia longifolia (Link & Otto) Christenh. & Byng – SE. Brazil	Neomarica longifolia
Trimezia martinicensis (Jacq.) Herb. – C. America to Colombia, Lesser Antilles to Bolivia	Trimezia martinicensis
Trimezia mauroi (A.Gil & M.C.E.Amaral) Govaerts. – Brazil (Rio de Janeiro)	Neomarica mauroi
Trimezia mogolensis Ravenna – Brazil (Minas Gerais)	–
Trimezia monticola (Klatt) Christenh. & Byng – Brazil (Minas Gerais: Pico do Itambé)	–
Trimezia nana (Lovo & Mello-Silva) Christenh. & Byng – Brazil (Minas Gerais)	Pseudotrimezia nana
Trimezia northiana (Schneev.) Ravenna – Brazil (Espírito Santo to Paraná)	Neomarica northiana
Trimezia organensis Ravenna – Brazil (Rio de Janeiro)	incertae sedis
Trimezia paradoxa Ravenna – Brazil (Maranhão)	incertae sedis
Trimezia pardina Ravenna – Brazil (Minas Gerais, Rio de Janeiro)	Neomarica pardina
Trimezia plicatifolia Chukr – Brazil (Minas Gerais: Serra do Cabral)	Pseudotrimezia plicatifolia
Trimezia portosecurensis Ravenna – Brazil (Bahia)	Neomarica portosecurensis
Trimezia pumila (Ravenna) Christenh. & Byng – Brazil (Minas Gerais)	Pseudotrimezia pumila
Trimezia pusilla Ravenna – Brazil (Goiás: Serra Dourada)	Pseudotrimezia pusilla
Trimezia recurvata (Ravenna) Christenh. & Byng – Brazil (Minas Gerais)	Pseudotrimezia recurvata
Trimezia rotundata Ravenna – Brazil (Paraná)	Trimezia rotundata
Trimezia rupestris Ravenna – Brazil (Minas Gerais)	Deluciris rupestris
Trimezia sabini (Lindl.) Ravenna – E. Brazil	Neomarica sabini
Trimezia sancti-vicentei (A.Gil & M.C.E.Amaral) Govaerts. – Brazil (São Paulo)	Neomarica sancti-vicentei
Trimezia sergipensis (A.Gil & M.C.E.Amaral) Christenh. & Byng – Brazil (Sergipe)	Neomarica sergipensis
Trimezia setacea (Klatt) Christenh. & Byng – Brazil (Minas Gerais: Serra do Cipó)	–
Trimezia silvestris (Vell.) Ravenna – SE. Brazil	Neomarica silvestris
Trimezia sobolifera Ravenna – Florida, Mexico (Veracruz, Oaxaca), Venezuela	Trimezia sobolifera
Trimezia spathata (Klatt) Baker – Brazil to NE. Argentina	Trimezia spathata
Trimezia speciosa (Chukr & A.Gil) Christenh. & Byng – Brazil (Bahia)	Neomarica speciosa
Trimezia steyermarkii R.C.Foster – S. Mexico to NW. Venezuela	Trimezia steyermarkii
Trimezia striata (Lovo & Mello-Silva) Christenh. & Byng – Brazil (Minas Gerais)	Pseudotrimezia striata
Trimezia synandra (Ravenna) Christenh. & Byng – Brazil (Minas Gerais)	Pseudotrimezia synandra
Trimezia tenuissima (Ravenna) Christenh. & Byng – Brazil (Minas Gerais)	Pseudotrimezia tenuissima
Trimezia truncata Ravenna – Brazil (Minas Gerais)	Pseudotrimezia truncata
Trimezia unca Ravenna – Brazil (Bahia)	–
Trimezia variegata (M.Martens & Galeotti) Ravenna – C. & S. Mexico to Panama	Neomarica variegata
Trimezia violacea (Klatt) Ravenna – Brazil (Bahia, Minas Gerais)	Deluciris violacea
Trimezia warmingii (Klatt) Christenh. & Byng – Brazil (Minas Gerais)	–
Trimezia xyridea (Ravenna) Christenh. & Byng – Brazil (Minas Gerais)	Pseudotrimezia planifolia

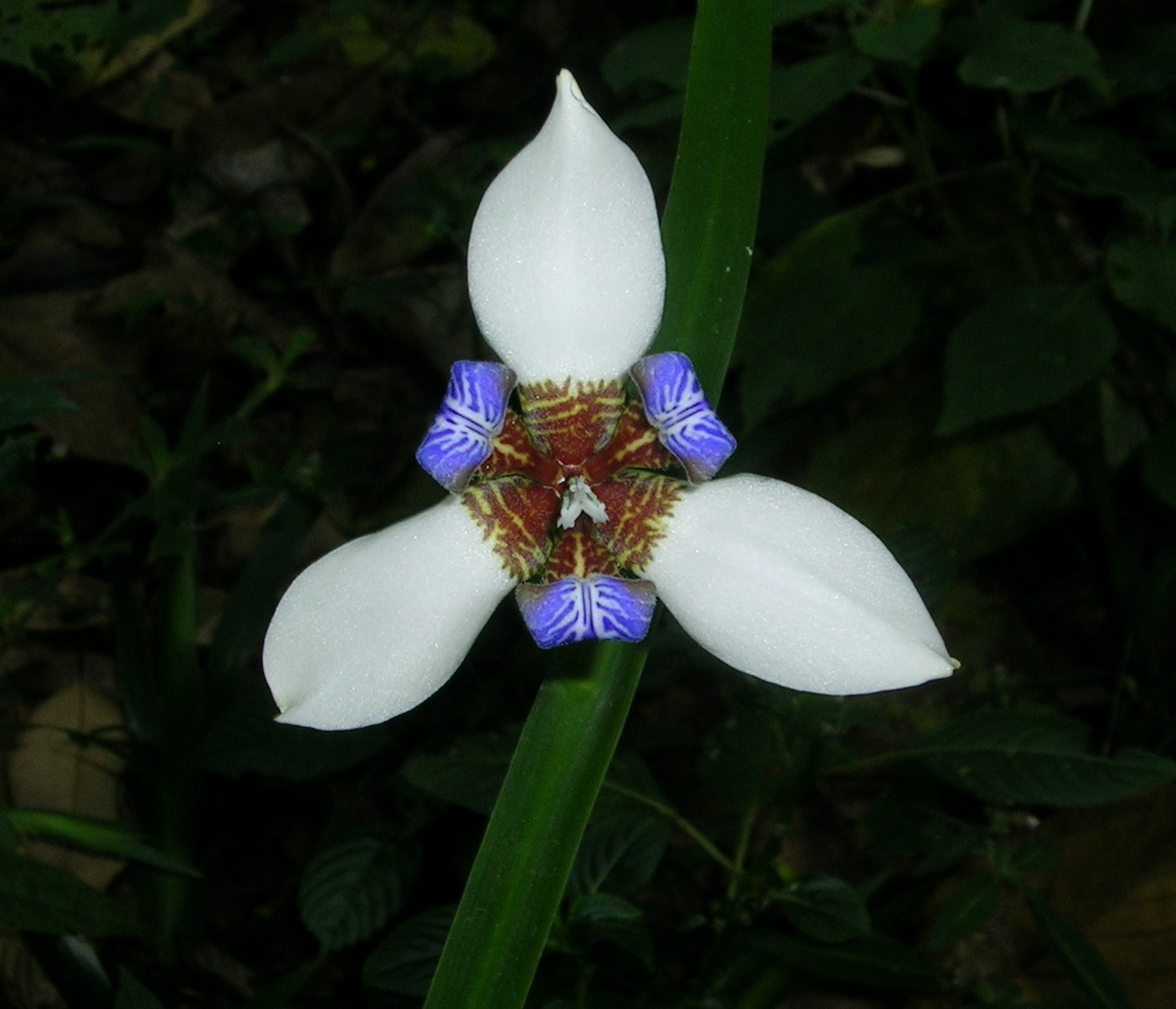
Trimezia candida (syn. Neomarica candida)

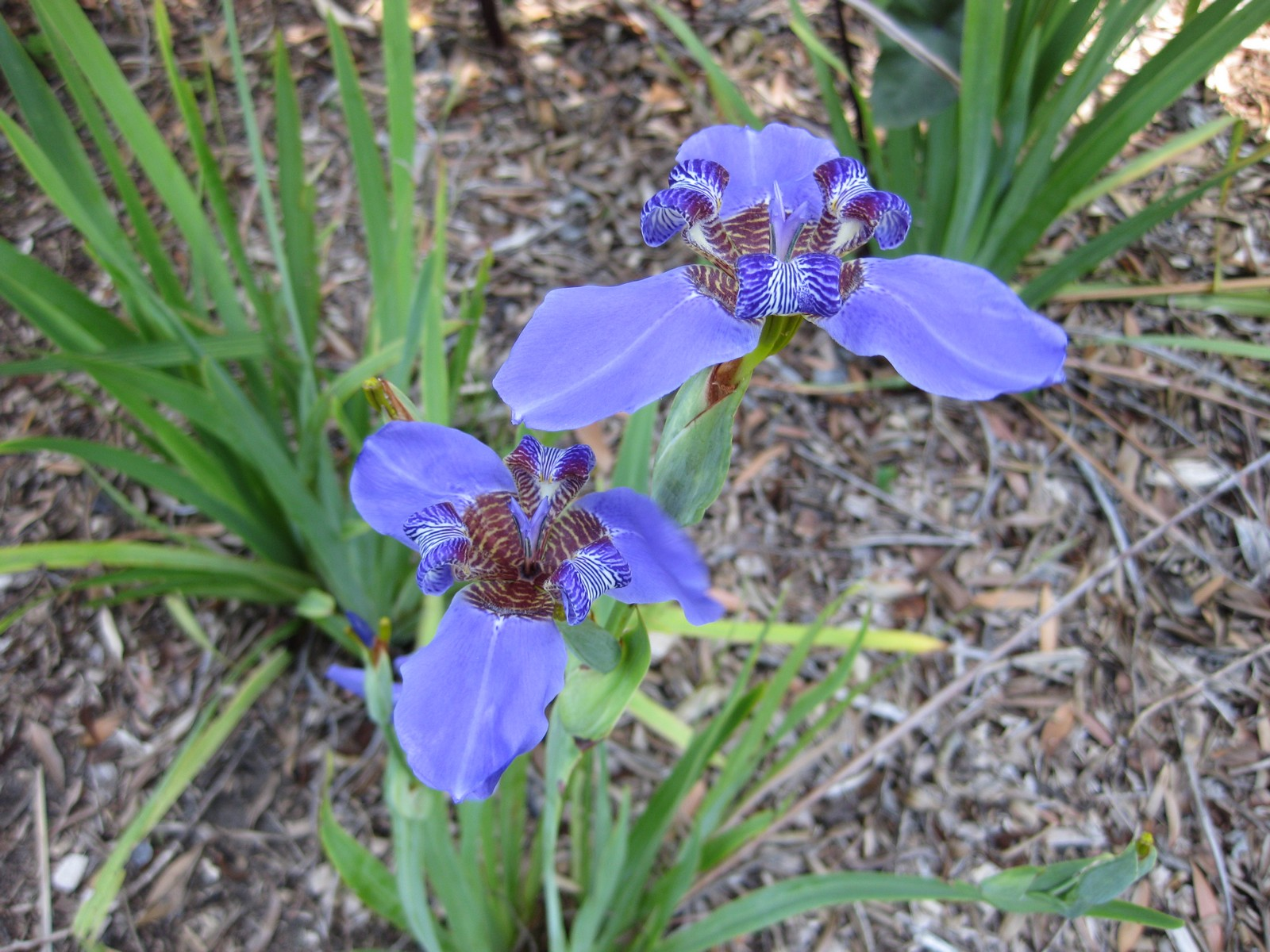
T. coerulea (syn. Neomarica coerulea)

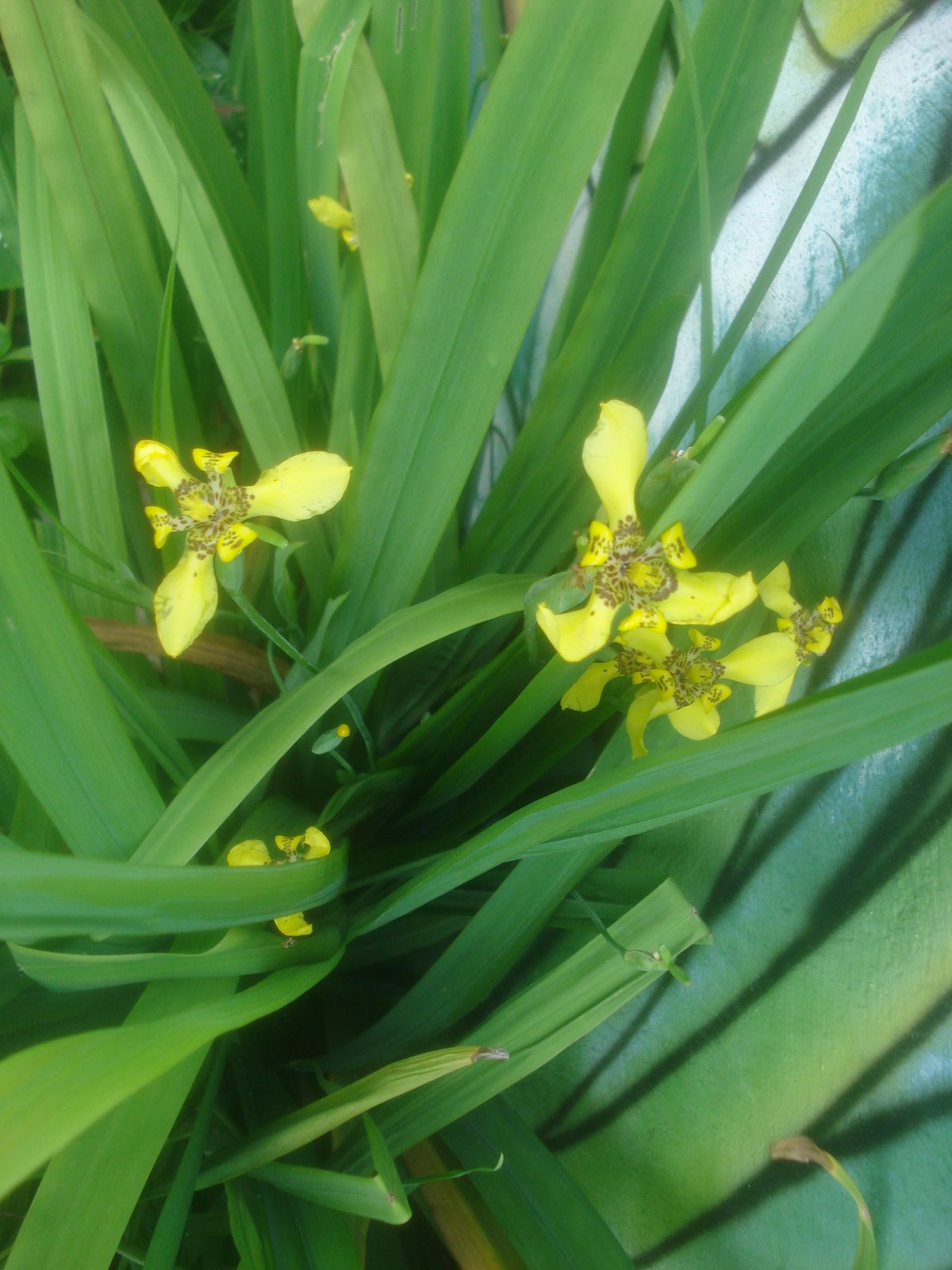
T. fosteriana

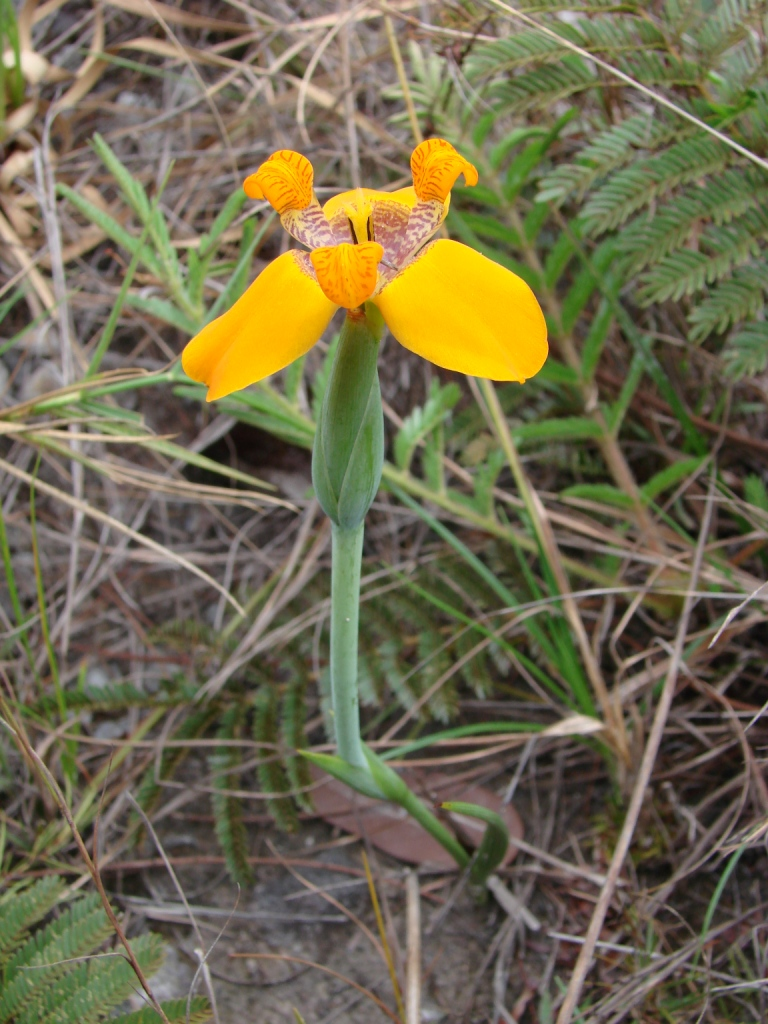
Flower of T. juncifolia (syn. Pseudotrimezia juncifolia)

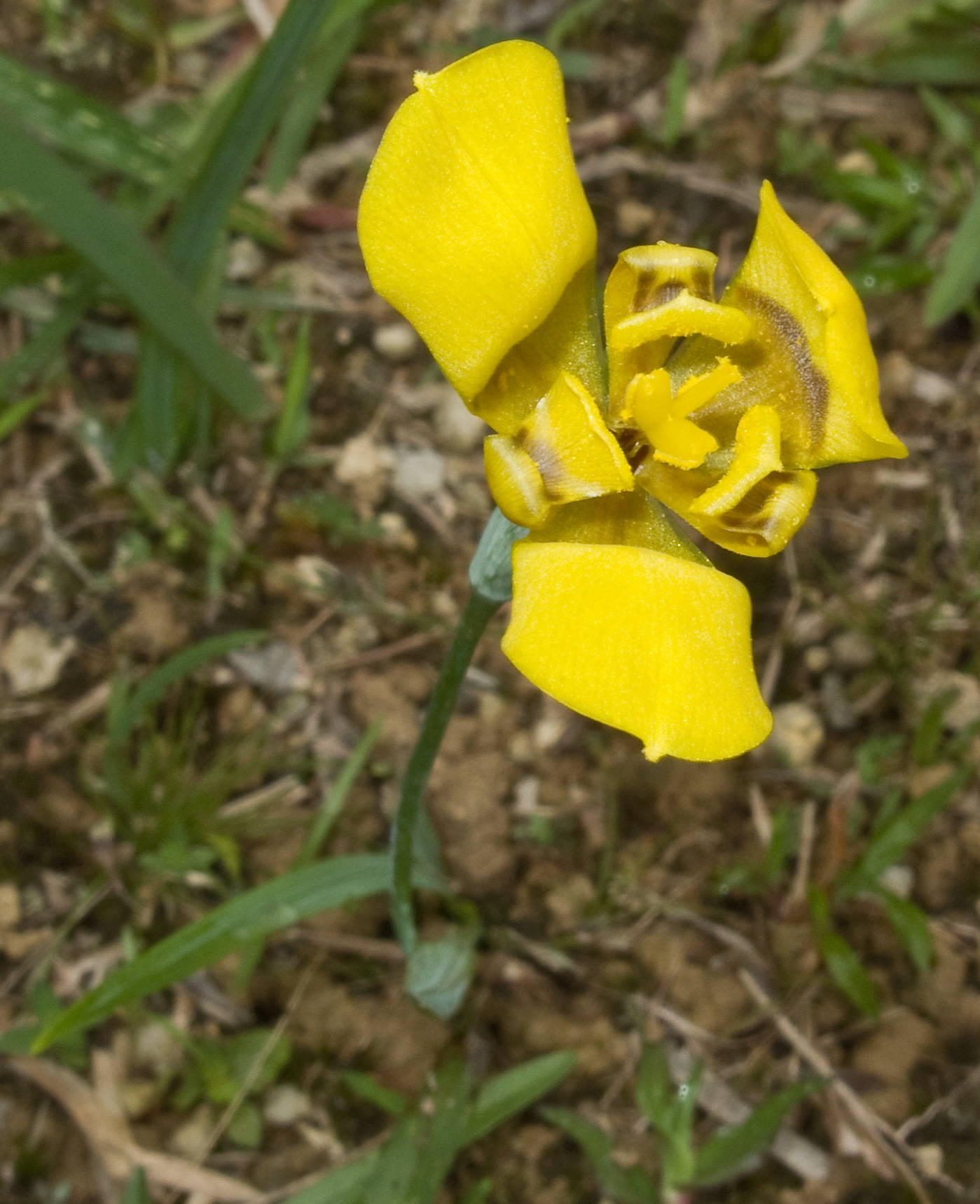
Flower of T. martinicensis, naturalized in Malaysia

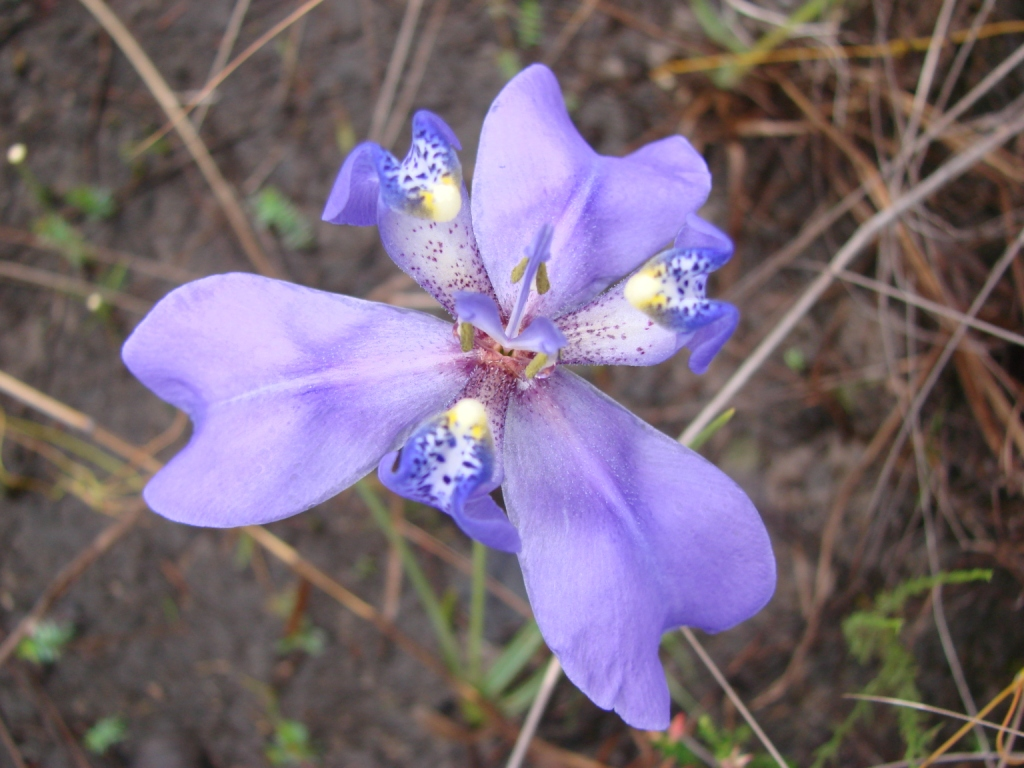
Flower of Trimezia violaceae (syn. Deluciris violacea) in Goiás, Brazil

== Distribution and habitat ==
The genus is native to the warmer parts of southern Mexico, Central America, South America, Florida, and parts of the West Indies. Trimezia species typically grow in damp grassland.
