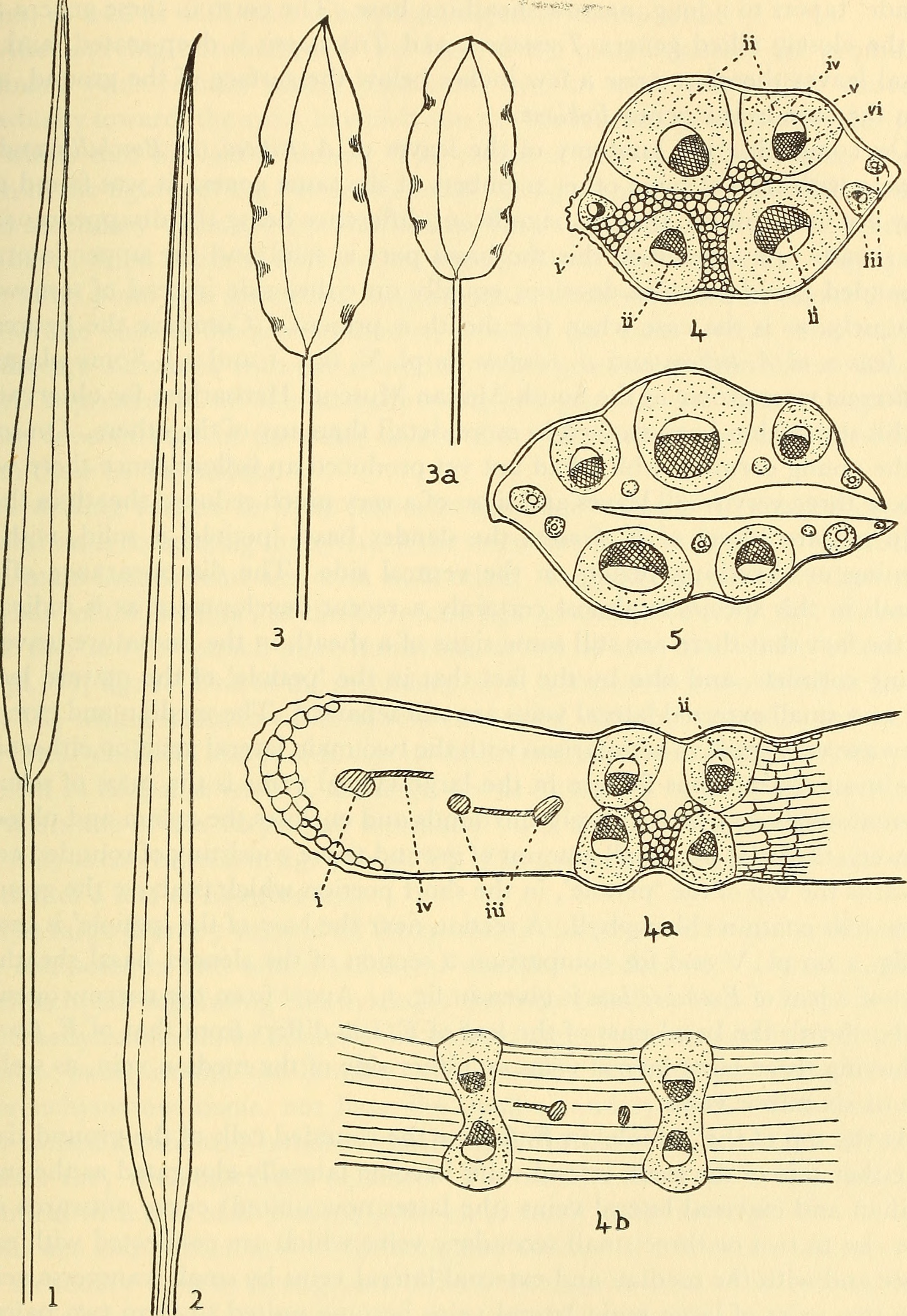

Scientific classification
- Kingdom: Plantae
- Clade: Tracheophytes
- Clade: Angiosperms
- Clade: Monocots
- Order: Asparagales
- Family: Iridaceae
- Genus: Tritoniopsis
- Species: T. lata

Binomial name
- Tritoniopsis lata (L.Bolus) G.J.Lewis, (1959)

Synonyms
- Exohebea lata (L.Bolus) R.C.Foster; Hebea lata L.Bolus

= Tritoniopsis lata =

Species of plant

Tritoniopsis lata is a perennial plant and geophyte belonging to the genus Tritoniopsis and is part of the fynbos. The species is endemic to the Western Cape.
