= Tritoniopsis bicolor =

Scientific classification
- Kingdom: Plantae
- Clade: Tracheophytes
- Clade: Angiosperms
- Clade: Monocots
- Order: Asparagales
- Family: Iridaceae
- Genus: Tritoniopsis
- Species: T. bicolor

Binomial name
- Tritoniopsis bicolor J.C.Manning & Goldblatt, (2001)

Species of plant

Tritoniopsis bicolor is a species of flowering plant in the family Iridaceae. It is a perennial geophyte and is part of the fynbos ecoregion. The species is endemic to the Western Cape and occurs in the Bredasdorp Mountains. It has a range of 120 km^{2} and there are less than ten subpopulations. The plant is threatened by the establishment of vineyards and invasive plants.
