= Tritoniopsis caledonensis =

Scientific classification
- Kingdom: Plantae
- Clade: Tracheophytes
- Clade: Angiosperms
- Clade: Monocots
- Order: Asparagales
- Family: Iridaceae
- Genus: Tritoniopsis
- Species: T. caledonensis

Binomial name
- Tritoniopsis caledonensis (R.C.Foster) G.J.Lewis, (1959)

Synonyms
- Exohebea caledonensis R.C.Foster

Species of plant

Tritoniopsis caledonensis is a perennial plant and geophyte belonging to the genus Tritoniopsis and is part of the fynbos. The species is endemic to the Western Cape and occurs from Houwhoek to Shaw's Mountain. The plant has a range of 1051 km^{2} and there are six subpopulations. The plant has lost its habitat to forestry activities and is currently also threatened by invasive alien plants.
