= Tritoniopsis pulchra =

Scientific classification
- Kingdom: Plantae
- Clade: Tracheophytes
- Clade: Angiosperms
- Clade: Monocots
- Order: Asparagales
- Family: Iridaceae
- Genus: Tritoniopsis
- Species: T. pulchra

Binomial name
- Tritoniopsis pulchra (Baker) Goldblatt, (1990)

Synonyms
- Anapalina pulchra (Schltr.) N.E.Br.; Antholyza pulchra Baker; Homoglossum pulchrum Schltr.

Species of plant

Tritoniopsis pulchra is a perennial plant and geophyte belonging to the genus Tritoniopsis and is part of the fynbos. The species is endemic to the Western Cape.
