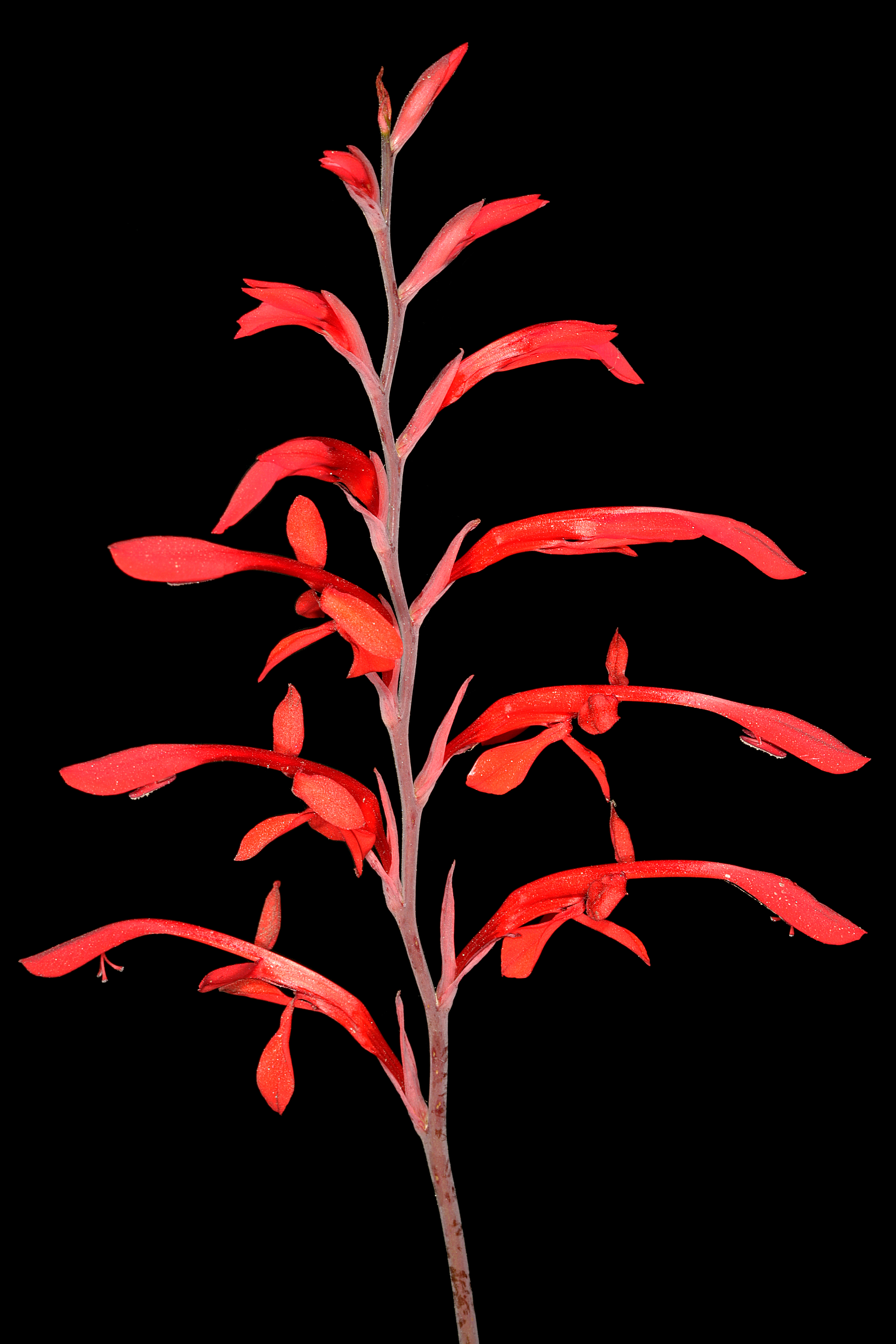

Conservation status
- Least Concern (SANBI Red List)

Scientific classification
- Kingdom: Plantae
- Clade: Tracheophytes
- Clade: Angiosperms
- Clade: Monocots
- Order: Asparagales
- Family: Iridaceae
- Genus: Tritoniopsis
- Species: T. afra

Binomial name
- Tritoniopsis afra (N.E.Br.) Goldblatt & J.C.Manning (2012)

Synonyms
- Anapalina afra (N.E.Br.) G.J.Lewis; Chasmanthe afra N.E.Br.; Petamenes afra (N.E.Br.) E.Phillips

= Tritoniopsis afra =

Species of plant

Tritoniopsis afra, formerly Tritoniopsis caffra, is a species of flowering plant belonging to the genus Tritoniopsis. It is a perennial tuberous geophyte endemic to the Eastern Cape and Western Cape, where it grows in the fynbos.
