= Tritoniopsis flava =

Scientific classification
- Kingdom: Plantae
- Clade: Tracheophytes
- Clade: Angiosperms
- Clade: Monocots
- Order: Asparagales
- Family: Iridaceae
- Genus: Tritoniopsis
- Species: T. flava

Binomial name
- Tritoniopsis flava J.C.Manning & Goldblatt, (2001)

Species of plant

Tritoniopsis flava is a species of flowering plant in the family Iridaceae. It is a perennial geophyte and is part of the fynbos ecoregion. The species is endemic to the Western Cape and occurs at the Kogelberg. The plant is rare and only flowers after fires, it has only been seen twice in the past 10 years. Currently, the species has no threats.
