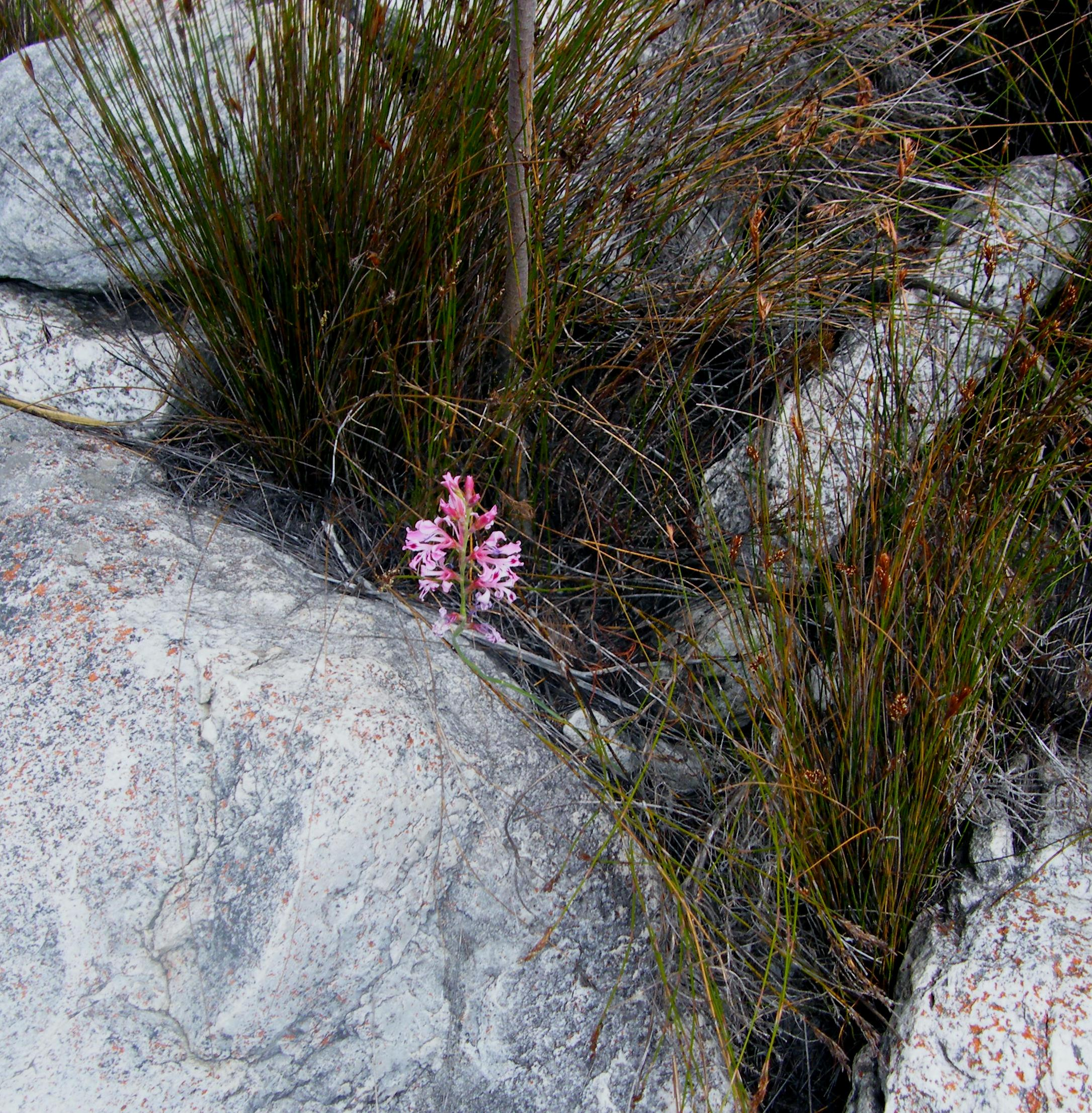

Scientific classification
- Kingdom: Plantae
- Clade: Tracheophytes
- Clade: Angiosperms
- Clade: Monocots
- Order: Asparagales
- Family: Iridaceae
- Genus: Tritoniopsis
- Species: T. pulchella

Binomial name
- Tritoniopsis pulchella G.J.Lewis, (1959)

= Tritoniopsis pulchella =

Species of plant

Tritoniopsis pulchella is a perennial plant and geophyte belonging to the genus Tritoniopsis and is part of the fynbos. The species is endemic to the Western Cape.
