= Tritoniopsis intermedia =

Scientific classification
- Kingdom: Plantae
- Clade: Tracheophytes
- Clade: Angiosperms
- Clade: Monocots
- Order: Asparagales
- Family: Iridaceae
- Genus: Tritoniopsis
- Species: T. intermedia

Binomial name
- Tritoniopsis intermedia (Baker) Goldblatt, (1990)

Synonyms
- Anapalina intermedia (Baker) G.J.Lewis; Antholyza intermedia Baker; Chasmanthe intermedia (Baker) N.E.Br.; Petamenes intermedia (Baker) E.Phillips

Species of plant

Tritoniopsis intermedia is a perennial plant and geophyte belonging to the genus Tritoniopsis and is part of the fynbos. The species is endemic to the Eastern Cape and Western Cape.
