= Tritoniopsis elongata =

Scientific classification
- Kingdom: Plantae
- Clade: Tracheophytes
- Clade: Angiosperms
- Clade: Monocots
- Order: Asparagales
- Family: Iridaceae
- Genus: Tritoniopsis
- Species: T. elongata

Binomial name
- Tritoniopsis elongata (L.Bolus) G.J.Lewis, (1959)

Synonyms
- Exohebea elongata (L.Bolus) R.C.Foster; Hebea elongata L.Bolus

Species of plant

Tritoniopsis elongata is a perennial plant and geophyte belonging to the genus Tritoniopsis and is part of the fynbos. The species is endemic to the Western Cape and occurs from the Elandsberg to Caledon. There are ten fragmented subpopulations, none of which have more than 100 plants. The plant has lost habitat to crop cultivation and suburban development in the Paarl and Wellington areas.
