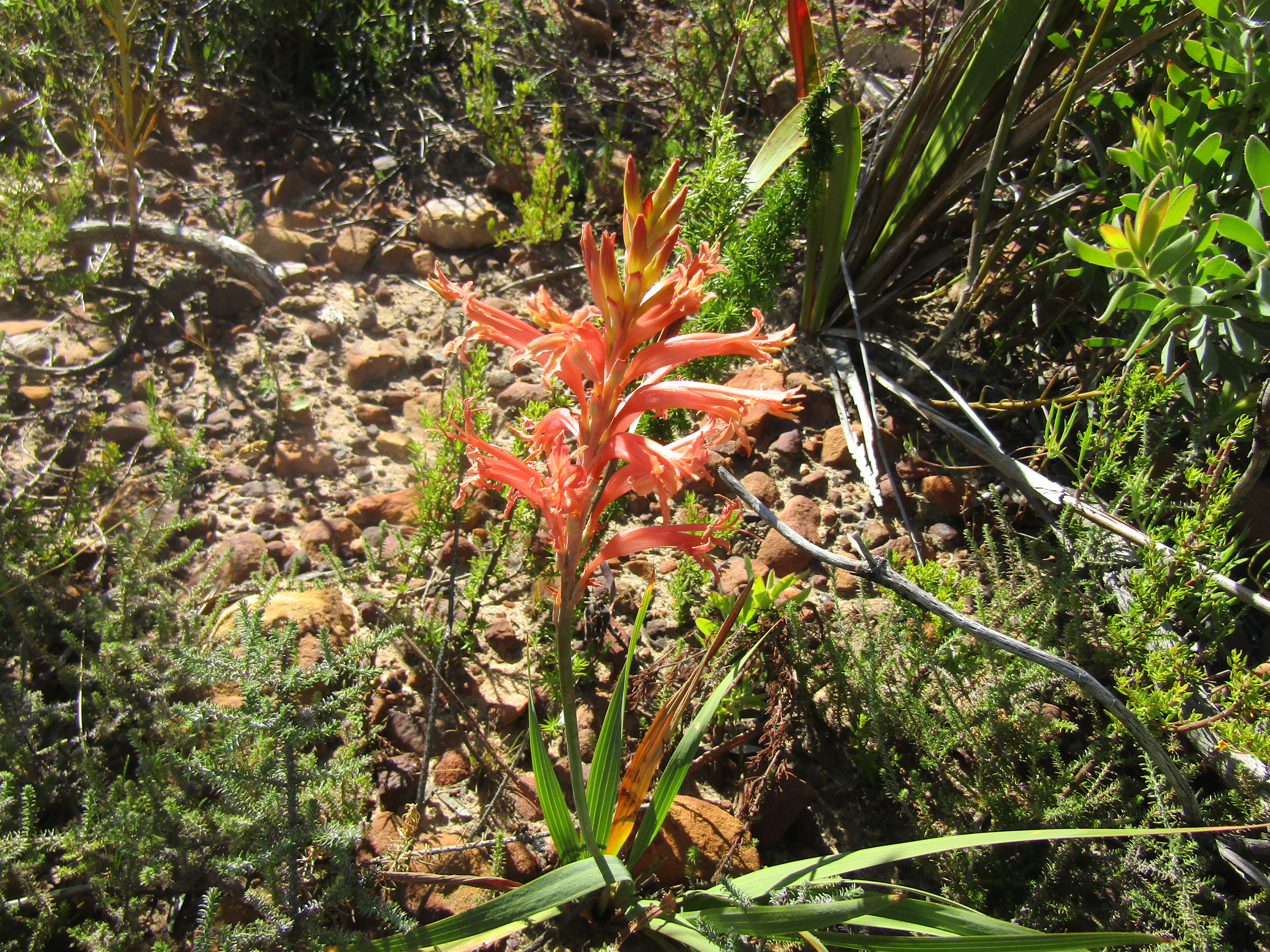

Scientific classification
- Kingdom: Plantae
- Clade: Tracheophytes
- Clade: Angiosperms
- Clade: Monocots
- Order: Asparagales
- Family: Iridaceae
- Genus: Tritoniopsis
- Species: T. antholyza

Binomial name
- Tritoniopsis antholyza (Poir.) Goldblatt

Synonyms
- Gladiolus antholyza Poir.

= Tritoniopsis antholyza =

Species of plant

Tritoniopsis antholyza is a species of plant in the iris family. Its common name is the Karkarbloom or Karkar Reedpipe.

== Range ==
Like others of the genus, it is endemic to the south-western parts of South Africa.
