= Tritoniopsis nervosa =

Scientific classification
- Kingdom: Plantae
- Clade: Tracheophytes
- Clade: Angiosperms
- Clade: Monocots
- Order: Asparagales
- Family: Iridaceae
- Genus: Tritoniopsis
- Species: T. nervosa

Binomial name
- Tritoniopsis nervosa (Baker) G.J.Lewis (1959)

Synonyms
- Ixia nervosa (Baker) Baker; Morphixia nervosa Baker; Tanaosolen nervosus (Baker) G.J.Lewis; Tanaosolen nudus N.E.Br.; Tritonia nervosa (Baker) Klatt

Species of plant

Tritoniopsis nervosa is a perennial plant and geophyte belonging to the genus Tritoniopsis and is part of the fynbos. The species is endemic to the Western Cape.
