= Tritoniopsis toximontana =

Scientific classification
- Kingdom: Plantae
- Clade: Tracheophytes
- Clade: Angiosperms
- Clade: Monocots
- Order: Asparagales
- Family: Iridaceae
- Genus: Tritoniopsis
- Species: T. toximontana

Binomial name
- Tritoniopsis toximontana J.C.Manning & Goldblatt, (2001)

Species of plant

Tritoniopsis toximontana is a species of flowering plant in the family Iridaceae. It is a perennial geophyte and is part of the fynbos ecoregion. The species is endemic to the Western Cape and occurs in the Gifberg and Matsikammaberg. Here the plant has a range of only 17 km^{2}. There is only one population. The plant is not threatened and is considered rare.
