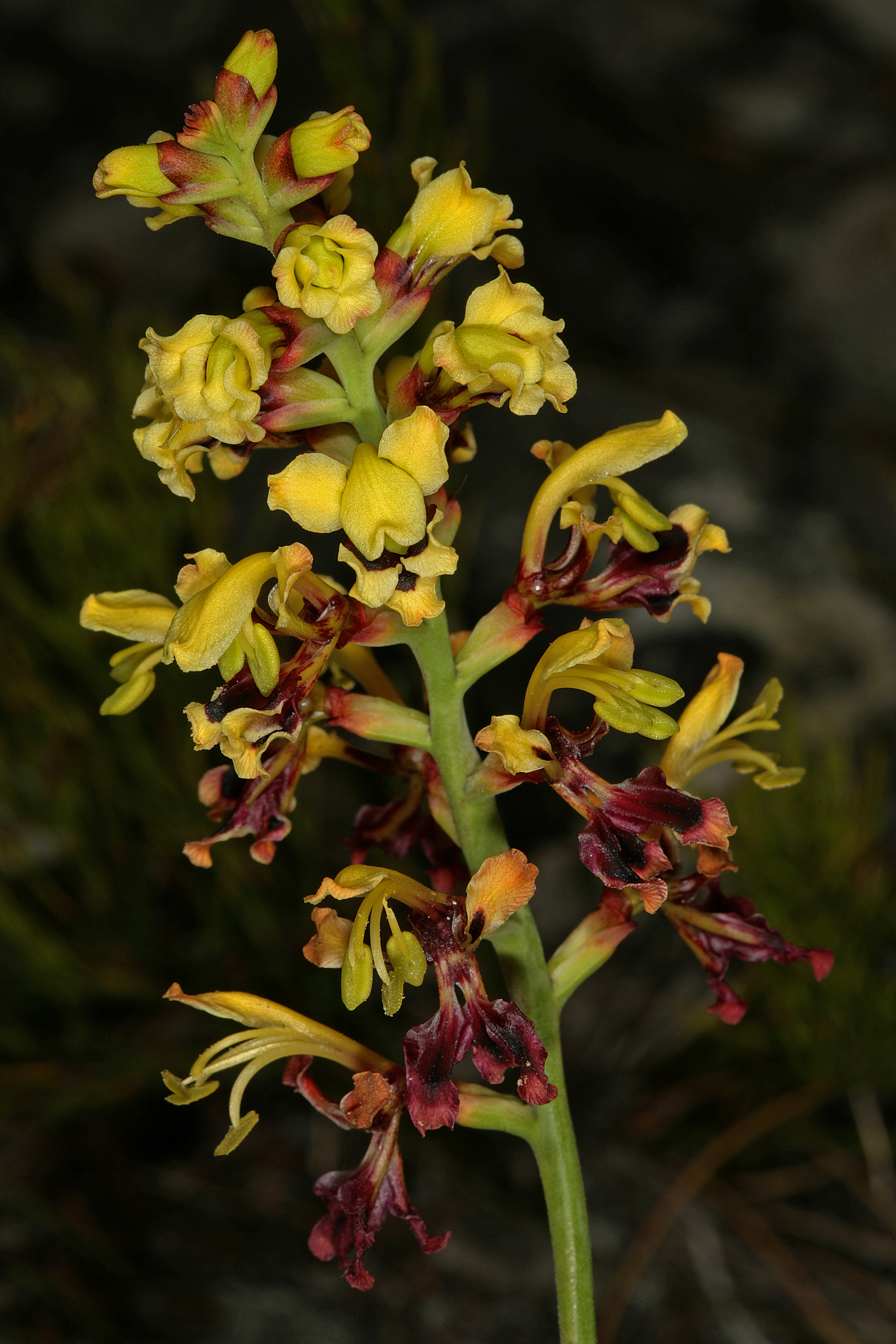

Scientific classification
- Kingdom: Plantae
- Clade: Tracheophytes
- Clade: Angiosperms
- Clade: Monocots
- Order: Asparagales
- Family: Iridaceae
- Genus: Tritoniopsis
- Species: T. parviflora

Binomial name
- Tritoniopsis parviflora (Jacq.) G.J.Lewis, (1959)

Synonyms
- Antholyza montana (L.f.) Ker Gawl.; Exohebea angusta (L.Bolus) R.C.Foster; Exohebea parviflora (Jacq.) R.C.Foster; Gladiolus alatus Burm.f.; Gladiolus montanus L.f.; Gladiolus parviflorus Jacq.; Gladiolus tabularis Pers.; Hebea angusta L.Bolus; Hebea parviflora (Jacq.) L.Bolus; Hebea tabularis Eckl.; Tritoniopsis parviflora var. angusta (L.Bolus) G.J.Lewis

= Tritoniopsis parviflora =

Species of plant

Tritoniopsis parviflora is a perennial plant and geophyte belonging to the genus Tritoniopsis and is part of the fynbos. The species is endemic to the Western Cape.
