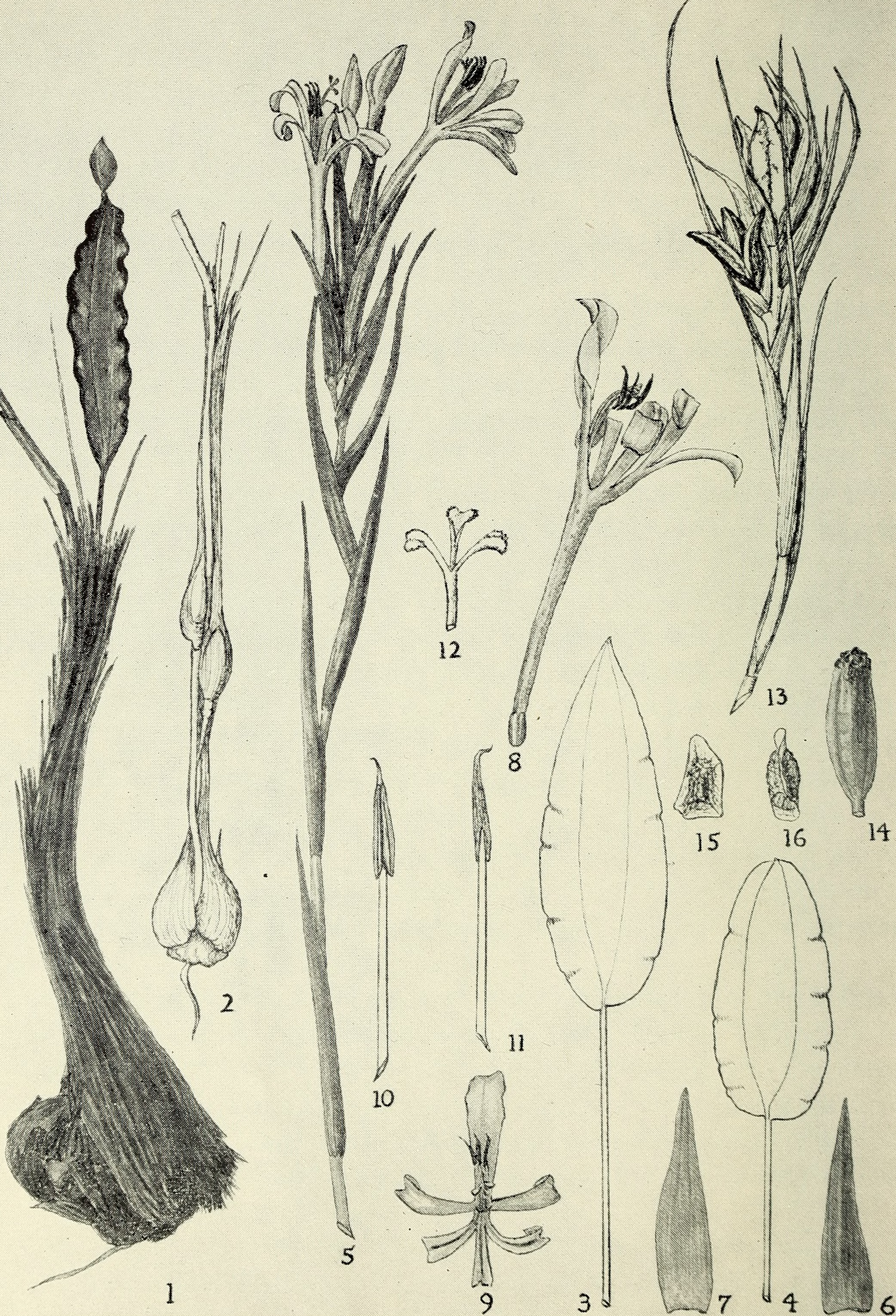

Scientific classification
- Kingdom: Plantae
- Clade: Tracheophytes
- Clade: Angiosperms
- Clade: Monocots
- Order: Asparagales
- Family: Iridaceae
- Genus: Tritoniopsis
- Species: T. flexuosa

Binomial name
- Tritoniopsis flexuosa (L.f.) G.J.Lewis, (1959)

Synonyms
- Exohebea flexuosa (L.f.) G.J.Lewis; Gladiolus flexuosus L.f.

= Tritoniopsis flexuosa =

Species of plant

Tritoniopsis flexuosa is a perennial plant and geophyte belonging to the genus Tritoniopsis and is part of the fynbos and renosterveld. The species is endemic to the Western Cape and occurs from Shaw's Mountain to the Agulhas Plain. The plant has an area of occurrence of 434 km^{2} and there are three subpopulations. The plant has lost its habitat to crop cultivation and invasive plants.
