= Tritoniopsis burchellii =

Scientific classification
- Kingdom: Plantae
- Clade: Tracheophytes
- Clade: Angiosperms
- Clade: Monocots
- Order: Asparagales
- Family: Iridaceae
- Genus: Tritoniopsis
- Species: T. burchellii

Binomial name
- Tritoniopsis burchellii (N.E.Br.) Goldblatt, (1990)

Synonyms
- Anapalina burchellii (N.E.Br.) N.E.Br.; Antholyza burchellii N.E.Br.

Species of plant

Tritoniopsis burchellii is a perennial plant and geophyte belonging to the genus Tritoniopsis and is part of the fynbos. The species is endemic to the Western Cape. The plant is named after the English botanist William John Burchell.
