= Tritoniopsis latifolia =

Scientific classification
- Kingdom: Plantae
- Clade: Tracheophytes
- Clade: Angiosperms
- Clade: Monocots
- Order: Asparagales
- Family: Iridaceae
- Genus: Tritoniopsis
- Species: T. latifolia

Binomial name
- Tritoniopsis latifolia G.J.Lewis, (1959)

Species of plant

Tritoniopsis latifolia is a perennial plant and geophyte belonging to the genus Tritoniopsis and is part of the fynbos. The species is endemic to the Western Cape and occurs in the northern Cederberg. The plant has a range of 20 km^{2} and only two subpopulations are known. The plant is not threatened and is considered rare.
