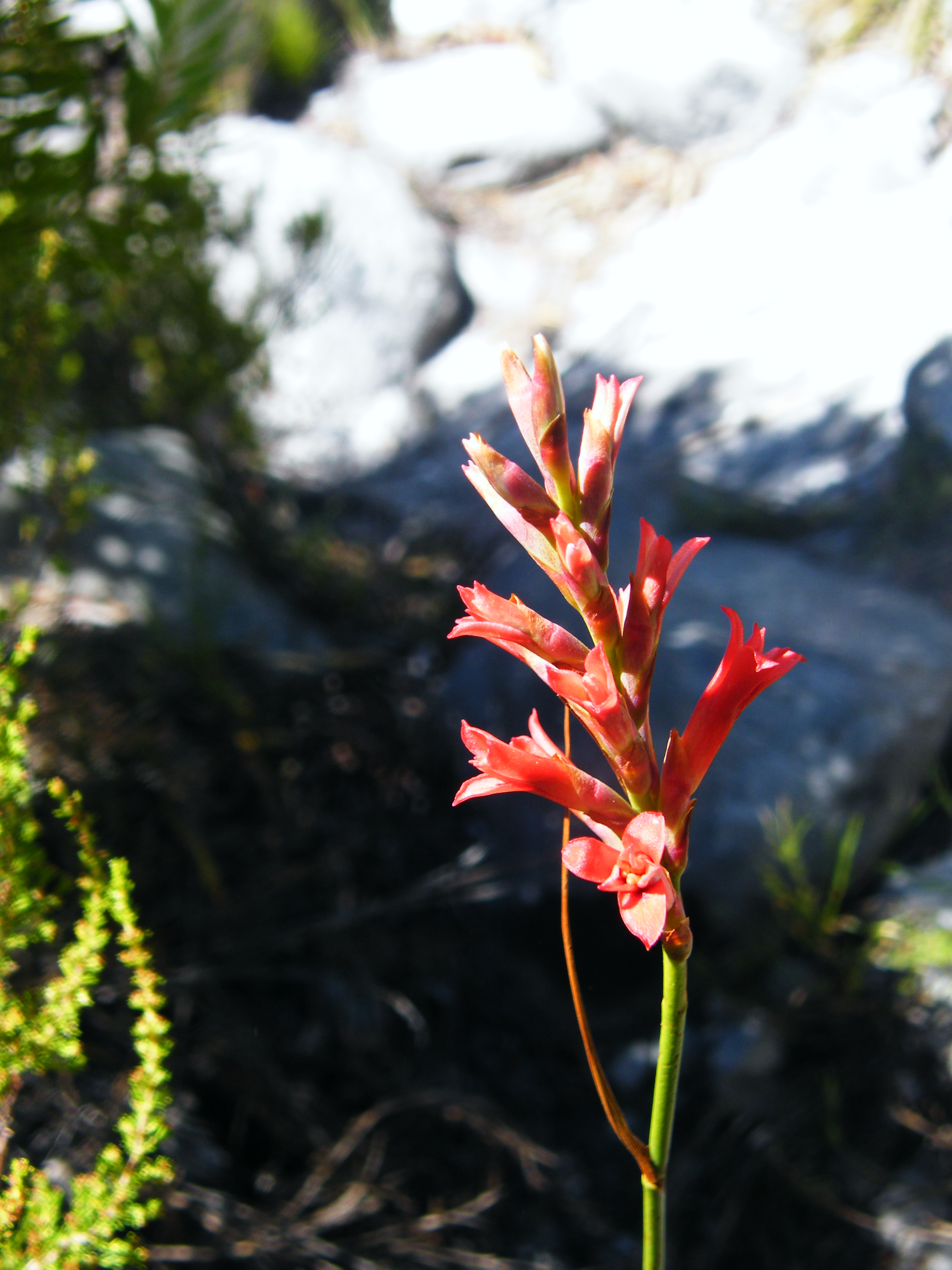

Scientific classification
- Kingdom: Plantae
- Clade: Tracheophytes
- Clade: Angiosperms
- Clade: Monocots
- Order: Asparagales
- Family: Iridaceae
- Genus: Tritoniopsis
- Species: T. triticea

Binomial name
- Tritoniopsis triticea (Burm.f.) Goldblatt, (1990)

Synonyms
- Anapalina burchellii (N.E.Br.) N.E.Br.; Anapalina triticea (Burm.f.) N.E.Br.; Antholyza burchellii N.E.Br.; Antholyza lucidior L.f.; Antholyza triticea (Burm.f.) N.E.Br.; Gladiolus lucidior (L.f.) Baker; Homoglossum lucidior (L.f.) Baker; Ixia triticea Burm.f.; Tritoniopsis burchellii (N.E.Br.) Goldblatt; Watsonia lucens Pers.; Watsonia lucidior (L.f.) Eckl.; Watsonia tigrina Eckl.

= Tritoniopsis triticea =

Species of plant

Tritoniopsis triticea, the summer snake flower or mountain pipes, is a perennial plant and geophyte belonging to the genus Tritoniopsis and is part of the fynbos. The species is endemic to the Western Cape.
