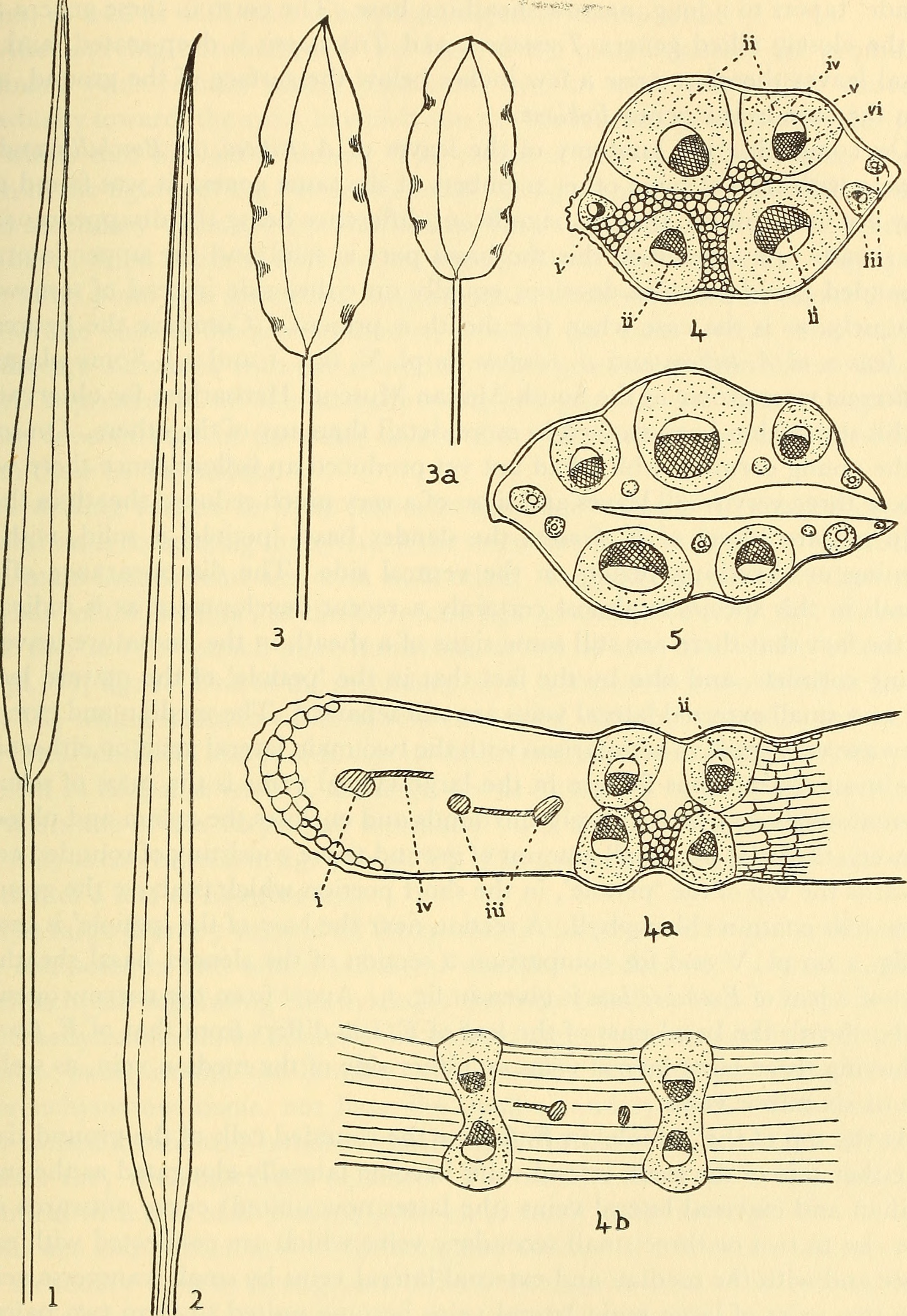

Scientific classification
- Kingdom: Plantae
- Clade: Tracheophytes
- Clade: Angiosperms
- Clade: Monocots
- Order: Asparagales
- Family: Iridaceae
- Genus: Tritoniopsis
- Species: T. revoluta

Binomial name
- Tritoniopsis revoluta (Burm.f.) Goldblatt, (1992)

Synonyms
- Anapalina revoluta (Burm.f.) N.E.Br.; Antholyza revoluta Burm.f.; Exohebea apiculata (F.Bolus) R.C.Foster; Gladiolus apiculatus F.Bolus; Hebea apiculata (F.Bolus) L.Bolus; Homoglossum revolutum (Burm.f.) Baker; Tritoniopsis apiculata (F.Bolus) G.J.Lewis

= Tritoniopsis revoluta =

Species of plant

Tritoniopsis revoluta is a perennial plant and geophyte belonging to the genus Tritoniopsis and is part of the fynbos. The species is endemic to the Western Cape.
