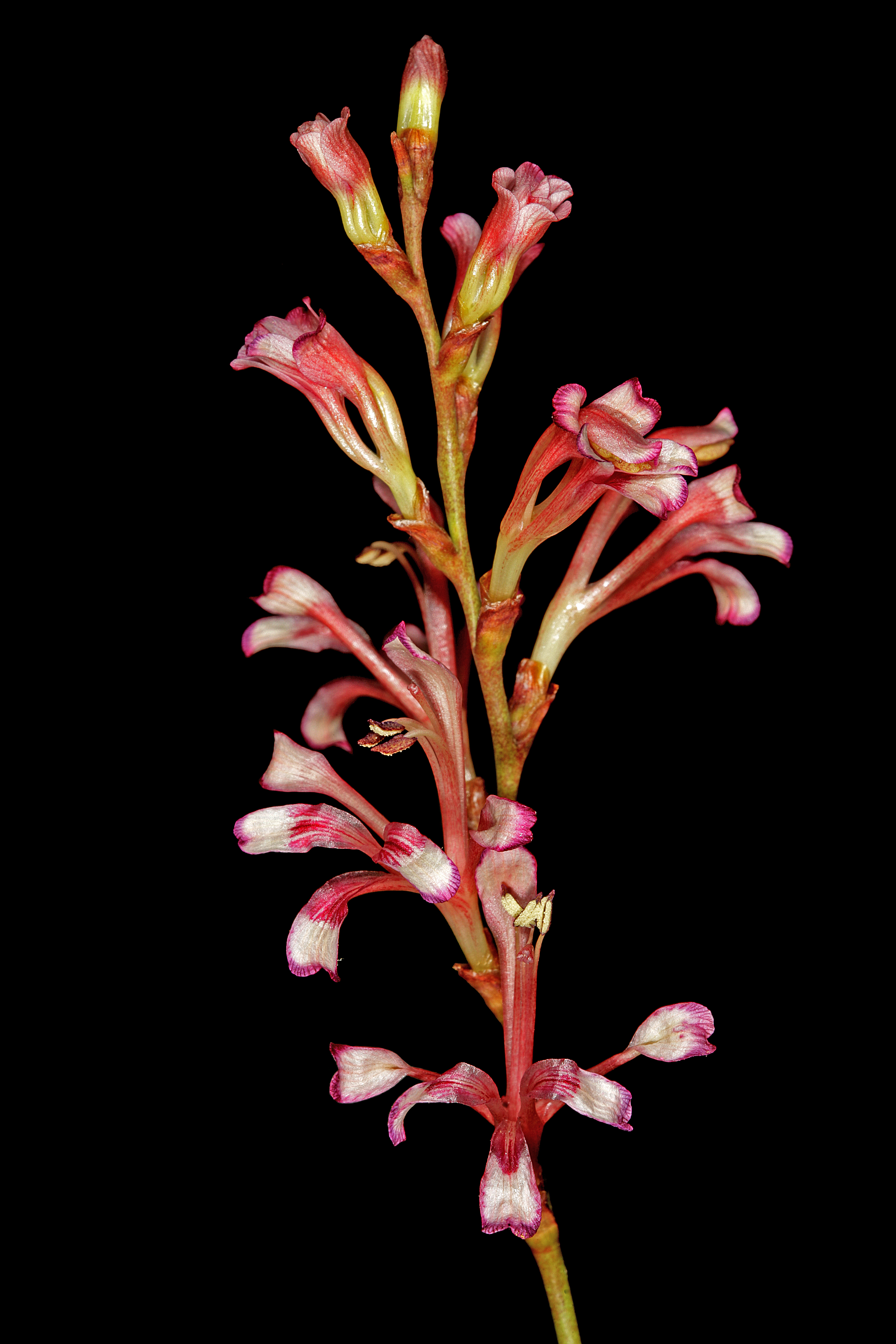

Scientific classification
- Kingdom: Plantae
- Clade: Tracheophytes
- Clade: Angiosperms
- Clade: Monocots
- Order: Asparagales
- Family: Iridaceae
- Genus: Tritoniopsis
- Species: T. dodii

Binomial name
- Tritoniopsis dodii (G.J.Lewis) G.J.Lewis, (1959)

Synonyms
- Exohebea dodii (G.J.Lewis) R.C.Foster; Hebea dodii G.J.Lewis

= Tritoniopsis dodii =

Species of plant

Tritoniopsis dodii is a perennial plant and geophyte belonging to the genus Tritoniopsis and is part of the fynbos. The species is endemic to the Western Cape and occurs from the Cape Peninsula to beyond Cape Agulhas.
