= Tritoniopsis cinnamomea =

Scientific classification
- Kingdom: Plantae
- Clade: Tracheophytes
- Clade: Angiosperms
- Clade: Monocots
- Order: Asparagales
- Family: Iridaceae
- Genus: Tritoniopsis
- Species: T. cinnamomea

Binomial name
- Tritoniopsis cinnamomea J.C.Manning & Goldblatt, (2015)

Species of plant

Tritoniopsis cinnamomea is a species of flowering plant in the family Iridaceae. It is a perennial geophyte and is part of the fynbos ecoregion. The species is endemic to the Western Cape and occurs at the Piketberg.
