= Tritoniopsis nemorosa =

Scientific classification
- Kingdom: Plantae
- Clade: Tracheophytes
- Clade: Angiosperms
- Clade: Monocots
- Order: Asparagales
- Family: Iridaceae
- Genus: Tritoniopsis
- Species: T. nemorosa

Binomial name
- Tritoniopsis nemorosa (E.Mey. ex Klatt) G.J.Lewis, (1959)

Synonyms
- Antholyza nemorosa E.Mey. ex Klatt; Exohebea nemorosa (E.Mey. ex Klatt) R.C.Foster; Gladiolus nemorosus (E.Mey. ex Klatt) N.E.Br.; Hebea nemorosa (E.Mey. ex Klatt) L.Bolus; Schweiggera nemorosa E.Mey. ex Baker

Species of plant

Tritoniopsis nemorosa is a perennial plant and geophyte belonging to the genus Tritoniopsis and is part of the fynbos. The species is endemic to the Western Cape.
