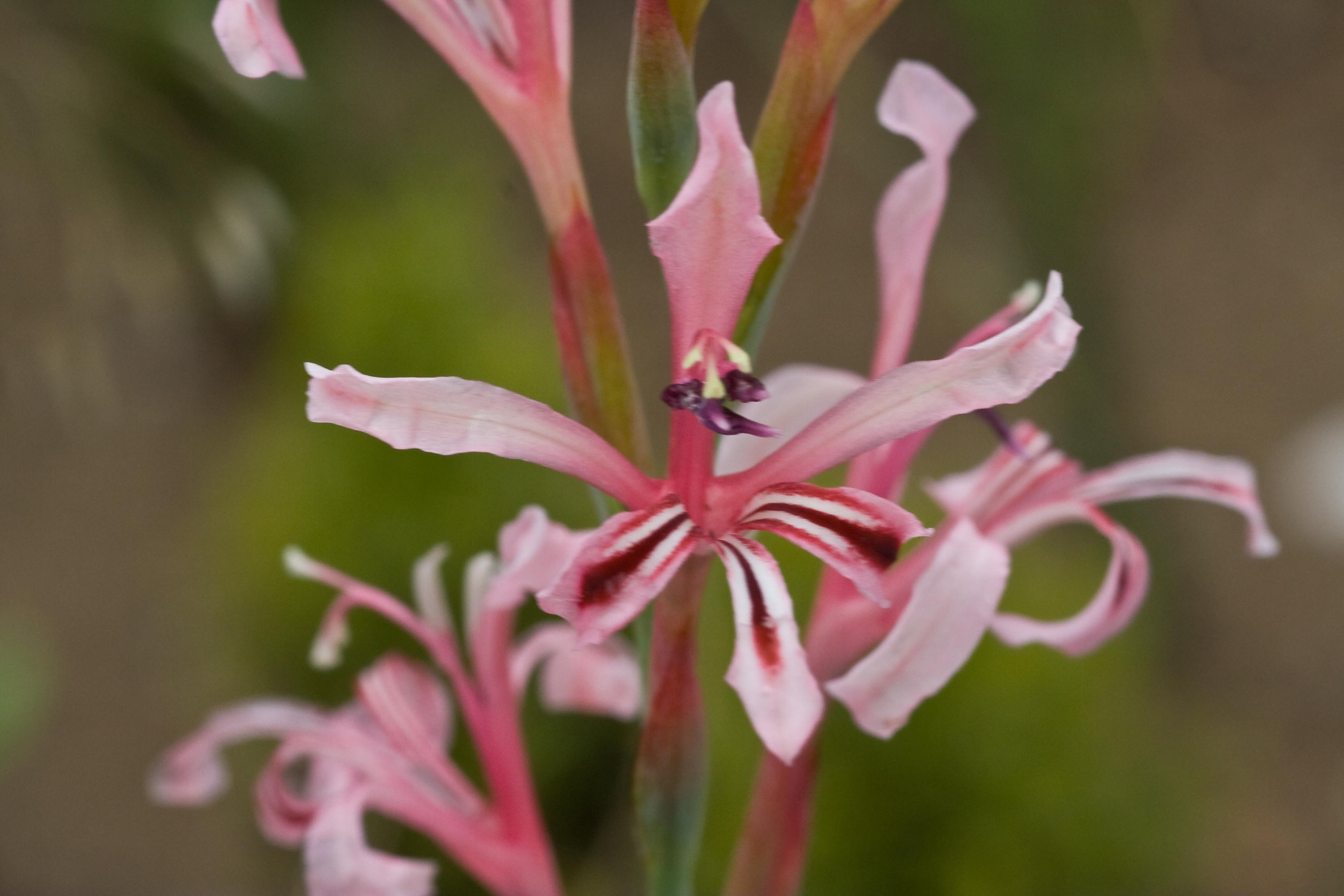

Scientific classification
- Kingdom: Plantae
- Clade: Tracheophytes
- Clade: Angiosperms
- Clade: Monocots
- Order: Asparagales
- Family: Iridaceae
- Genus: Tritoniopsis
- Species: T. ramosa

Binomial name
- Tritoniopsis ramosa (Klatt) G.J.Lewis, (1959)

Synonyms
- Antholyza ramosa Klatt; Exohebea ramosa (Klatt) R.C.Foster; Exohebea unguiculata (Baker) R.C.Foster; Gladiolus ramosus (Klatt) N.E.Br.; Gladiolus scorpius L. ex B.D.Jacks.; Gladiolus unguiculatus (Baker) N.E.Br.; Hebea ramosa Eckl.; Hebea unguiculata (Baker) L.Bolus; Tritonia nervosa Baker; Tritonia unguiculata Baker; Tritoniopsis ramosa var. robusta G.J.Lewis; Tritoniopsis ramosa var. unguiculata (Baker) G.J.Lewis

= Tritoniopsis ramosa =

Species of plant

Tritoniopsis ramosa is a perennial plant and geophyte belonging to the genus Tritoniopsis and is part of the fynbos. The species is endemic to the Eastern Cape and Western Cape.
