= Tritoniopsis williamsiana =

Scientific classification
- Kingdom: Plantae
- Clade: Tracheophytes
- Clade: Angiosperms
- Clade: Monocots
- Order: Asparagales
- Family: Iridaceae
- Genus: Tritoniopsis
- Species: T. williamsiana

Binomial name
- Tritoniopsis williamsiana Goldblatt, (1990)

Species of plant

Tritoniopsis williamsiana is a perennial plant and geophyte belonging to the genus Tritoniopsis and is part of the fynbos. The species is endemic to the Western Cape and occurs from the Kogelberg to the Kleinrivier Mountains. The plant's habitat is protected and the plant is not threatened, but is considered rare.
