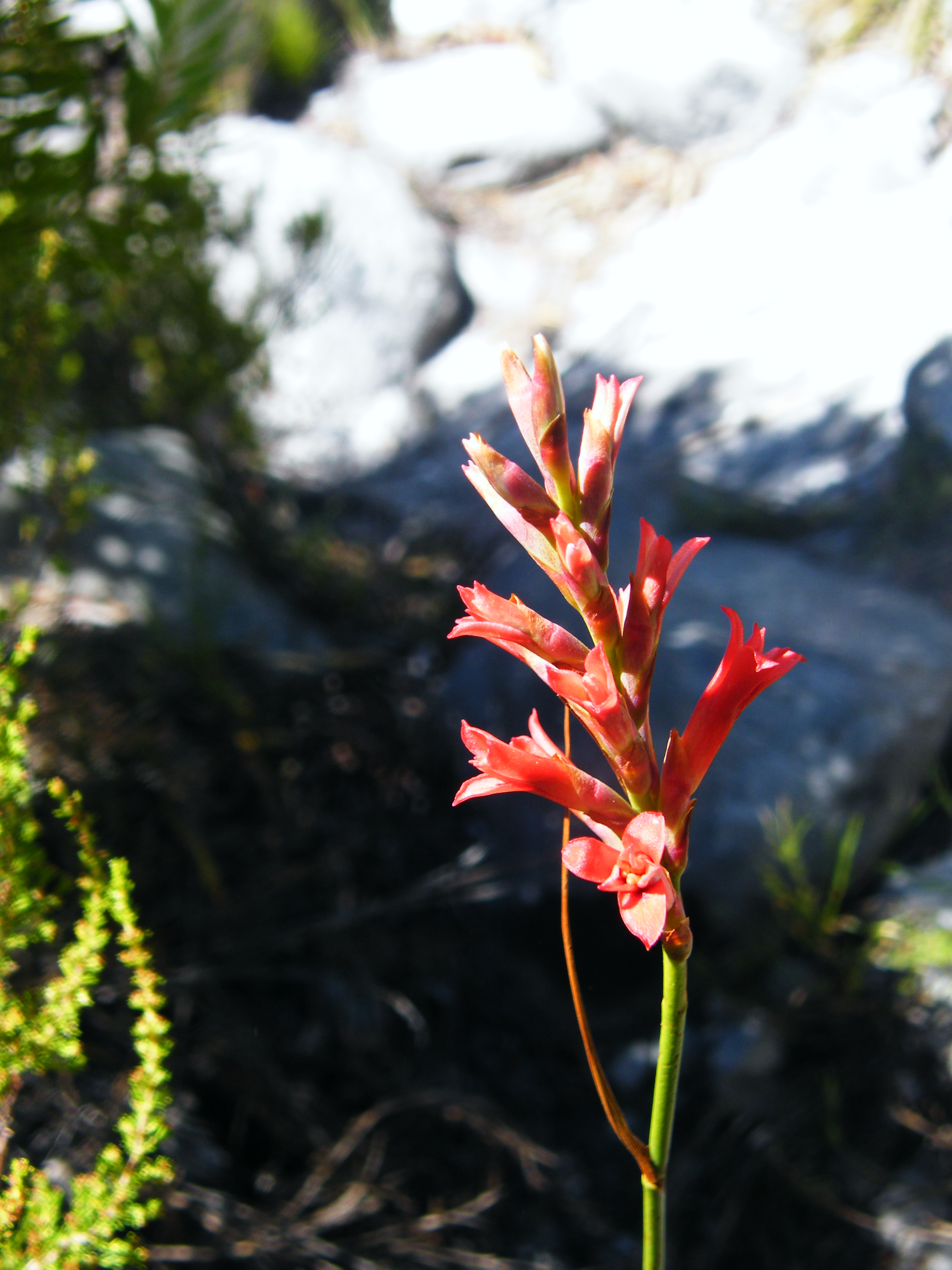
- Tritoniopsis triticea

Scientific classification
- Kingdom: Plantae
- Clade: Tracheophytes
- Clade: Angiosperms
- Clade: Monocots
- Order: Asparagales
- Family: Iridaceae
- Subfamily: Crocoideae
- Tribe: Tritoniopsideae; Goldblatt & Manning
- Genus: Tritoniopsis; L.Bolus

Type species
- Tritoniopsis lesliei L.Bolus

Synonyms
- Anapalina N.E.Br.; Exohebea R.C.Foster; Schweiggera E.Mey. ex Baker; Tanaosolen N.E.Br.

= Tritoniopsis (plant) =

Genus of flowering plants

Tritoniopsis is a genus of flowering plants in the family Iridaceae, first described as a genus in 1926. The entire genus is endemic to Cape Province in South Africa. The genus name refers to the African genus Tritonia and is combined with the Greek word opsis, meaning "look-alike".

== Species ==
23 species are accepted.

- Tritoniopsis afra (N.E.Br.) Goldblatt & J.C.Manning
- Tritoniopsis antholyza (Poir.) Goldblatt
- Tritoniopsis bicolor J.C.Manning & Goldblatt
- Tritoniopsis cinnamomea J.C.Manning & Goldblatt
- Tritoniopsis dodii (G.J.Lewis) G.J.Lewis
- Tritoniopsis elongata (L.Bolus) G.J.Lewis
- Tritoniopsis flava J.C.Manning & Goldblatt
- Tritoniopsis flexuosa (L.f.) G.J.Lewis
- Tritoniopsis intermedia (Baker) Goldblatt
- Tritoniopsis lata (L.Bolus) G.J.Lewis
- Tritoniopsis latifolia G.J.Lewis
- Tritoniopsis lesliei L.Bolus
- Tritoniopsis nemorosa (E.Mey. ex Klatt) G.J.Lewis
- Tritoniopsis nervosa (Baker) G.J.Lewis
- Tritoniopsis parviflora (Jacq.) G.J.Lewis
- Tritoniopsis pulchella G.J.Lewis
- Tritoniopsis pulchra (Baker) Goldblatt
- Tritoniopsis ramosa (Klatt) G.J.Lewis
- Tritoniopsis revoluta (Burm.f.) Goldblatt
- Tritoniopsis toximontana J.C.Manning & Goldblatt
- Tritoniopsis triticea (Burm.f.) Goldblatt (synonym Tritoniopsis burchellii (N.E.Br.) Goldblatt)
- Tritoniopsis unguicularis (Lam.) G.J.Lewis (synonym Tritoniopsis caledonensis (R.C.Foster) G.J.Lewis)
- Tritoniopsis williamsiana Goldblatt
