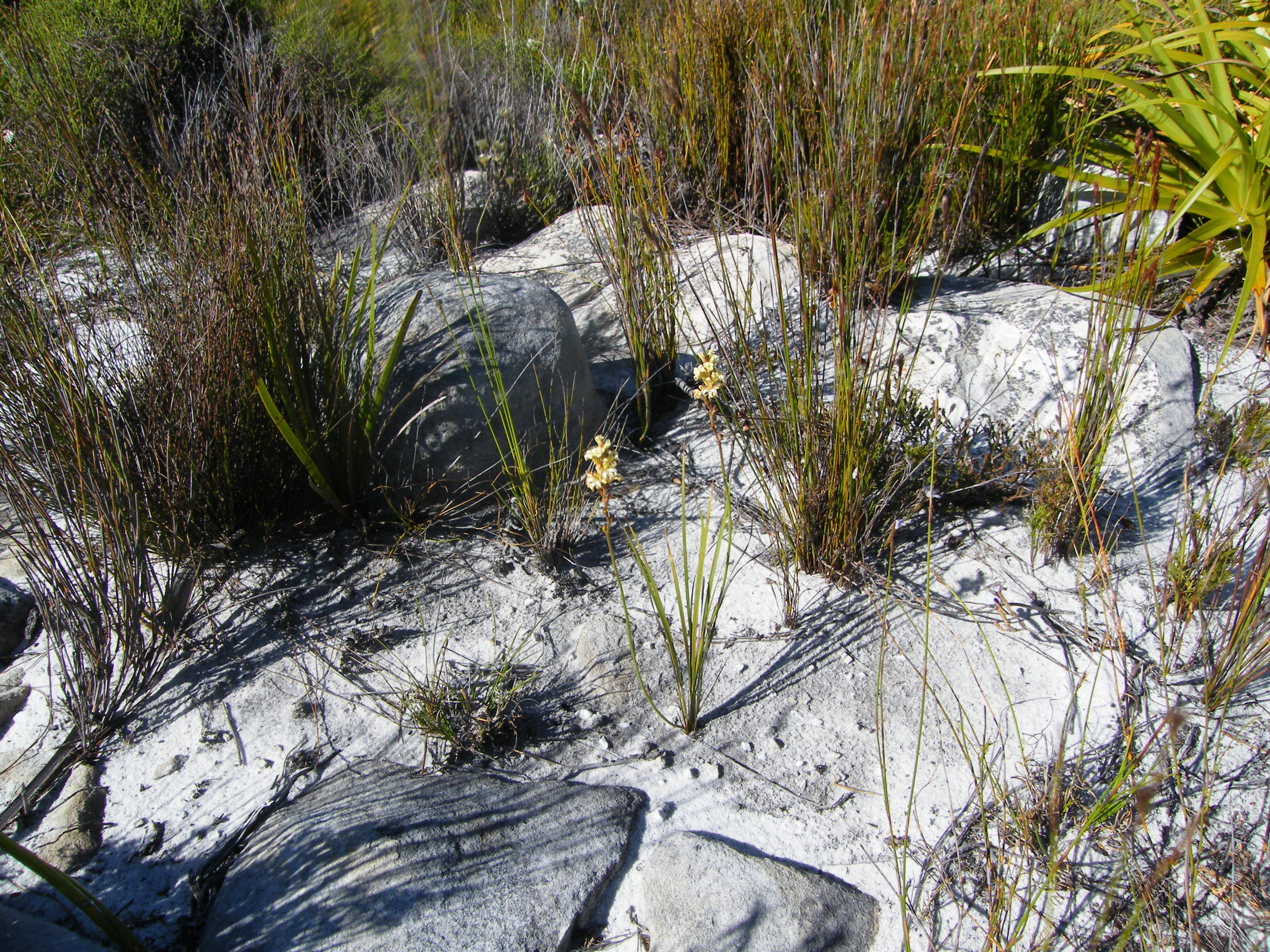

Scientific classification
- Kingdom: Plantae
- Clade: Tracheophytes
- Clade: Angiosperms
- Clade: Monocots
- Order: Asparagales
- Family: Iridaceae
- Genus: Tritoniopsis
- Species: T. unguicularis

Binomial name
- Tritoniopsis unguicularis (Lam.) G.J.Lewis, (1959)

Synonyms
- Antholyza orchidiflora (Eckl.) Klatt; Exohebea fraterna (N.E.Br.) R.C.Foster; Exohebea unguicularis (Lam.) G.J.Lewis; Gladiolus arenarius Baker; Gladiolus fraternus N.E.Br.; Gladiolus orchidiflorus Pers.; Gladiolus tabularis Pers.; Hebea arenaria (Baker) L.Bolus; Hebea orchidiflora Eckl.; Hebea tabularis (Pers.) Eckl.; Moraea unguicularis Lam.; Schweiggera montana E.Mey. ex Baker; Vieusseuxia unguicularis (Lam.) Roem. & Schult.

= Tritoniopsis unguicularis =

Species of plant

Tritoniopsis unguicularis is a perennial plant and geophyte belonging to the genus Tritoniopsis and is part of the fynbos. The species is endemic to the Western Cape.
