= Tritoniopsis lesliei =

Scientific classification
- Kingdom: Plantae
- Clade: Tracheophytes
- Clade: Angiosperms
- Clade: Monocots
- Order: Asparagales
- Family: Iridaceae
- Genus: Tritoniopsis
- Species: T. lesliei

Binomial name
- Tritoniopsis lesliei L.Bolus, (1929)

Species of plant

Tritoniopsis lesliei is a perennial plant and geophyte belonging to the genus Tritoniopsis and is part of the fynbos. The species is endemic to the Western Cape and occurs on the eastern slopes of the Skurweberg; from the Koue Bokkeveld to Ceres. The plant is threatened by invasive plants.
