= Terete =

Term used in botany

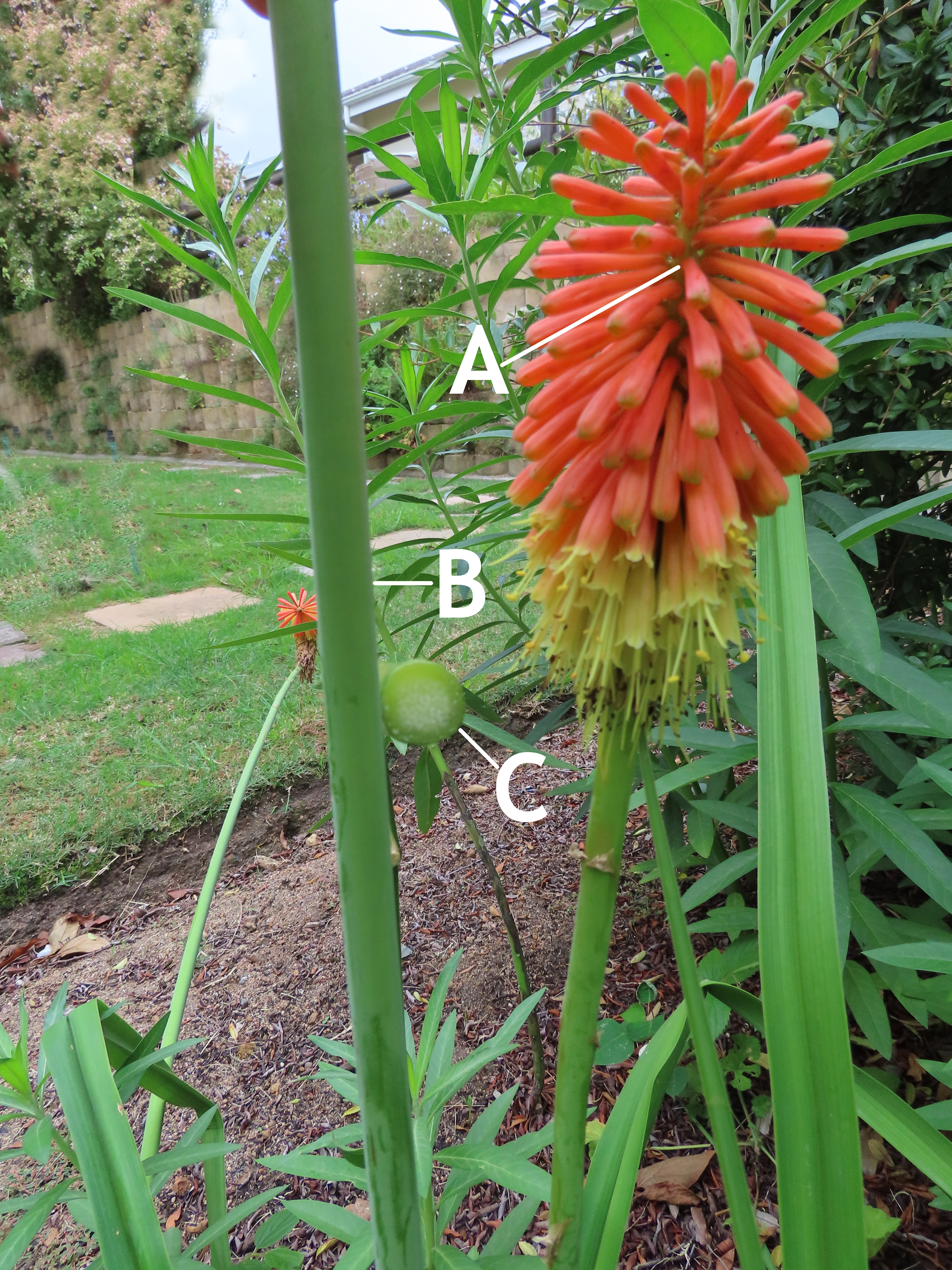
Terete raceme of Kniphofia with a cross section of a peduncle. A: An inflorescence of this plant B: The terete peduncle of another inflorescence of the plant C: A cross section of such a peduncle, practically circular

Terete is a term in botany used to describe a cross section that is circular, or like a distorted circle, with a single surface wrapping around it. That is usually contrasted with cross-sections that are flattened, with a distinct upper surface that is different from the lower surface. The cross-section of a branch in a tree is somewhat round, so the branch is terete. The cross section of a normal leaf has an upper surface, and a lower surface, so the leaf is not terete. However, the fleshy leaves of succulents are sometimes terete. Fruticose lichens are terete, with a roughly circular cross section and a single wrap-around skin-like surface called the cortex, compared to foliose lichens and crustose lichens, which have a flattened cross section with an upper surface that is distinct from the lower surface.

Plants and lichens may also be described as subterete, meaning that they are not completely terete.
