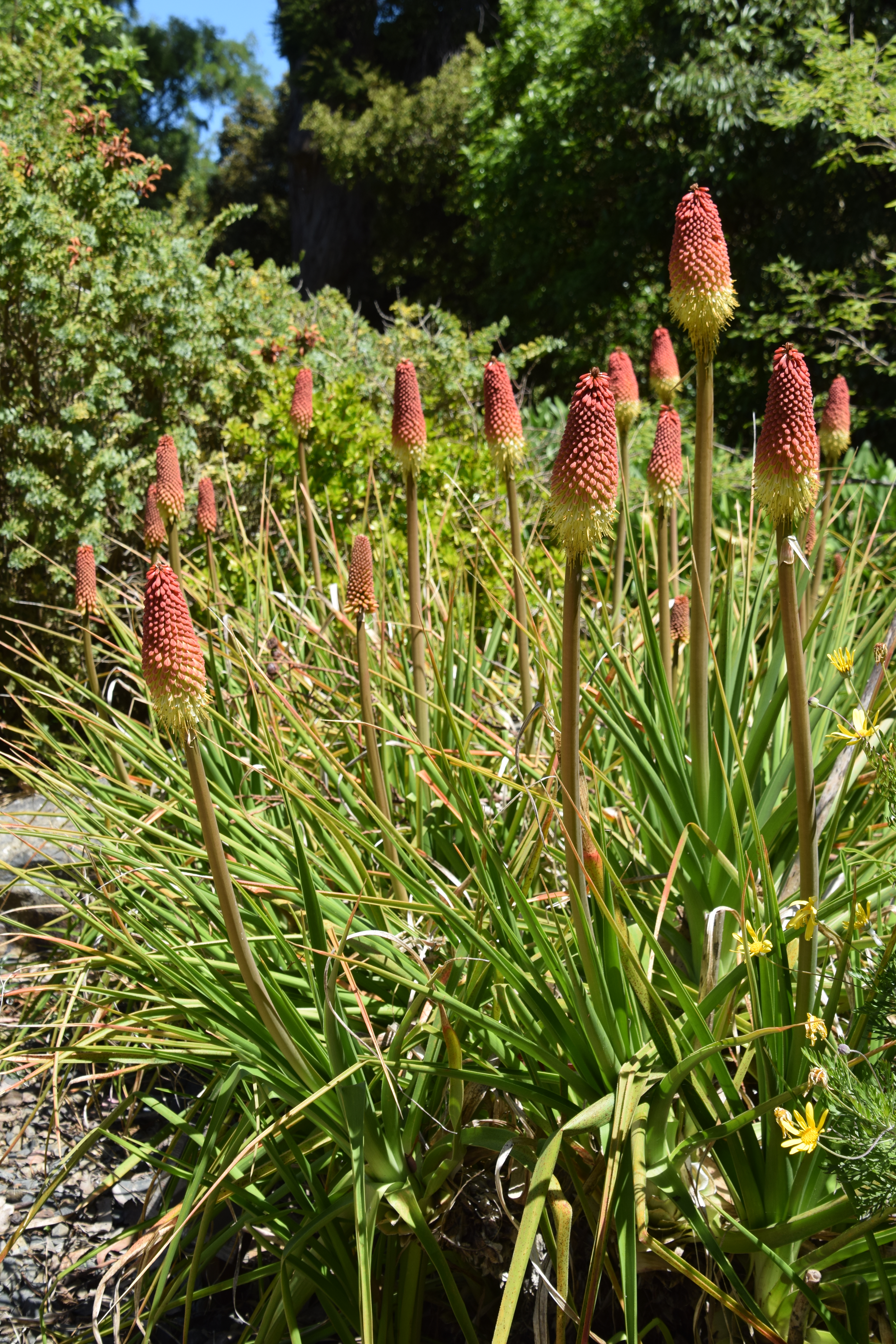

Scientific classification
- Kingdom: Plantae
- Clade: Tracheophytes
- Clade: Angiosperms
- Clade: Monocots
- Order: Asparagales
- Family: Asphodelaceae
- Subfamily: Asphodeloideae
- Genus: Kniphofia
- Species: K. northiae

Binomial name
- Kniphofia northiae Baker

Synonyms
- Tritoma northiae (Baker) Skeels

= Kniphofia northiae =

Species of flowering plant

Kniphofia northiae, the giant red-hot poker, is a species of flowering plant in the family Asphodelaceae, native to the Eastern Cape of South Africa. Growing to 1.7 m (5.6 ft) tall, it is a robust evergreen perennial with handsome curved leaves resembling an aloe. In spring and summer the stout central stem bears oval flowerheads consisting of many tubular florets packed closely together. Green in bud, the flowers open to a muted red and fade from the base to yellow and brown, thus giving the appearance of a red-hot poker.

K. northiae is found above 300 m (980 ft) in the mountain grassland of the Drakensberg from the Eastern Cape to KwaZulu-Natal. This species is named after the English botanical artist Marianne North.

K. northiae is valued in horticulture for its architectural qualities. It is hardy down to −10 °C (14 °F). Slightly larger and more tender than its cousin K. rooperi it favours milder locations such as the south west coast of England. It requires a situation in full sun, which is reliably moist but well-drained. It has gained the Royal Horticultural Society's Award of Garden Merit.

== Gallery ==
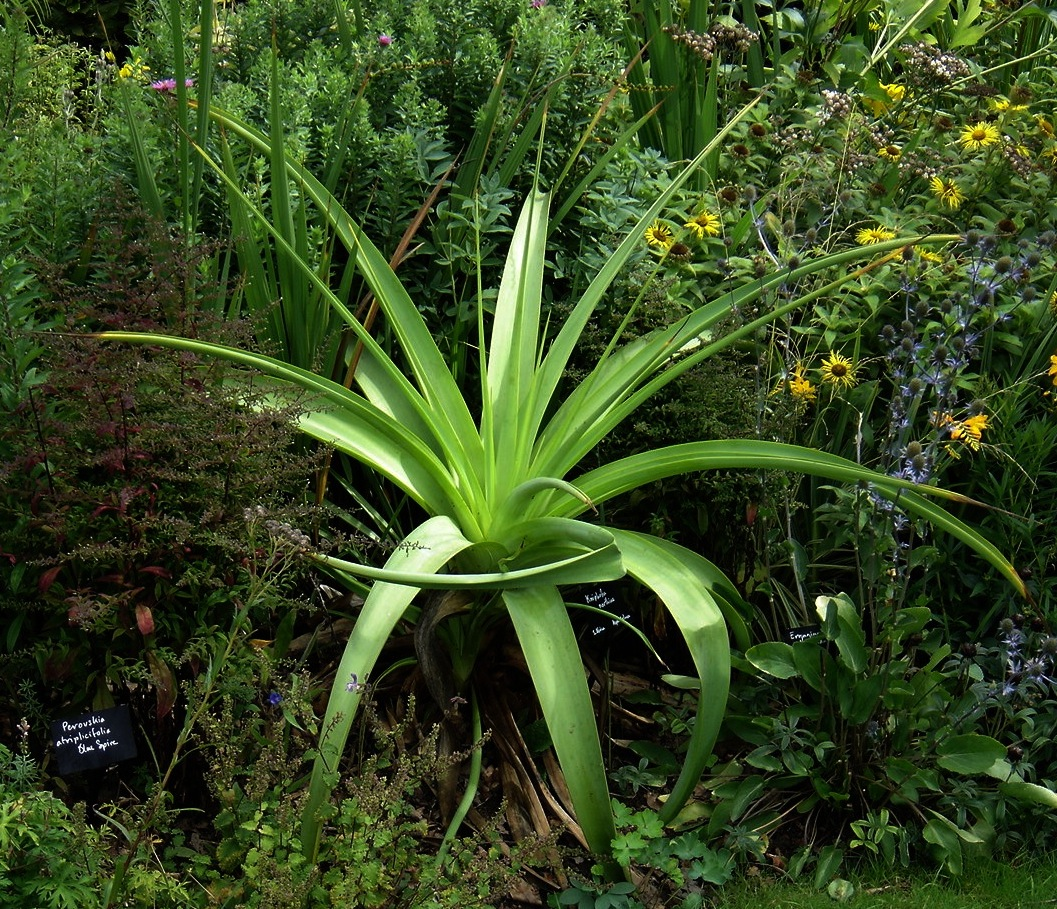

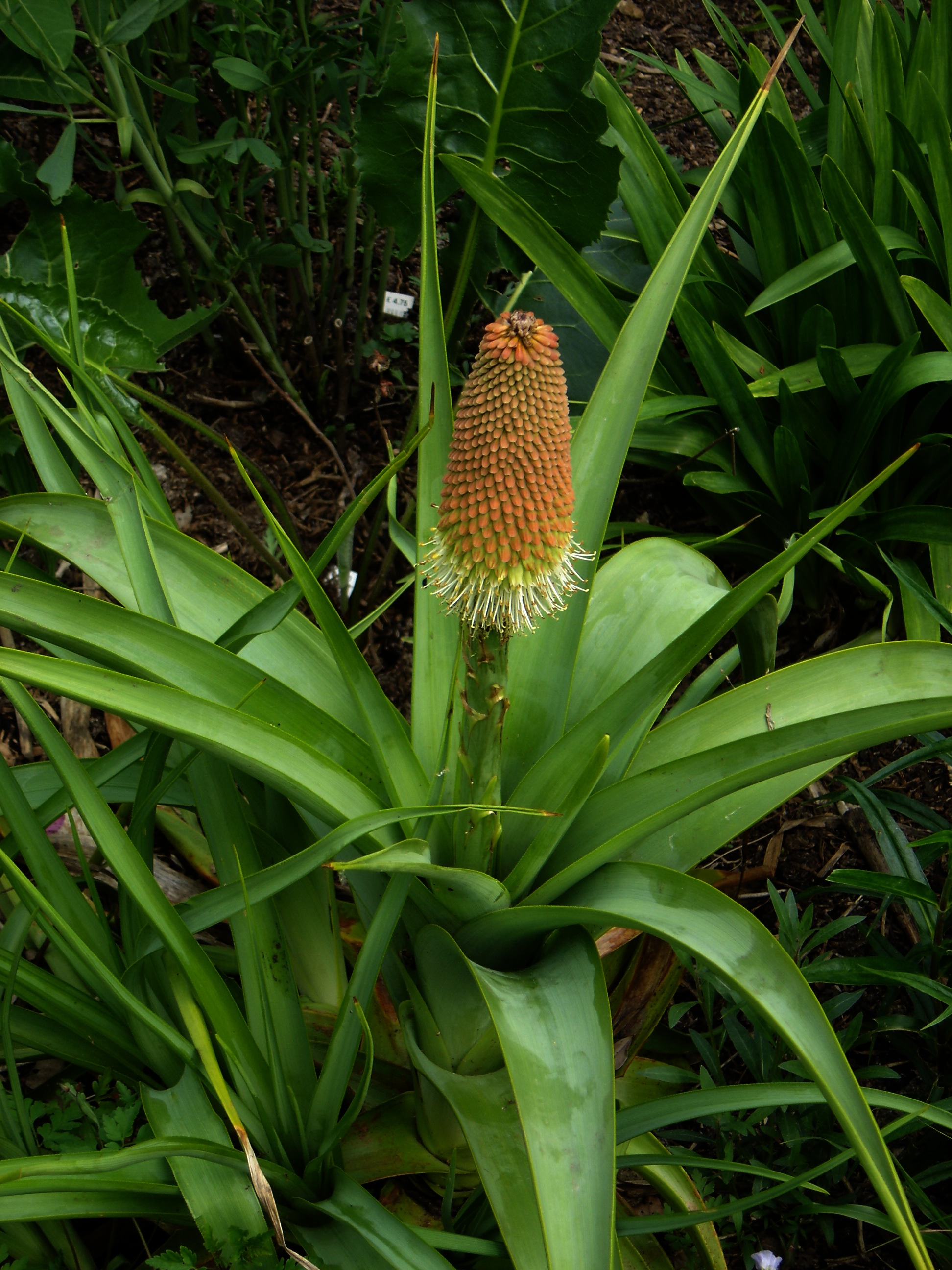

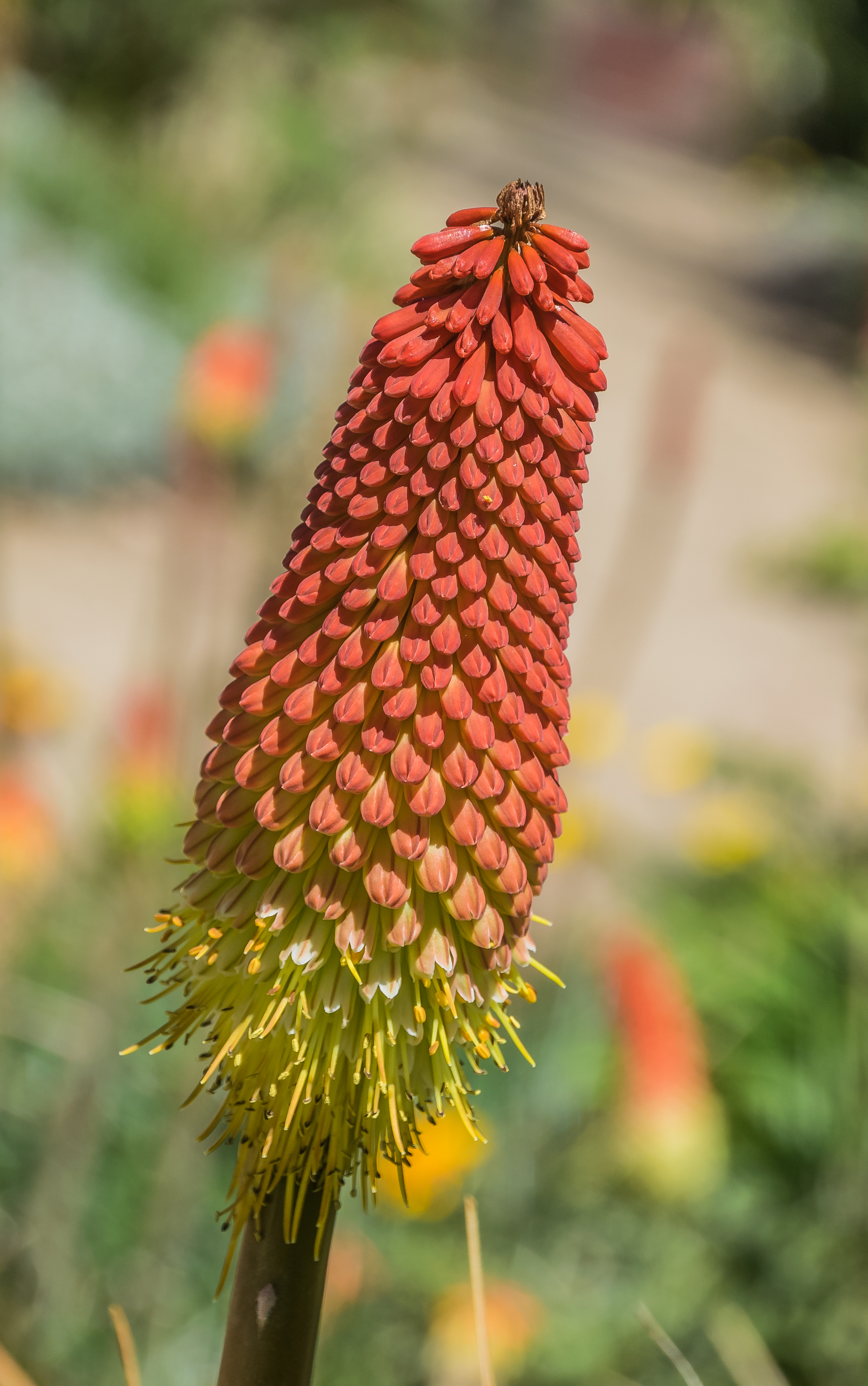
