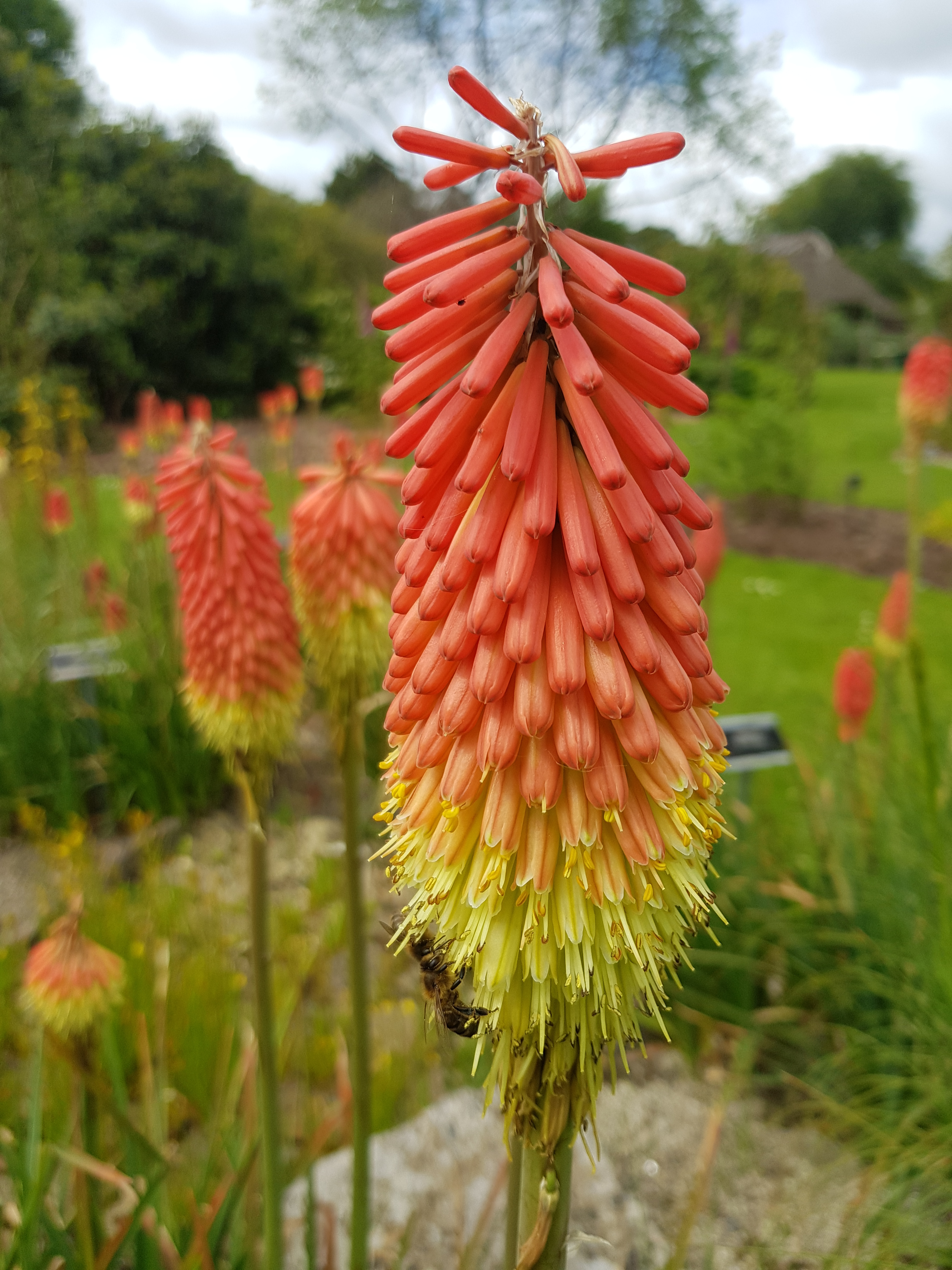

Scientific classification
- Kingdom: Plantae
- Clade: Tracheophytes
- Clade: Angiosperms
- Clade: Monocots
- Order: Asparagales
- Family: Asphodelaceae
- Subfamily: Asphodeloideae
- Genus: Kniphofia
- Species: K. × praecox

Binomial name
- Kniphofia × praecox Baker

Synonyms
- Tritoma × praecox (Baker) Rob.

= Kniphofia × praecox =

Species of flowering plant

Kniphofia × praecox, also known as Kniphofia praecox or the greater red-hot poker (Afrikaans: Vuurpyl) is a species of flowering plant in the family Asphodelaceae.

This species is believed to be the result of hybridization between Kniphofia uvaria and Kniphofia bruceae, leading to it being referred to as Kniphofia × praecox.

== Description ==
Kniphofia × praecox is a clump forming perennial species, with narrow grass-like leaves. Leaves can reach a maximum length of 2 metres. Plants produce upright, long flower stalks. Due to the plants flower stalks they can reach a height of 1.5 metres tall. Stems host a cylindrical cluster of flowers. Flower buds start off scarlet red and transition to a reddish-orange and then yellow as they mature.

== Distribution ==
Kniphofia × praecox is native to South Africa, where it is found from the Swartberg Mountains to the Eastern Cape.

The species is used in gardens around the world as an ornamental plant. Introduced/escaped populations have been recorded within the United Kingdom, Belgium, New Zealand, Colombia and Ecuador.

== Habitat ==
Kniphofia × praecox naturally grows alongside streams, riverbanks and marshland habitats.

It is naturally found at elevations of around 2400 metres above sea level.

Outside of its natural range it has been recorded to grow on the verges of railway tracks.
