= Kniphofia reflexa =

Conservation status
- Endangered (IUCN 2.3)

Scientific classification
- Kingdom: Plantae
- Clade: Embryophytes
- Clade: Tracheophytes
- Clade: Spermatophytes
- Clade: Angiosperms
- Clade: Monocots
- Order: Asparagales
- Family: Asphodelaceae
- Subfamily: Asphodeloideae
- Genus: Kniphofia
- Species: K. reflexa

Binomial name
- Kniphofia reflexa Hutch. ex Codd

Species of flowering plant

Kniphofia reflexa is a species of flowering plant in the family Asphodelaceae. It is a perennial endemic to Mount Oku in Cameroon. Its natural habitat is swamps and stream edges from 1,750 to 2,900 metres elevation. It is threatened by habitat loss.
