= Marianne North =

English biologist and artist (1830–1890)

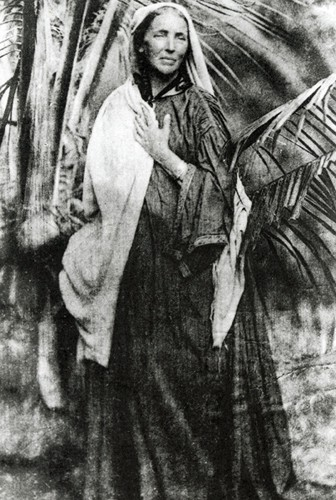
- North at her home in Ceylon before 1879. Photographed by Julia Margaret Cameron
- Born: 24 October 1830; Hastings, Sussex, England
- Died: 30 August 1890 (aged 59); Alderley, Gloucestershire, England
- Parent(s): Frederick North; Janet Marjoribanks

Marianne North (24 October 1830 – 30 August 1890) was an English biologist and botanical artist, known for her plant and landscape paintings, extensive foreign travels, writings, plant discoveries, and the creation of a gallery at the Royal Botanic Gardens, Kew. She was born in Hastings, England.

== Early life ==
North was the eldest of three children of a prosperous land-owning family descended from Roger North, younger son of Dudley North, 4th Baron North. Her father was Frederick North, a Norfolk deputy lieutenant, justice of the peace, and M.P. for Hastings. North's mother, Janet, was the daughter of Sir John Marjoribanks M.P., 1st Baronet of Lees in the County of Berwick.

== Education ==
North trained as a vocalist under Charlotte Helen Sainton-Dolby, but her voice failed, and she then devoted herself to painting flowers. After the death of her mother in 1855, she constantly travelled with her father; and on his death in 1869 she decided to pursue her early ambition of painting the flora of distant countries.

She began flower painting after the death of her mother. The family had homes in Hastings and London in this period. Her interest in botany may have stemmed from her father's acquaintance with Sir Joseph Dalton Hooker, director of Royal Botanic Gardens, Kew. Her first watercolour landscapes were undertaken on a trip to Europe with her sister and father.

== Career ==
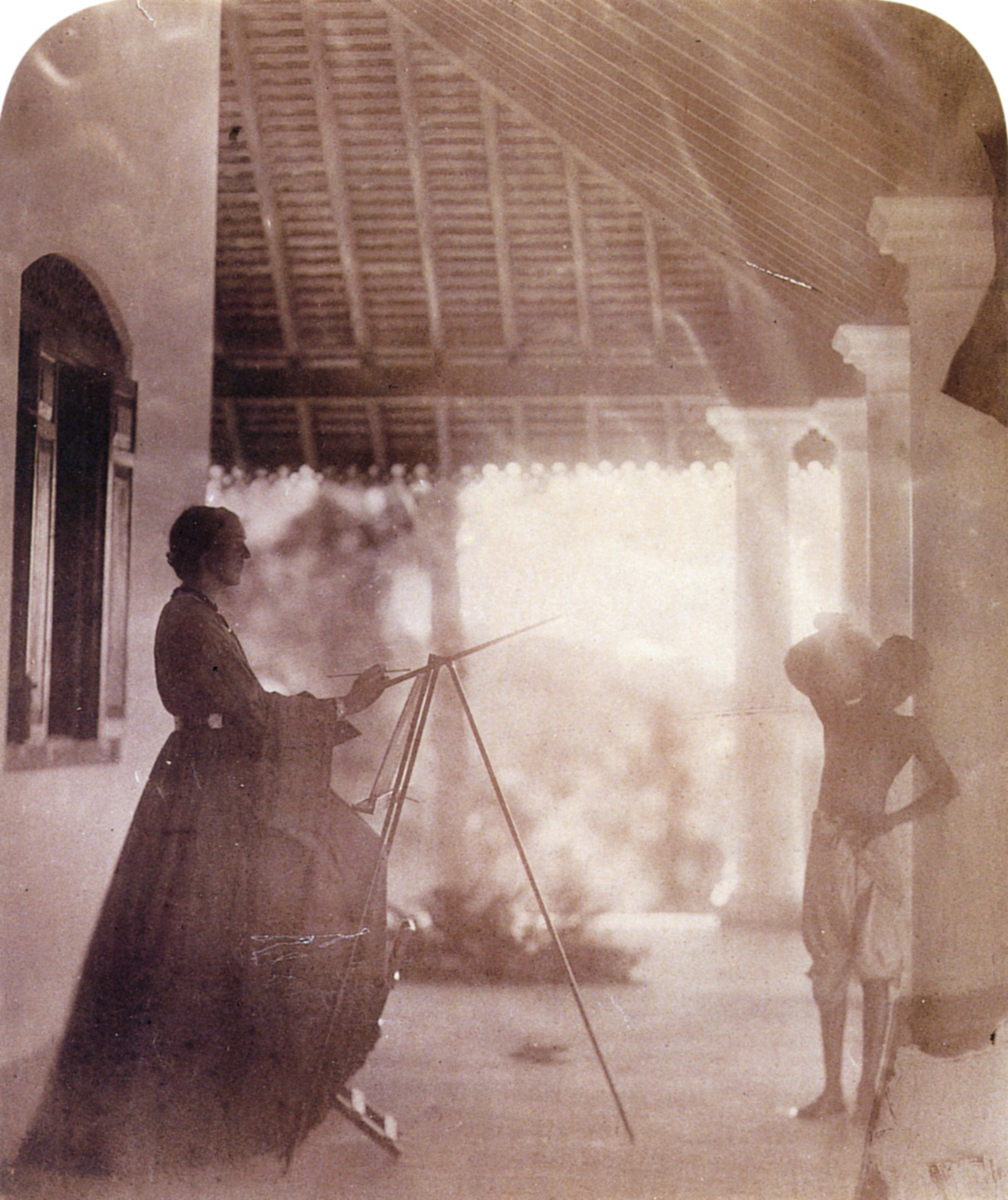
Marianne North in Mrs Cameron's house in Ceylon (1877), by Julia Margaret Cameron

After her sister married in 1864 and her father lost his seat in parliament, the two spent even more time travelling, visiting Switzerland and South Tyrol. They travelled in Syria and along the Nile in 1865–67. Her father became ill in the Alps in 1869, and she brought him back to Hastings, where he died. She continued to paint as a way to assuage her grief. After her father's death, she travelled and made paintings in Sicily.

In 1871–72, she travelled to Canada, the United States and Jamaica, and spent a year in Brazil, where she did much of her work at a hut in the depths of a forest. North was encouraged to visit South America by Frederic Edwin Church, whom she considered "the greatest of living landscape painters" and whose home in New York, Olana, she visited twice. In 1875, after a few months in Tenerife, she began a journey round the world and for two years painted the flora of California, Japan, Borneo, Java and Ceylon. During her visit to California, she recorded her concern with the destruction of the redwoods. She spent all of 1878 in various parts of India.

In 1878 The Graphic reported an exhibition of her works at Kensington, in which 512 of her oil paintings were put on public display. The article praises North for "her freedom of hand, the purity and brilliancy of colour and the accurate draughtsmanship of a consummate artist". On her return to Britain, North exhibited her drawings in London. She offered to give the collection to the Royal Botanic Gardens at Kew and to erect a gallery to house them. This offer was accepted, and the new buildings, designed by James Fergusson, were begun that year.

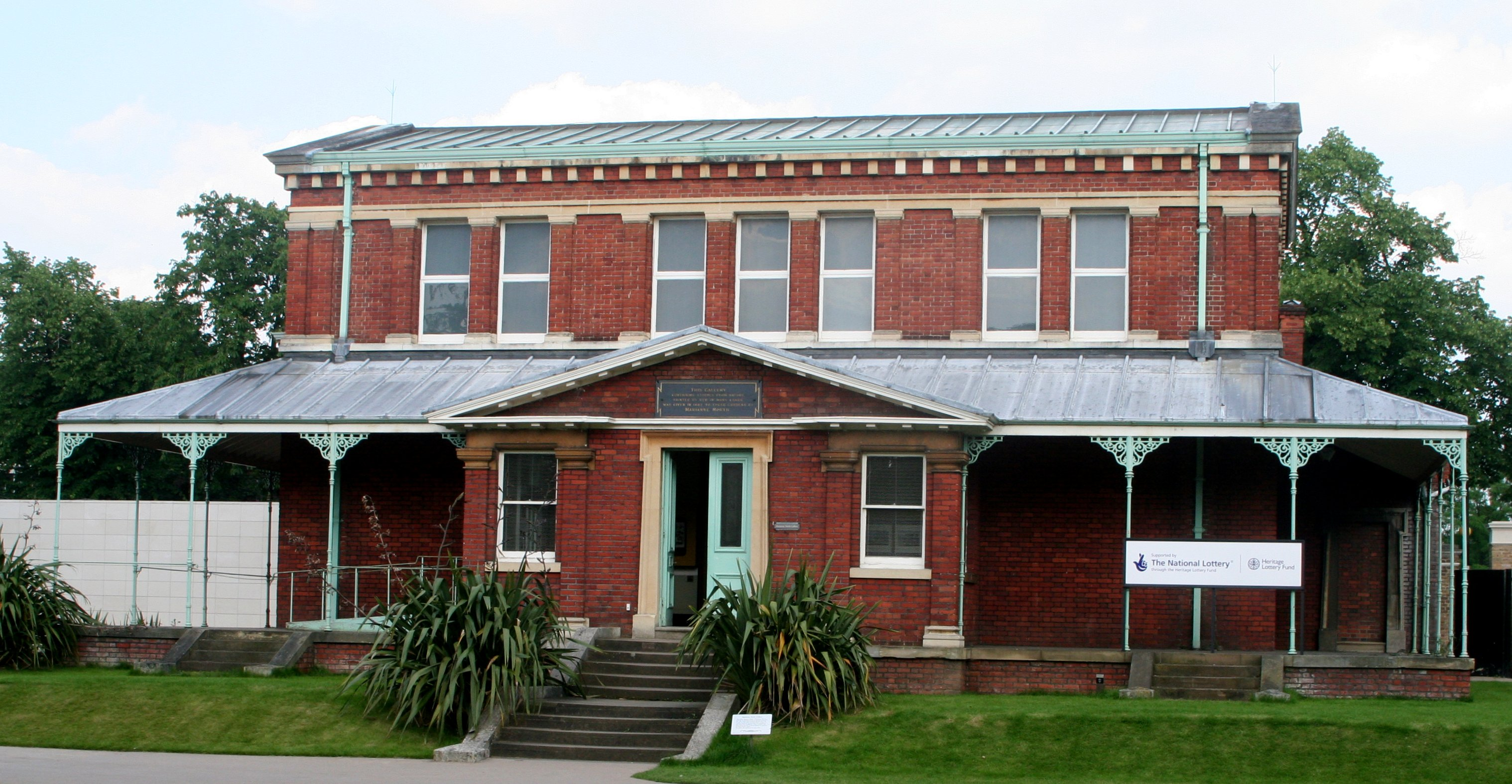
The Marianne North Gallery of Botanic Art in Kew Gardens

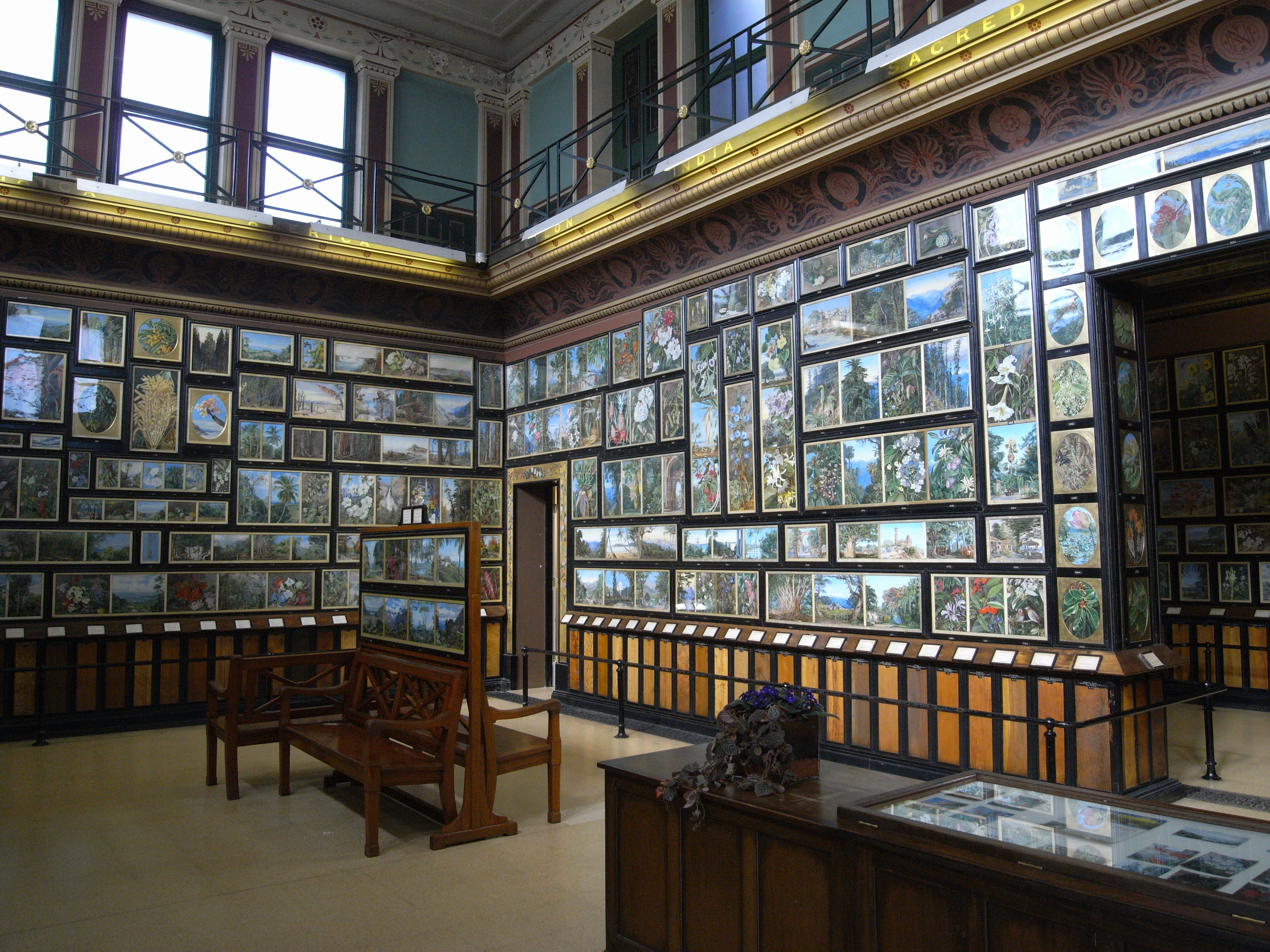
The Marianne North Gallery, interior

At Charles Darwin's suggestion, North went to Australia in 1880 and for a year painted there and in New Zealand. On her return, she presented Darwin the shrub 'Australian Sheep' (Raoulia eximia) as a gift and showed him her Australian pictures. Her paintings of Banksia attenuata, B. grandis and B. robur were highly regarded. Her gallery at Kew was opened in 1882. On display for the opening of the gallery were 800 oil on cardboard paintings, which represented 20 years of North's life and travels.

In 1883, after a visit to South Africa, during which trip she called on the botanical artist Katharine Saunders, an additional room was opened at the Kew gallery, and in 1884–85 North worked in the Seychelles and in Chile. When ill health curtailed her travelling she moved to Alderley, Gloucestershire, where she died on 30 August 1890 and is buried in the local churchyard.

== Legacy ==
The scientific accuracy with which North documented plant life in all parts of the world, before photography became a practical option, gives her work a permanent value. Plant species named in her honour include Areca northiana, Chassalia northiana, Crinum northianum, Kniphofia northiae, Nepenthes northiana, and the genus name Northia.

Kew Gardens claims that the North Gallery (situated in the east section of the gardens) is "the only permanent solo exhibition by a female artist in Britain". In 2008 Kew obtained a substantial grant from the National Lottery, which enabled it to mount a major restoration of both the gallery and the paintings inside. On 26 September 2016, the television channel BBC Four broadcast Kew's Forgotten Queen. The documentary tells the story of North's life.

Her autobiography Recollections of a Happy Life was published posthumously by her sister Janet Catherine Symonds (née North) in 1894. Her autobiography is an account of her travels, with chapters that narrate her experiences and descriptions of her times in Canada, the United States, Jamaica, Brazil, Tenerife, Japan, Singapore, India, Borneo and Java.

== Gallery ==
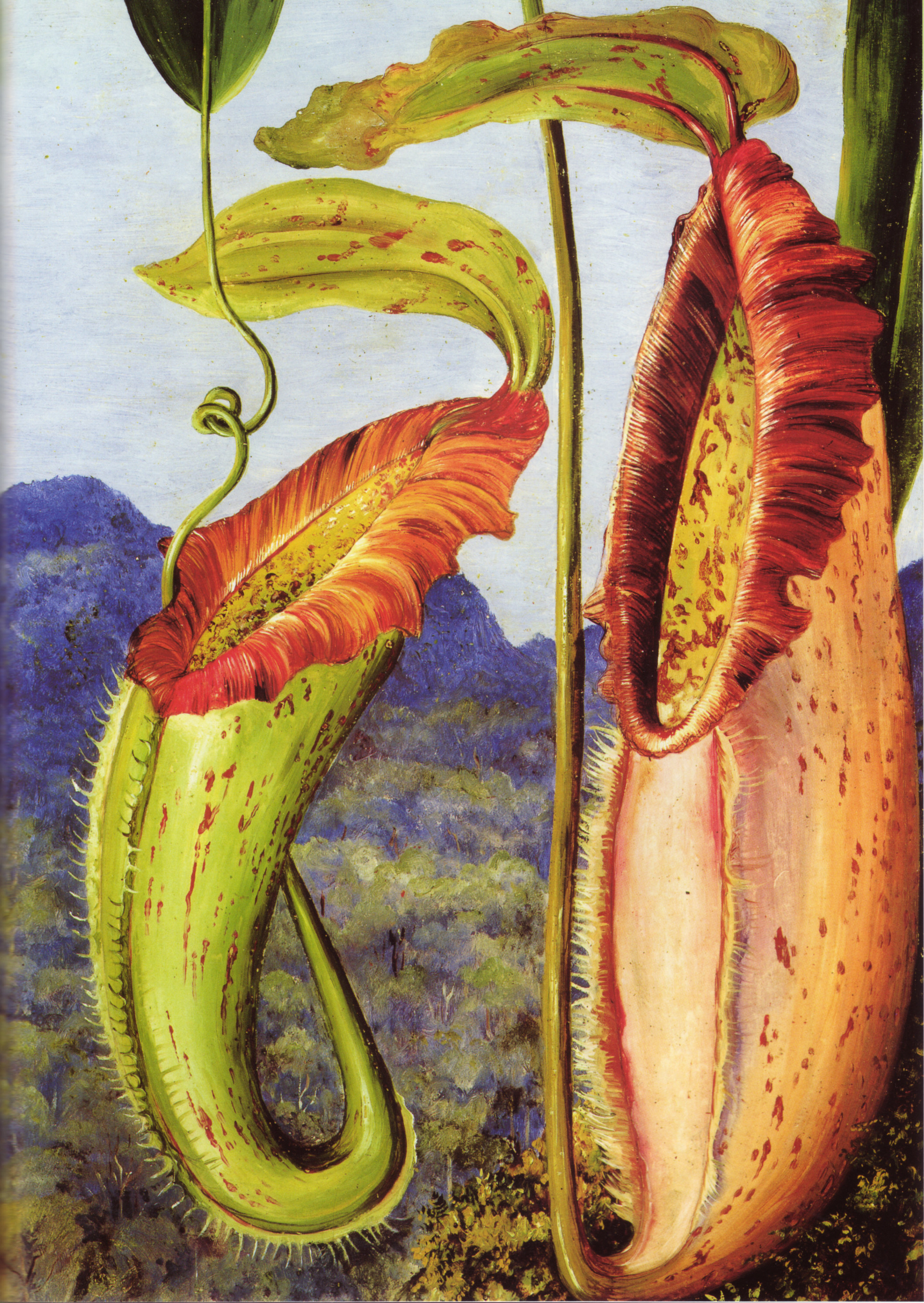
Nepenthes northiana (c. 1876), Marianne North Gallery, Kew Gardens. The painting shows the pitcher plant's lower and an upper pitcher.

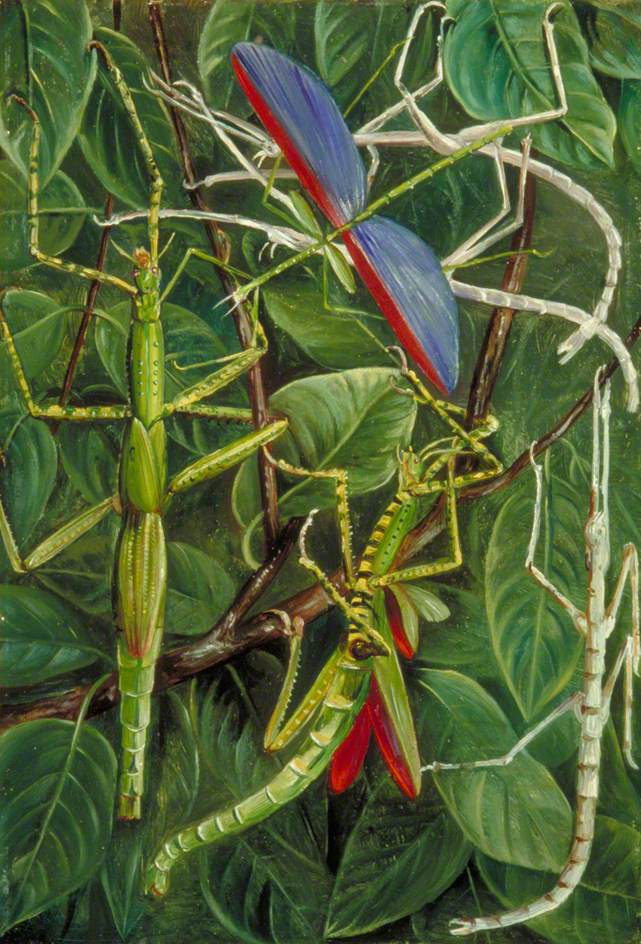
Leaf Insects and Stick Insects, c. 1870

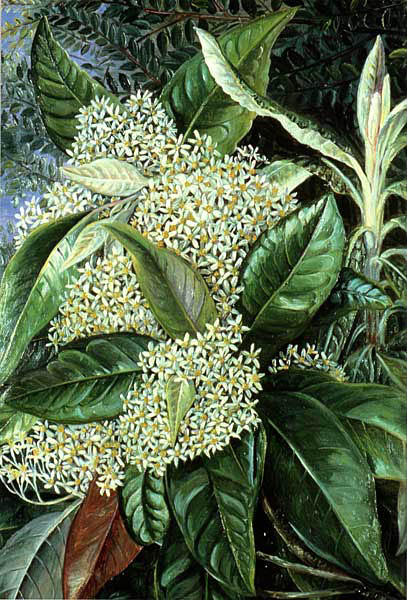
Olearia argophylla, Marianne North Gallery, Kew Gardens

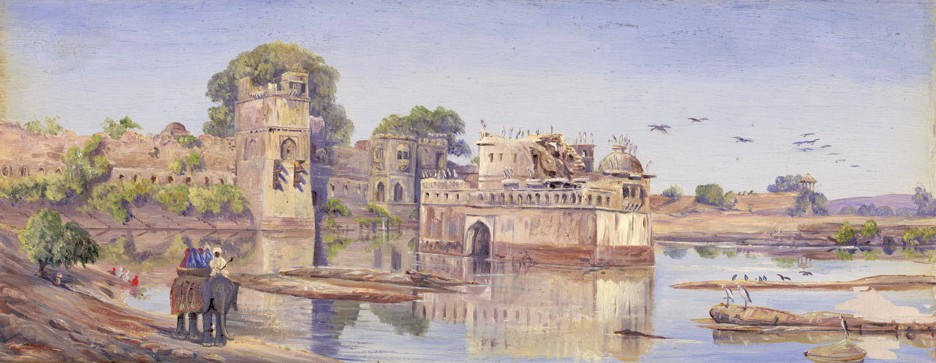
Water Palace - Chitore. India. Decr. 1878, British Library

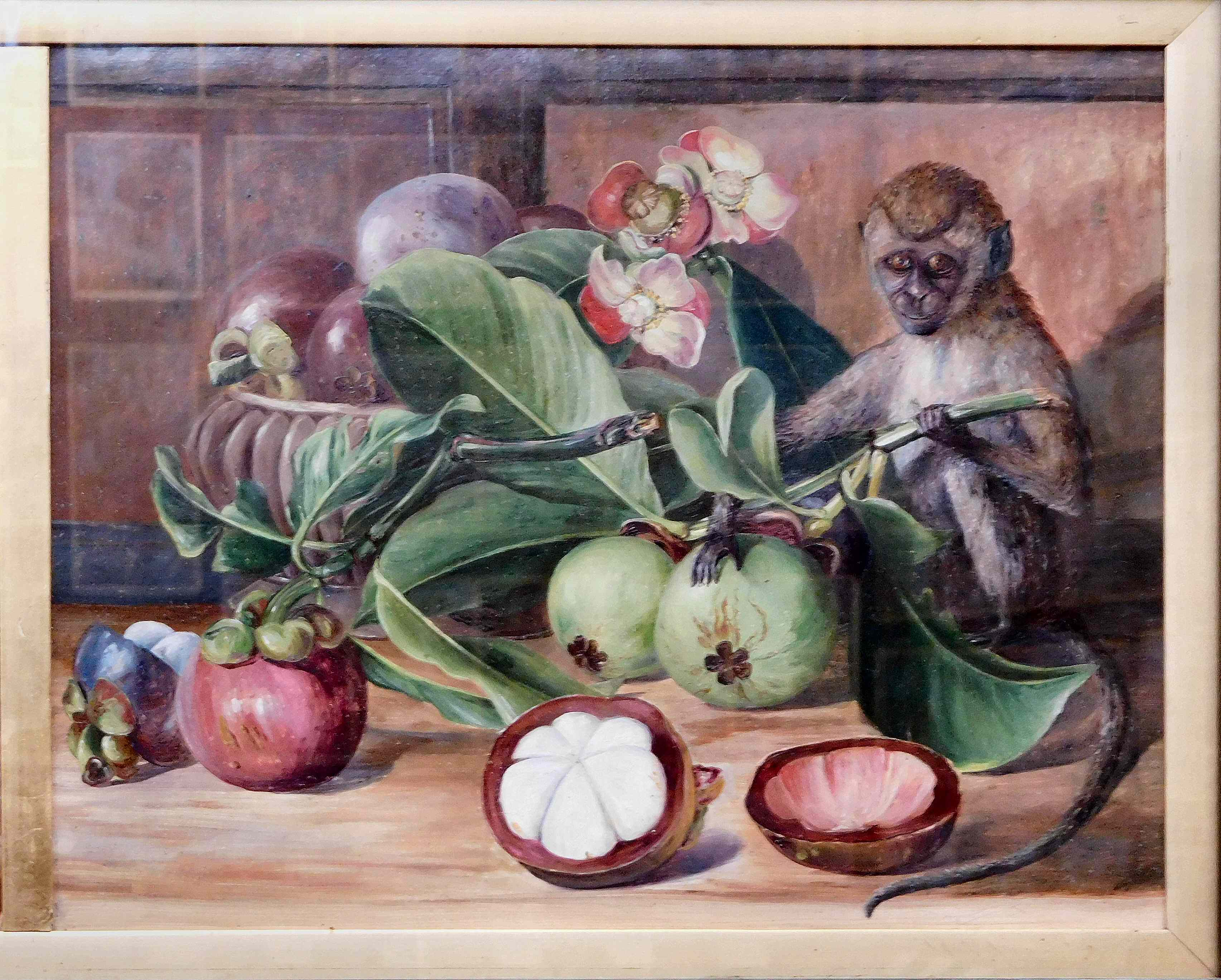
Flowers and fruit of the mangosteen, and Singapore monkey

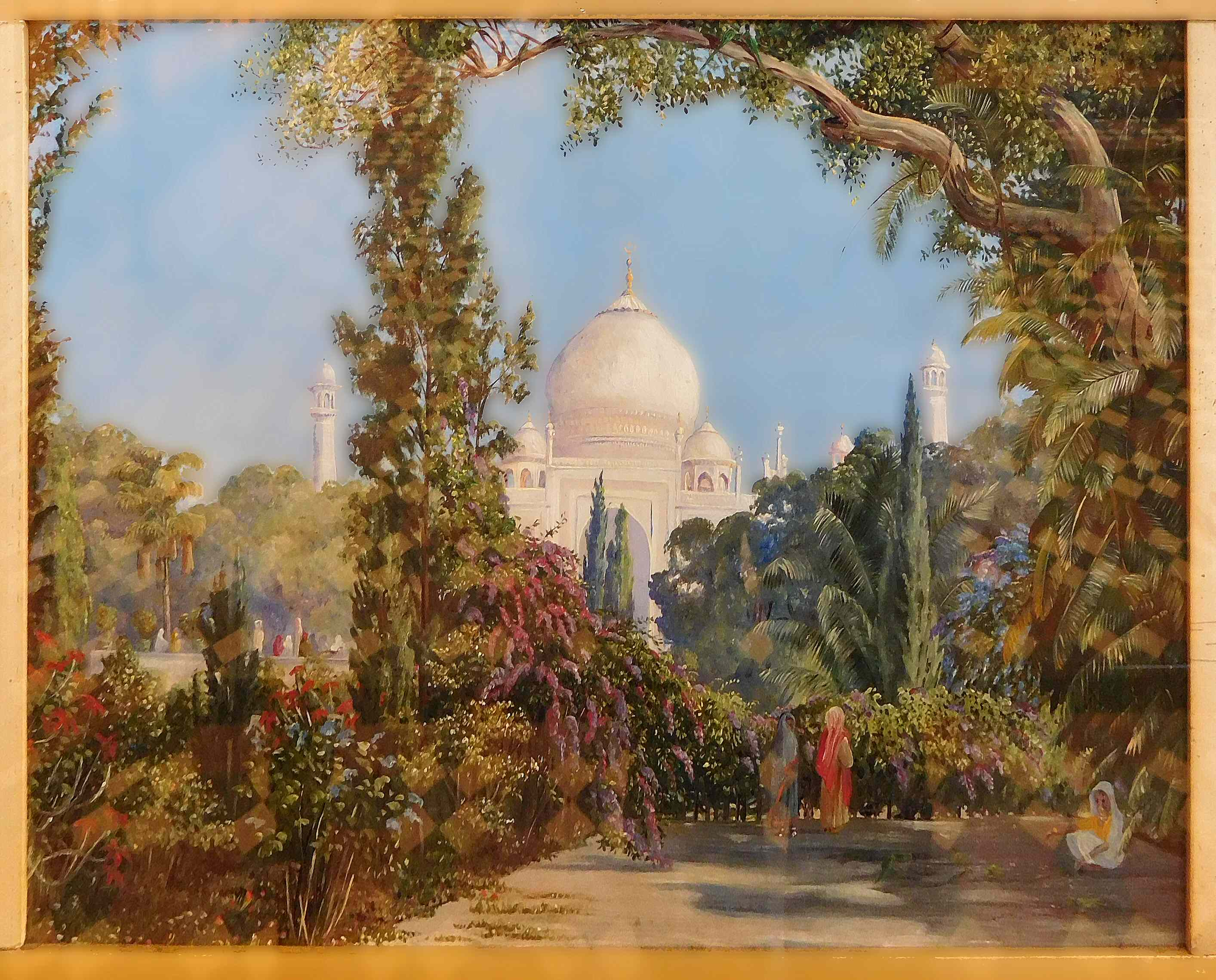
The Taj Mahal at Agra, North West India, Marianne North Gallery, Kew Gardens

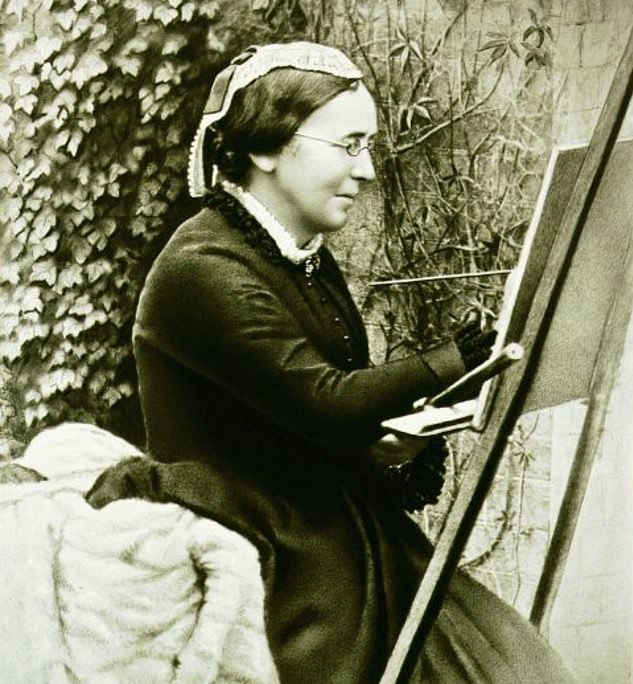
Marianne North in 1886

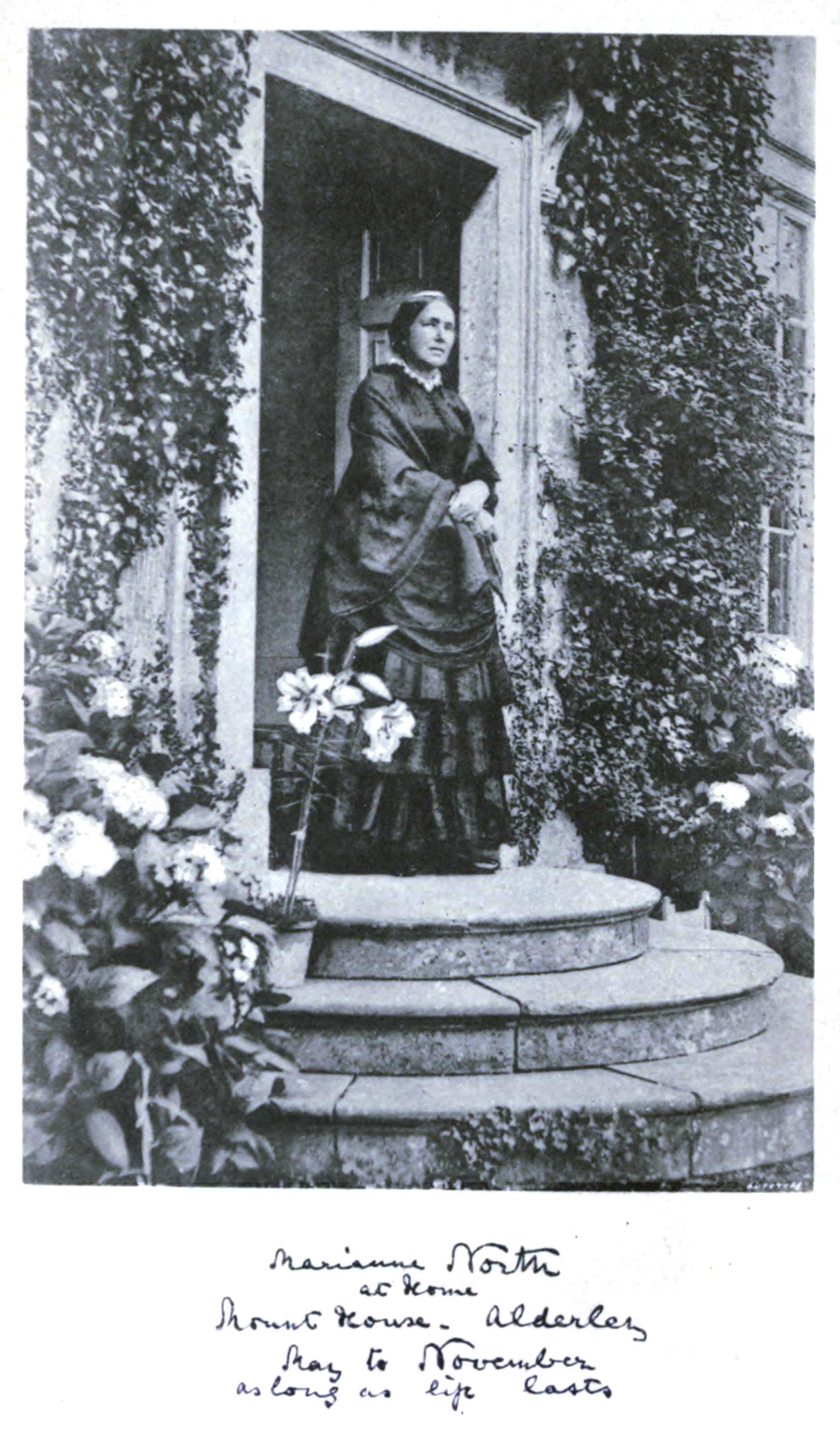
Photograph of North at her home in Mount House, Alderley c. 1867 taken by Mrs Susan Hodgson
