= Kniphofia nana =

Scientific classification
- Kingdom: Plantae
- Clade: Tracheophytes
- Clade: Angiosperms
- Clade: Monocots
- Order: Asparagales
- Family: Asphodelaceae
- Subfamily: Asphodeloideae
- Genus: Kniphofia
- Species: K. nana

Binomial name
- Kniphofia nana Marais

Species of flowering plant

Kniphofia nana is a species of flowering plant in the family Asphodeloideae. It is endemic to Zaïre (Democratic Republic of the Congo) in central Africa.
