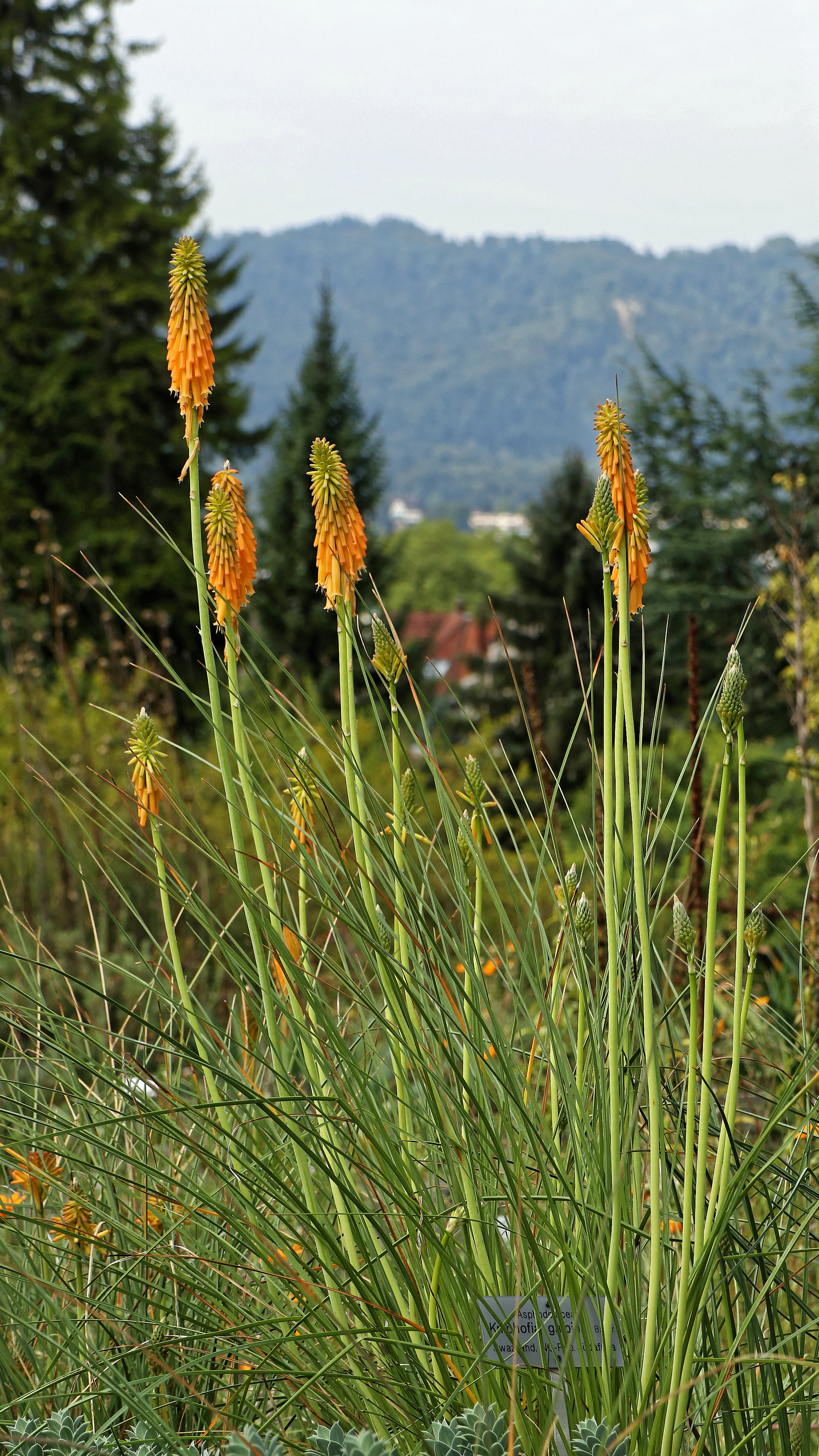
- In bloom

Scientific classification
- Kingdom: Plantae
- Clade: Embryophytes
- Clade: Tracheophytes
- Clade: Angiosperms
- Clade: Monocots
- Order: Asparagales
- Family: Asphodelaceae
- Subfamily: Asphodeloideae
- Genus: Kniphofia
- Species: K. galpinii

Binomial name
- Kniphofia galpinii Baker

= Kniphofia galpinii =

Species of flowering plant

Kniphofia galpinii, called the Galpin red-hot poker, is a species of flowering plant in the genus Kniphofia, native to Eswatini and South Africa. It has gained the Royal Horticultural Society's Award of Garden Merit.
