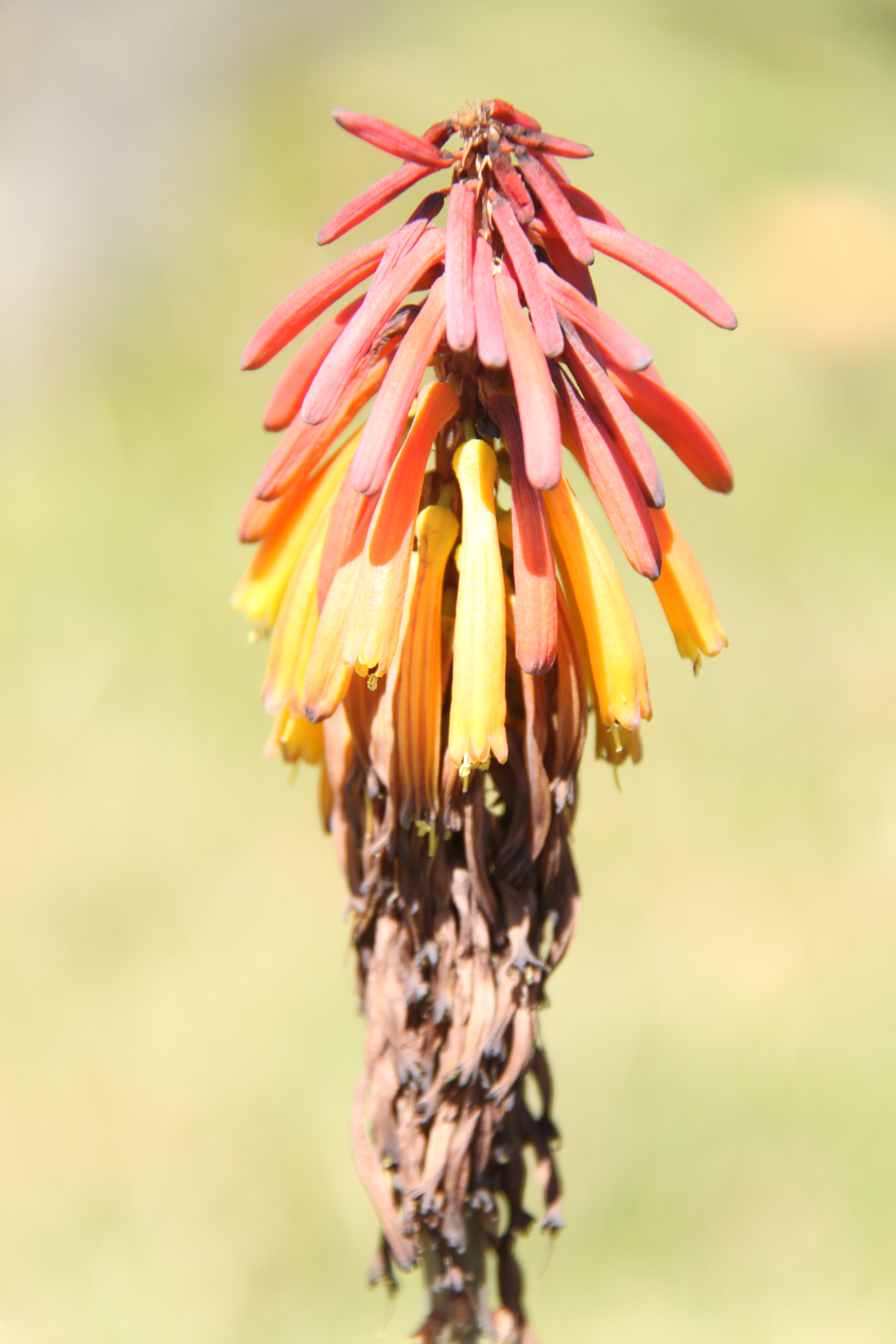
- Inflorescence

Scientific classification
- Kingdom: Plantae
- Clade: Embryophytes
- Clade: Tracheophytes
- Clade: Spermatophytes
- Clade: Angiosperms
- Clade: Monocots
- Order: Asparagales
- Family: Asphodelaceae
- Subfamily: Asphodeloideae
- Genus: Kniphofia
- Species: K. thomsonii

Binomial name
- Kniphofia thomsonii Baker

Synonyms
- Kniphofia rogersii E.A.Bruce; Kniphofia snowdenii C.H.Wright; Kniphofia subalpina Chiov.

= Kniphofia thomsonii =

Species of flowering plant

Kniphofia thomsonii, called Thomson's red-hot poker, is a species of flowering plant in the family Asphodelaceae, native to the Great Lakes countries of Africa. Its cultivar 'Stern's Trip' has gained the Royal Horticultural Society's Award of Garden Merit.

== Subtaxa ==
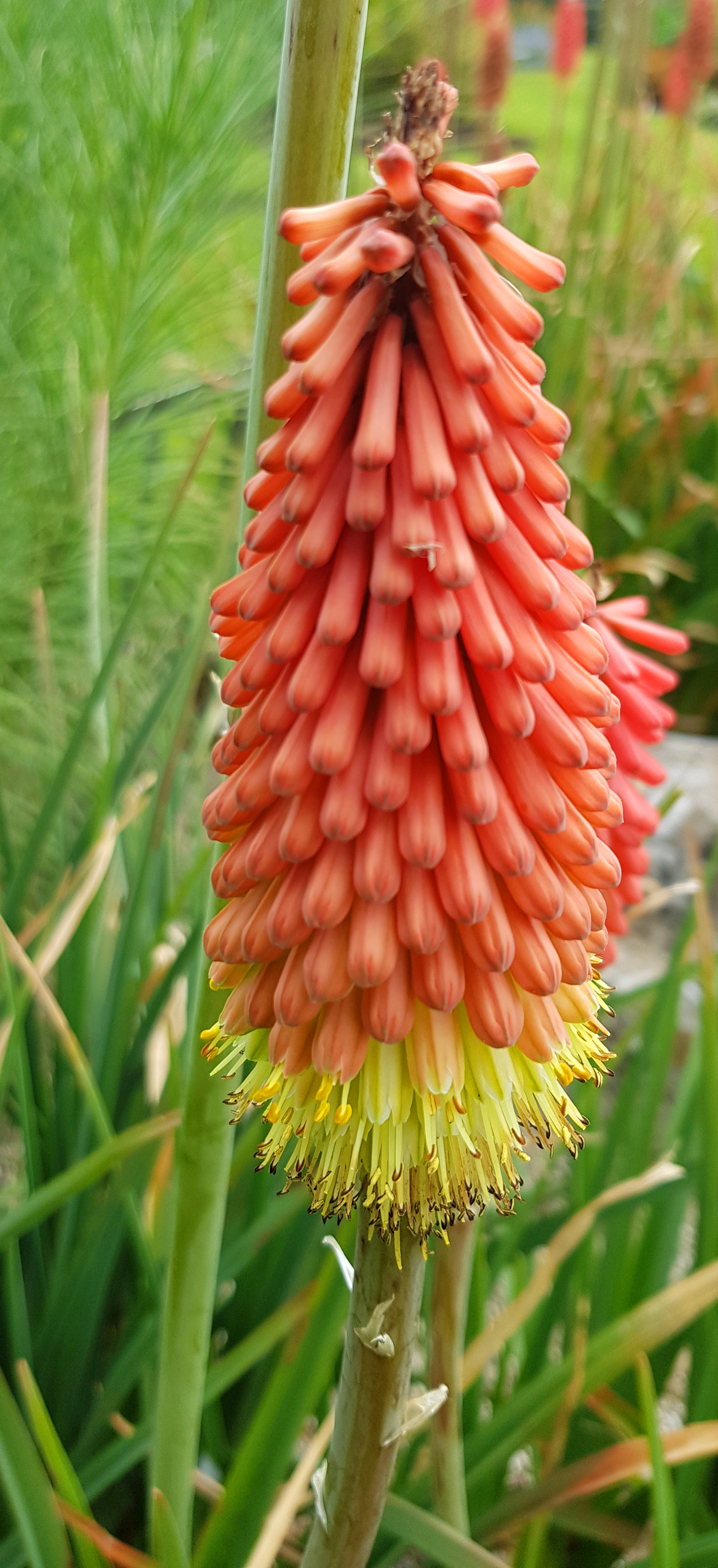
Kniphofia thomsonii var. Snowdenii

The following varieties are accepted:

- Kniphofia thomsonii var. snowdenii (C.H.Wright) Marais – Kenya, Uganda
- Kniphofia thomsonii var. thomsonii – Kenya, Tanzania, Democratic Republic of the Congo, Ethiopia
