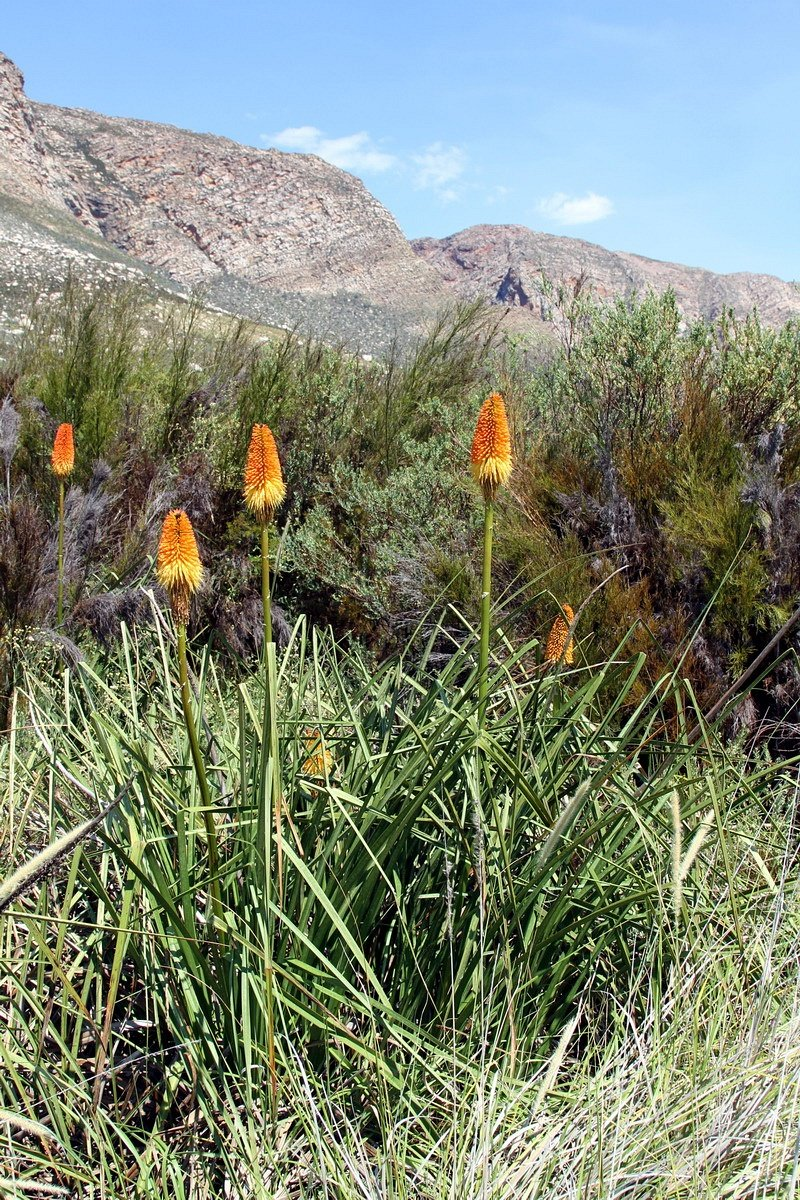
- Kniphofia uvaria

Scientific classification
- Kingdom: Plantae
- Clade: Tracheophytes
- Clade: Angiosperms
- Clade: Monocots
- Order: Asparagales
- Family: Asphodelaceae
- Subfamily: Asphodeloideae
- Genus: Kniphofia; Moench

Synonyms
- Notosceptrum Benth.; Rudolpho-roemeria Steud. ex Hochst.; Triclissa Salisb.; Triocles Salisb.; Tritoma Ker Gawl.; Tritomanthe Link; Tritomium Link

= Kniphofia =

Genus of perennial flowering plants

Kniphofia (/nɪpˈhoʊfiə/, /nɪˈfoʊfiə/, /nɪfˈoʊfiə/) is a genus of perennial flowering plants in the family Asphodelaceae, first described as a genus in 1794. All species of Kniphofia are native to Africa. Common names include tritoma, red hot poker, torch lily and poker plant.

== Description ==
The genus has herbaceous and evergreen species. The herbaceous species and hybrids have narrow, grass-like leaves 10–100 cm (4–39 in) long, while evergreen species have broader, strap-shaped foliage up to 1.5 m (5 ft) long. All plants produce spikes of upright, brightly coloured flowers well above the foliage, in shades of red, orange and yellow, often bicoloured. The flowers produce copious nectar while blooming and are attractive to bees and nectar-feeding birds such as sugarbirds and sunbirds. The Ethiopian wolf (Canis simensis) has been observed to feed on the nectar produced by Kniphofia foliosa with the researchers claiming it is only large carnivore known to eat nectar, suggesting it may aid the plant's pollination. In the New World, their flowers may attract nectarivores such as hummingbirds and New World orioles.

== Taxonomy ==
The genus Kniphofia was first erected by Conrad Moench in 1794. Moench considered the species he was describing (now Kniphofia uvaria) sufficiently different from Carl Linnaeus's genus Aletris and from Veltheimia to warrant a new genus. The name honours Johann Hieronymus Kniphof, an 18th-century German physician and botanist.

=== Species ===
As of February 2025, Plants of the World Online accepted 73 species, including two hybrids.

- Kniphofia acraea Codd – Cape Provinces of South Africa
- Kniphofia albescens Codd – Mpumalanga, KwaZulu-Natal
- Kniphofia albomontana Baijnath – Lesotho, South Africa
- Kniphofia angustifolia (Baker) Codd – KwaZulu-Natal
- Kniphofia ankaratrensis Baker – Madagascar
- Kniphofia baurii Baker – KwaZulu-Natal, Cape Provinces
- Kniphofia benguellensis Welw. ex Baker – Angola, Zambia
- Kniphofia bequaertii De Wild. – Zaire, Tanzania, Burundi, Rwanda, Uganda
- Kniphofia brachystachya (Zahlbr.) Codd – Lesotho, KwaZulu-Natal, Cape Provinces
- Kniphofia breviflora Harv. ex Baker – KwaZulu-Natal, Free State
- Kniphofia bruceae (Codd) Codd – Cape Province
- Kniphofia buchananii Baker – KwaZulu-Natal
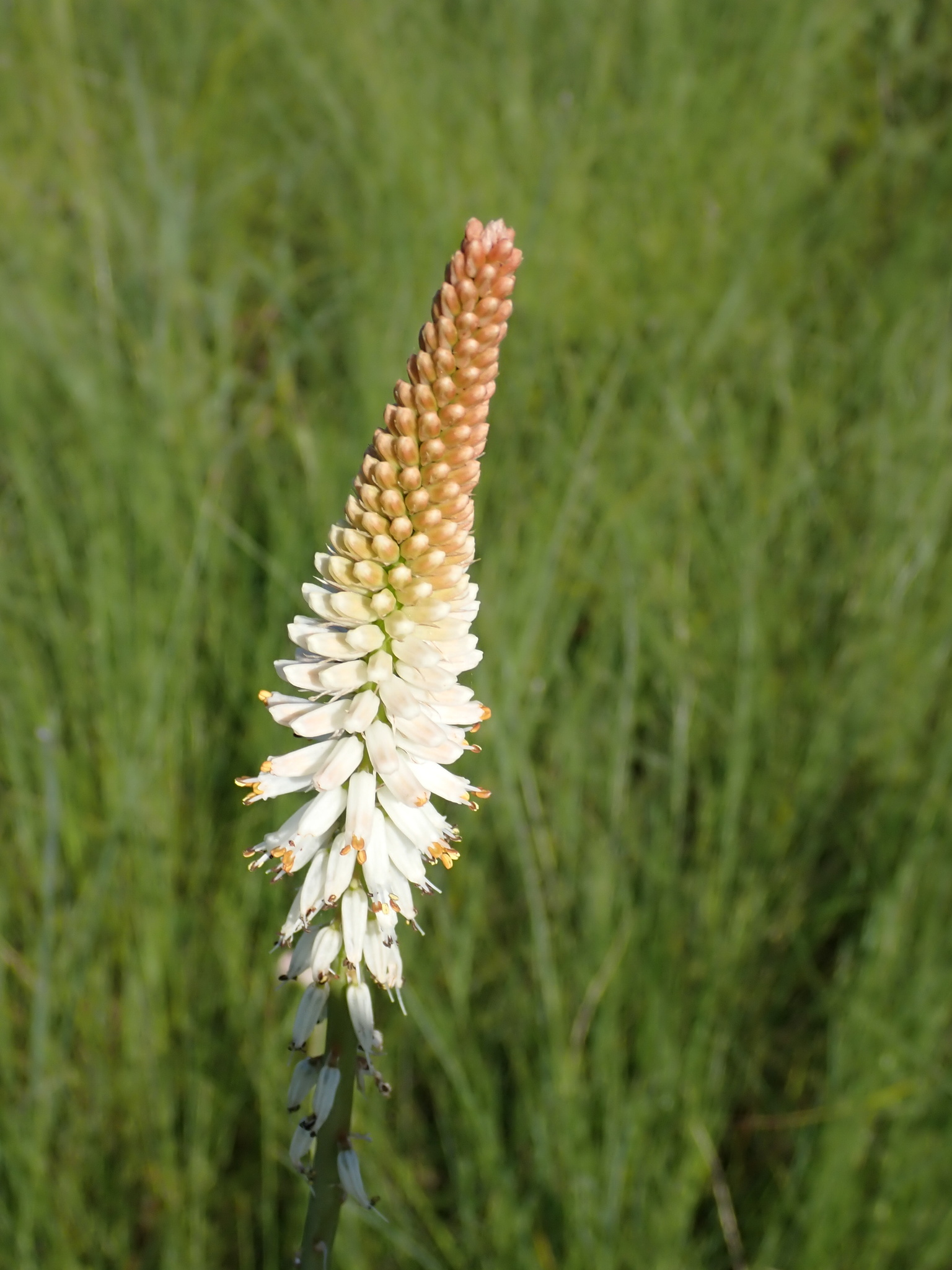
  Kniphofia buchananii
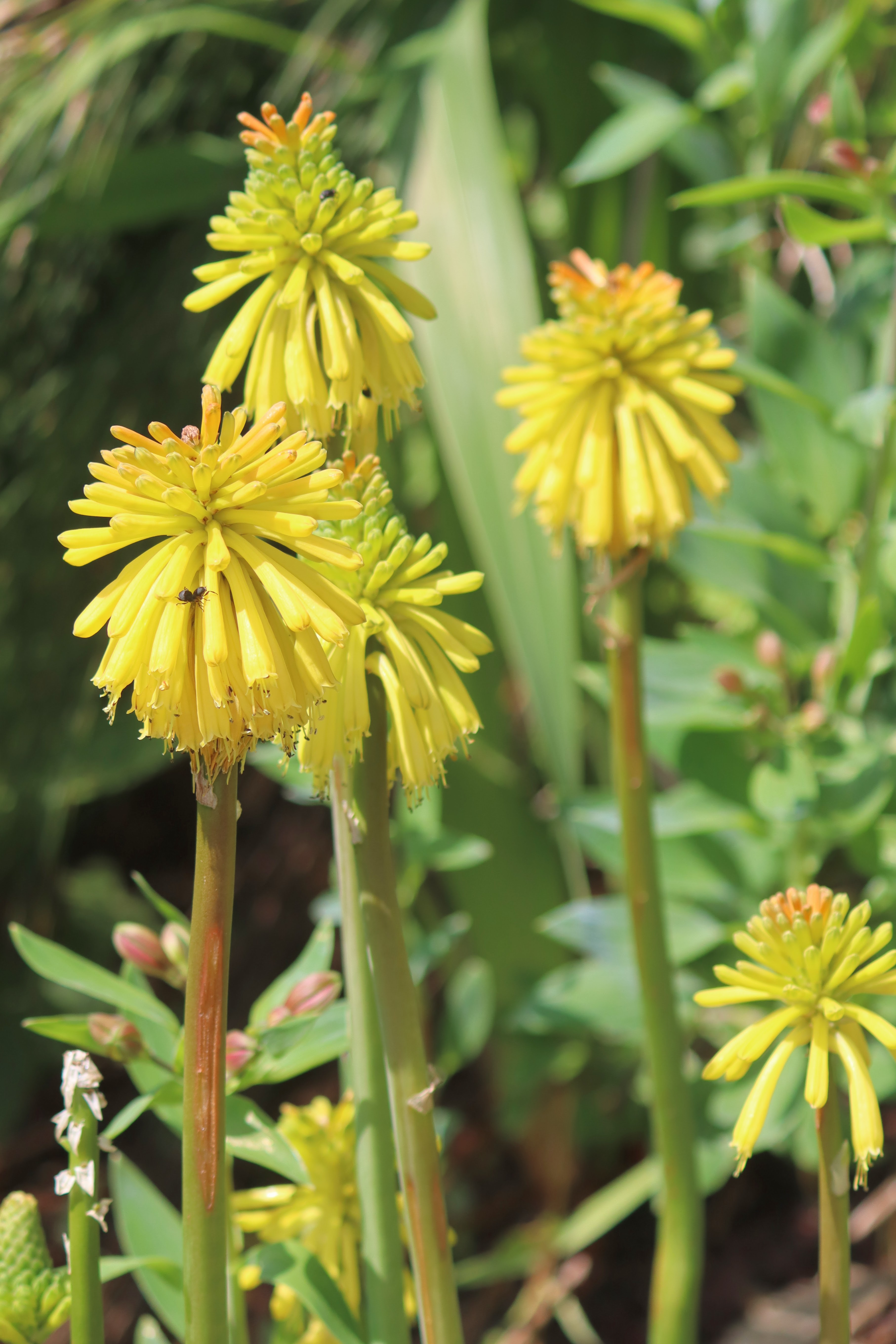
  Kniphofia drepanophylla, Jardin exotique de Roscoff
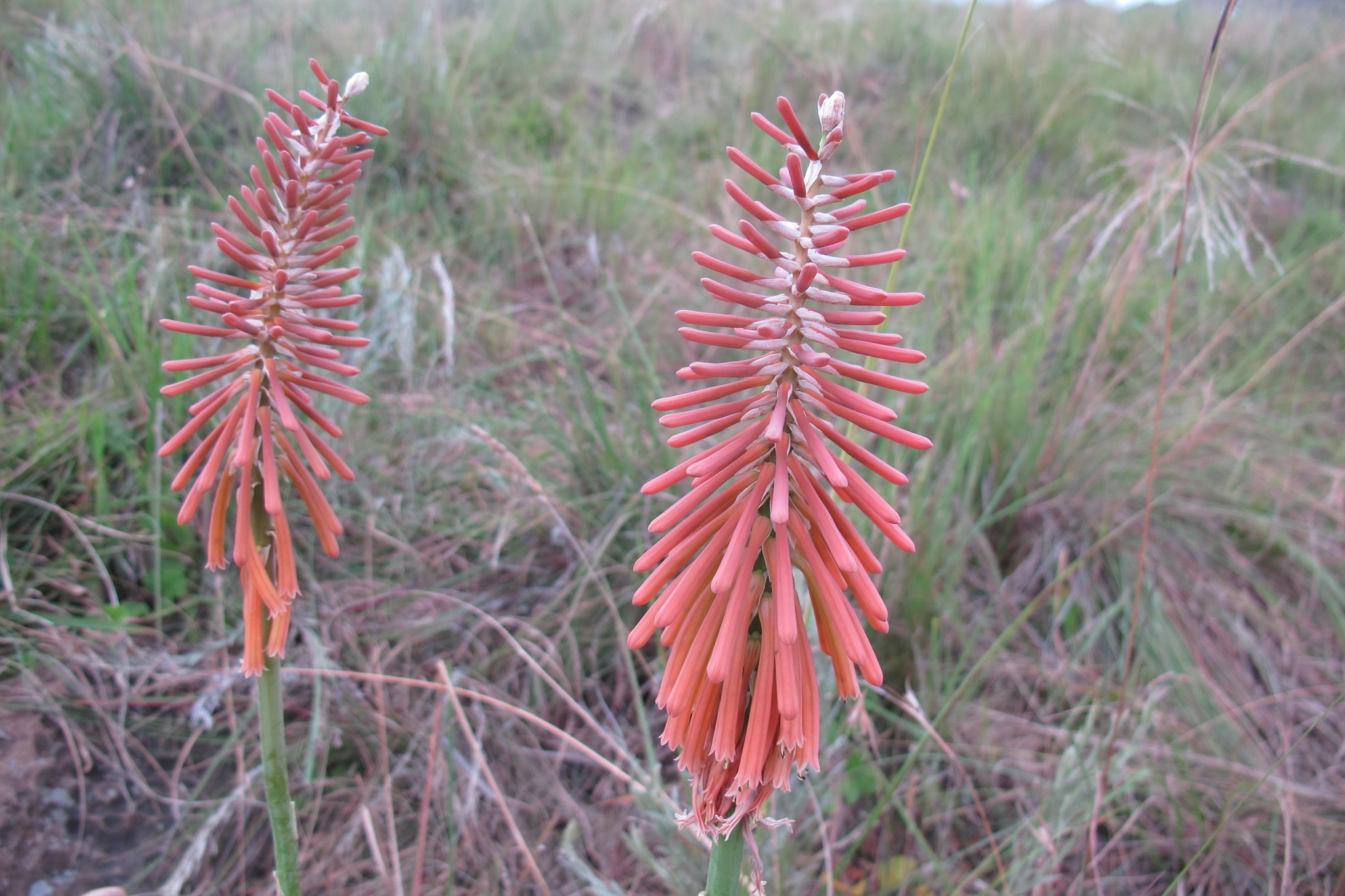
  Kniphofia laxiflora
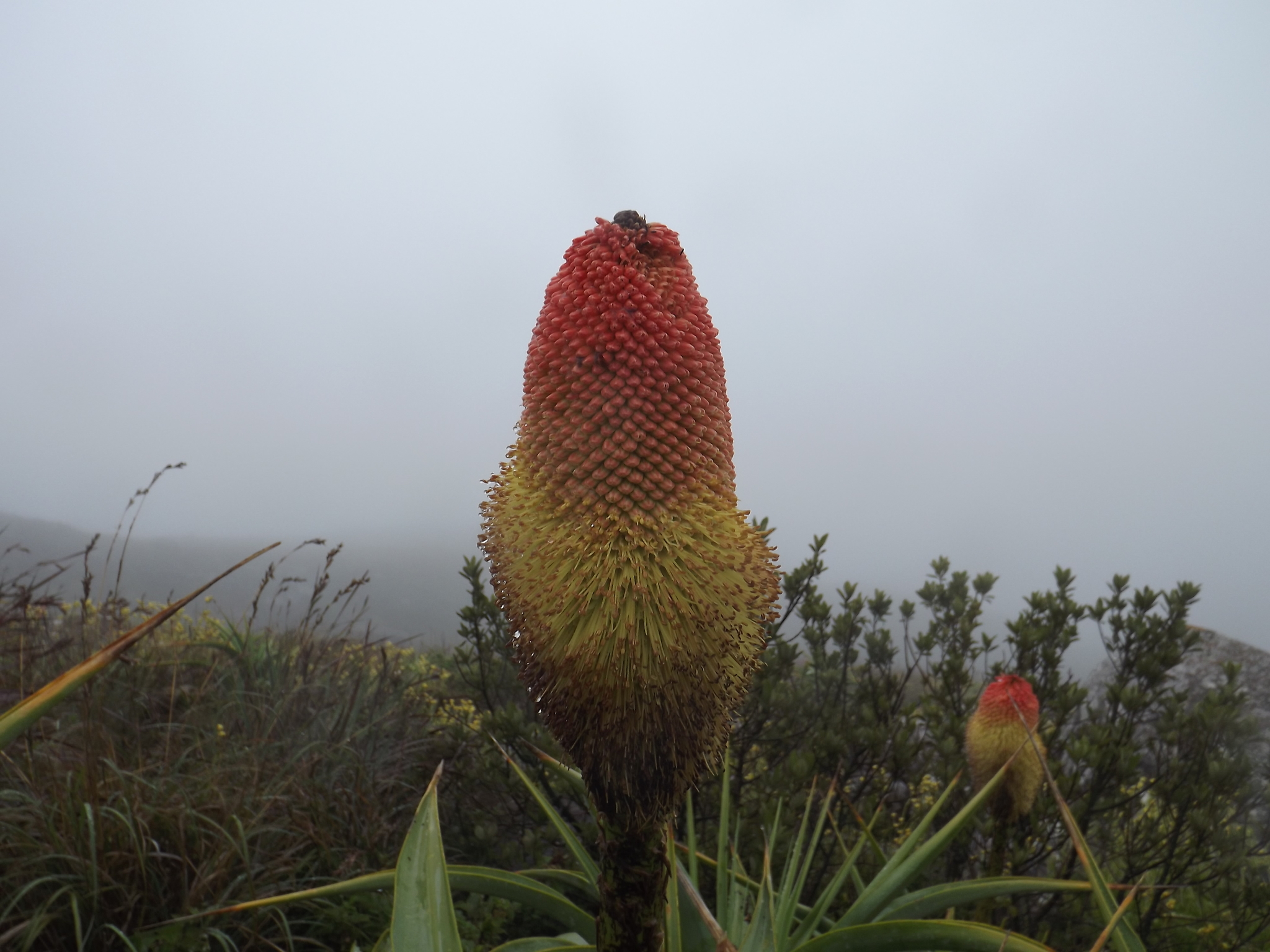
  Kniphofia northiae
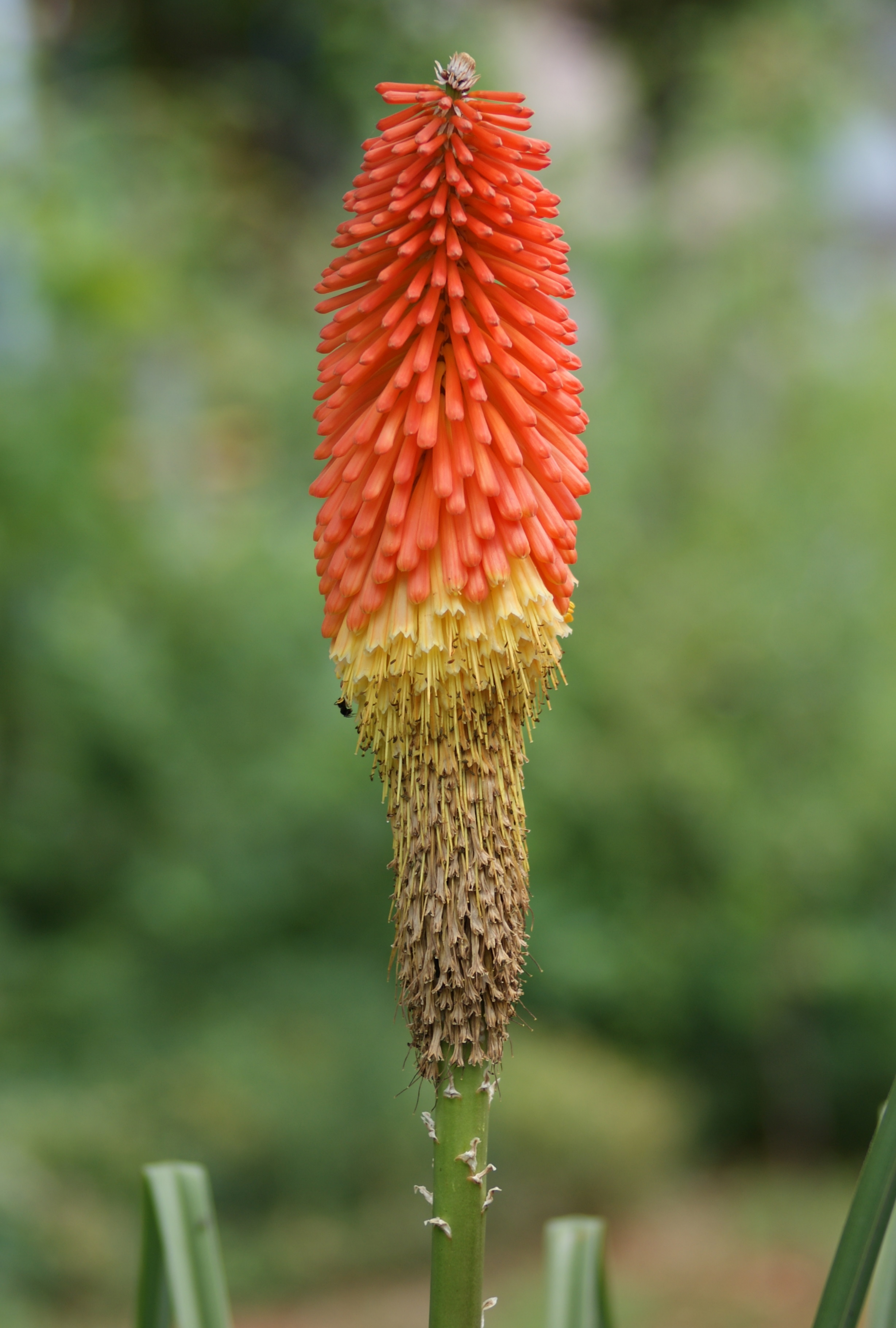
  Kniphofia uvaria
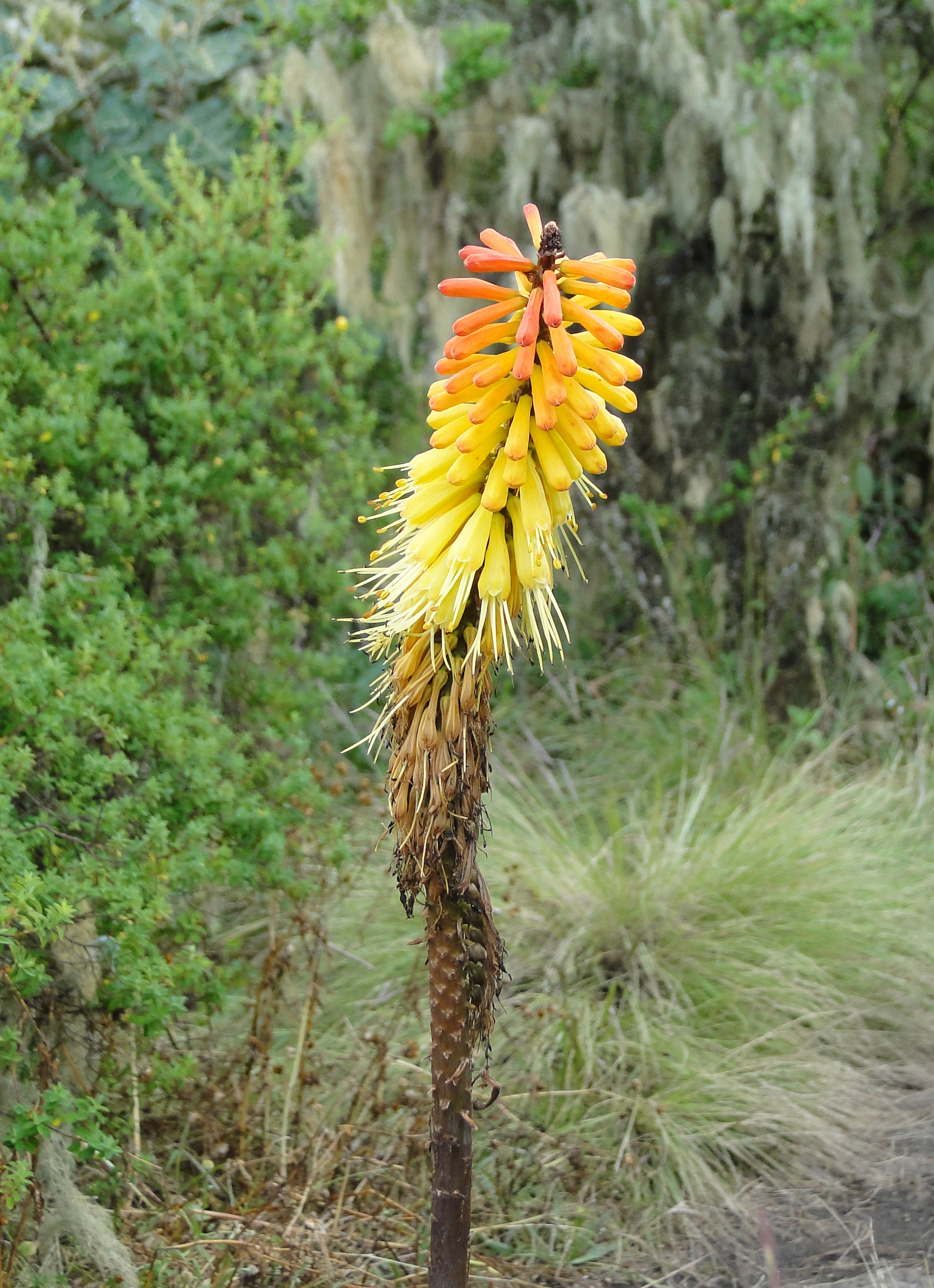
  Kniphofia foliosa
- Kniphofia caulescens Baker – Lesotho, KwaZulu-Natal, Cape Province, Free State
- Kniphofia citrina Baker – Cape Province
- Kniphofia coddiana Cufod. – KwaZulu-Natal, Cape Province
- Kniphofia coralligemma E.A.Bruce – Limpopo
- Kniphofia crassifolia Baker – Limpopo
- Kniphofia drepanophylla Baker – KwaZulu-Natal, Cape Provinces
- Kniphofia dubia De Wild – Zaire, Tanzania, Zambia, Angola
- Kniphofia ensifolia Baker – South Africa
- Kniphofia × erythraeae Fiori – Eritrea (K. pumila × K. schimperi)
- Kniphofia evansii Baker – KwaZulu-Natal
- Kniphofia fibrosa Baker – KwaZulu-Natal, Cape Provinces
- Kniphofia flammula Codd – KwaZulu-Natal
- Kniphofia fluviatilis Codd – South Africa
- Kniphofia foliosa Hochst. – Ethiopia
- Kniphofia galpinii Baker – KwaZulu-Natal, Eswatini, Mpumalanga
- Kniphofia goetzei Engl. – Tanzania
- Kniphofia gracilis Harv. ex Baker – KwaZulu-Natal, Cape Provinces
- Kniphofia grantii Baker – Zaire, Tanzania, Zambia, Rwanda, Burundi, Uganda, Malawi
- Kniphofia hildebrandtii Cufod. – Ethiopia
- Kniphofia hirsuta Codd – Lesotho, Cape Provinces
- Kniphofia ichopensis Schinz – KwaZulu-Natal
- Kniphofia insignis Rendle – Ethiopia
- Kniphofia isoetifolia Hochst. – Ethiopia
- Kniphofia latifolia Codd – KwaZulu-Natal
- Kniphofia laxiflora Kunth – KwaZulu-Natal, Cape Provinces
- Kniphofia leucocephala Baijnath – KwaZulu-Natal
- Kniphofia linearifolia Baker – Malawi, Mozambique, Zimbabwe, Lesotho, Eswatini, South Africa
- Kniphofia littoralis Codd – KwaZulu-Natal
- Kniphofia marungensis Lisowski & Wiland – Zaire
- Kniphofia mulanjeana S.Blackmore – Mt. Mulanje in Malawi
- Kniphofia multiflora J.M.Wood & M.S.Evans – Eswatini, South Africa
- Kniphofia nana Marais – Zaire
- Kniphofia northiae Baker – KwaZulu-Natal, Cape Provinces
- Kniphofia nubigena Mildbr. – Sudan
- Kniphofia pallidiflora Baker – Massif de l' Ankaratra in Madagascar
- Kniphofia paludosa Engl – Elton Plateau in Tanzania
- Kniphofia parviflora Kunth – KwaZulu-Natal, Cape Provinces
- Kniphofia pauciflora Baker – KwaZulu-Natal
- Kniphofia porphyrantha Baker – Lesotho, Eswatini, South Africa
- Kniphofia × praecox Baker – Cape Provinces (K. bruceae × K. uvaria)
- Kniphofia princeae (A.Berger) Marais – Zaire, Tanzania, Uganda, Rwanda, Malawi
- Kniphofia pumila (Aiton) Kunth – Zaire, Kenya, Uganda, South Sudan, Ethiopia, Eritrea
- Kniphofia reflexa Hutch. ex Codd – Nigeria, Cameroon (endangered)
- Kniphofia reynoldsii Codd – Tanzania, Zambia
- Kniphofia rigidifolia E.A.Bruce – Mpumalanga
- Kniphofia ritualis Codd – Free State, Lesotho, KwaZulu-Natal
- Kniphofia rooperi (T.Moore) Lem. – KwaZulu-Natal, Cape Provinces
- Kniphofia sarmentosa (Andrews) Kunth – Cape Provinces
- Kniphofia schimperi Baker – Ethiopia, Eritrea
- Kniphofia splendida E.A.Bruce – Malawi, Mozambique, Zimbabwe, northeastern South Africa, Eswatini
- Kniphofia stricta Codd – Cape Provinces, Lesotho
- Kniphofia sumarae Deflers – Ibb Mountains of Yemen
- Kniphofia tabularis Marloth – Cape Provinces
- Kniphofia thodei Baker – Lesotho, KwaZulu-Natal
- Kniphofia thomsonii Baker – Zaire, Kenya, Uganda, Tanzania, Ethiopia
- Kniphofia triangularis Kunth – Lesotho, South Africa
- Kniphofia typhoides Codd – Limpopo, KwaZulu-Natal, Free State, Mpumalanga
- Kniphofia tysonii Baker – KwaZulu-Natal, Cape Provinces, Eswatini
- Kniphofia umbrina Codd – Eswatini
- Kniphofia uvaria (L.) Oken – Cape Provinces; naturalized in Mexico, North Carolina, Spain, Oregon, Turkey, Washington State, St. Helena, California
- Kniphofia vandeweghei Fischer & Ackermann – Rwanda

== Cultivation ==
Several species of Kniphofia are cultivated as garden plants, valued for their architectural properties. These include K. galpini, K. northiae, K. rooperi and K. thomsonii.

In addition to the species, many named cultivars of mixed or uncertain parentage have been selected for garden use. The following have gained the Royal Horticultural Society's Award of Garden Merit:

- 'Barton Fever' (orange-white, 100 cm)
- 'Bees' Sunset' (yellow, 90 cm)
- 'Brimstone' (sulphur yellow, 90 cm)
- 'Buttercup' (clear yellow, 75 cm)
- 'Coral Flame' (coral red, 90 cm)
- 'Fiery Fred' (orange, 130 cm)
- 'Incandesce' (orange, 140 cm)
- 'Innocence' (red-yellow, 110 cm)
- 'Jonathan' (red-orange, 130 cm)
- 'Moonstone' (yellow, 120 cm)
- 'Nobilis' (evergreen, orange and yellow, 150 cm+)
- 'Penny Rockets' (orange, 100 cm)
- 'Primrose Upward' (yellow, 115 cm)
- 'Rich Echoes' (orange-yellow, 120 cm)
- 'Royal Standard' (red and yellow, 90 cm)
- 'Safranvogel' (peach pink, 80 cm)
- 'Samuel's Sensation' (red-yellow, 150 cm)
- 'Sunningdale Yellow' (orange and yellow, 60 cm)
- 'Tawny King' (cream/brown, 120 cm)
- 'Timothy' (orange, 100 cm)
- 'Toffee Nosed' (cream/brown, 100 cm)
- 'Wrexham Buttercup' (yellow, 120 cm)

== Gallery ==
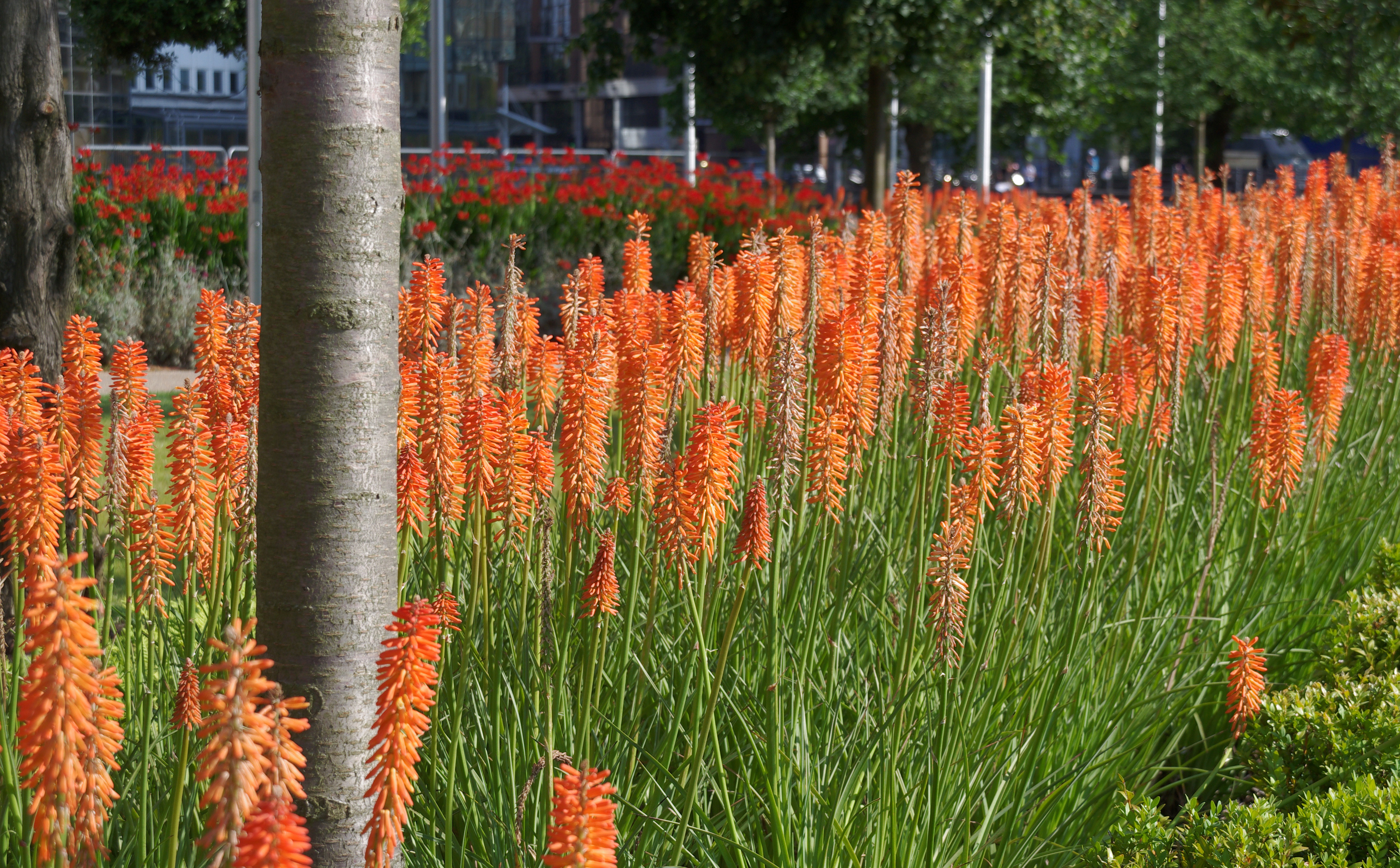
Kniphofia planted near Canary Wharf in London

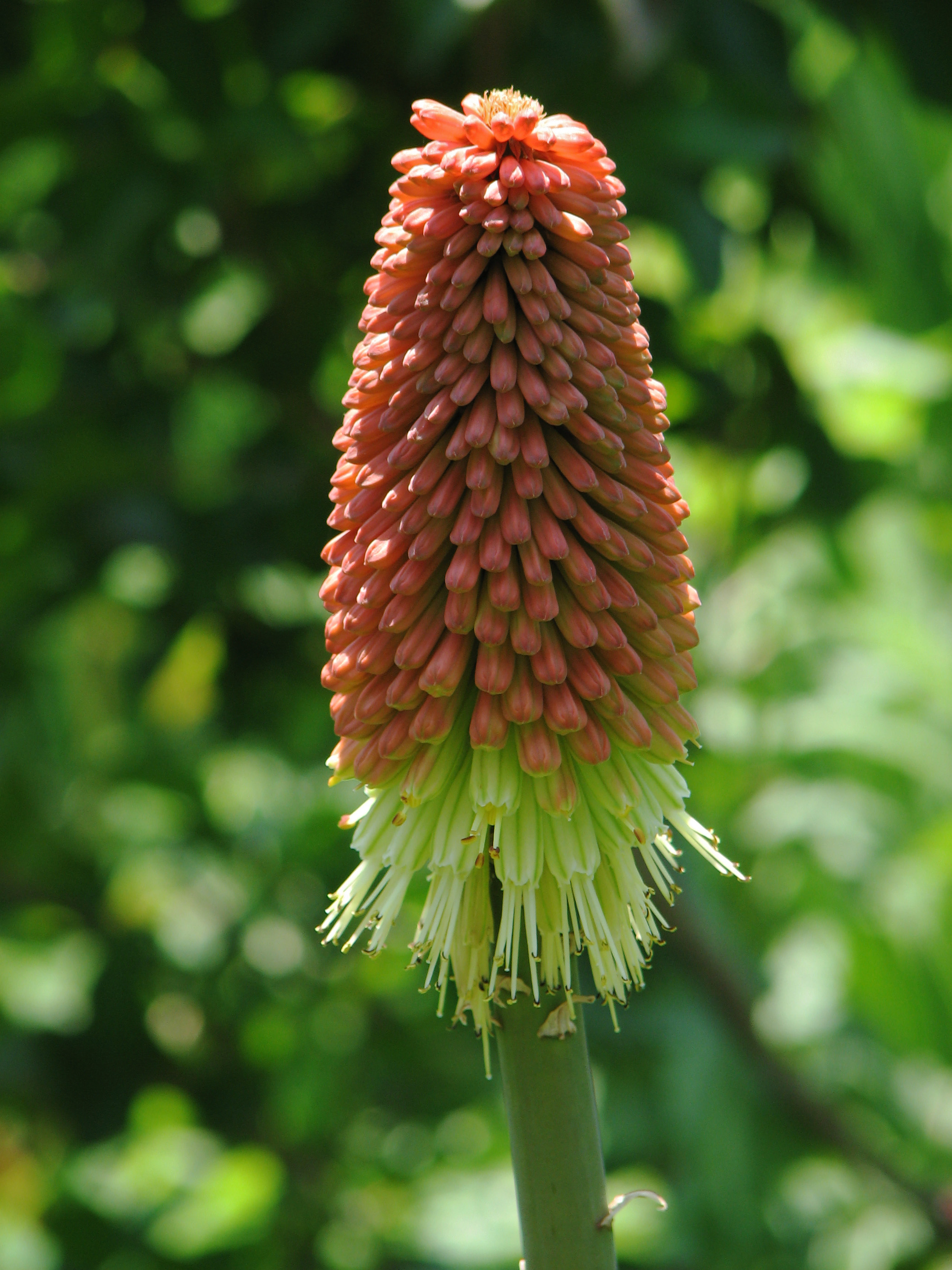
Kniphofia 'Shenandoah'

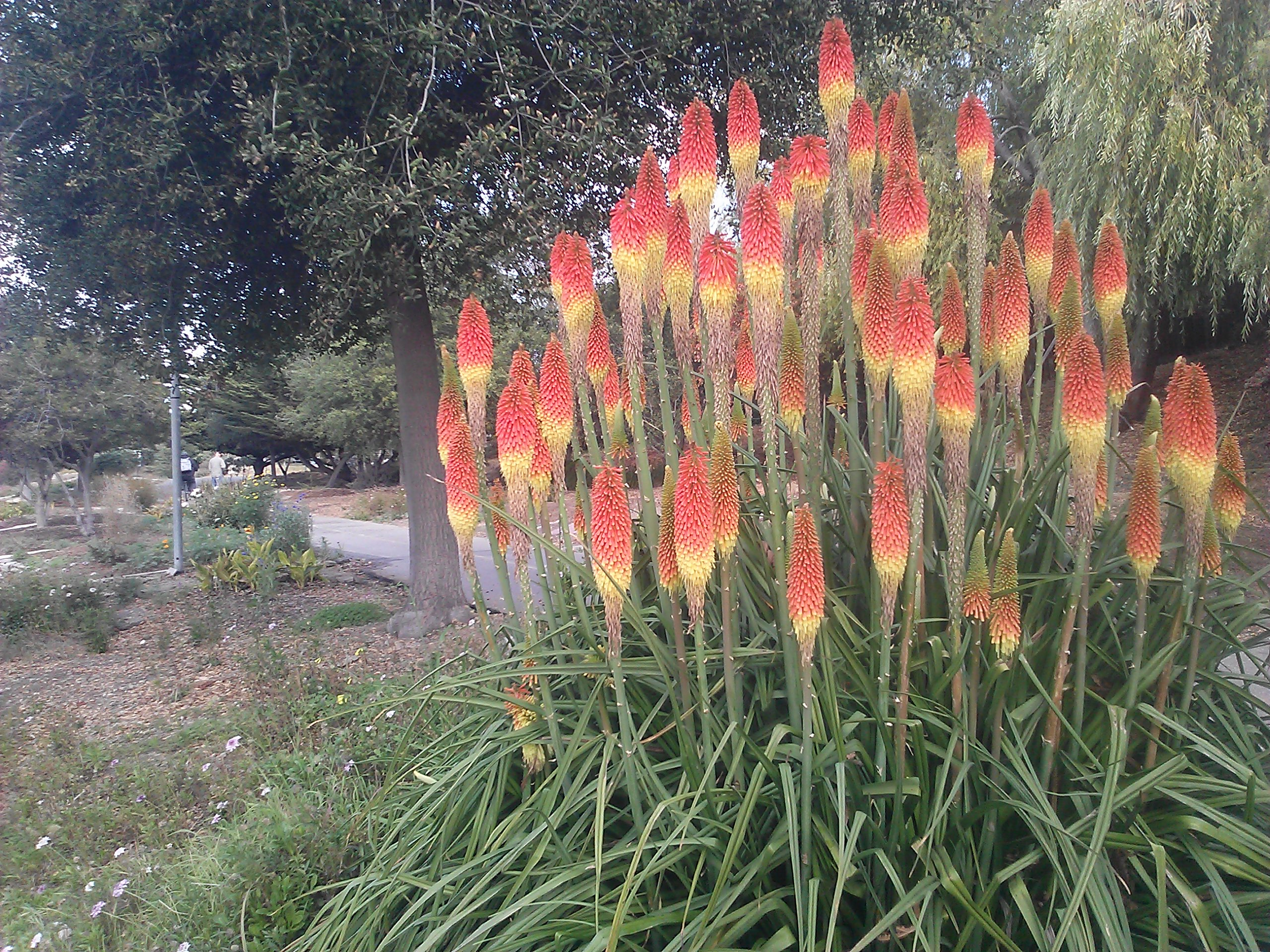
Kniphofia along the Ohlone Greenway trail in El Cerrito, California

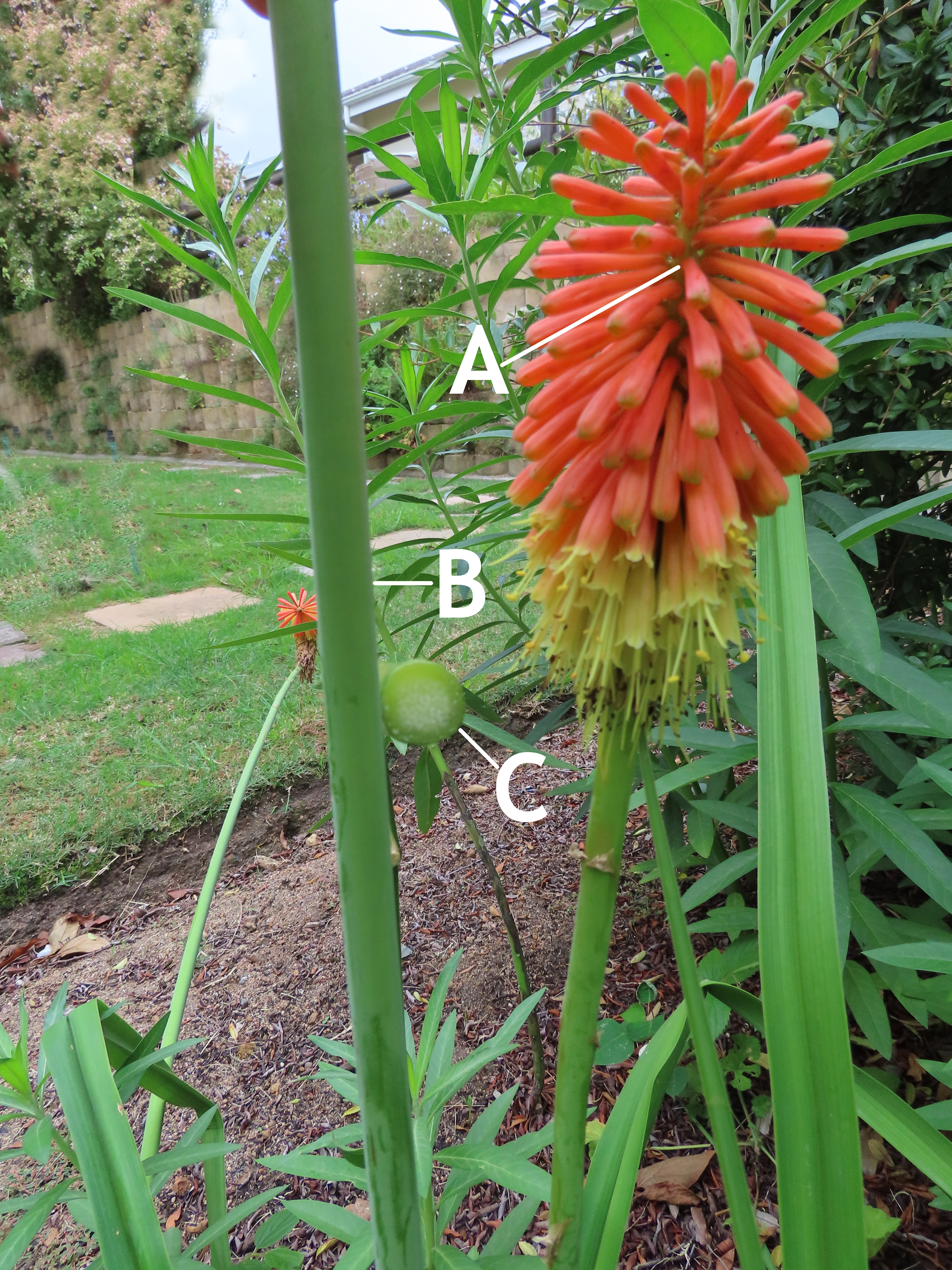
Terete raceme of Kniphofia shown together with a cross section of a peduncle. A: Inflorescence; B: Terete peduncle; C: Cross section of a terete peduncle

== See also ==
- List of plants known as lily
