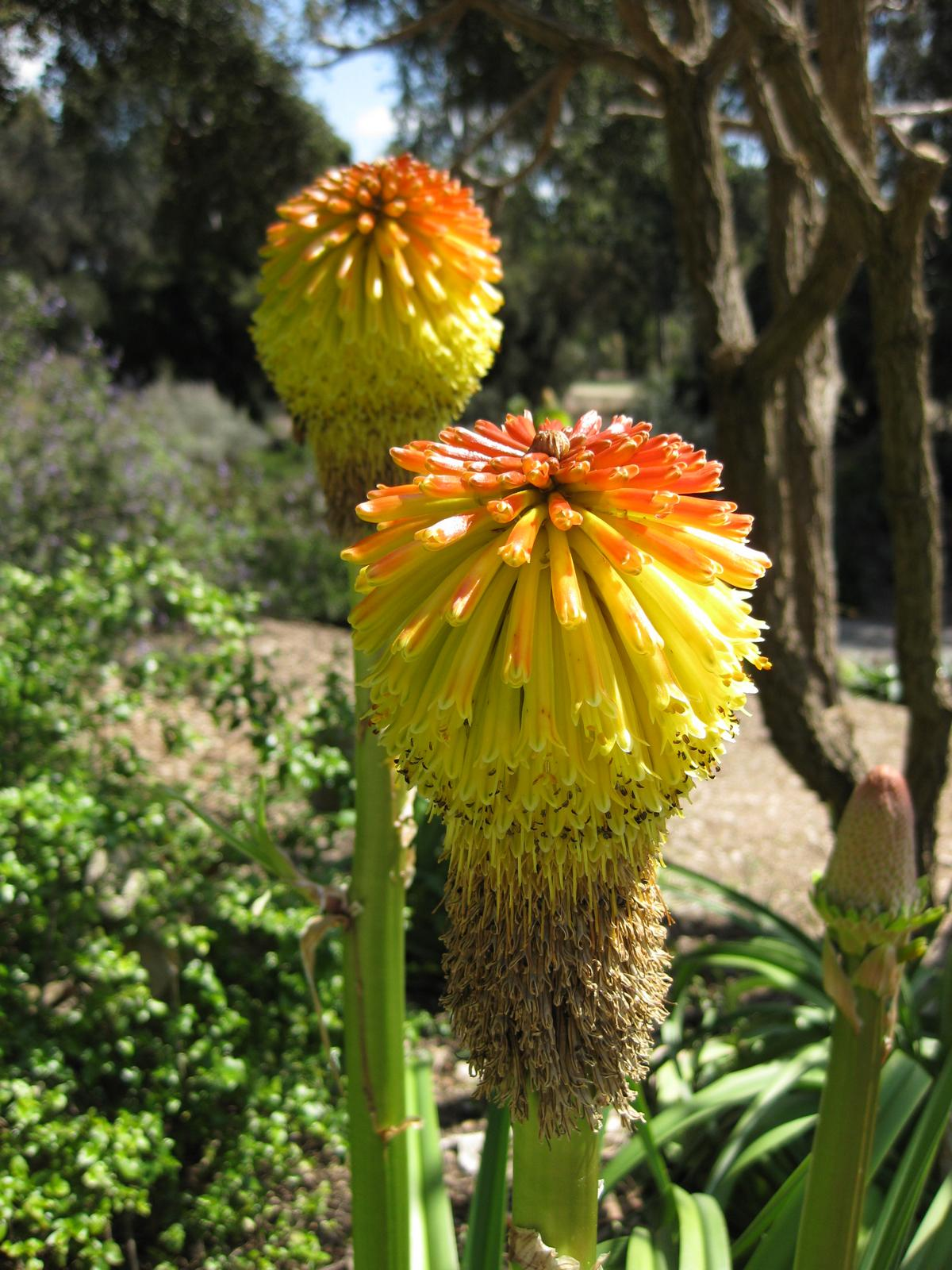

Scientific classification
- Kingdom: Plantae
- Clade: Tracheophytes
- Clade: Angiosperms
- Clade: Monocots
- Order: Asparagales
- Family: Asphodelaceae
- Subfamily: Asphodeloideae
- Genus: Kniphofia
- Species: K. rooperi

Binomial name
- Kniphofia rooperi (T.Moore) Lem.

Synonyms
- Homotypic Synonyms: Tritoma rooperi T.Moore; Tritoma uvaria var. rooperi (T.Moore) Rob.; Heterotypic Synonyms: Kniphofia longicollis Baker

= Kniphofia rooperi =

Species of flowering plant

Kniphofia rooperi is a species of flowering plant in the family Asphodelaceae. It is sometimes referred to by the common name Rooper's red-hot poker. It is native to the Eastern Cape of South Africa. Growing to 1.2 m (3.9 ft) tall, it is a robust evergreen perennial with strap-shaped leaves produced at an angle from the main stem. In autumn the stout central stems bear flattened oval flowerheads consisting of many tubular florets packed closely together. Green in bud, the flowers open to bright red and fade from the base to yellow and brown, thus giving the appearance of a red-hot poker.

K. rooperi is valued in horticulture for its architectural qualities and late season flowering, and is equally at home in the mixed flower border and in more naturalistic plantings. It is hardy down to −15 °C (5 °F). It requires a situation in full sun, which is reliably moist but well-drained. Excessive dryness may prevent flowerheads from forming, while bad drainage can cause the crown to rot. The evergreen foliage may become untidy during the winter months. It has gained the Royal Horticultural Society's Award of Garden Merit.
