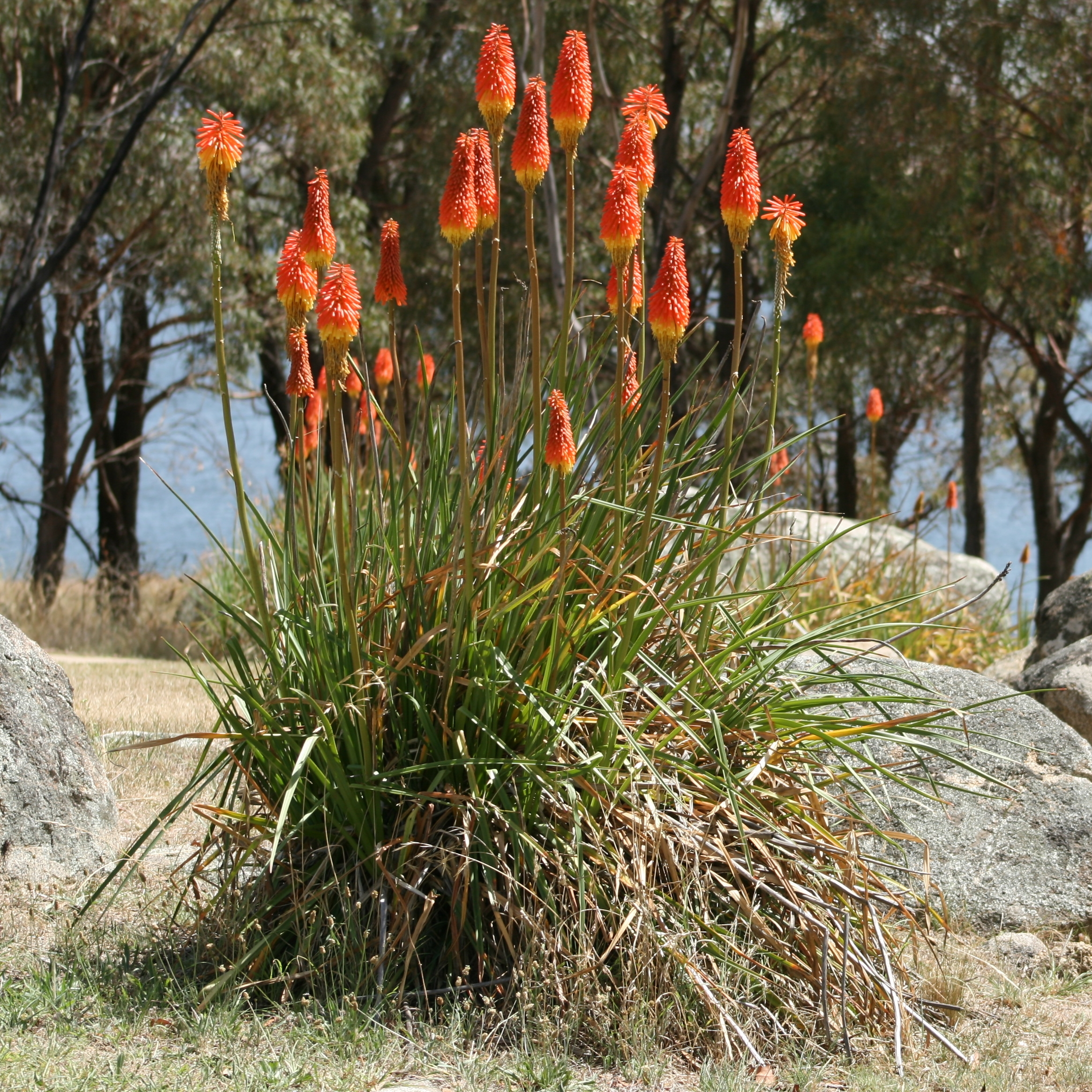

Scientific classification
- Kingdom: Plantae
- Clade: Embryophytes
- Clade: Tracheophytes
- Clade: Angiosperms
- Clade: Monocots
- Order: Asparagales
- Family: Asphodelaceae
- Subfamily: Asphodeloideae
- Genus: Kniphofia
- Species: K. uvaria

Binomial name
- Kniphofia uvaria (L.) Oken (1841)

= Kniphofia uvaria =

Species of flowering plant (red hot poker)

Kniphofia uvaria is a species of flowering plant in the family Asphodelaceae, commonly known as tritomea, torch lily, or red hot poker, due to the shape and color of its inflorescence. The leaves are reminiscent of a lily, and the flowerhead can reach up to 1.5 m (5 ft) in height. There are many varieties of torch lily, and they bloom at different times during the growing season. The flowers are red, orange, and yellow.

== Distribution ==
Kniphofia uvaria originates from the Cape Province of South Africa, and has been introduced into many parts of the world, such as North America, Australia, New Zealand, Patagonia and Europe as a garden plant. It is hardy in zones 5–10.

In parts of south-eastern Australia, such as the Central and Southern Tablelands of New South Wales and southern Victoria, it has escaped cultivation and become naturalised. It is now regarded as an environmental weed in these locations, spreading from former habitations into natural areas, where it can grow in thick clumps and threaten sensitive ecosystems. Elsewhere in southern Australia it is regarded as a potential environmental weed, and it may have also naturalised in parts of South Australia and California. It is also seen in the Kumaon Himalayas of India, probably brought during British colonial rule.

== Gallery ==
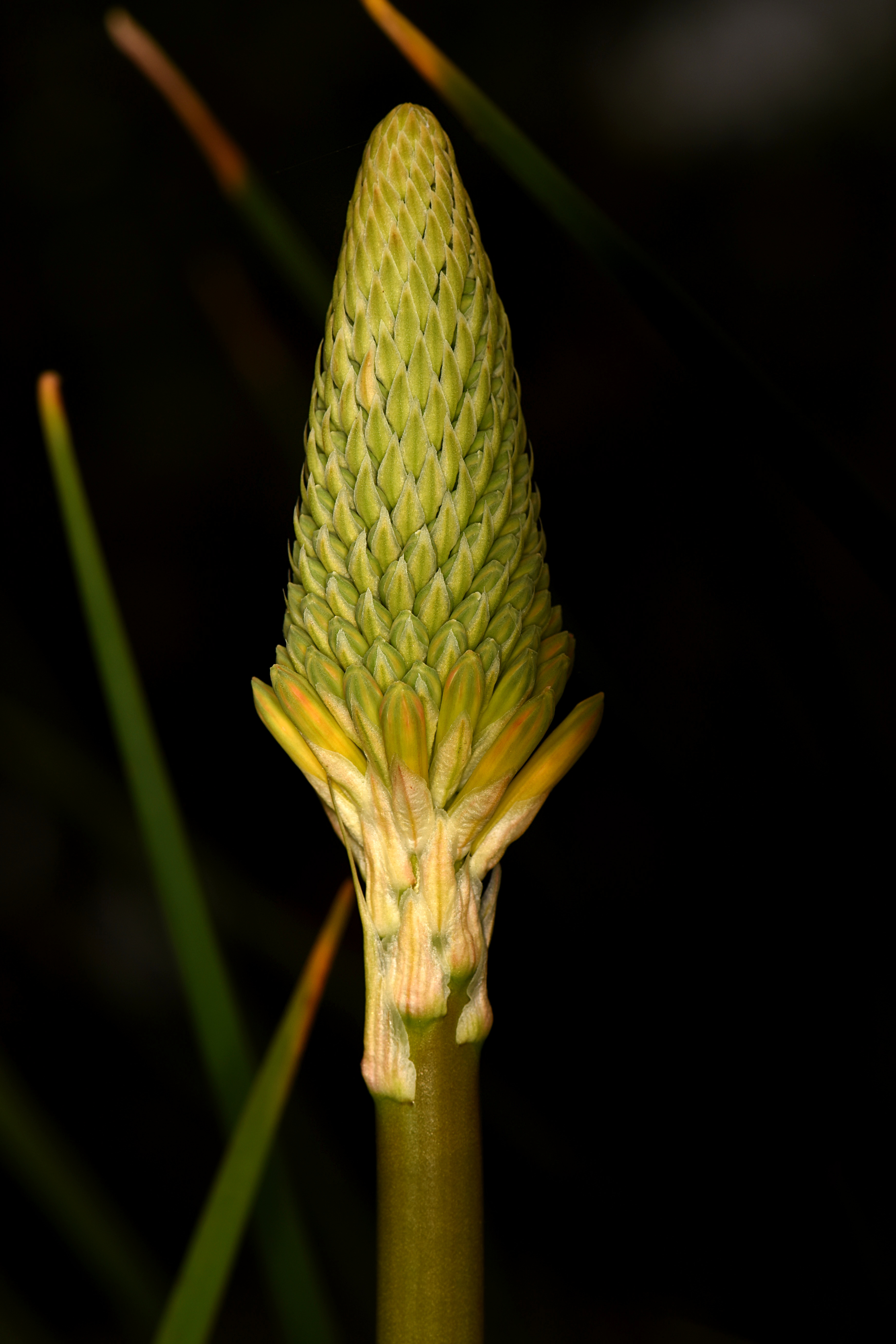
Young inflorescence

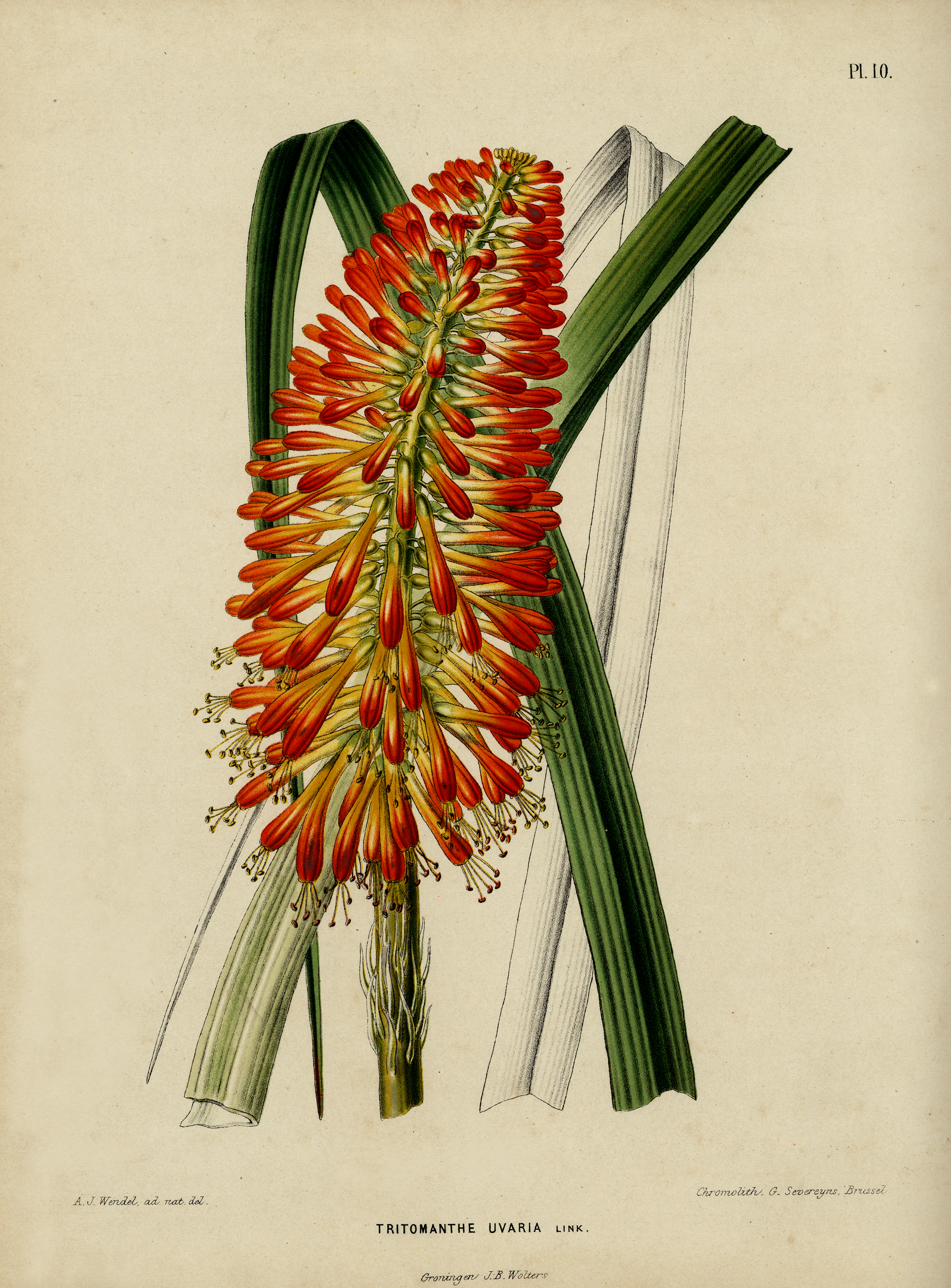
1868 illustration

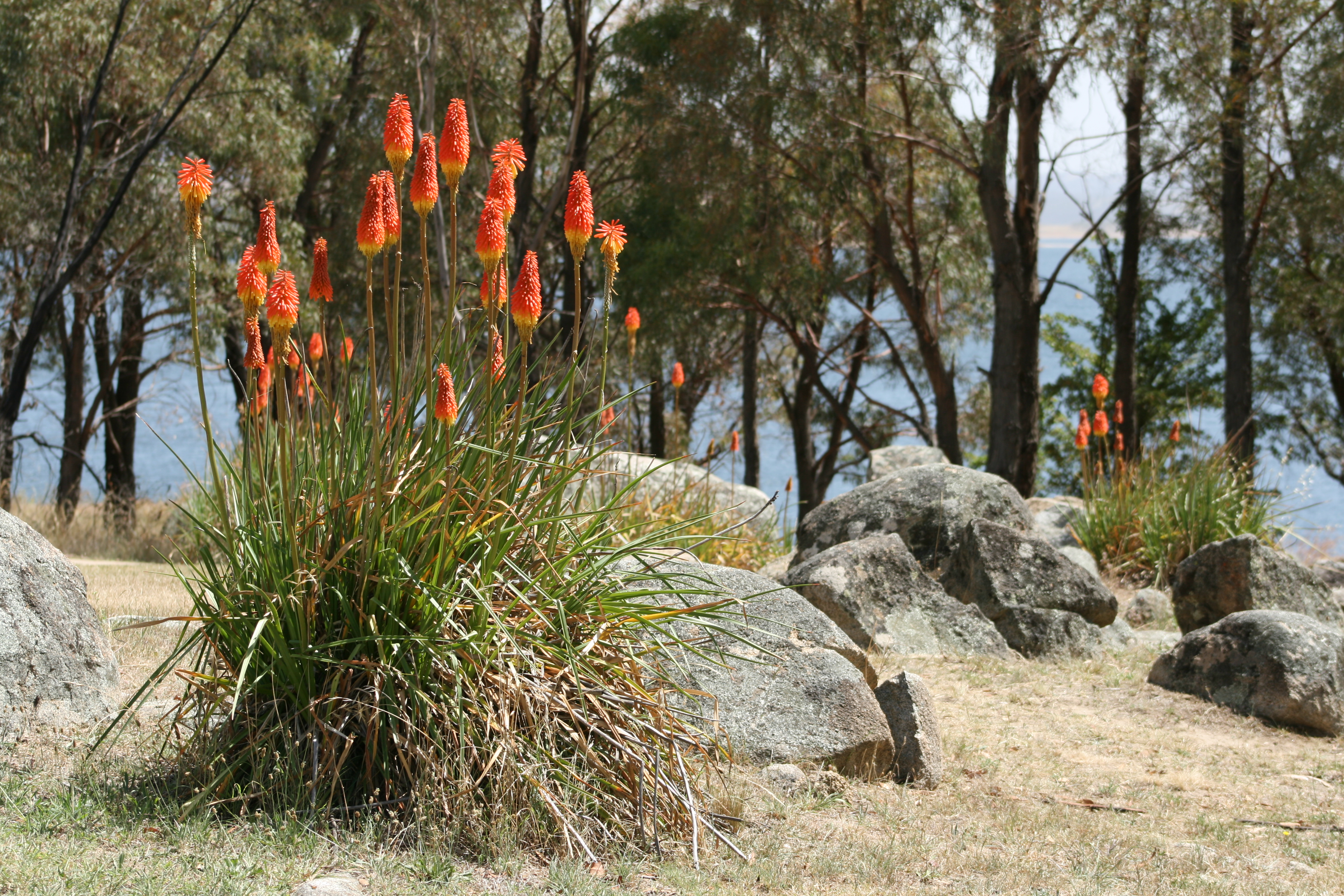
A clump on the shore of Lake Jindabyne in Australia, where it has become an invasive species
