= Potters Pass Nature Reserve =

Coastal reserve in the Eastern Cape

- Interactive map of Potters Pass Nature Reserve
- Type: Nature Reserve
- Location: Buffalo City Metropolitan Municipality
- Nearest city: East London, Eastern Cape
- Coordinates: 33°02′35″S 27°52′59″E
- Area: 77.95 ha
- Established: 24 January 1986
- Administrator: Eastern Cape Parks

The Potters Pass Nature Reserve is a coastal reserve in the Wild Coast region of the Eastern Cape. The reserve lies beside the Hood Point Lighthouse and the West Bank Golf Course.

== History ==
In 1973 land at the current reserve was demarcated as the Dierama Wildflower Reserve. In 1986, the reserve was expanded to 77.95 ha and designated as the Potters Pass Nature Reserve. The Potters Pass and Molteno Drive roads that confine the western and southern parts of the reserve was once part of the South African Grand Prix's Prince George Circuit from 1934 to 1969 until the Grand Prix moved to Kyalami.

== Biodiversity ==
The reserve is one of a few remaining grassland biomes in East London. The mainly moist coastal grassveld and six different soil types support a wide range of flora and fauna. Butterflies like the African monarch butterfly, and moths like the pine emperor can be found in the reserve.

=== Vegetation ===
Streams in the reserve have surrounding them subtropical copses of trees, with acacia savanna trees like the Vachellia karroo between the grassveld and streams. A section of the reserve at the intertidal zone contains marshland vegetation.

Flowering plants include:

- Barebell (This is where the reserve got its initial name from)
- Brachystelma tuberosum (Endemic to the region)
- Helichrysum
- Hibiscus trionum
- Indigofera
- Kniphofia rooperi
- Oxalis
- Red-hot poker
- Rooigras
- Strelitzia reginae
- Watsonia galpinii
- Watsonia pillansii

Shrubs include:

- Cross berry
- Wild pomegranate

Plants in the salt marshes include:

- Sea-lavender
- Chenolea diffusa

== Geology ==
Large rocks on the eastern part of the reserve are from the Ecca and Beaufort groups. There are 6 soil types at the reserve.

== Threats ==
It faces threats of disturbance from a nearby sewage sea outlet, urban expansion and trampling on vegetation.

== See also ==
- List of protected areas of South Africa
