= Dierama pumilum =

Scientific classification
- Kingdom: Plantae
- Clade: Tracheophytes
- Clade: Angiosperms
- Clade: Monocots
- Order: Asparagales
- Family: Iridaceae
- Genus: Dierama
- Species: D. pumilum

Binomial name
- Dierama pumilum N.E.Br.

Species of flowering plant

Dierama pumilum is a perennial geophyte that is part of the Iridaceae family. The species is endemic to South Africa and occurs in KwaZulu-Natal. The species has a range of less than 7500 km^{2} and occurs from Nkandla to Noodsberg. The species has lost its habitat to plantations, sugarcane fields, crop cultivation and is further threatened by overgrazing.
