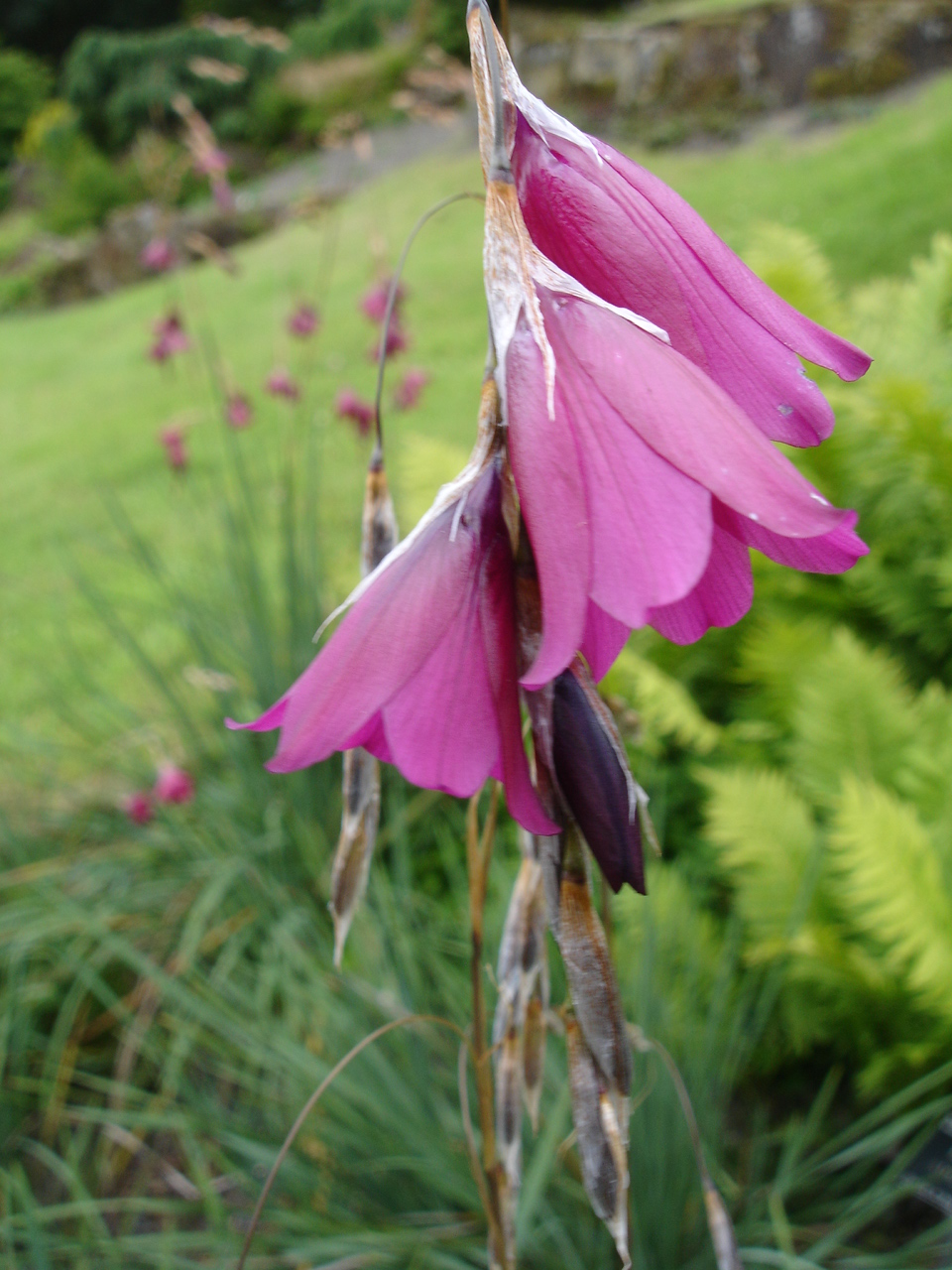

Scientific classification
- Kingdom: Plantae
- Clade: Tracheophytes
- Clade: Angiosperms
- Clade: Monocots
- Order: Asparagales
- Family: Iridaceae
- Genus: Dierama
- Species: D. dracomontanum

Binomial name
- Dierama dracomontanum Hilliard

= Dierama dracomontanum =

Species of flowering plant

Dierama dracomontanum, the Drakensberg hairbell, is a perennial geophyte that is part of the Iridaceae family. The species is native to Lesotho and South Africa and occurs in KwaZulu-Natal, Eastern Cape and the Free State.
