= Dierama elatum =

Conservation status
- Data Deficient (IUCN 3.1)

Scientific classification
- Kingdom: Plantae
- Clade: Tracheophytes
- Clade: Angiosperms
- Clade: Monocots
- Order: Asparagales
- Family: Iridaceae
- Genus: Dierama
- Species: D. elatum

Binomial name
- Dierama elatum N.E.Br.

Species of flowering plant

Dierama elatum is a perennial geophyte that is part of the Iridaceae family. The species is endemic to Eswatini.
