= Dierama grandiflorum =

Scientific classification
- Kingdom: Plantae
- Clade: Tracheophytes
- Clade: Angiosperms
- Clade: Monocots
- Order: Asparagales
- Family: Iridaceae
- Genus: Dierama
- Species: D. grandiflorum

Binomial name
- Dierama grandiflorum G.J.Lewis

Species of flowering plant

Dierama grandiflorum is a perennial geophyte that is part of the Iridaceae family. The species is endemic to South Africa and occurs in the Eastern Cape. The plant has a range of 3 444 km^{2} and occurs from Graaff-Reinet to Somerset East. The species is threatened by the declining quality of its habitat.
