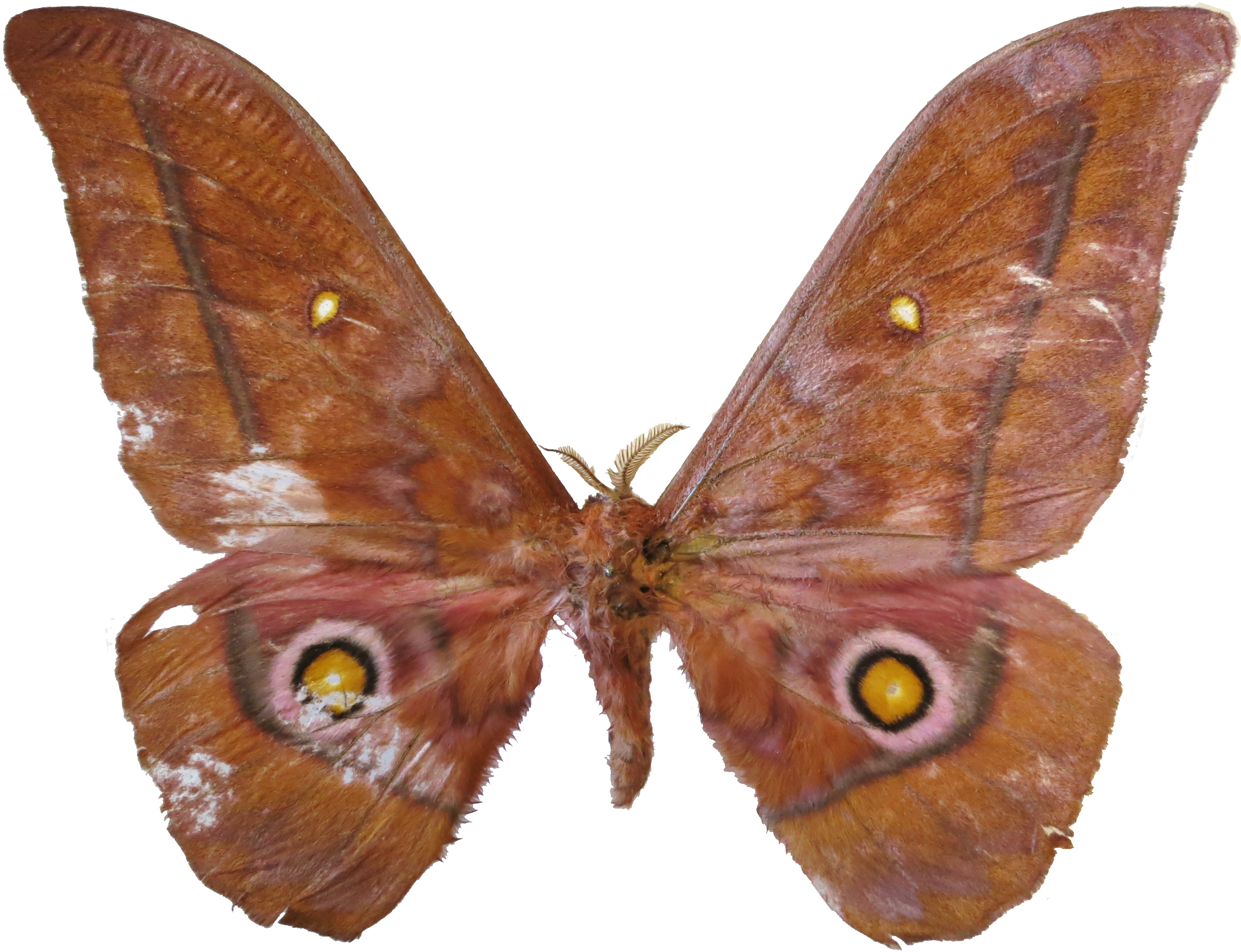

Scientific classification
- Kingdom: Animalia
- Phylum: Arthropoda
- Class: Insecta
- Order: Lepidoptera
- Family: Saturniidae
- Genus: Nudaurelia
- Species: N. xanthomma

Binomial name
- Nudaurelia xanthomma (Rothschild, 1907)

Synonyms
- Imbrasia anthina xanthomma Rothschild, 1907; Nudaurelia amathusia Weymer, 1909

= Nudaurelia xanthomma =

Species of moth

Nudaurelia xanthomma is a moth of the family Saturniidae. It is known from Cameroon, Ghana and Sierra Leone.

The body of the male of this species has a length of 34 millimetres (1.3 in), its forewings a length of 65 mm (2.6 in) and a width of 29 mm (1.1 in), with a wingspan of 117 mm (4.6 in).

The ground colour of the forewings is brownish red-yellow, the underside is yellow-brown.

== Subspecies ==
- Nudaurelia xanthomma xanthomma (Rothschild, 1907) (Sierra Leone/Ghana)
- Nudaurelia xanthomma amathusia Weymer, 1909 (from Cameroon)
