= Dierama formosum =

Scientific classification
- Kingdom: Plantae
- Clade: Tracheophytes
- Clade: Angiosperms
- Clade: Monocots
- Order: Asparagales
- Family: Iridaceae
- Genus: Dierama
- Species: D. formosum

Binomial name
- Dierama formosum Hilliard

Species of flowering plant

Dierama formosum is a perennial geophyte that is part of the Iridaceae family. The species is native to Malawi, Mozambique, South Africa and Zimbabwe. In South Africa, the plant has a range of 2 225 km^{2} and is found on the Mpumalanga Highveld near Dullstroom and Lydenburg. In Zimbabwe, the plant occurs on the eastern highlands as well as in the Mulanje Massif in Malawi.
