= Dierama robustum =

Scientific classification
- Kingdom: Plantae
- Clade: Tracheophytes
- Clade: Angiosperms
- Clade: Monocots
- Order: Asparagales
- Family: Iridaceae
- Genus: Dierama
- Species: D. robustum

Binomial name
- Dierama robustum N.E.Br.

Species of flowering plant

Dierama robustum is a perennial geophyte that is part of the Iridaceae family. The species is native to Lesotho and South Africa and occurs in KwaZulu-Natal, Eastern Cape and the Free State.
