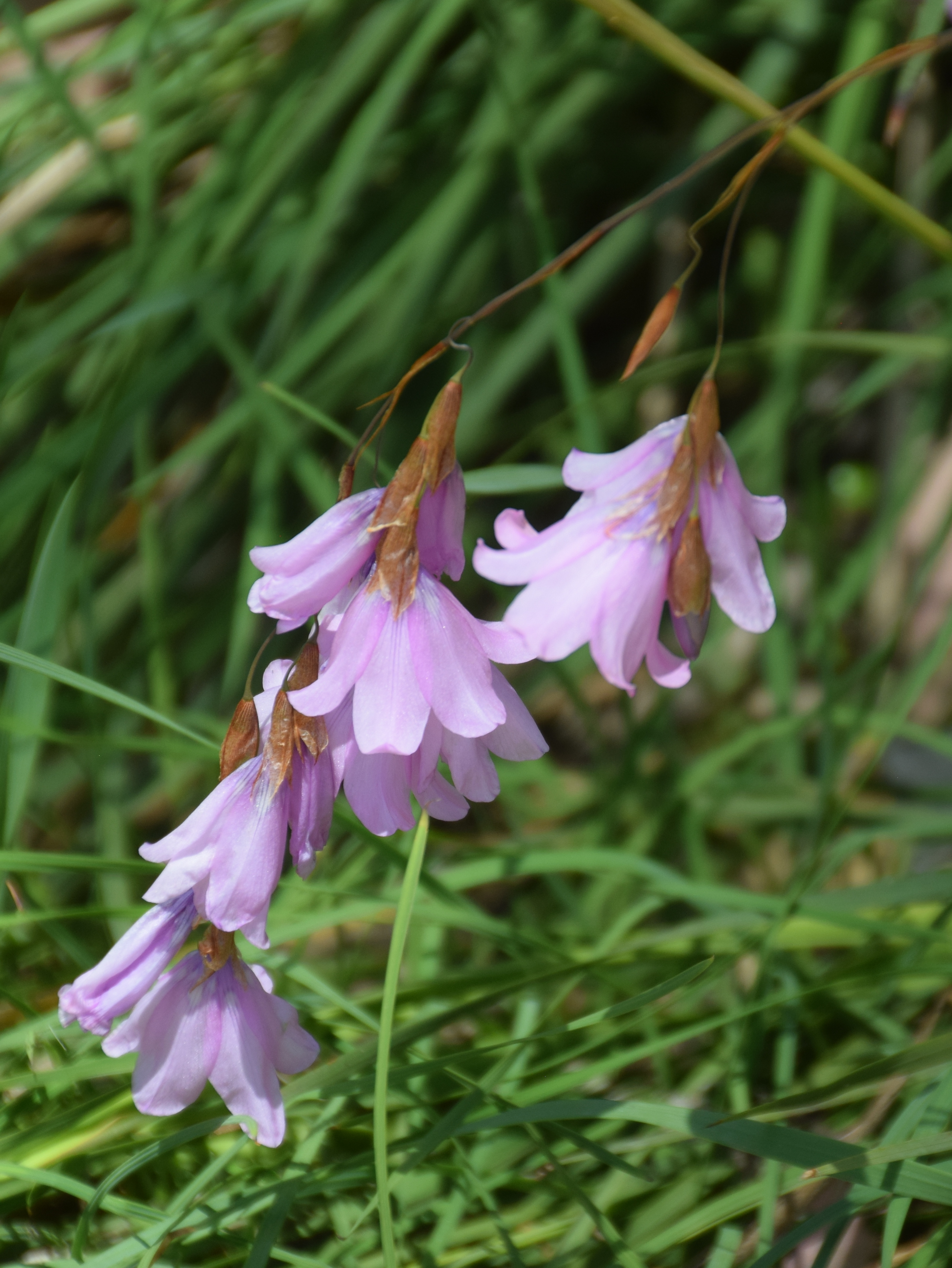

Scientific classification
- Kingdom: Plantae
- Clade: Tracheophytes
- Clade: Angiosperms
- Clade: Monocots
- Order: Asparagales
- Family: Iridaceae
- Genus: Dierama
- Species: D. pauciflorum

Binomial name
- Dierama pauciflorum N.E.Br.

= Dierama pauciflorum =

Species of flowering plant

Dierama pauciflorum, the few-flowered wandflower, is a species of flowering plant in the iris family Iridaceae, native to south and east Africa. This bulbous perennial forms short, evergreen, grass-like clumps to 30–40 cm (12–16 in) high. The sparse trumpet-shaped flowers are borne on arching stems which are only slightly longer than the foliage. They are rich pink, and fuller in shape than its close relative Dierama igneum.

The common name angel's fishing-rod refers to all species of Dierama.

It is cultivated as an ornamental plant in temperate climates. Rated as hardy down to −10 °C (14 °F) (RHS hardiness rating H4), it requires a sheltered, south- or west-facing spot in full sun.
