= Dierama trichorhizum =

Scientific classification
- Kingdom: Plantae
- Clade: Tracheophytes
- Clade: Angiosperms
- Clade: Monocots
- Order: Asparagales
- Family: Iridaceae
- Genus: Dierama
- Species: D. trichorhizum

Binomial name
- Dierama trichorhizum (Baker) N.E.Br.

Synonyms
- Ixia trichorhiza (Baker) Baker; Morphixia trichorhiza Baker

Species of flowering plant

Dierama trichorhizum is a perennial geophyte that is part of the Iridaceae family. The species is native to Lesotho and South Africa and occurs in KwaZulu-Natal, Mpumalanga and the Eastern Cape.
