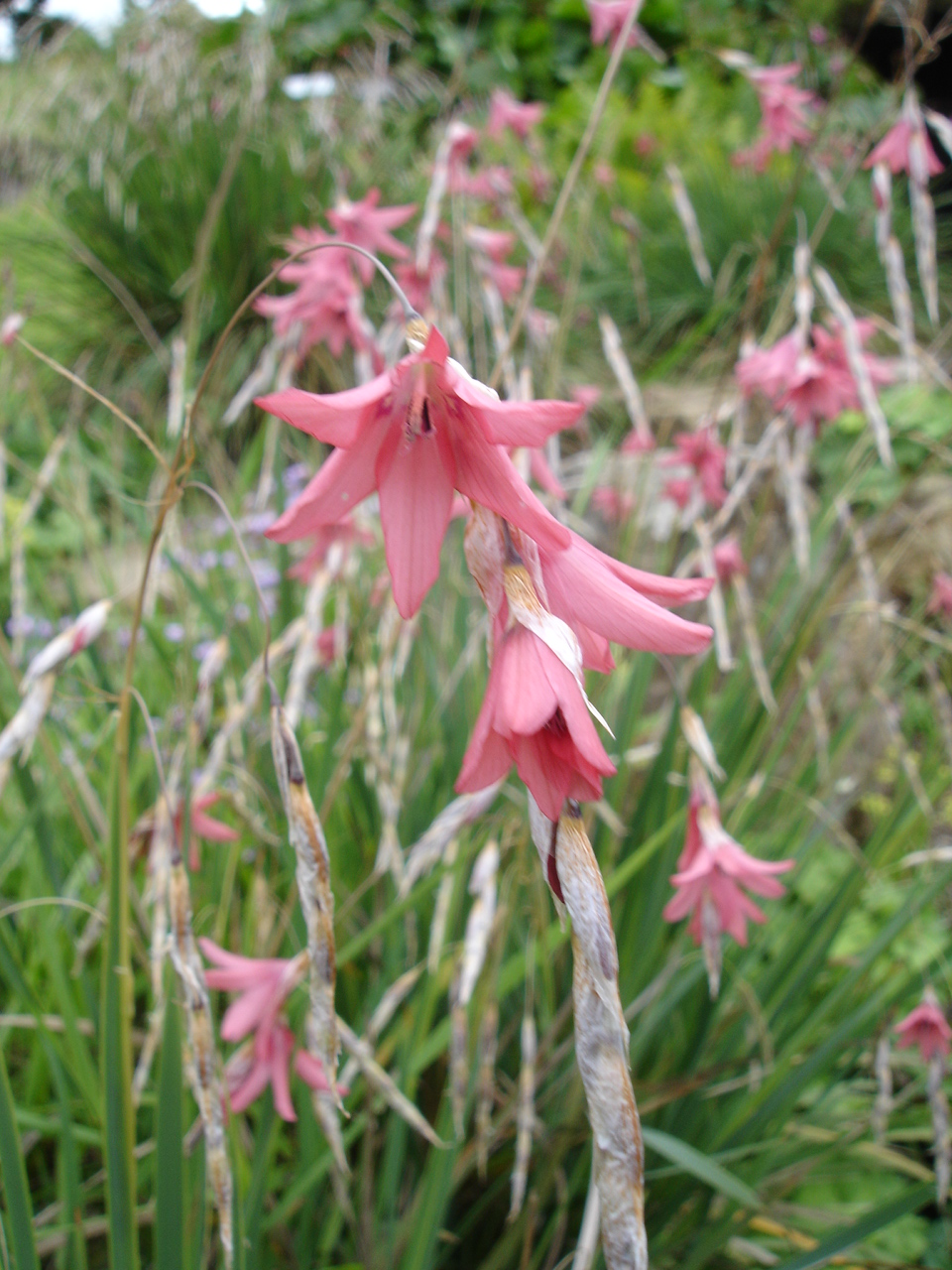
- Dierama igneum

Scientific classification
- Kingdom: Plantae
- Clade: Tracheophytes
- Clade: Angiosperms
- Clade: Monocots
- Order: Asparagales
- Family: Iridaceae
- Subfamily: Crocoideae
- Tribe: Croceae
- Genus: Dierama; K.Koch

Type species
- Dierama ensifolium Koch & Bouché

Species
- See text

= Dierama =

Genus of flowering plants

Dierama is a genus of flowering plants in the family Iridaceae. Common names include hairbells, angel's fishing rod, fairybells, and wandflowers in English and grasklokkies (= grass-bells) in Afrikaans. They are native to Africa, with most occurring in the southern regions of the continent. The center of diversity is the province of KwaZulu-Natal in eastern South Africa.

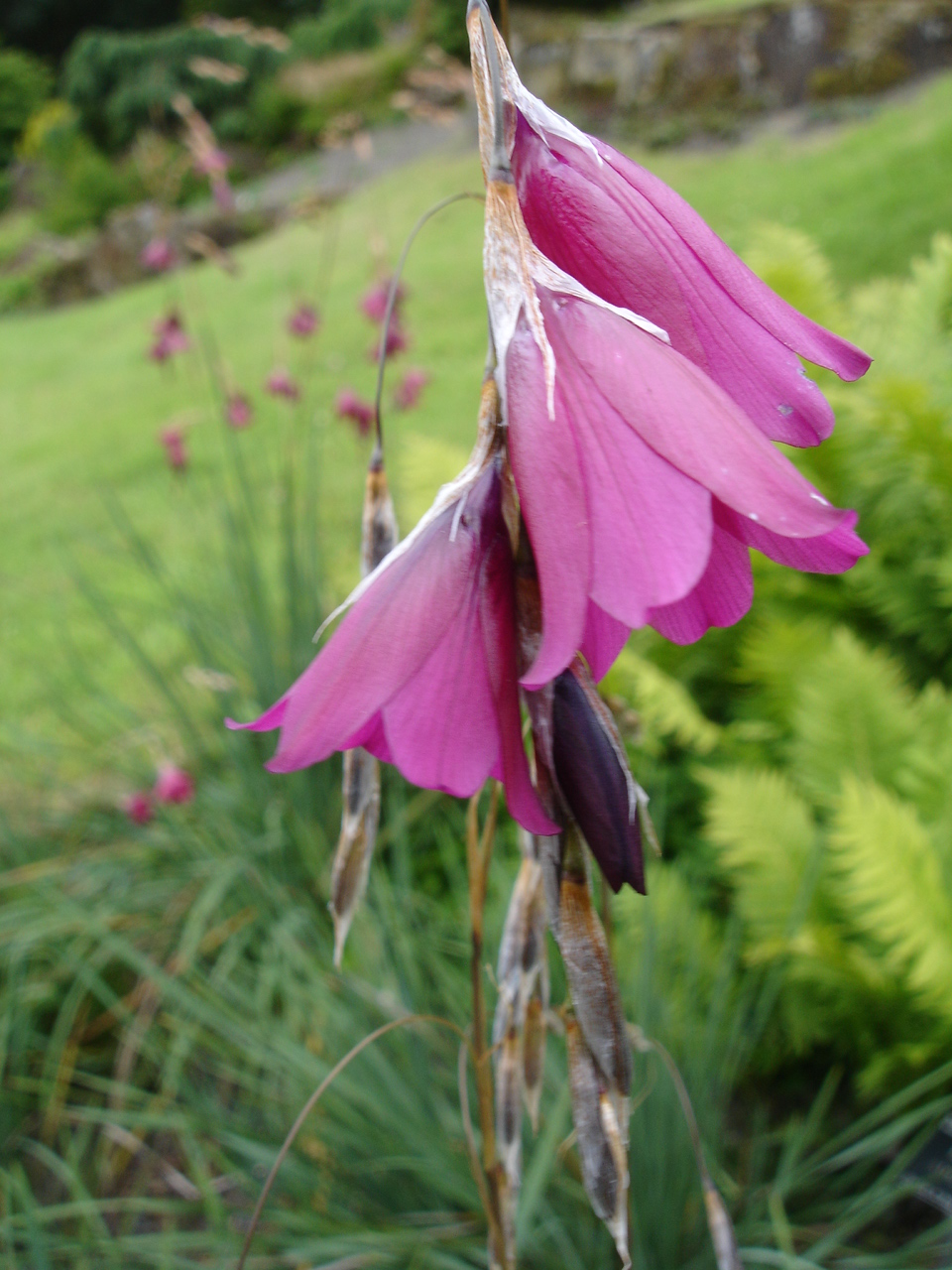
Dierama dracomontanum

== Description ==
Plants of this genus are evergreen perennial herbs growing from large corms with fibrous tunics. The lowest two or three leaves are cataphylls that sheath the lower stem and become dry. The thin, wiry, branching stem may bend and droop when in flower. It is lined with leaves that have linear blades with thick longitudinal veins and often no midrib. The inflorescence is a panicle of several spikes of flowers. The spikes may hang like bells or grow erect. The bracts around the flowers are usually dry, thin, membranous, translucent, and streaked or veined with brown. The bell-shaped flowers of most wild species are pink; red, purple, yellow, and white taxa also exist. There are many cultivars in a range of colors, sometimes with spots of yellow or blue. The fruit is a spherical capsule.

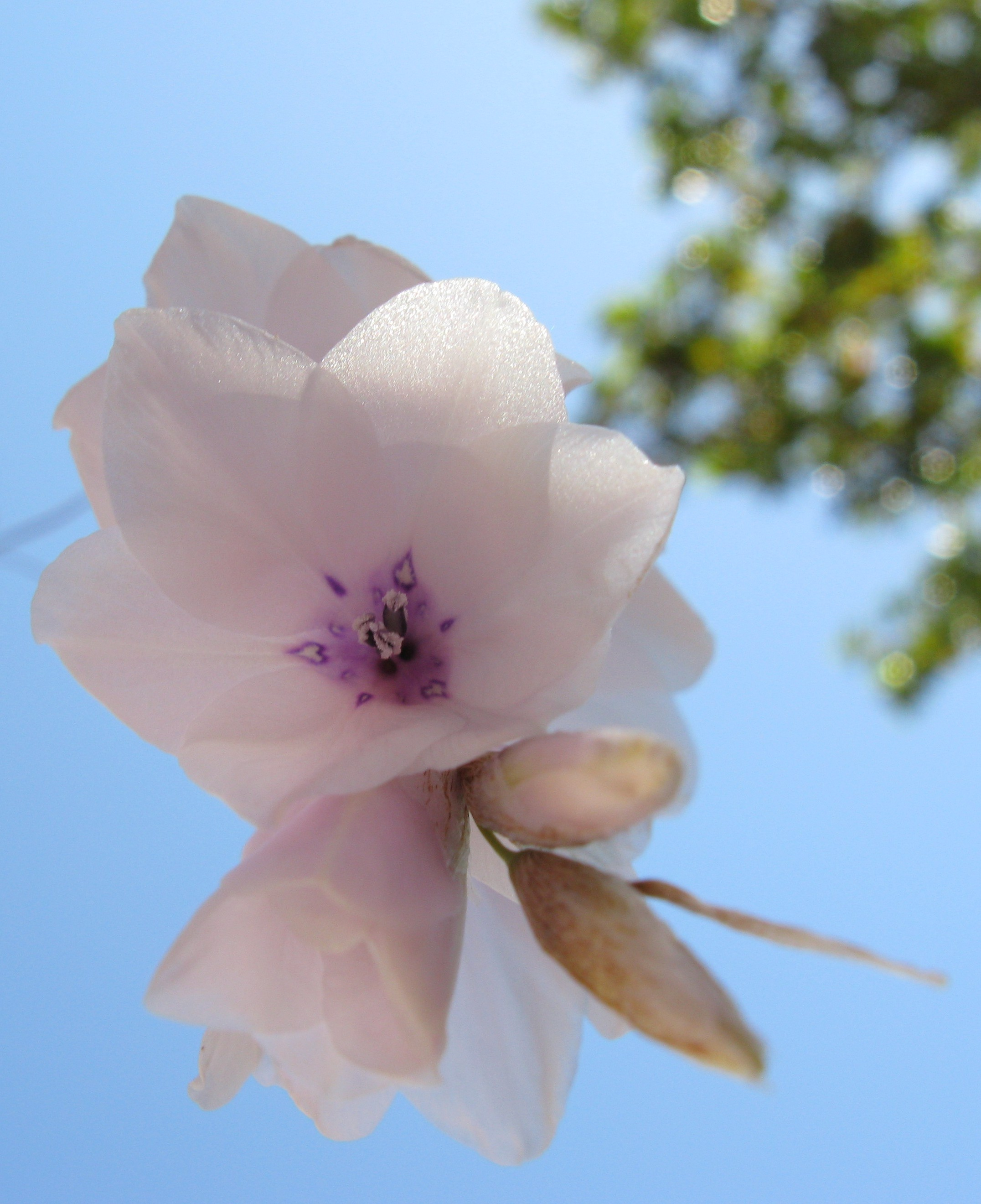
Dierama pendulum

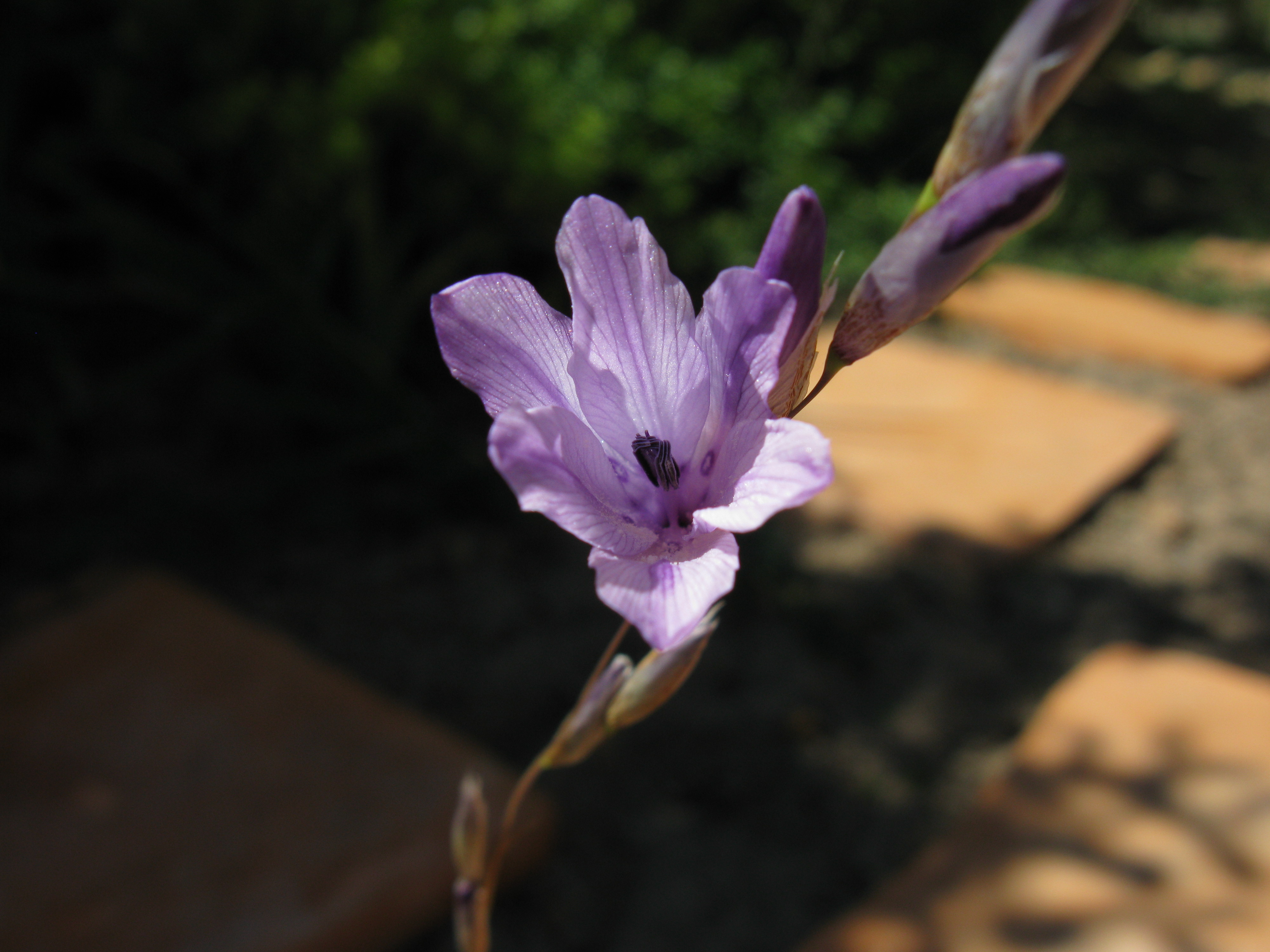
Dierama nixonianum

== Etymology ==
The genus name is derived from the Greek word dierama, meaning "funnel," and alludes to the flower shape.

== Diversity ==
There are about 44 species.

Species include:

- Dierama adelphicum
- Dierama ambiguum
- Dierama argyreum
- Dierama atrum
- Dierama cooperi
- Dierama cupuliflorum
- Dierama densiflorum
- Dierama dissimile
- Dierama dracomontanum
- Dierama dubium
- Dierama elatum
- Dierama erectum
- Dierama floriferum
- Dierama formosum
- Dierama galpinii
- Dierama gracile
- Dierama grandiflorum
- Dierama igneum
- Dierama insigne
- Dierama inyangense
- Dierama jucundum
- Dierama latifolium
- Dierama longistylum
- Dierama luteoalbidum
- Dierama medium
- Dierama mobile
- Dierama mossii
- Dierama nebrownii
- Dierama nixonianum
- Dierama pallidum
- Dierama palustre
- Dierama parviflorum
- Dierama pauciflorum
- Dierama pendulum - angel's fishing rods, grassy bells, fairybell, hairbell, wedding bell
- Dierama pictum
- Dierama plowesii
- Dierama pulcherrimum
- Dierama pumilum
- Dierama reynoldsii
- Dierama robustum
- Dierama sertum
- Dierama trichorhizum
- Dierama tyrium
- Dierama tysonii

== Uses ==
Some species of dierama are cultivated as ornamental plants, such as the purple-pink-flowered D. pendulum. The South African endemic D. erectum is grown for the large, pink flowers it bears on tall, erect stems. It is prone to attack by the bean weevil Urodon lilii.

Certain species have been used in traditional African medicine and spiritual practices. D. erectum is used as an enema by the Sotho people and as a treatment for stomach problems. The corm of the plant is a fertility charm for bringing a good harvest.

== Conservation ==
Some species, especially the narrow endemics, are decreasing in abundance due to loss of habitat. The South African natives D. ambiguum, D. erectum, and D. nixonianum are considered endangered species.
