= Nudaurelia richelmanni =

Scientific classification
- Kingdom: Animalia
- Phylum: Arthropoda
- Class: Insecta
- Order: Lepidoptera
- Family: Saturniidae
- Genus: Nudaurelia
- Species: N. richelmanni

Binomial name
- Nudaurelia richelmanni Weymer, 1909

Species of moth

Nudaurelia richelmanni is a moth of the family Saturniidae. It is known from Tanzania.

The body of the male of this species has a length of 32mm, its forewings a length of 60mm (with a width of 30mm) and it has a wingspan of 109 millimetres (4.3 in). The ground colour of the forewings is red-yellow, similar to Nudaurelia gueinzii (Staudinger, 1872), finely brownish-violet dusted, particularly at the costa.
