= Dierama inyangense =

Conservation status
- Endangered (IUCN 3.1)

Scientific classification
- Kingdom: Plantae
- Clade: Tracheophytes
- Clade: Angiosperms
- Clade: Monocots
- Order: Asparagales
- Family: Iridaceae
- Genus: Dierama
- Species: D. inyangense

Binomial name
- Dierama inyangense Hilliard

Species of flowering plant

Dierama inyangense is a perennial geophyte that is part of the Iridaceae family. The species is native to Mozambique and Zimbabwe.
