= Dierama jucundum =

Scientific classification
- Kingdom: Plantae
- Clade: Tracheophytes
- Clade: Angiosperms
- Clade: Monocots
- Order: Asparagales
- Family: Iridaceae
- Genus: Dierama
- Species: D. jucundum

Binomial name
- Dierama jucundum Hilliard

Species of flowering plant

Dierama jucundum is a perennial geophyte that is part of the Iridaceae family. The species is native to Lesotho and South Africa where it occurs in the Eastern Cape.
