= Dierama tyrium =

Scientific classification
- Kingdom: Plantae
- Clade: Tracheophytes
- Clade: Angiosperms
- Clade: Monocots
- Order: Asparagales
- Family: Iridaceae
- Genus: Dierama
- Species: D. tyrium

Binomial name
- Dierama tyrium Hilliard

Species of flowering plant

Dierama tyrium is a perennial geophyte that is part of the Iridaceae family. The species is endemic to South Africa and occurs in KwaZulu-Natal and Mpumalanga.
