= Dierama sertum =

Scientific classification
- Kingdom: Plantae
- Clade: Tracheophytes
- Clade: Angiosperms
- Clade: Monocots
- Order: Asparagales
- Family: Iridaceae
- Genus: Dierama
- Species: D. sertum

Binomial name
- Dierama sertum Hilliard

Species of flowering plant

Dierama sertum is a perennial geophyte that is part of the Iridaceae family. The species is endemic to South Africa and occurs in KwaZulu-Natal. The species has a range of 1900 km^{2} and occurs from the Tugela River mouth to St Lucia. The species is threatened by development and the establishment of plantations and sugar cane fields.
