= Dierama longistylum =

Scientific classification
- Kingdom: Plantae
- Clade: Tracheophytes
- Clade: Angiosperms
- Clade: Monocots
- Order: Asparagales
- Family: Iridaceae
- Genus: Dierama
- Species: D. longistylum

Binomial name
- Dierama longistylum Marais

Species of flowering plant

Dierama longistylum is a species of flowering plant in the family Iridaceae. It is a perennial geophyte that is native to Malawi, Tanzania and Zambia. The is
