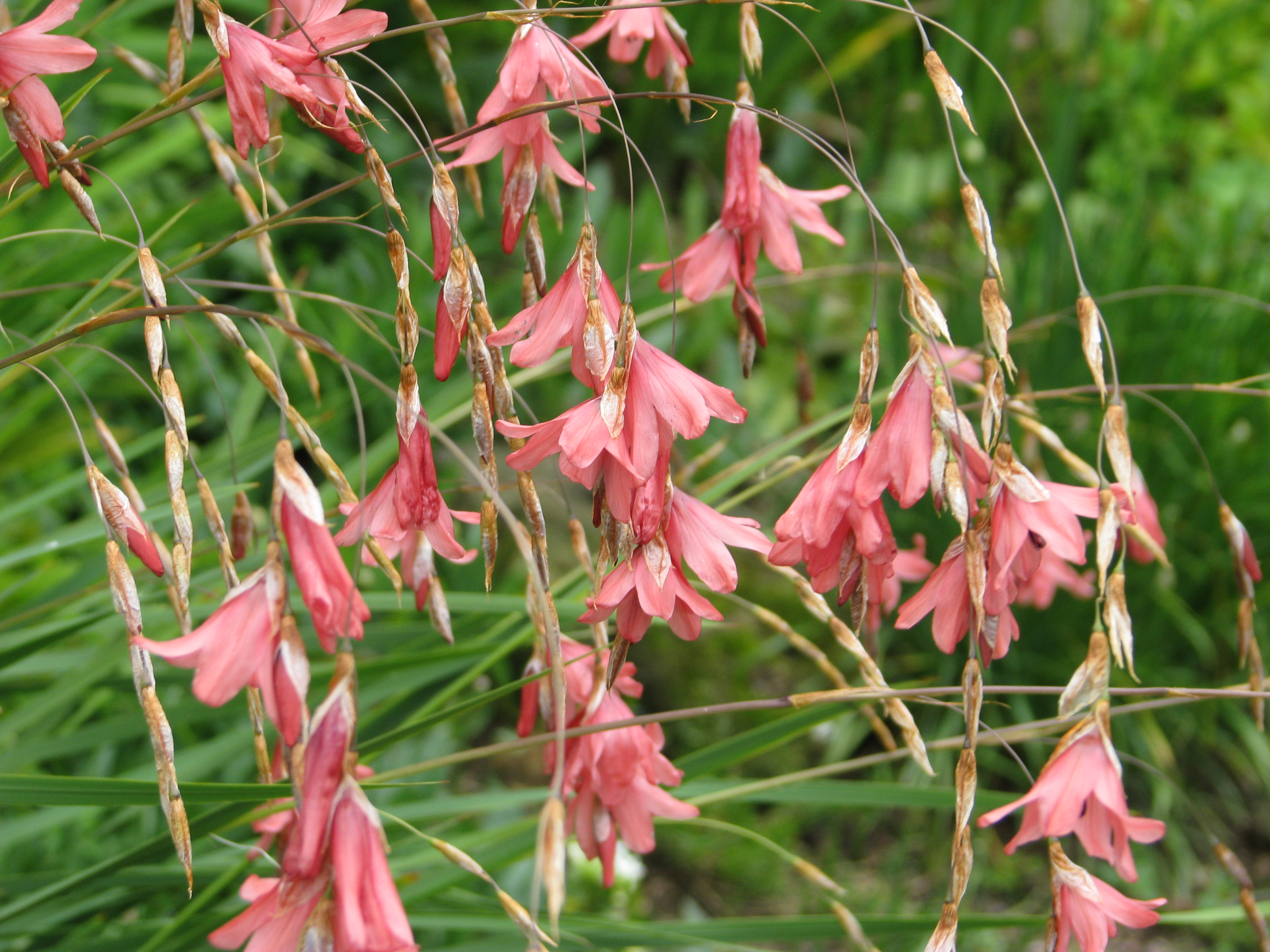

Scientific classification
- Kingdom: Plantae
- Clade: Tracheophytes
- Clade: Angiosperms
- Clade: Monocots
- Order: Asparagales
- Family: Iridaceae
- Genus: Dierama
- Species: D. igneum

Binomial name
- Dierama igneum Klatt

Synonyms
- Dierama pansum N.E.Br.

= Dierama igneum =

Species of flowering plant

Dierama igneum, the fiery wandflower, is a species of flowering plant in the iris family Iridaceae, native to the southeastern Cape Provinces and southern KwaZulu-Natal in South Africa. It is a slow-growing, bulbous perennial growing to 1 m (3.3 ft) tall from clumps of grass-like leaves. Evergreen in its native Africa, it may become herbaceous in colder regions. The trumpet shaped flowers are borne on long, arching stems, and are normally salmon pink in colour. The specific epithet igneum, meaning "glowing" or "fiery", may refer to these arching sprays of blooms.

The common name angel's fishing-rod attaches to all species of Dierama.

It is cultivated as an ornamental plant in temperate climates. Rated as hardy down to −10 °C (14 °F) (RHS hardiness rating H4), it requires a sheltered, south-facing spot in full sun, and dislikes winter wet.

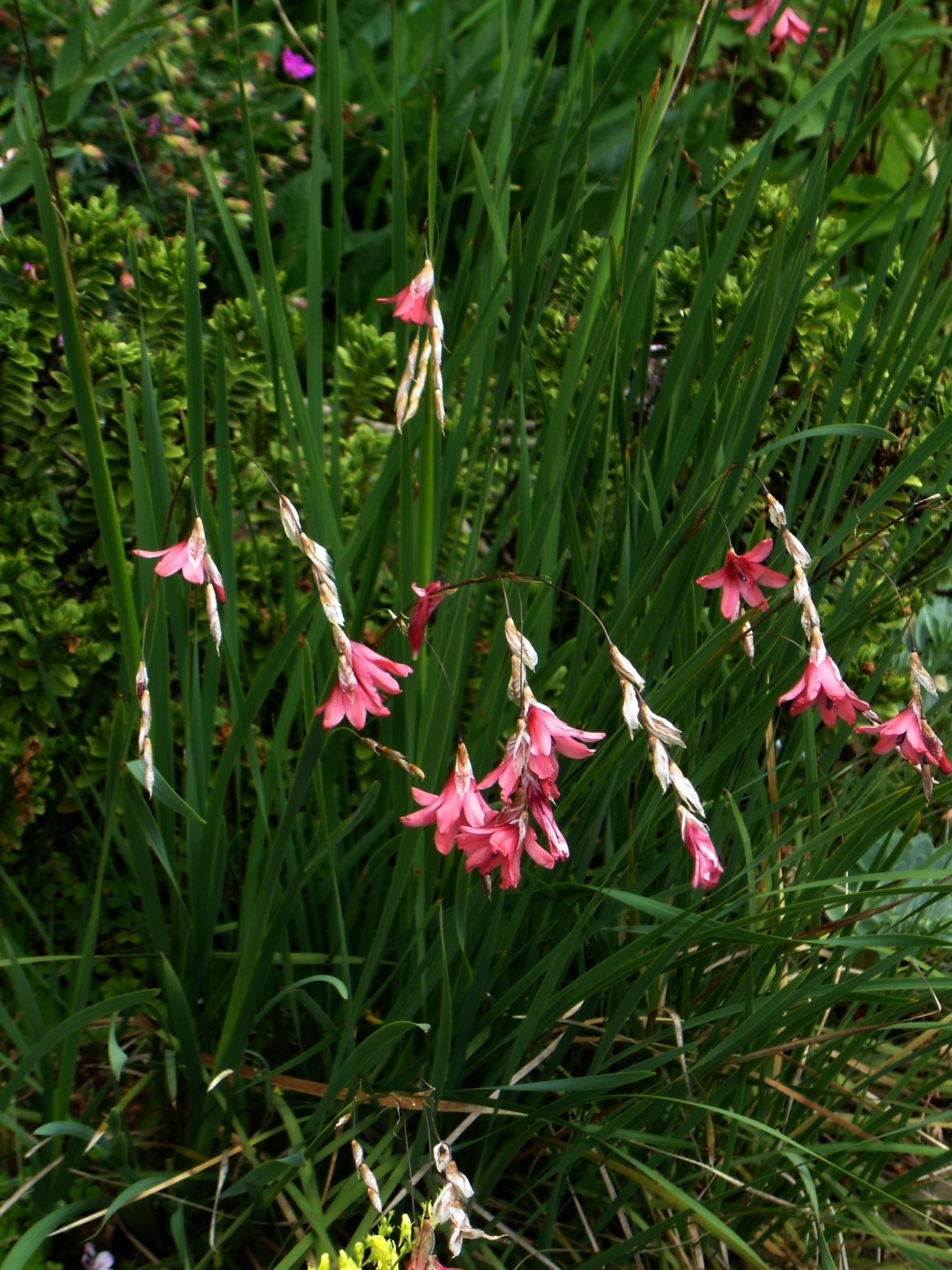

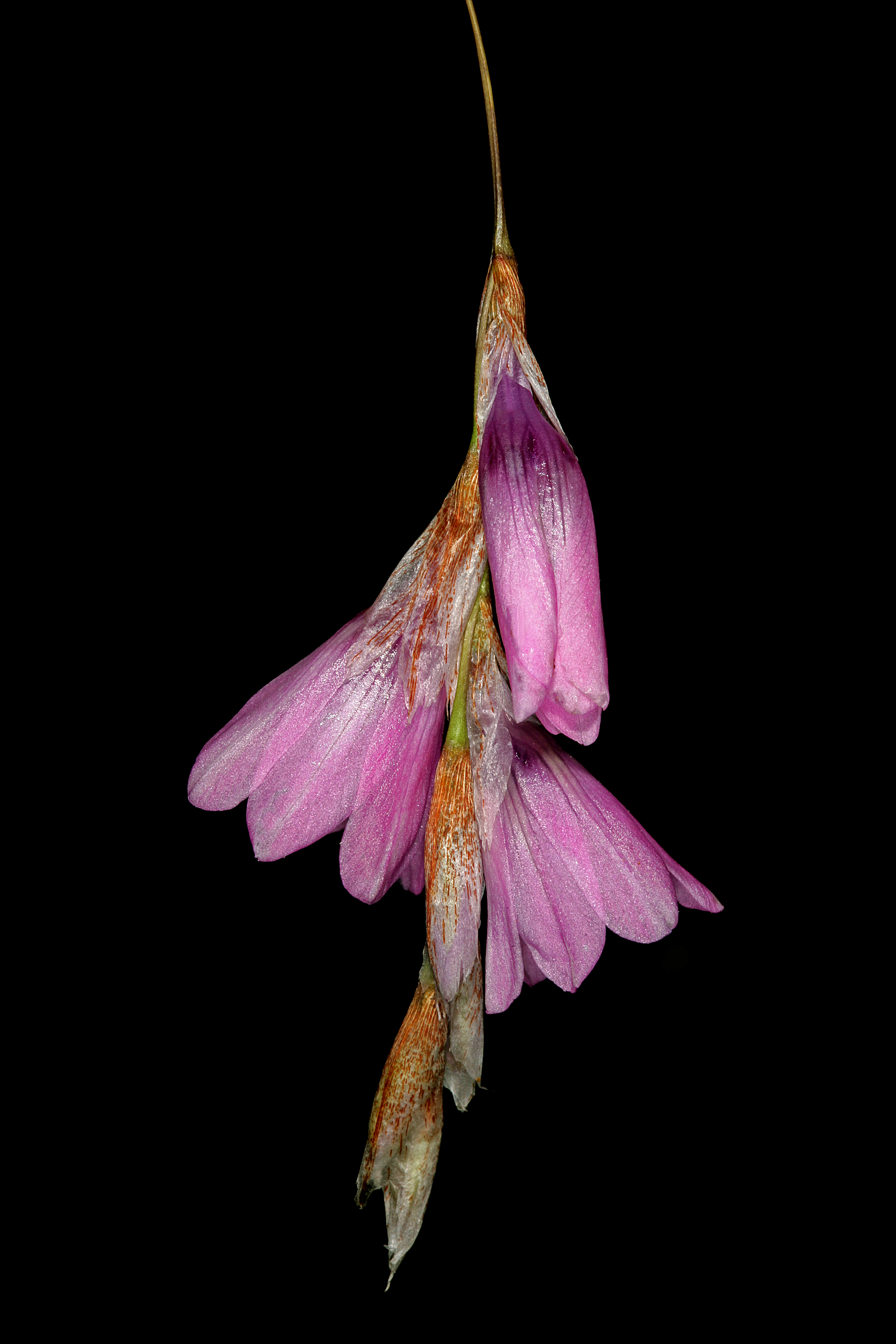

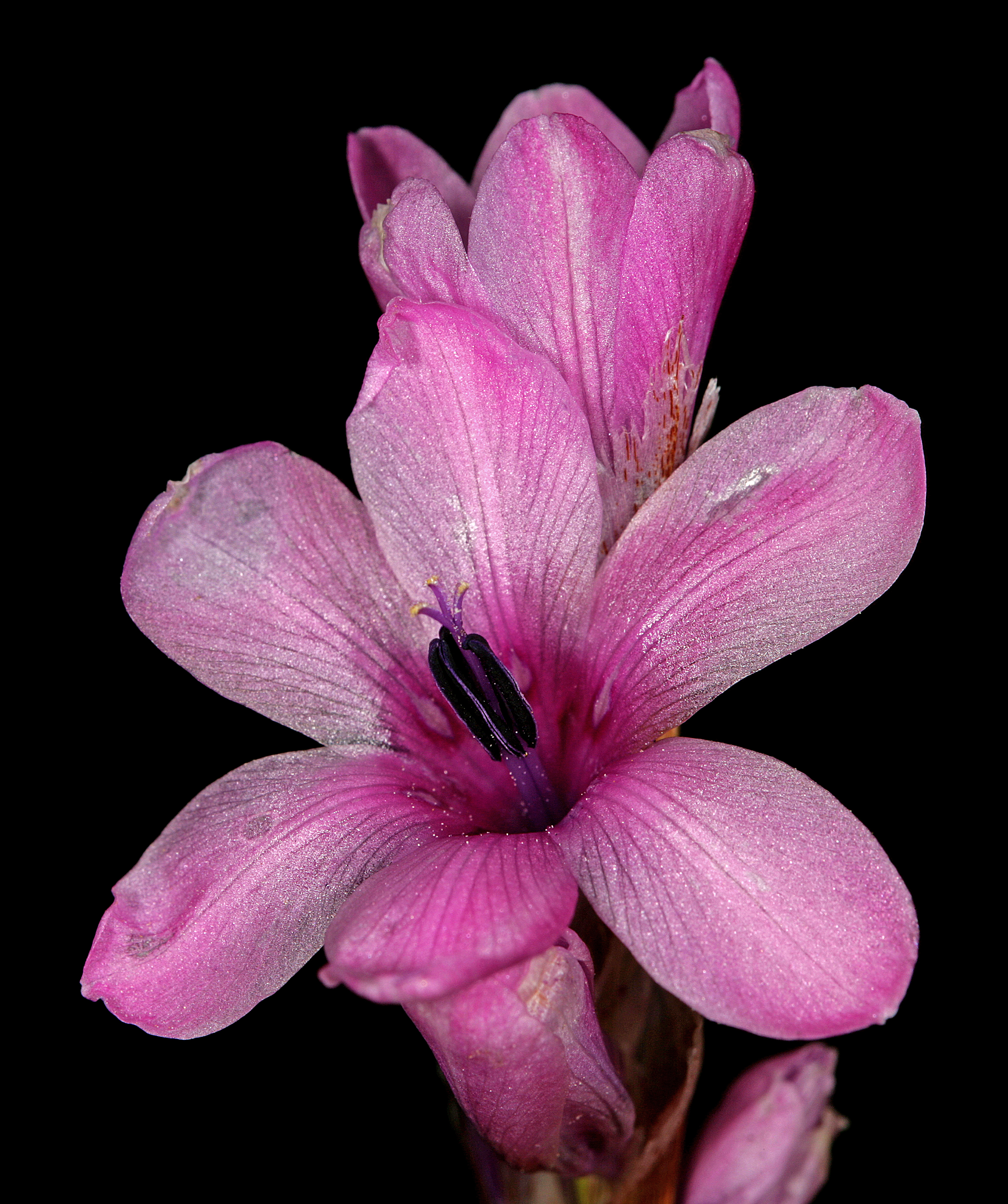
