= Dierama mossii =

Scientific classification
- Kingdom: Plantae
- Clade: Tracheophytes
- Clade: Angiosperms
- Clade: Monocots
- Order: Asparagales
- Family: Iridaceae
- Genus: Dierama
- Species: D. mossii

Binomial name
- Dierama mossii (N.E.Br.) Hilliard

Synonyms
- Dierama medium var. mossii N.E.Br.

Species of flowering plant

Dierama mossii is a perennial geophyte that is part of the Iridaceae family. The species is native to Eswatini and South Africa. In South Africa, the plant occurs in the Gauteng, KwaZulu-Natal and Mpumalanga provinces.
