= Dierama adelphicum =

Scientific classification
- Kingdom: Plantae
- Clade: Tracheophytes
- Clade: Angiosperms
- Clade: Monocots
- Order: Asparagales
- Family: Iridaceae
- Genus: Dierama
- Species: D. adelphicum

Binomial name
- Dierama adelphicum Hilliard

Species of flowering plant

Dierama adelphicum is a perennial geophyte that is part of the Iridaceae family. The species is native to Eswatini and South Africa. In South Africa, the plant occurs in the Limpopo and Mpumalanga provinces.
