= Dierama dubium =

Scientific classification
- Kingdom: Plantae
- Clade: Tracheophytes
- Clade: Angiosperms
- Clade: Monocots
- Order: Asparagales
- Family: Iridaceae
- Genus: Dierama
- Species: D. dubium

Binomial name
- Dierama dubium N.E.Br.

Species of flowering plant

Dierama dubium is a perennial geophyte that is part of the Iridaceae family. The species is endemic to South Africa and occurs in KwaZulu-Natal, from Mahlabatini to Mapumulo. The plant has a range of 3800 km^{2} and there are up to seven subpopulations. The species is particularly threatened in the south where its habitat has been distorted as well as by crop cultivation and overgrazing.
