= Dierama floriferum =

Scientific classification
- Kingdom: Plantae
- Clade: Tracheophytes
- Clade: Angiosperms
- Clade: Monocots
- Order: Asparagales
- Family: Iridaceae
- Genus: Dierama
- Species: D. floriferum

Binomial name
- Dierama floriferum Hilliard

Species of flowering plant

Dierama floriferum is a perennial geophyte that is part of the Iridaceae family. The species is endemic to South Africa and occurs in KwaZulu-Natal, Mpumalanga and the Eastern Cape.
