= Dierama plowesii =

Conservation status
- Vulnerable (IUCN 3.1)

Scientific classification
- Kingdom: Plantae
- Clade: Tracheophytes
- Clade: Angiosperms
- Clade: Monocots
- Order: Asparagales
- Family: Iridaceae
- Genus: Dierama
- Species: D. plowesii

Binomial name
- Dierama plowesii Hilliard

Species of flowering plant

Dierama plowesii is a perennial geophyte belonging to the Iridaceae family. The species is native to Mozambique and Zimbabwe and occurs in the Chimanimani Mountains.
