= Dierama erectum =

Scientific classification
- Kingdom: Plantae
- Clade: Tracheophytes
- Clade: Angiosperms
- Clade: Monocots
- Order: Asparagales
- Family: Iridaceae
- Genus: Dierama
- Species: D. erectum

Binomial name
- Dierama erectum Hilliard

Species of flowering plant

Dierama erectum is a perennial geophyte that is part of the Iridaceae family. The species is endemic to South Africa. The species has a range of 4 325 km^{2} and occurs in northern KwaZulu-Natal between Ngome and Lüneberg. The species is threatened by overgrazing and uncontrolled veld fires.
