= Dierama densiflorum =

Scientific classification
- Kingdom: Plantae
- Clade: Tracheophytes
- Clade: Angiosperms
- Clade: Monocots
- Order: Asparagales
- Family: Iridaceae
- Genus: Dierama
- Species: D. densiflorum

Binomial name
- Dierama densiflorum Marais

Species of flowering plant

Dierama densiflorum is a species of flowering plant in the family Iridaceae. It is a perennial geophyte that is native to Malawi and Tanzania.
