= Hood Point Lighthouse =

Historic lighthouse in East London, South Africa

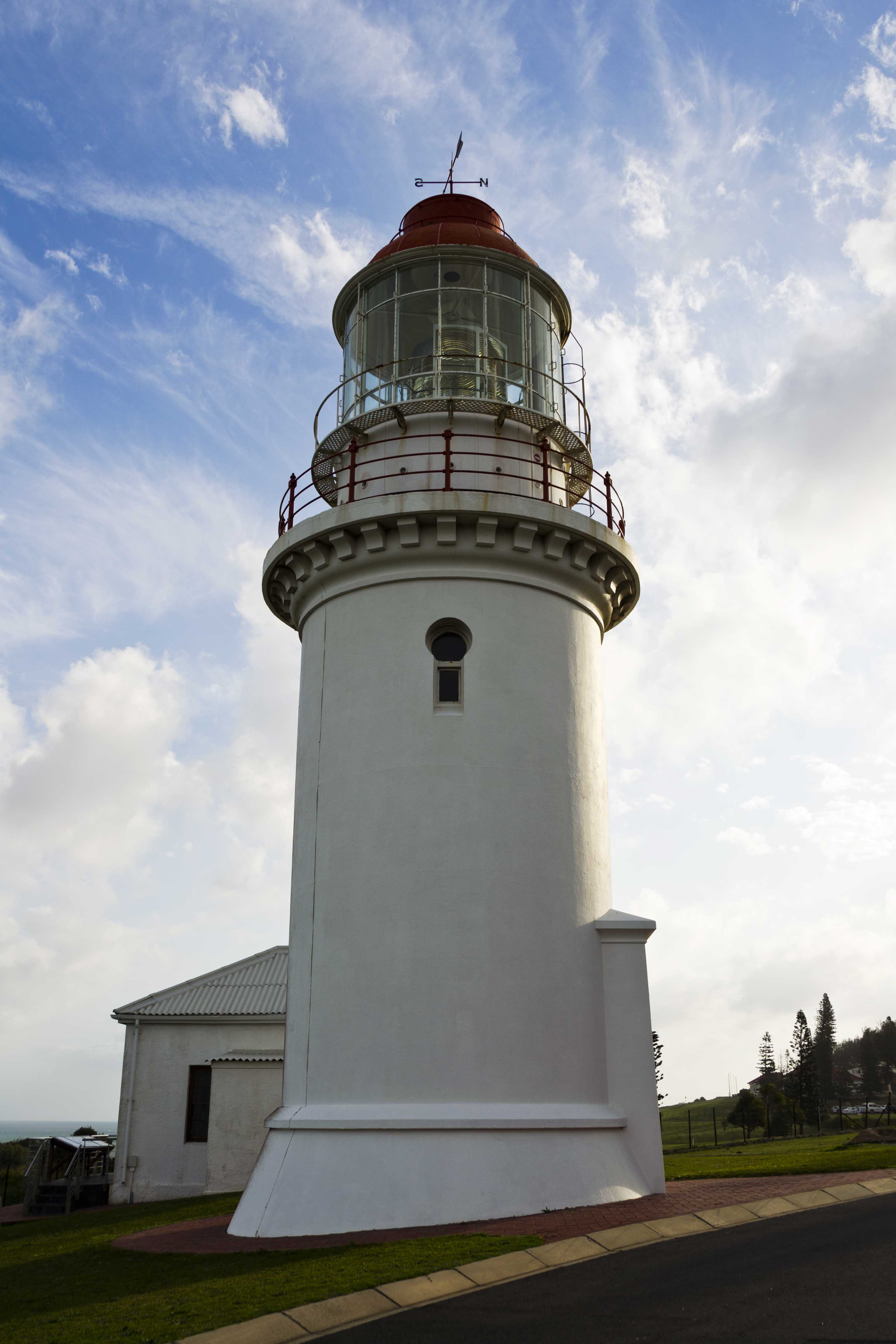
- Location: Buffalo City Metropolitan Municipality, South Africa
- Coordinates: 33°02′26″S 27°53′55″E

Tower
- Height: 19 m (62 ft)

Light
- First lit: 4 June 1895
- Focal height: 55 m (180 ft)
- Range: 28 nmi (52 km; 32 mi)
- Characteristic: Fl(4) W 40s

The Hood Point Lighthouse (Afrikaans: Hood Point-vuurtoring) is a lighthouse in East London, South Africa. It began operating on 4 June 1895. It is 19 m high and centres on a white, round stone tower. The lantern dome is painted red. Before the building of the lighthouse, the Castle Point Lighthouse served the area. It lies beside the Potters Pass Nature Reserve and the West Bank Golf Course.

== Cultural heritage ==
The Hood Point Lighthouse was declared a provincial heritage site on 22 May 1998, under the National Heritage Resources Act (25/1999).
