= Dierama atrum =

Scientific classification
- Kingdom: Plantae
- Clade: Tracheophytes
- Clade: Angiosperms
- Clade: Monocots
- Order: Asparagales
- Family: Iridaceae
- Genus: Dierama
- Species: D. atrum

Binomial name
- Dierama atrum N.E.Br.

Species of flowering plant

Dierama atrum is a perennial geophyte that is part of the Iridaceae family. The species is endemic to South Africa and occurs in the Eastern Cape.
