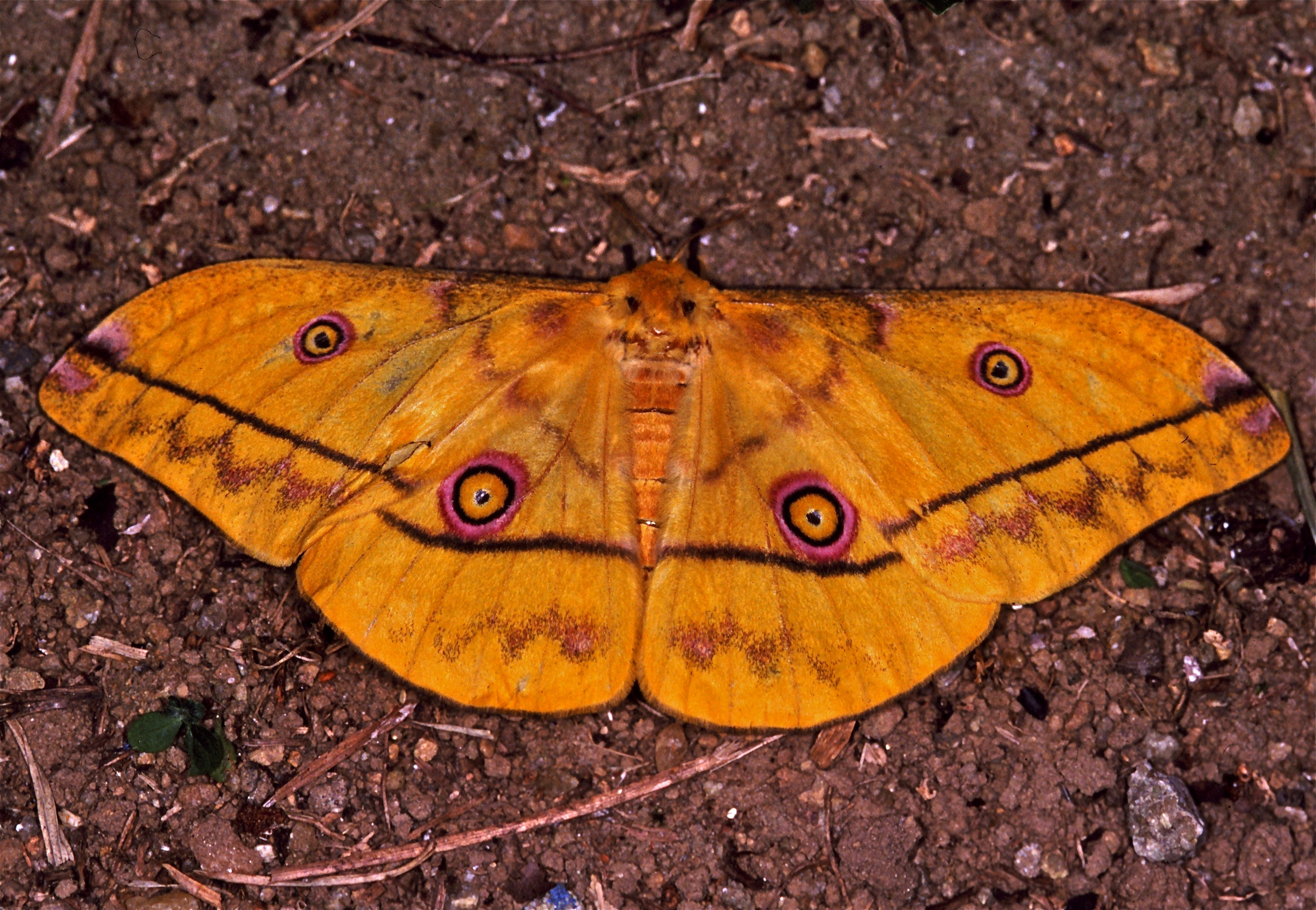
- Nudaurelia dione

Scientific classification
- Domain: Eukaryota
- Kingdom: Animalia
- Phylum: Arthropoda
- Class: Insecta
- Order: Lepidoptera
- Family: Saturniidae
- Tribe: Bunaeini
- Genus: Nudaurelia; Rothschild, 1895

= Nudaurelia =

Genus of moths

Nudaurelia is a genus of moths in the family Saturniidae first described by Rothschild in 1895.

== Species ==
- Nudaurelia aethiops Rothschild, 1907
- Nudaurelia allardiana Rougeot, 1971
- Nudaurelia alopia (Westwood, 1849)
- Nudaurelia amathusia Weymer, 1909
- Nudaurelia anna (Maassen & Weymer, 1885)
- Nudaurelia antelata Darge, 2003
- Nudaurelia anthina (Karsch, 1892)
- Nudaurelia anthinoides Rougeot, 1978
- Nudaurelia bamendana (Schultze, 1914)
- Nudaurelia belayneshae Rougeot, 1978
- Nudaurelia benguelensis (Oberthuer, 1921)
- Nudaurelia bicolor Bouvier, 1930
- Nudaurelia bouvieri (Le Moult, 1933)
- Nudaurelia broschi Darge, 2002
- Nudaurelia camerunensis Bouvier, 1930
- Nudaurelia capdevillei Rougeot, 1979
- Nudaurelia carnegiei Janse, 1918
- Nudaurelia cleoris (Jordan, 1910)
- Nudaurelia cytherea (Fabricius, 1775)
- Nudaurelia dargei Bouyer, 2008
- Nudaurelia dione (Fabricius, 1793)
- Nudaurelia dionysae Rougeot, 1948
- Nudaurelia eblis (Strecker, 1878)
- Nudaurelia emini (Butler, 1888)
- Nudaurelia fasciata Gaede, 1927
- Nudaurelia flammeola Darge, 2002
- Nudaurelia germaini Bouvier, 1926
- Nudaurelia gschwandneri Rebel, 1917
- Nudaurelia gueinzii (Staudinger, 1872)
- Nudaurelia herbuloti Darge, 1992
- Nudaurelia hurumai Darge, 2003
- Nudaurelia jamesoni (Druce, 1890)
- Nudaurelia kiliensis Darge, 2009
- Nudaurelia kilumilorum Darge, 2002
- Nudaurelia kohlli Darge, 2009
- Nudaurelia krucki Hering, 1930
- Nudaurelia latifasciata Sonthonnax, 1901
- Nudaurelia lutea Bouvier, 1930
- Nudaurelia macrops Rebel, 1917
- Nudaurelia macrothyris (Rothschild, 1906)
- Nudaurelia mariae Bouyer, 2007
- Nudaurelia melanops (Bouvier, 1930)
- Nudaurelia michaelae Darge, 1975
- Nudaurelia mitfordi (Kirby, 1892)
- Nudaurelia murphyi Darge, 1992
- Nudaurelia myrtea Rebel, 1917
- Nudaurelia perscitus Darge, 1992
- Nudaurelia reducta (Rebel, 1917)
- Nudaurelia renvazorum Darge, 2002
- Nudaurelia rhodina (Rothschild, 1907)
- Nudaurelia richelmanni Weymer, 1908
- Nudaurelia rubra Bouvier, 1927
- Nudaurelia rubricostalis Kirby, 1892
- Nudaurelia staudingeri (Aurivillius, 1893)
- Nudaurelia ungemachti Bouvier, 1926
- Nudaurelia wahlbergi (Boisduval, 1847)
- Nudaurelia wahlbergina Rougeot, 1972
- Nudaurelia xanthomma Rothschild, 1907
