= Dierama insigne =

Scientific classification
- Kingdom: Plantae
- Clade: Tracheophytes
- Clade: Angiosperms
- Clade: Monocots
- Order: Asparagales
- Family: Iridaceae
- Genus: Dierama
- Species: D. insigne

Binomial name
- Dierama insigne N.E.Br.

Synonyms
- Dierama davyi N.E.Br.; Dierama rupestre N.E.Br.

Species of flowering plant

Dierama insigne is a perennial geophyte that is part of the Iridaceae family. The species is endemic to South Africa and occurs in KwaZulu-Natal and Mpumalanga.
