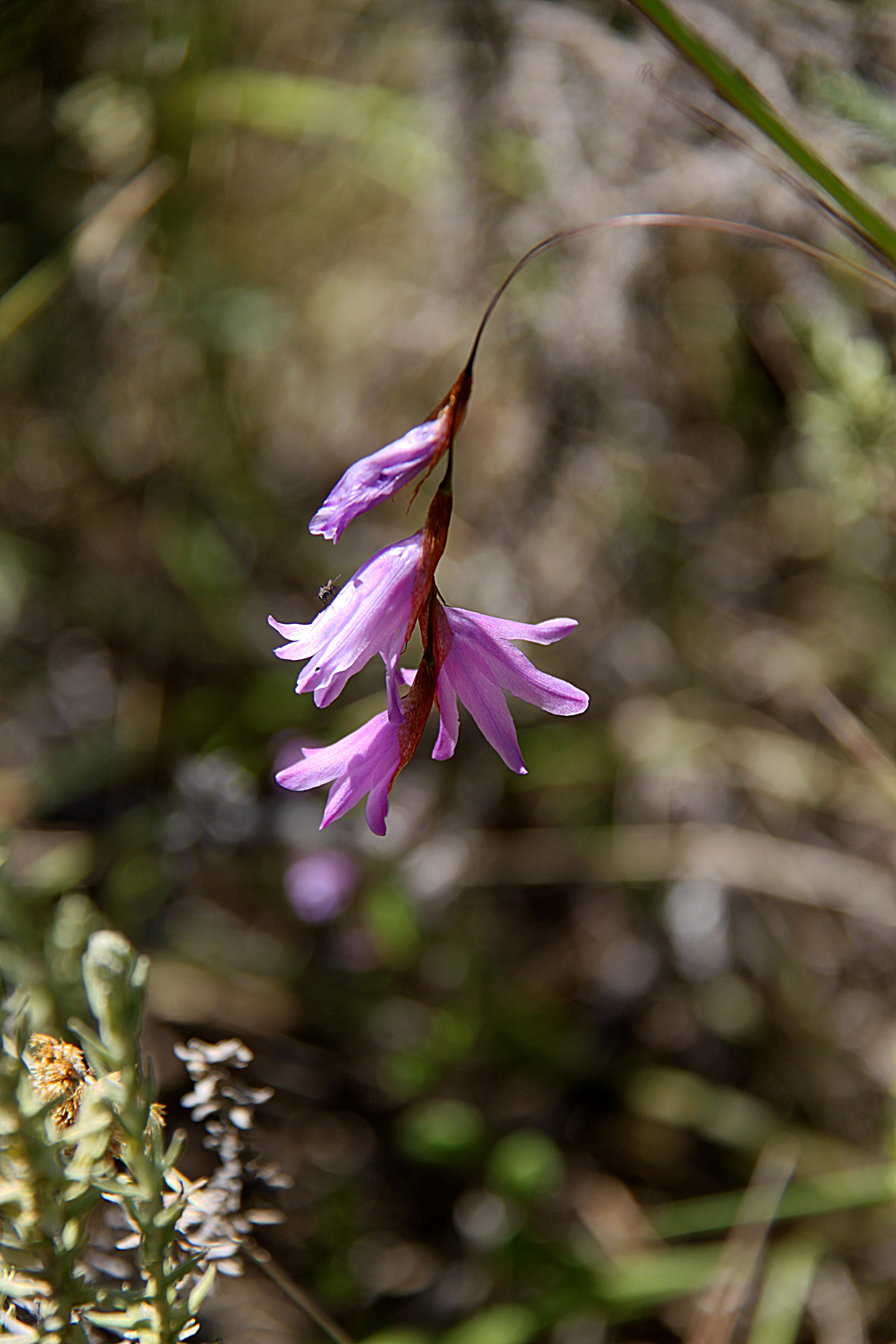

Scientific classification
- Kingdom: Plantae
- Clade: Tracheophytes
- Clade: Angiosperms
- Clade: Monocots
- Order: Asparagales
- Family: Iridaceae
- Genus: Dierama
- Species: D. cupuliflorum

Binomial name
- Dierama cupuliflorum Klatt

= Dierama cupuliflorum =

Species of flowering plant

Dierama cupuliflorum is a perennial geophyte that is part of the Iridaceae family. The species is native to Ethiopia, Kenya, Malawi, Tanzania, and Uganda.

It was first described by Friedrich Wilhelm Klatt.
