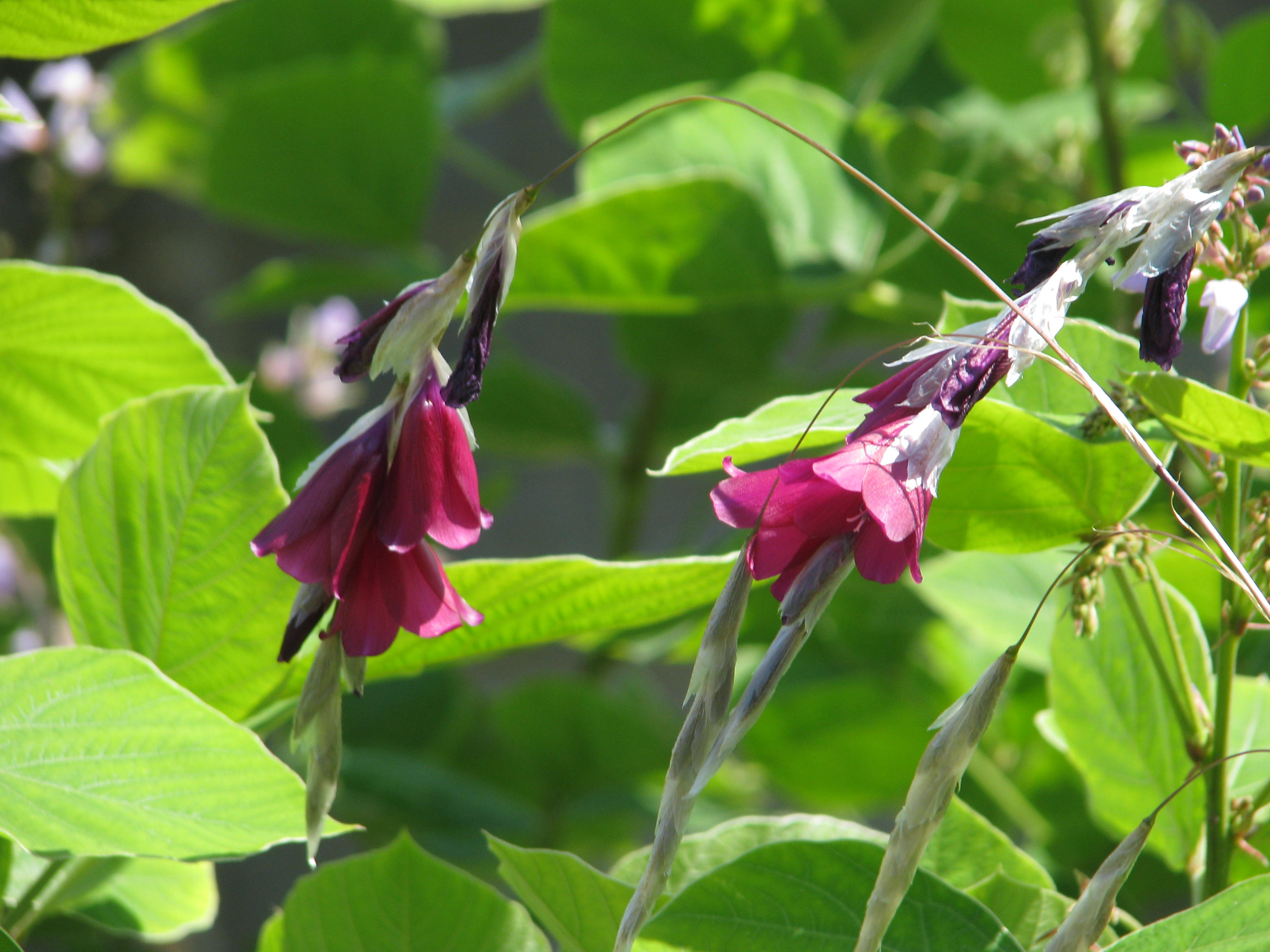

Scientific classification
- Kingdom: Plantae
- Clade: Tracheophytes
- Clade: Angiosperms
- Clade: Monocots
- Order: Asparagales
- Family: Iridaceae
- Genus: Dierama
- Species: D. reynoldsii

Binomial name
- Dierama reynoldsii I.Verd.

= Dierama reynoldsii =

Species of flowering plant

Dierama reynoldsii is a perennial geophyte that is part of the Iridaceae family. The species is endemic to South Africa and occurs in KwaZulu-Natal and the Eastern Cape.
