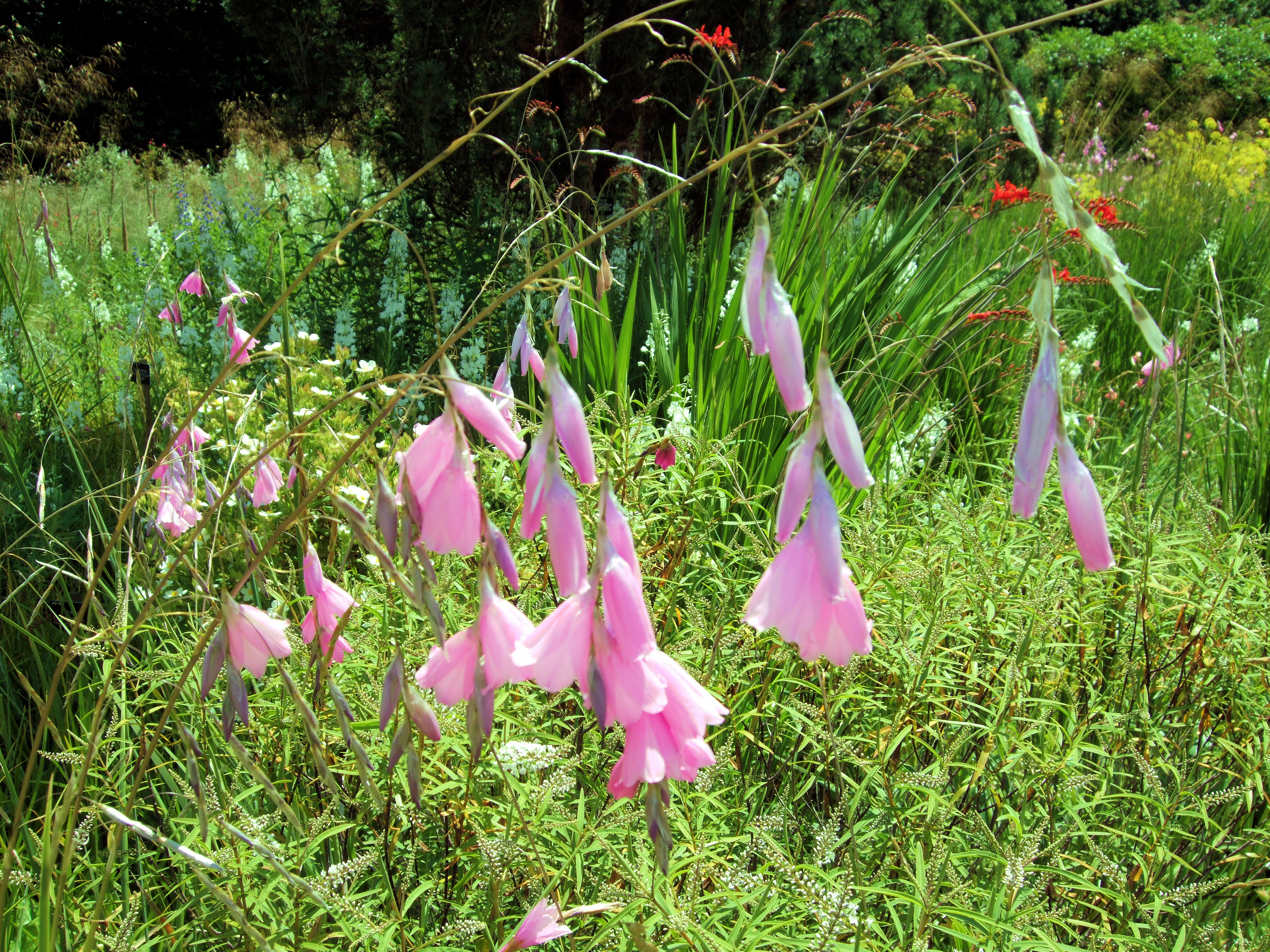

Scientific classification
- Kingdom: Plantae
- Clade: Tracheophytes
- Clade: Angiosperms
- Clade: Monocots
- Order: Asparagales
- Family: Iridaceae
- Genus: Dierama
- Species: D. pulcherrimum

Binomial name
- Dierama pulcherrimum (Hook.f.) Baker

Synonyms
- Dierama longiflorum G.J.Lewis; Sparaxis pulcherrima Hook.f.; Sparaxis pulcherrima var. major J.R.Duncan & V.C.Davies

= Dierama pulcherrimum =

Species of plant

Dierama pulcherrimum, angel's fishing rod, is a species of flowering plant in the iris family Iridaceae, native to the southeastern Cape Provinces of South Africa. Growing to 1.5 m (4.9 ft) tall by 0.5 m (1.6 ft) broad, it is an arching evergreen perennial with drooping rosy pink bell-shaped flowers in summer.

It was introduced to British gardeners in 1866 by the Yorkshire botanist James Backhouse. Common names include angel's fishing rod, hair bell, and wand flower. It is hardy but requires a sheltered position in full sun.

The Latin specific epithet pulcherrimum means "most beautiful".
