= Dierama parviflorum =

Scientific classification
- Kingdom: Plantae
- Clade: Tracheophytes
- Clade: Angiosperms
- Clade: Monocots
- Order: Asparagales
- Family: Iridaceae
- Genus: Dierama
- Species: D. parviflorum

Binomial name
- Dierama parviflorum Marais

Species of flowering plant

Dierama parviflorum is a species of flowering plant in the family Iridaceae. It is a perennial geophyte that is native to the Democratic Republic of the Congo, Malawi, Tanzania and Zambia. It was first described by Wessel Marais in 1988.
