= Dierama pallidum =

Scientific classification
- Kingdom: Plantae
- Clade: Tracheophytes
- Clade: Angiosperms
- Clade: Monocots
- Order: Asparagales
- Family: Iridaceae
- Genus: Dierama
- Species: D. pallidum

Binomial name
- Dierama pallidum Hilliard

Species of flowering plant

Dierama pallidum is a perennial geophyte that is part of the Iridaceae family. The species is endemic to South Africa and occurs in KwaZulu-Natal. The species has a range of less than 832 km^{2} and occurs from Pietermaritzburg to Durban and the Valley of a Thousand Hills.
