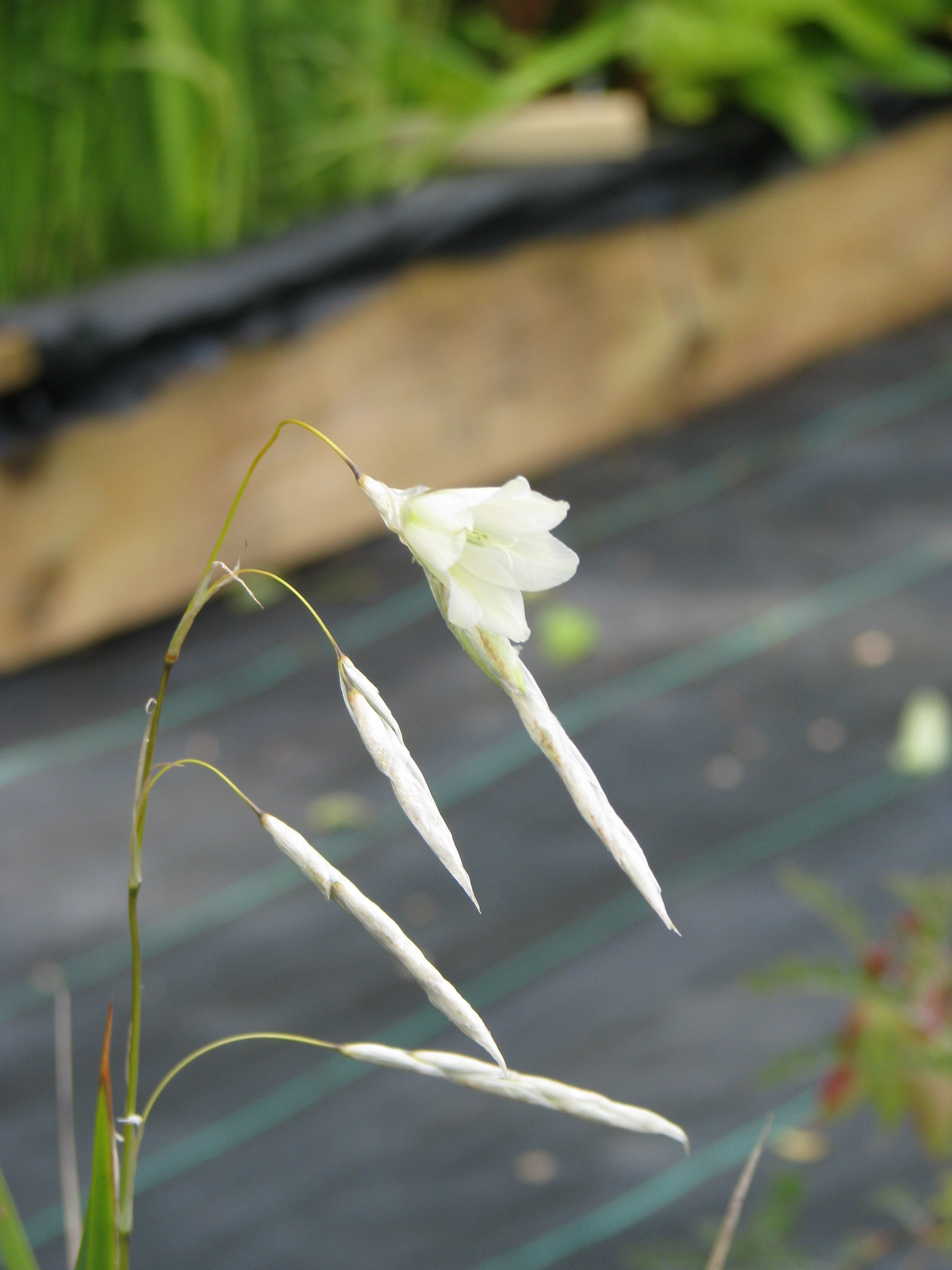

Scientific classification
- Kingdom: Plantae
- Clade: Tracheophytes
- Clade: Angiosperms
- Clade: Monocots
- Order: Asparagales
- Family: Iridaceae
- Genus: Dierama
- Species: D. argyreum

Binomial name
- Dierama argyreum L.Bolus

Synonyms
- Dierama argyreum var. majus N.E.Br.

= Dierama argyreum =

Species of flowering plant

Dierama argyreum is a perennial geophyte that is part of the Iridaceae family. The species is endemic to South Africa and occurs in KwaZulu-Natal and the Eastern Cape.
