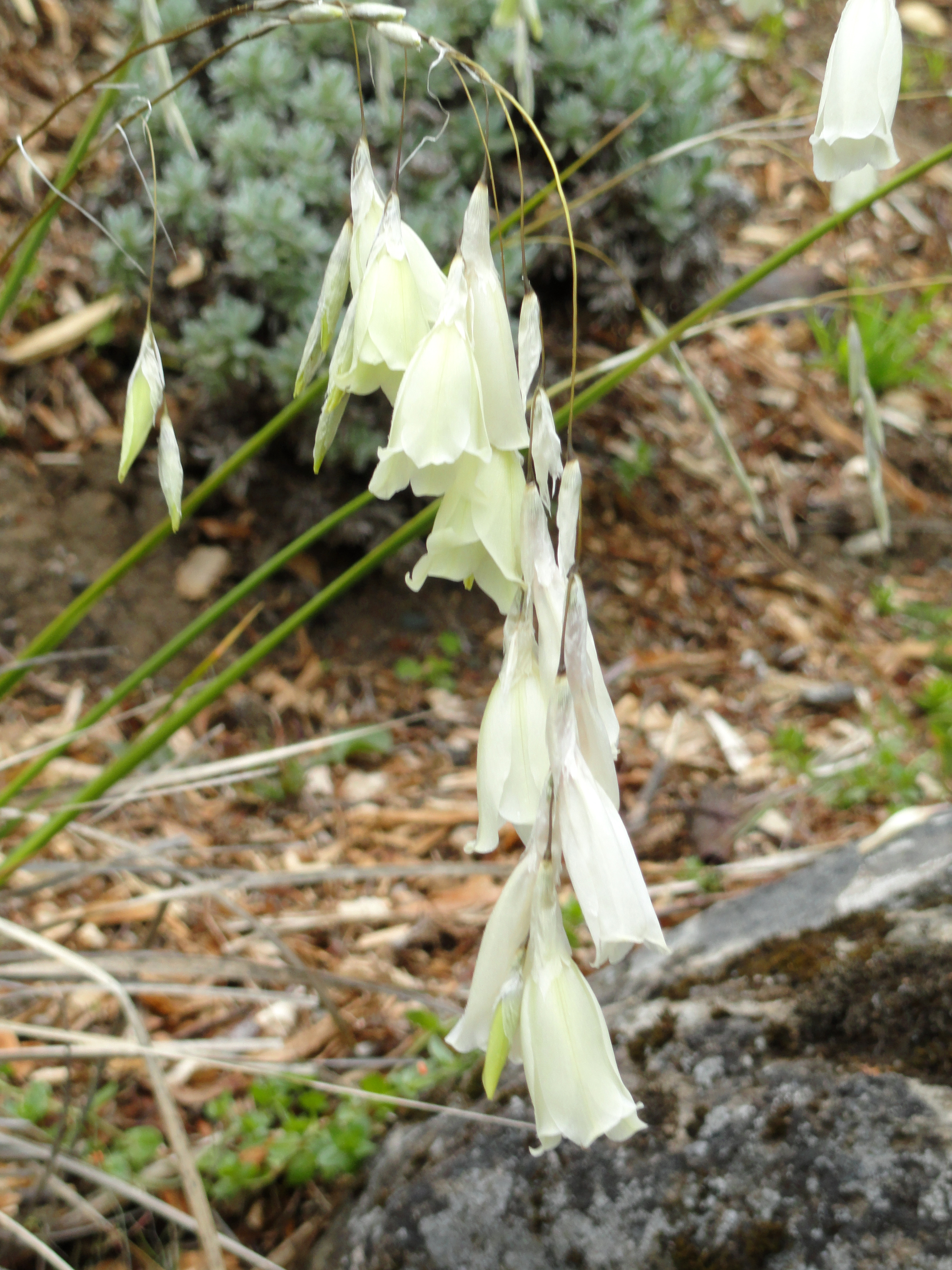

Scientific classification
- Kingdom: Plantae
- Clade: Tracheophytes
- Clade: Angiosperms
- Clade: Monocots
- Order: Asparagales
- Family: Iridaceae
- Genus: Dierama
- Species: D. luteoalbidum

Binomial name
- Dierama luteoalbidum I.Verd.

= Dierama luteoalbidum =

Species of flowering plant

Dierama luteoalbidum is a perennial geophyte that is part of the Iridaceae family. The species is endemic to South Africa and occurs in the KwaZulu-Natal Midlands. It has a range of 1 200 - 5 500 km^{2} and there are eight to ten subpopulations. The species has lost habitat to plantations and overgrazing is also a threat.
