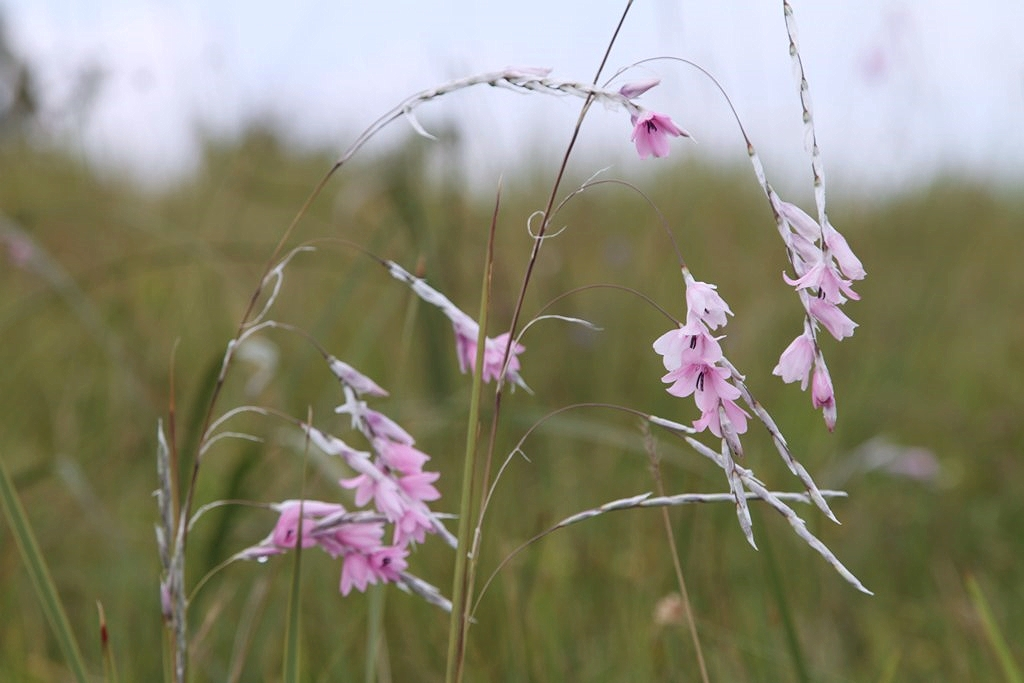

Conservation status
- Least Concern (IUCN 3.1)

Scientific classification
- Kingdom: Plantae
- Clade: Tracheophytes
- Clade: Angiosperms
- Clade: Monocots
- Order: Asparagales
- Family: Iridaceae
- Genus: Dierama
- Species: D. latifolium

Binomial name
- Dierama latifolium N.E.Br.

Synonyms
- Dierama pansum N.E.Br.

= Dierama latifolium =

Species of flowering plant

Dierama latifolium is a perennial geophyte that is part of the Iridaceae family. The species is endemic to South Africa and occurs in KwaZulu-Natal and the Eastern Cape.
