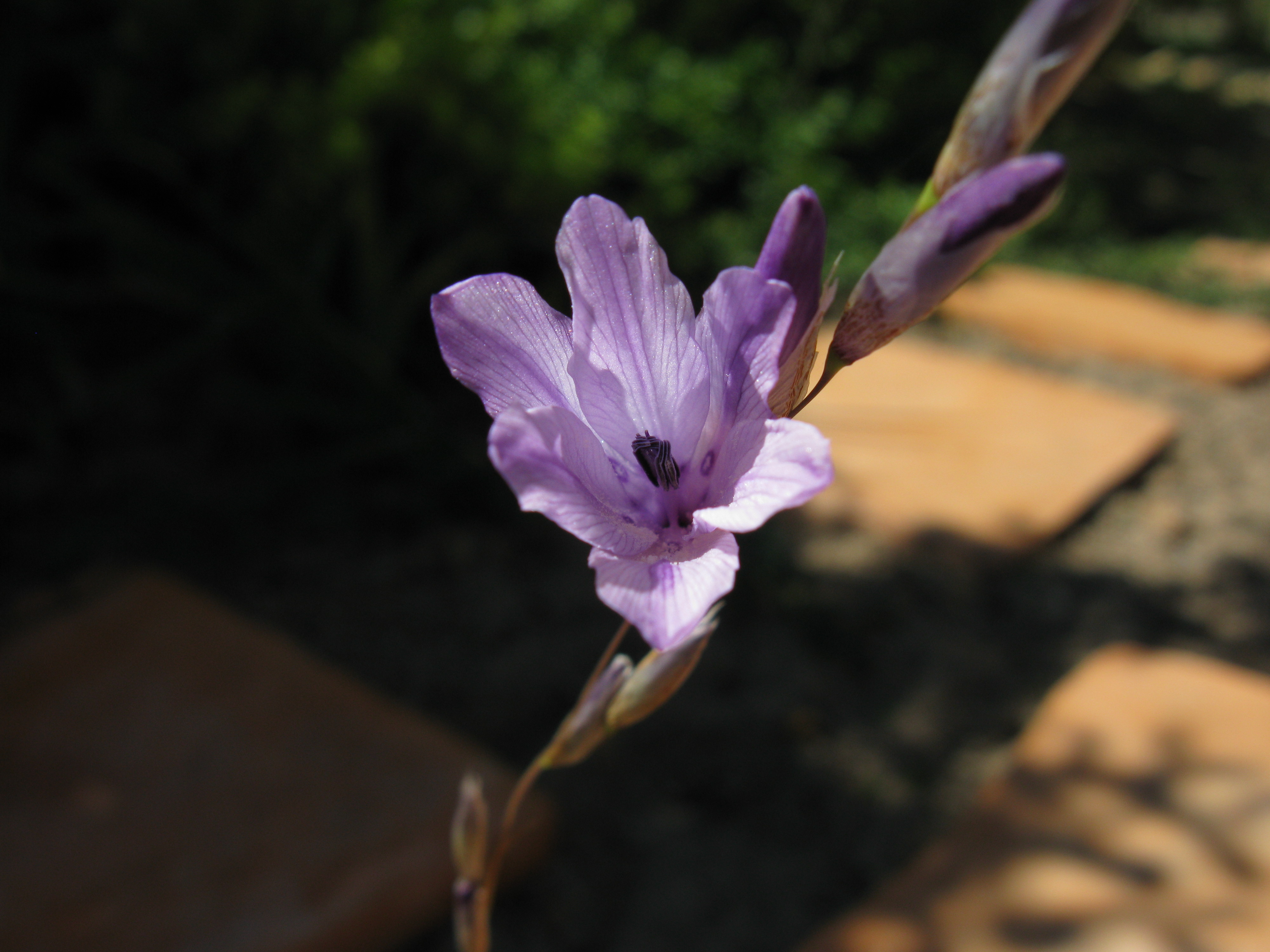

Conservation status
- Vulnerable (IUCN 3.1)

Scientific classification
- Kingdom: Plantae
- Clade: Tracheophytes
- Clade: Angiosperms
- Clade: Monocots
- Order: Asparagales
- Family: Iridaceae
- Genus: Dierama
- Species: D. nixonianum

Binomial name
- Dierama nixonianum Hilliard

= Dierama nixonianum =

Species of flowering plant

Dierama nixonianum is a perennial geophyte that is part of the Iridaceae family. The species is endemic to South Africa and occurs in KwaZulu-Natal. The species has a distribution area of less than 1000 km^{2} and occurs from the KwaZulu-Natal Midlands to Wakkerstroom.
