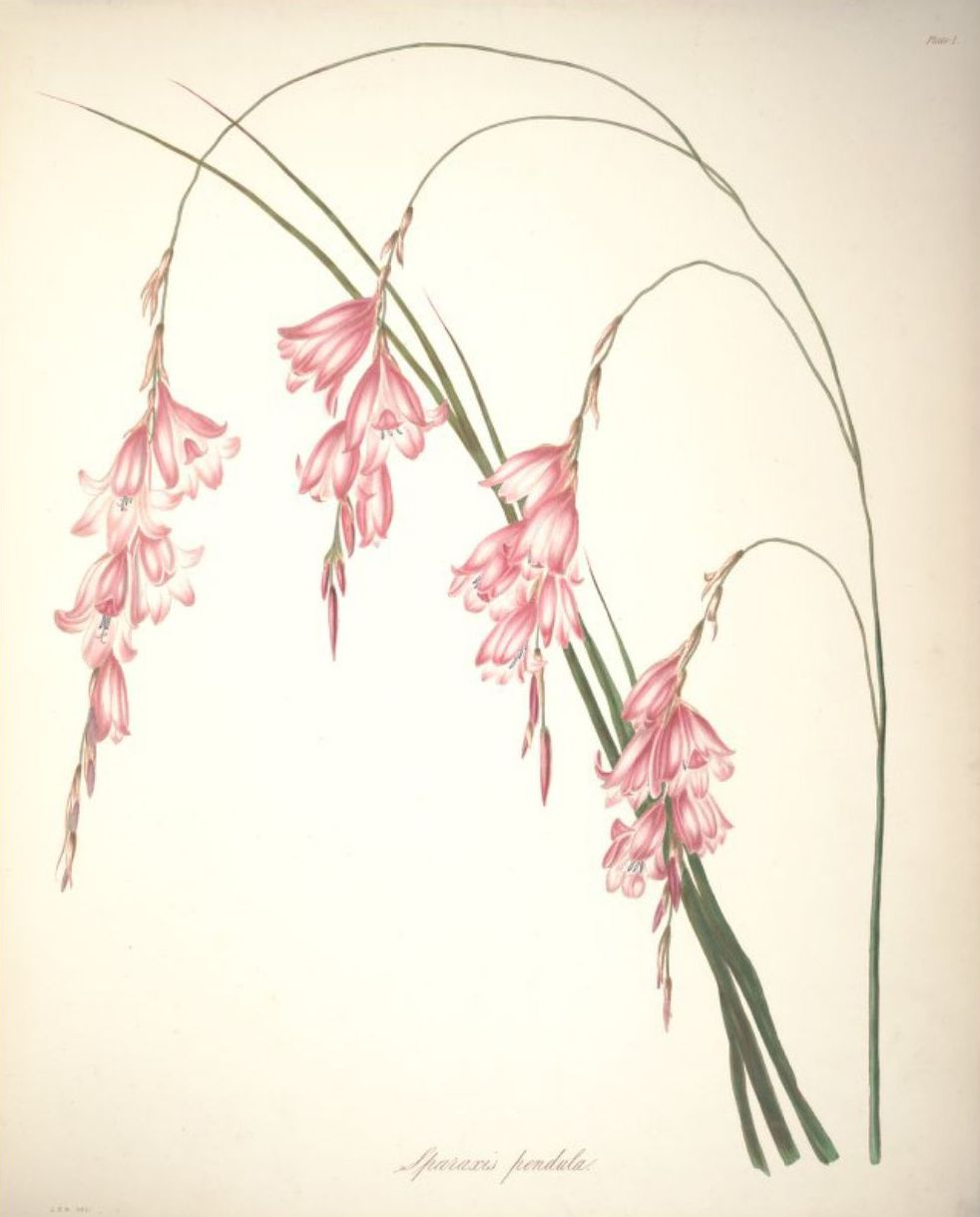
- Dierama pendulum by Arabella Elizabeth Roupell

Scientific classification
- Kingdom: Plantae
- Clade: Tracheophytes
- Clade: Angiosperms
- Clade: Monocots
- Order: Asparagales
- Family: Iridaceae
- Genus: Dierama
- Species: D. pendulum

Binomial name
- Dierama pendulum (L.f.) Baker

Synonyms
- Dierama ensifolium K.Koch & C.D.Bouché; Ixia pendula L.f.; Sparaxis pendula (L.f.) Ker Gawl.; Watsonia palustris Pers.

= Dierama pendulum =

Species of plant

Dierama pendulum, commonly known as fairy bell, hair bell and wedding bell, is a species of Iridaceae endemic to the Eastern Cape in South Africa and first collected in 1772 by the Swedish naturalist Carl Peter Thunberg near Essenbos on the Kromme River or Kromrivier which flows down the Langkloof. In 1845 the genus Dierama was established by Karl Koch (1809-1879) based on this specimen. Before that the plant had been placed in various genera including Ixia, Sparaxis and Watsonia. The species name has been misapplied to D. inyangense, D. densiflorum and to D. plowesii.

'Dierama' is Greek for 'funnel' and describes the flower's shape, while 'pendulum' is the Latin word for hanging suspended. The plant is some 2 metres tall with extremely slender and wiry stems, dividing into hair-like branches, flexing gracefully under the weight of the flowers, and nodding readily in the lightest of breezes. As do all species in the genus, it has a large flattened corm covered in layers of tunics made up of dry fibres. A new corm is formed every growing season, the old defunct corms remaining intact for many years, stacked one above the other. It grows in dense and fairly extensive tufts from Knysna to the Amatolas in the Eastern Cape and, when not in flower, the tall, slender, rigid leaves resemble those of a coarse sedge. The flower colour ranges from pink to pure white, while the tough, rounded capsule contains numerous angular brown seeds.

== Medicinal use ==
The (Southern) Sotho people of the Kingdom of Lesotho use a decoction of the corm of Dierama pendulum as an enema with strongly purgative properties.

== Bibliography ==
- Dierama: The Hairbells of Africa - Olive Mary Hilliard & Brian Laurence Burtt (1991).
