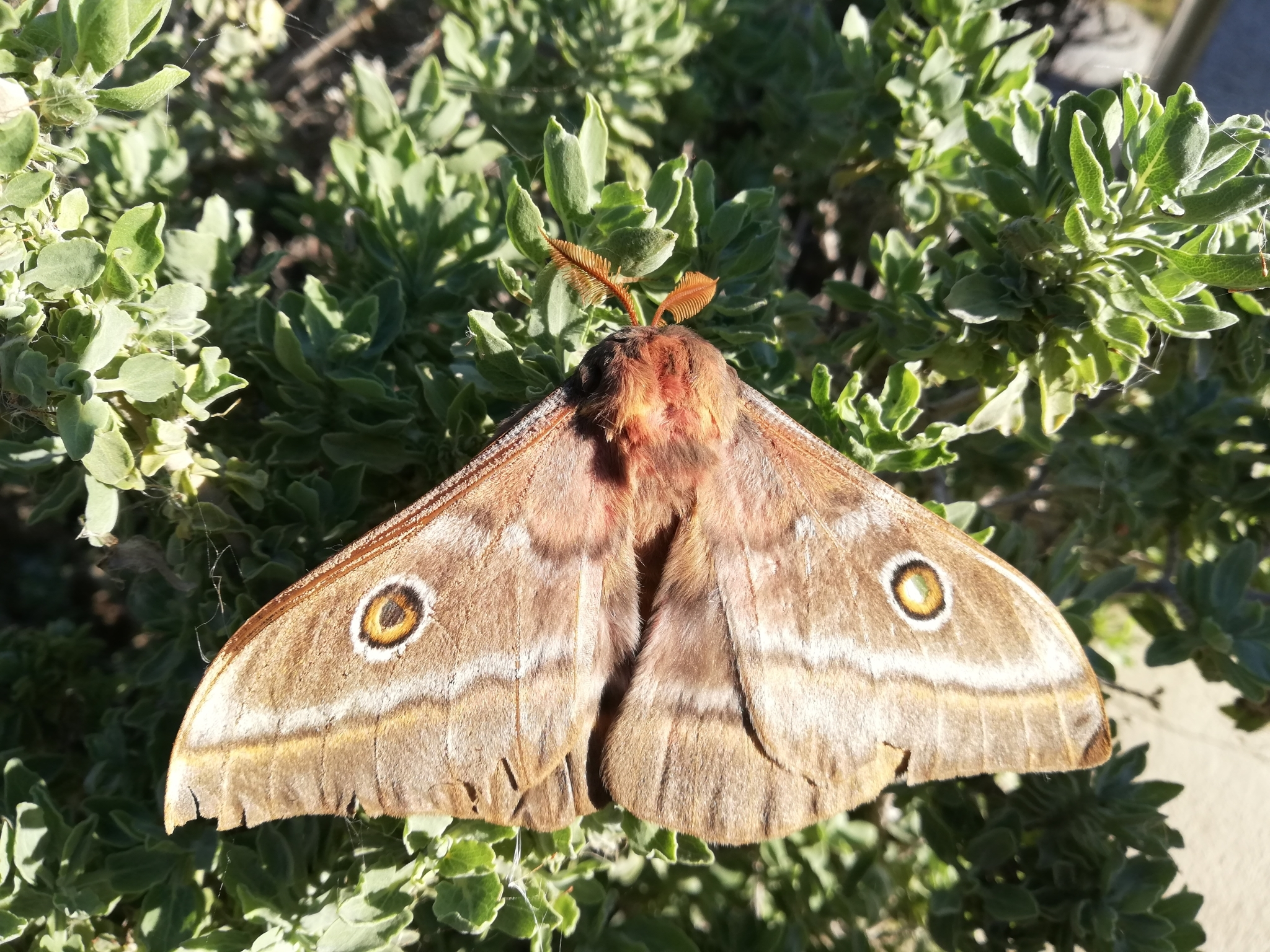
- Adult
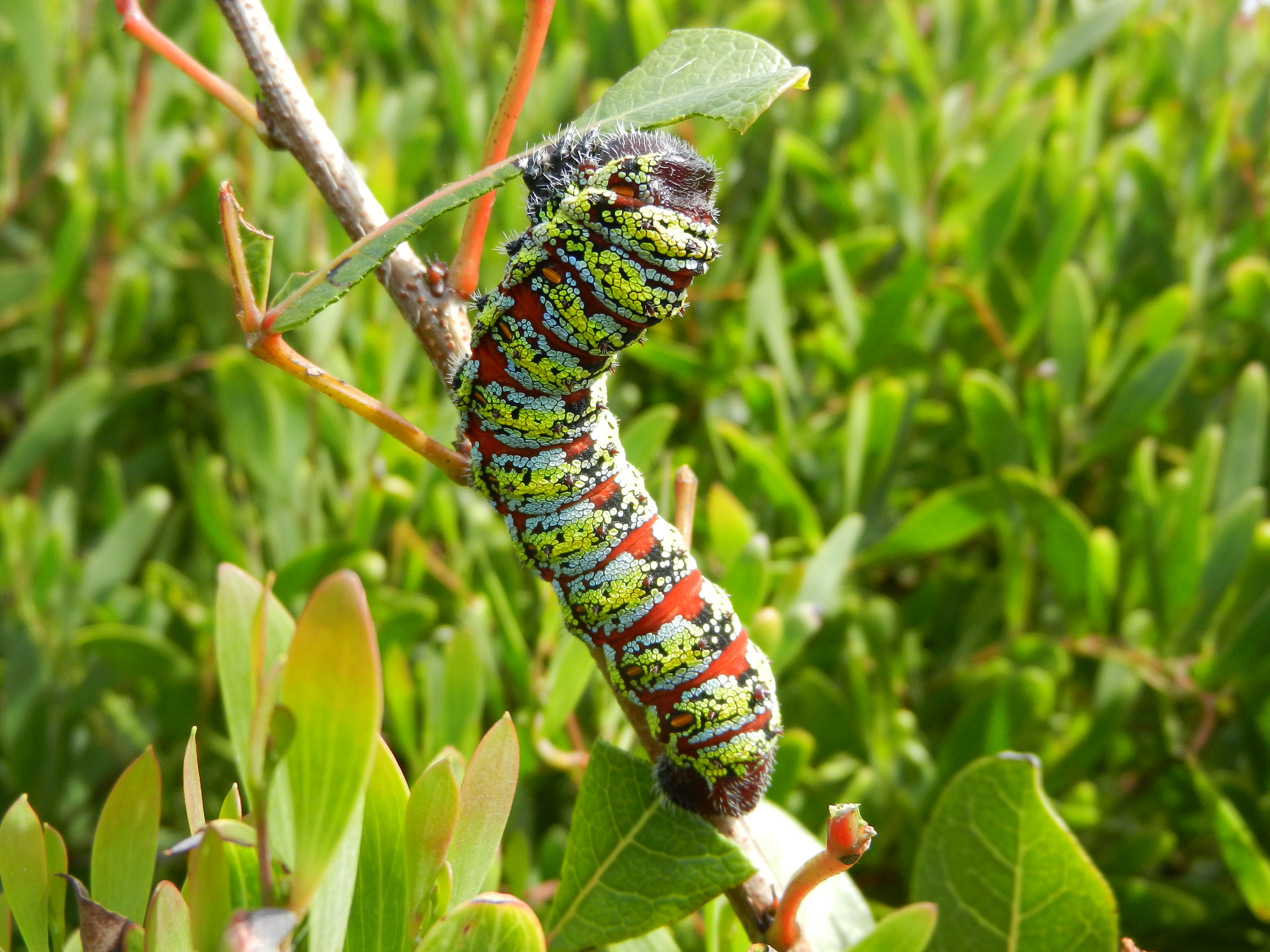
- Larva

Scientific classification
- Kingdom: Animalia
- Phylum: Arthropoda
- Clade: Pancrustacea
- Class: Insecta
- Order: Lepidoptera
- Family: Saturniidae
- Genus: Nudaurelia
- Species: N. cytherea

Binomial name
- Nudaurelia cytherea (Fabricius, 1775)

Synonyms
- Bombyx cytherea Fabricius; Antheraea cytherea; Attacus capensis Cramer; Bombyx hesperus Zulz.

= Nudaurelia cytherea =

Christmas caterpillar

Species of moth

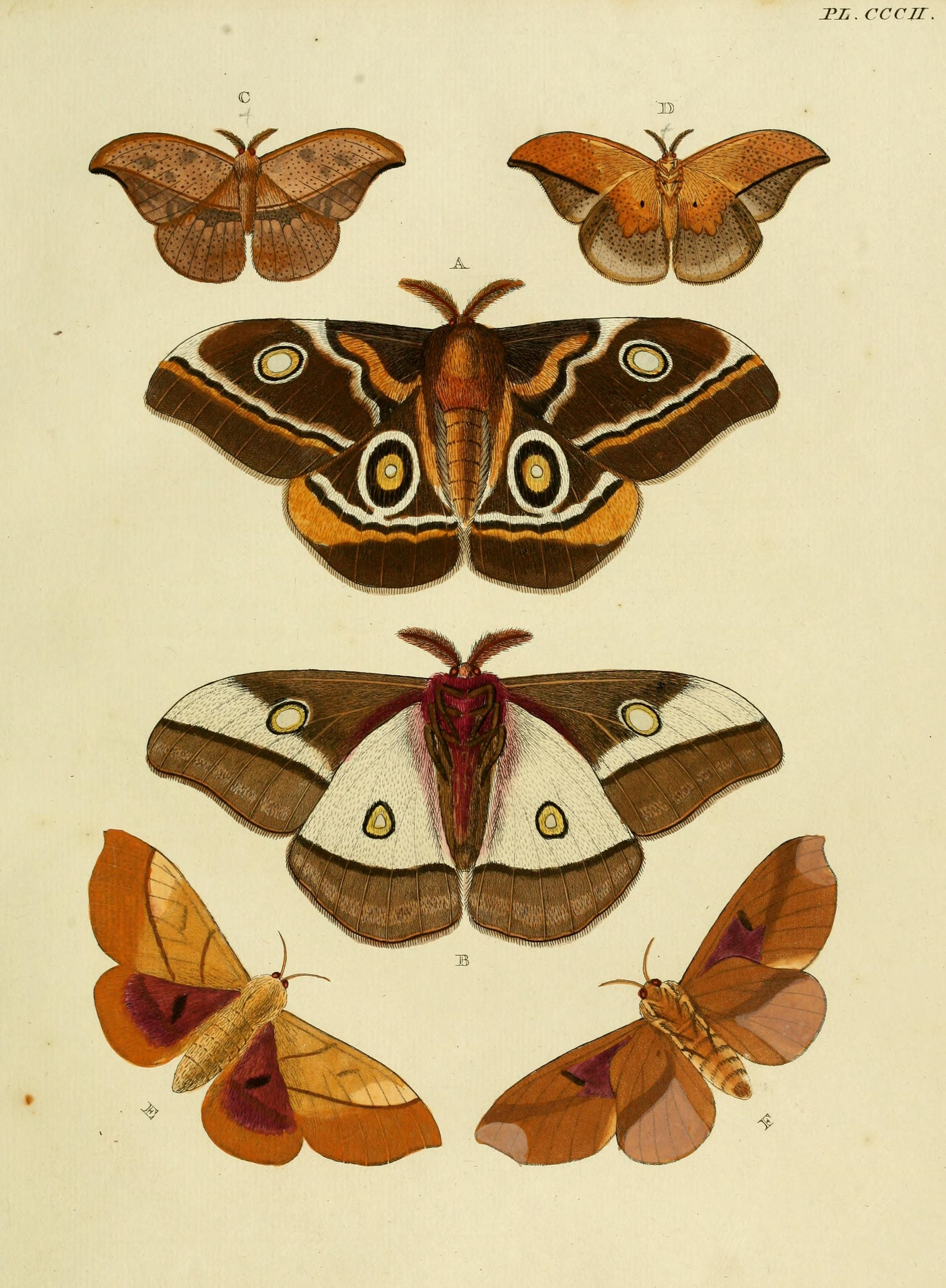
A and B – views from above and below of male Nudaurelia cytherea capensis from De Uitlandsche Kapellen

Nudaurelia cytherea, also called the pine tree emperor moth or Christmas caterpillar due to its festive colouration, is a southern African member of the family Saturniidae. The family has large edible caterpillars which are an important source of protein for the Bantu peoples of southern Africa. The genus Nudaurelia is closely related to Gonimbrasia and Imbrasia. The species was first described by Johan Christian Fabricius in 1775.

The larva has a wide-ranging taste in food plants, and readily added the needles of introduced pines to its diet, causing widespread defoliation in South African plantations in the 1930s, especially in the Lebanon and Franschhoek plantations of the Western Cape. The pines included Pinus canariensis, P. halepensis, P. radiata, P. longifolia, P. muricata and P. pinaster. Other exotic species included Acacia mollissima, Cupressus macrocarpa, Eucalyptus cladocalyx, E. diversicolor, E. globulus, E. ovata, E. paniculata, E. pilularis, Liriodendron tulipifera, apple, guava and quince. Its food plants before the introduction of exotic species had included Euclea species, Rapanea melanophloeos, Protea repens, Rhus angustifolia, Watsonia species and Myrica cordifolia - Pinus radiata and Rhus angustifolia being most sought after, with feeding migrations to other species being only incidental.

Eggs and caterpillars are sought out by a variety of hymenopteran parasitoids such as Hockeria crassa, Hockeria nudaureliae, Pediobius species, Anastatus species and Mesocomys pulchriceps, while the larvae are infected naturally by at least five distinct virus species, including Nudaurelia β virus, producing fairly regular epizootics. Insect viruses have long been valued as biological control agents, since they have few negative effects on ecosystems compared with chemical pesticides. Their most important quality is that they require no follow-up or management, while their host specificity is a great advantage over most chemical pesticides which are not. Other mammalian controlling factors are baboons, feral pigs and porcupines, all of which relish the larvae, pupae and moths. Pigs were introduced to Western Cape pine plantations by the Forestry Department in the 1930s, and proved to be a cheap and effective control measure, their acute sense of smell enabling them to easily detect pupae under the soil surface.

== Life history stages ==
Eggs are 2 mm long and near-ellipsoidal in shape, with the shell smooth and unsculpted. Eggs are usually laid in clusters of 3–200 in the foliage of the upper crown, while a small number are laid on the trunk near the ground. After hatching the shells are consumed over a period of two to three days by the young larvae, a process that triggers their plant-feeding response and so plays an important role in their development. Incubation of the eggs laid in mid-summer takes about 18 or 19 days, and 21 to 28 days for those laid in winter.

Larvae go through six moults and are highly gregarious till the end of the second moult. After the second moult the larvae acquire their gaudy colouring of bands of blue, green and yellow spots on a deep maroon ground colour. Full development takes from 6 to 8 weeks, and when mature the caterpillar is between 100 and 125 mm long. The mature larvae or caterpillars crawl to the ground and search for a patch of soft soil, burrowing to a depth of about 50 mm. After several days the skin splits along the dorsal line.

Pupae are dark red at first, but after a few days becomes dull black and hard. The pupal stage lasts from 5 to 6 months. When the moth is about to emerge the pupa works its way to the soil surface, the pupal case splits and the moth emerges. The moth climbs a small distance up a tree or shrub and then allows the wings to expand and harden, a process taking some 30 minutes. Adult moths survive for only a few days, long enough to mate and for the female to lay about 200 eggs on a suitable food plant.

Adult moths show considerable variation in size, but on average have a 125–150 mm wingspan, the body being about 50 mm long and densely covered in silky hair. Colouration and markings differ only slightly between the sexes. Antennae of the male are broadly comb-like (pectinate), while those of the female are almost linear and only slightly serrate.
