= List of Polyscias species =

Polyscias is a genus of plants in the family Araliaceae. As of November 2025, Plants of the World Online accepted 181 species.

== A-B ==
- Polyscias aculeata (Decne. & Planch.) Harms
- Polyscias acuminata (Wight) Seem.
- Polyscias aemiliguineae Bernardi
- Polyscias aequatoguineensis Lejoly & Lisowski
- Polyscias aherniana (Merr.) Lowry & G.M.Plunkett
- Polyscias albersiana Harms
- Polyscias alternifolia (Maingay ex Ridl.) Lowry & G.M.Plunkett
- Polyscias amplifolia (Baker) Harms
- Polyscias anacardium Bernardi
- Polyscias andraerum Bernardi
- Polyscias angustifolia (Ridl.) Lowry & G.M.Plunkett
- Polyscias ariadnes Bernardi
- Polyscias ashtonii (Philipson) Lowry & G.M.Plunkett
- Polyscias aubrevillei (Bernardi) Bernardi
- Polyscias australiana (F.Muell.) Philipson
- Polyscias baehniana (Bernardi) Bernardi
- Polyscias balansae (Baill.) Harms
- Polyscias balfouriana (André) L.H.Bailey
- Polyscias baretiana Bernardi
- Polyscias belensis Philipson
- Polyscias bellendenkeriensis (F.M.Bailey) Philipson
- Polyscias bernardiana Lowry & Callm.
- Polyscias bernieri (Baill. ex Drake) R.Vig.
- Polyscias biformis (Philipson) Lowry & G.M.Plunkett
- Polyscias bipinnata (Gibbs) Philipson
- Polyscias bisattenuata (Sherff) Lowry & G.M.Plunkett
- Polyscias boivinii (Seem.) Bernardi
- Polyscias borbonica Marais
- Polyscias borneensis Philipson
- Polyscias botryophora Harms
- Polyscias bracteata (R.Vig.) Lowry
- Polyscias briquetiana (Bernardi) Lowry & G.M.Plunkett

== C-H ==
- Polyscias carolorum Bernardi
- Polyscias cenabrei (Merr.) Lowry & G.M.Plunkett
- Polyscias chapelieri (Drake) Harms ex R.Vig.
- Polyscias cissiflora (Baker) Harms
- Polyscias cissodendron (C.Moore & F.Muell.) Harms
- Polyscias collina (Philipson) Lowry & G.M.Plunkett
- Polyscias compacta Lowry & G.M.Plunkett
- Polyscias confertifolia (Baker) Harms
- Polyscias coriacea Marais
- Polyscias corticata Gibbs
- Polyscias crassa (Hemsl.) Lowry & G.M.Plunkett
- Polyscias crenata (Pancher & Sebert) Frodin
- Polyscias culminicola A.C.Sm.
- Polyscias cumingiana (C.Presl) Fern.-Vill.
- Polyscias cussonioides (Drake) Bernardi
- Polyscias cutispongia (Lam.) Baker
- Polyscias dichrostachya Baker
- Polyscias dioica (Vieill. ex Pancher & Sebert) Harms
- Polyscias diversifolia (Blume) Lowry & G.M.Plunkett
- Polyscias duplicata (Thouars ex Baill.) Lowry & G.M.Plunkett
- Polyscias elegans (C.Moore & F.Muell.) Harms
- Polyscias elliptica (Blume) Lowry & G.M.Plunkett
- Polyscias engganoense (Philipson) Lowry & G.M.Plunkett
- Polyscias eupteronoides (Teijsm. & Binn.) Frodin
- Polyscias farinosa (Delile) Harms
- Polyscias felicis Bernardi
- Polyscias filicifolia (C.Moore ex E.Fourn.) L.H.Bailey
- Polyscias floccosa (Drake) Bernardi
- Polyscias florosa Philipson
- Polyscias flynnii (Lowry & K.R.Wood) Lowry & G.M.Plunkett
- Polyscias fraxinifolia (Baker) R.Vig.
- Polyscias fruticosa (L.) Harms
- Polyscias fulva (Hiern) Harms
- Polyscias gracilis Marais
- Polyscias gruschvitzkii Bernardi
- Polyscias guilfoylei (W.Bull) L.H.Bailey
- Polyscias gymnocarpa (Hillebr.) Lowry & G.M.Plunkett
- Polyscias havilandii (Ridl.) Lowry & G.M.Plunkett
- Polyscias hawaiensis (A.Gray) Lowry & G.M.Plunkett
- Polyscias heineana Bernardi
- Polyscias humbertiana (Bernardi) Lowry & G.M.Plunkett

== J-M ==
- Polyscias jackiana (G.Don) Lowry & G.M.Plunkett
- Polyscias jacobsii Philipson
- Polyscias javanica Koord. & Valeton
- Polyscias joskei Gibbs
- Polyscias kalabenonensis Lowry & Callm.
- Polyscias kavaiensis (H.Mann) Lowry & G.M.Plunkett
- Polyscias kikuyuensis Summerh.
- Polyscias kivuensis Bamps
- Polyscias kjellbergii (Philipson) Lowry & G.M.Plunkett
- Polyscias koordersii (Harms) Frodin
- Polyscias lallanii R.Kr.Singh & Sanjeet Kumar
- Polyscias lancifolia (Drake) R.Vig.
- Polyscias lantzii (Drake) R.Vig.
- Polyscias lanutoensis (Hochr.) Lowry & G.M.Plunkett
- Polyscias leandriana (Bernardi) Lowry & G.M.Plunkett
- Polyscias lecardii (R.Vig.) Lowry
- Polyscias ledermannii Harms
- Polyscias letestui C.Norman
- Polyscias lionnetii (F.Friedmann) Lowry & G.M.Plunkett
- Polyscias lydgatei (Hillebr.) Lowry & G.M.Plunkett
- Polyscias macgillivrayi (Benth.) Harms
- Polyscias mackeei Lowry & G.M.Plunkett
- Polyscias macrantha (Philipson) Lowry & G.M.Plunkett
- Polyscias macrocarpa (Philipson & Bui) Lowry & G.M.Plunkett
- Polyscias madagascariensis (Seem.) Harms
- Polyscias maraisiana Lowry & G.M.Plunkett
- Polyscias maralia (Schult.) Bernardi
- Polyscias marchionensis (F.Br.) Lowry & G.M.Plunkett
- Polyscias mauritiana Marais
- Polyscias mayottensis Lowry, O.Pascal & Labat
- Polyscias meliifolia (Craib) Lowry & G.M.Plunkett
- Polyscias microbotrys (Baill.) Harms
- Polyscias mollis (Benth.) Harms
- Polyscias montana (Ridl.) Lowry & G.M.Plunkett
- Polyscias multibracteata (Baker) Harms
- Polyscias multijuga (A.Gray) Harms
- Polyscias muraltana Bernardi
- Polyscias murrayi (F.Muell.) Harms
- Polyscias myrsine Bernardi

== N-R ==
- Polyscias neraudiana (Drake) Harms ex R.Vig.
- Polyscias nodosa (Blume) Seem.
- Polyscias nossibiensis (Drake) Harms
- Polyscias oahuensis (A.Gray) Lowry & G.M.Plunkett
- Polyscias obtusifolia Frodin
- Polyscias ornifolia (Baker) Harms
- Polyscias otopyrena (Baill.) Lowry & G.M.Plunkett
- Polyscias pachypedicellata Lowry & Callm.
- Polyscias pacifica (Philipson) Lowry & G.M.Plunkett
- Polyscias palmervandenbroekii Bernardi
- Polyscias pancheri (Baill.) Harms
- Polyscias paniculata (DC.) Baker
- Polyscias papuana (Miq.) Seem.
- Polyscias papyracea (Philipson) Lowry & G.M.Plunkett
- Polyscias paucidens (Miq.) Frodin
- Polyscias pentamera (Baker) Harms
- Polyscias philippinensis (Merr.) Frodin
- Polyscias philipsonii Bernardi
- Polyscias pinnata J.R.Forst. & G.Forst.
- Polyscias pleiosperma (A.Gray) Lowry & G.M.Plunkett
- Polyscias prolifera (Philipson) Lowry & G.M.Plunkett
- Polyscias pulgarensis (Elmer) Lowry & G.M.Plunkett
- Polyscias purpurea C.T.White
- Polyscias quintasii Exell
- Polyscias rainaliorum Bernardi
- Polyscias reineckei Harms
- Polyscias repanda (DC.) Baker
- Polyscias revoluta Lowry & G.M.Plunkett
- Polyscias richardsiae Bamps
- Polyscias rivalsii Bernardi
- Polyscias rodriguesiana (Marais) Lowry & G.M.Plunkett
- Polyscias roemeriana Harms
- Polyscias royenii Philipson
- Polyscias rubiginosa (Ridl.) Lowry & G.M.Plunkett
- Polyscias rufosepala (Ridl.) Lowry & G.M.Plunkett

== S-Z ==
- Polyscias sambucifolia (Sieber ex DC.) Harms
- Polyscias samoensis (A.Gray) Harms
- Polyscias sandwicensis (A.Gray) Lowry & G.M.Plunkett
- Polyscias schmidii Lowry
- Polyscias schultzei Harms
- Polyscias scopoliae (Baill.) Lowry
- Polyscias scutellaria (Burm.f.) Fosberg
- Polyscias sechellarum Baker
- Polyscias serratifolia (Miq.) Lowry & G.M.Plunkett
- Polyscias sessiliflora Marais
- Polyscias sleumeri Philipson
- Polyscias solomonensis (Philipson) Frodin
- Polyscias sorongensis Gibbs
- Polyscias spectabilis (Harms) Lowry & G.M.Plunkett
- Polyscias stonei (A.-L.Lim) Lowry & G.M.Plunkett
- Polyscias stuhlmannii Harms
- Polyscias subcapitata Kaneh.
- Polyscias tafondroensis (Drake) R.Vig.
- Polyscias tahitensis (Nadeaud) Harms
- Polyscias terminalia Bernardi
- Polyscias thailandica Lowry & G.M.Plunkett
- Polyscias tripinnata Harms
- Polyscias verrucosa (Seem.) Lowry & G.M.Plunkett
- Polyscias verticillata B.C.Stone
- Polyscias vieillardii (Baill.) Lowry & G.M.Plunkett
- Polyscias vogelkopensis Philipson
- Polyscias waialealae (Rock) Lowry & G.M.Plunkett
- Polyscias waimeae (Wawra) Lowry & G.M.Plunkett
- Polyscias weinmanniae (Baill.) Harms
- Polyscias willmottii (F.Muell.) Philipson
- Polyscias winkleri (Harms) Frodin
- Polyscias wohlhauseri Lowry & Callm.
- Polyscias zanthoxyloides (Baker) Harms
- Polyscias zippeliana (Miq.) Valeton

In addition to the above, World Flora Online accepts the following:

- Polyscias racemosa (C.N.Forbes) Sherff
