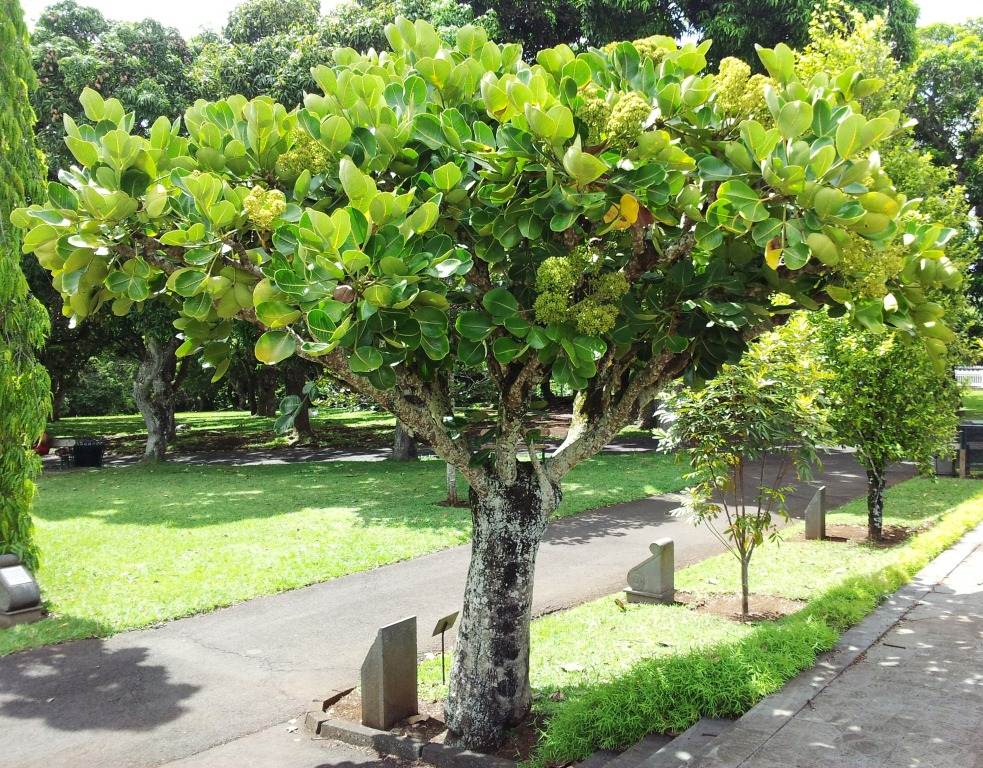
- At the Pamplemousses Botanical Garden, Mauritius

Conservation status
- Endangered (IUCN 2.3)

Scientific classification
- Kingdom: Plantae
- Clade: Tracheophytes
- Clade: Angiosperms
- Clade: Eudicots
- Clade: Asterids
- Order: Apiales
- Family: Araliaceae
- Genus: Polyscias
- Species: P. maraisiana

Binomial name
- Polyscias maraisiana Lowry & G.M.Plunkett

Synonyms
- Gastonia elegans (W.Bull) Frodin; Gastonia mauritiana Marais; Terminalia elegans W.Bull

= Polyscias maraisiana =

Species of flowering plant

Polyscias maraisiana is a species of plant in the family Araliaceae, formerly named Gastonia mauritiana.

It is endemic to Mauritius, where it was formerly common on forest verges and also in coastal areas. It was formerly grown as an ornamental in Europe, partly on account of its strikingly heteroblastic leaves, however it is rarely found in international cultivation now. It is however beginning to be cultivated in its native country, as an ornamental landscaping plant - for gardens and public areas. It is named for the botanist Wessel Marais.

It is one of several Polyscias species which are endemic to Mauritius, including Polyscias dichroostachya (distinctive flower-spike and large, square leaf-segments), Polyscias neraudiana (red flowers on spike, and smaller, longer leaf-segments), Polyscias gracilis, and Polyscias paniculata.

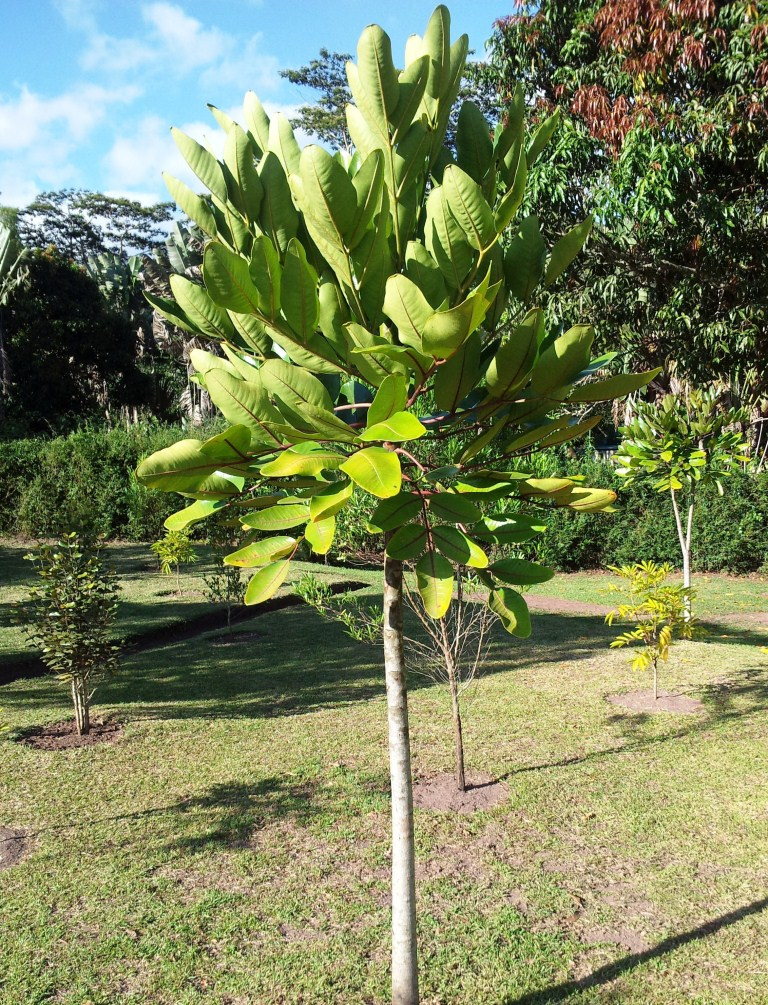
Young sapling

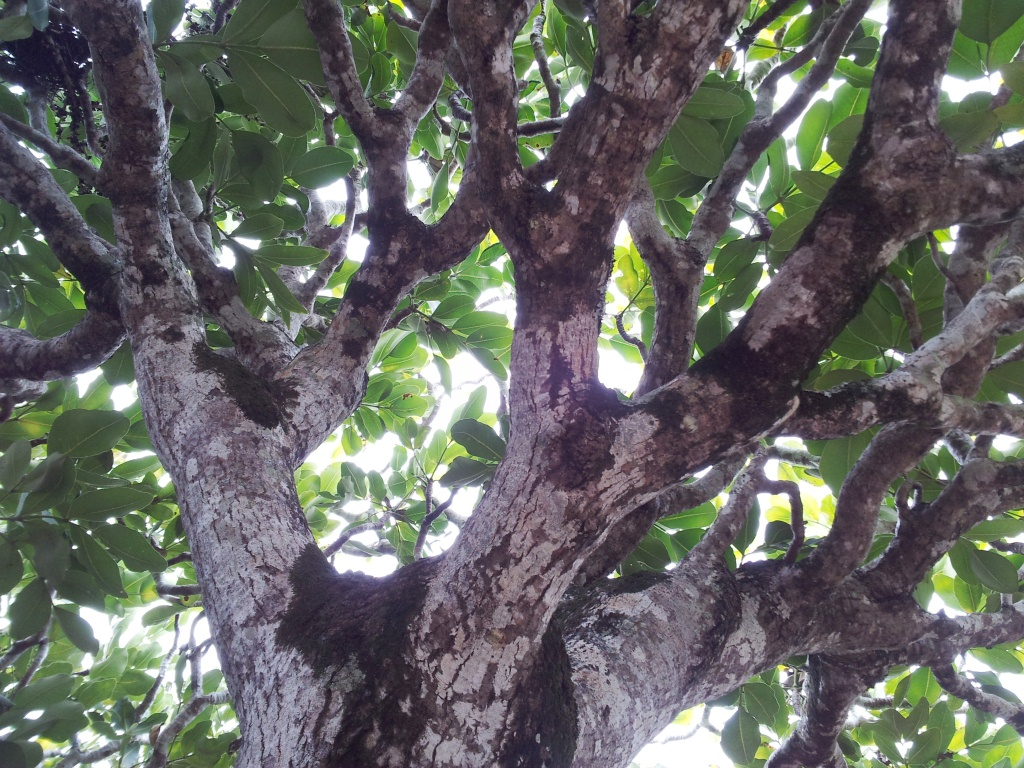
Canopy of a large specimen on Ile aux Aigrettes, Mauritius
