= Parasol tree =

Parasol tree is a common name for several plants and may refer to:

- Firmiana simplex, native to Asia, invasive in North America, also known as Chinese parasol tree
- Polyscias fulva, native to the Afrotropics
- Polyscias kikuyuensis, a threatened species endemic to Kenya
- Trochodendron aralioides, native to Japan, Korea and Taiwan, also known as Taiwanese parasol tree
