= Pencil cedar =

Pencil cedar may refer to any of several species of tree in the families Araliaceae and Cupressaceae:

- African pencil cedar - Juniperus procera CUPRESSACEAE
- Bermudan pencil cedar - Juniperus bermudiana CUPRESSACEAE
- Black pencil cedar - Polyscias elegans ARALIACEAE
- Pencil cedar - Polyscias murrayi ARALIACEAE
- Pencil cedar, Virginia pencil cedar - Juniperus virginiana CUPRESSACEAE
