= Bonnierella =

Bonnierella may refer to:

- Bonnierella (crustacean), a genus of crustaceans in the family Ischyroceridae
- Polyscias, for which Bonnierella is a synonym
