= Polyscias nothisii =

Conservation status
- Endangered (IUCN 3.1)

Scientific classification
- Kingdom: Plantae
- Clade: Tracheophytes
- Clade: Angiosperms
- Clade: Eudicots
- Clade: Asterids
- Order: Apiales
- Family: Araliaceae
- Genus: Polyscias
- Species: P. nothisii

Binomial name
- Polyscias nothisii Lowry ined.

Synonyms
- Tieghemopanax nothisii Lowry ined.

Species of flowering plant

Polyscias nothisii is a species of plant in the family Araliaceae for which no name has yet been published. It is endemic to New Caledonia. It is found in dry forest at low altitude on calcareous or volcano-sedimentary substrate. Main threats are habitat degradation caused by recurrent bushfires and invasive species (Rusa rusa deer (Rusa timorensis)) as well as land clearing. Its extent of occurrence (EOO) and area of occupancy (AOO) are estimated to be of 1,536 km^{2} and 44 km^{2} while the number of locations is estimated to be five. Polyscias nothisii is therefore assessed as Endangered (EN) with criteria B1ab(iii)+2ab(iii) with a continuing decline of habitat quality.
