= White basswood =

White basswood is a common name for several flowering plants and may refer to:

- Polyscias murrayi, native to eastern Australia
- Tilia heterophylla, native to eastern North America
