= Polyscias montana =

Conservation status
- Conservation Dependent (IUCN 2.3)

Scientific classification
- Kingdom: Plantae
- Clade: Tracheophytes
- Clade: Angiosperms
- Clade: Eudicots
- Clade: Asterids
- Order: Apiales
- Family: Araliaceae
- Genus: Polyscias
- Species: P. montana

Binomial name
- Polyscias montana (Ridl.) Lowry & G.M.Plunkett

Synonyms
- Arthrophyllum montanum Ridl.; Arthrophyllum nitidum Ridl.; Arthrophyllum ovatum Ridl.

Species of tree

Polyscias montana, synonym Arthrophyllum montanum, is a species of plant in the family Araliaceae. It is a shrub or tree endemic to Peninsular Malaysia. It is threatened by habitat loss.
