= Polyscias tahitensis =

Conservation status
- Endangered (IUCN 3.1)

Scientific classification
- Kingdom: Plantae
- Clade: Tracheophytes
- Clade: Angiosperms
- Clade: Eudicots
- Clade: Asterids
- Order: Apiales
- Family: Araliaceae
- Genus: Polyscias
- Species: P. tahitensis

Binomial name
- Polyscias tahitensis (Nadeaud) Harms (1894)

Synonyms
- Bonnierella reflexa (J.W.Moore) J.W.Moore (1934); Bonnierella tahitense (Nadeaud) R.Vig. (1905); Panax tahitensis Nadeaud (1873); Polyscias reflexa J.W.Moore (1933)

Species of flowering plant

Polyscias tahitensis is a species of flowering plant in the family Araliaceae. It is a shrub or tree endemic to the islands of Tahiti and Raiatea in the Society Islands of French Polynesia.
