= Polyscias prolifera =

Conservation status
- Vulnerable (IUCN 2.3)

Scientific classification
- Kingdom: Plantae
- Clade: Tracheophytes
- Clade: Angiosperms
- Clade: Eudicots
- Clade: Asterids
- Order: Apiales
- Family: Araliaceae
- Genus: Polyscias
- Species: P. prolifera

Binomial name
- Polyscias prolifera (Philipson) Lowry & G.M.Plunkett

Synonyms
- Arthrophyllum proliferum Philipson

Species of flowering plant

Polyscias prolifera, synonym Arthrophyllum proliferum, is a species of plant in the family Araliaceae. It is endemic to Papua New Guinea.
