= Polyscias zippeliana =

- Herbarium specimen

Conservation status
- Least Concern (NCA)

Scientific classification
- Kingdom: Plantae
- Clade: Tracheophytes
- Clade: Angiosperms
- Clade: Eudicots
- Clade: Asterids
- Order: Apiales
- Family: Araliaceae
- Genus: Polyscias
- Species: P. zippeliana

Binomial name
- Polyscias zippeliana (Miq.) Valeton

Synonyms
- Nothopanax zippelianus (Miq.) Seem.; Panax zippelianus Miq.; Kissodendron australianum var. dispermum F.Muell.; Kissodendron dispermum (F.Muell.) Domin; Polyscias australiana var. disperma (F.Muell.) Philipson; Polyscias caroli Harms; Polyscias disperma (F.Muell.) Lowry & G.M.Plunkett

Species of flowering plant

Polyscias zippeliana is a species of plant in the ivy family Araliaceae, native to the Northern Territory and Queensland in Australia, and to New Guinea. It is a small rainforest tree reaching up to 5 m (16 ft) in height. It was first described as Panax zippelianus in 1863, and transferred to Polyscias in 1907. It has been given a conservation status of least concern by the Queensland Government under its Nature Conservation Act..
