= Polyscias scopoliae =

Conservation status
- Vulnerable (IUCN 3.1)

Scientific classification
- Kingdom: Plantae
- Clade: Tracheophytes
- Clade: Angiosperms
- Clade: Eudicots
- Clade: Asterids
- Order: Apiales
- Family: Araliaceae
- Genus: Polyscias
- Species: P. scopoliae

Binomial name
- Polyscias scopoliae (Baill.) Lowry

Synonyms
- Pseudopanax scopoliae

Species of flowering plant

Polyscias scopoliae is a species of plant in the family Araliaceae. It is endemic to New Caledonia.
