= Polyscias quintasii =

Conservation status
- Endangered (IUCN 2.3)

Scientific classification
- Kingdom: Plantae
- Clade: Tracheophytes
- Clade: Angiosperms
- Clade: Eudicots
- Clade: Asterids
- Order: Apiales
- Family: Araliaceae
- Genus: Polyscias
- Species: P. quintasii

Binomial name
- Polyscias quintasii Exell

Species of flowering plant

Polyscias quintasii is a species of plant in the family Araliaceae. It is endemic to São Tomé and Príncipe. It was first described by Arthur Wallis Exell in 1944.
