= Polyscias farinosa =

Conservation status
- Near Threatened (IUCN 2.3)

Scientific classification
- Kingdom: Plantae
- Clade: Tracheophytes
- Clade: Angiosperms
- Clade: Eudicots
- Clade: Asterids
- Order: Apiales
- Family: Araliaceae
- Genus: Polyscias
- Species: P. farinosa

Binomial name
- Polyscias farinosa (Del.) Harms

Species of flowering plant

Polyscias farinosa is a species of plant in the family Araliaceae. It is endemic to Ethiopia.
