= Polyscias australiana =

Conservation status
- Least Concern (IUCN 3.1)

Scientific classification
- Kingdom: Plantae
- Clade: Tracheophytes
- Clade: Angiosperms
- Clade: Eudicots
- Clade: Asterids
- Order: Apiales
- Family: Araliaceae
- Genus: Polyscias
- Species: P. australiana

Binomial name
- Polyscias australiana (F.Muell.) Philipson

Species of flowering plant

Polyscias australiana, commonly known as ivory basswood, is a species of plant in the ivy family Araliaceae, native to northeast Queensland, Australia. It is a small rainforest tree reaching up to 15 m (49 ft) in height. It was first described as Hedera australiana in 1864, and transferred to Polyscias in 1978. It has been given a conservation status of least concern by the International Union for Conservation of Nature and by the Queensland Government under its Nature Conservation Act..
