= Polyscias macgillivrayi =

- Fruit

Conservation status
- Least Concern (IUCN 3.1)

Scientific classification
- Kingdom: Plantae
- Clade: Tracheophytes
- Clade: Angiosperms
- Clade: Eudicots
- Clade: Asterids
- Order: Apiales
- Family: Araliaceae
- Genus: Polyscias
- Species: P. macgillivrayi

Binomial name
- Polyscias macgillivrayi Harms

Species of flowering plant

Polyscias macgillivrayi is a species of plant in the ivy family Araliaceae, native to New Guinea, the Solomon Islands, Australia (northeast Queensland), and some islands of the western Pacific. It is a small rainforest tree reaching up to 5 m (16 ft) in height. It was first described as Panax macgillivrayi in 1867 and transferred to Polyscias in 1894. It has been given a conservation status of least concern by the International Union for Conservation of Nature and by the Queensland Government under its Nature Conservation Act..
