= Polyscias purpurea =

- Flowers and fruit

Conservation status
- Least Concern (IUCN 3.1)

Scientific classification
- Kingdom: Plantae
- Clade: Tracheophytes
- Clade: Angiosperms
- Clade: Eudicots
- Clade: Asterids
- Order: Apiales
- Family: Araliaceae
- Genus: Polyscias
- Species: P. purpurea

Binomial name
- Polyscias purpurea C.T.White

Species of flowering plant

Polyscias purpurea is a species of plant in the ivy family Araliaceae, native to northeast Queensland, Australia. It is a small rainforest tree reaching up to 5 m (16 ft) in height. It was first described by botanist Cyril Tenison White in 1935, and published in Proceedings of the Royal Society of Queensland in 1936. It has been given a conservation status of least concern by the International Union for Conservation of Nature and by the Queensland Government under its Nature Conservation Act..
