= Polyscias mauritiana =

Conservation status
- Endangered (IUCN 2.3)

Scientific classification
- Kingdom: Plantae
- Clade: Tracheophytes
- Clade: Angiosperms
- Clade: Eudicots
- Clade: Asterids
- Order: Apiales
- Family: Araliaceae
- Genus: Polyscias
- Species: P. mauritiana

Binomial name
- Polyscias mauritiana Marais

Species of flowering plant

Polyscias mauritiana is a species of flowering plant in the family Araliaceae. It is endemic to Mauritius.
