= Polyscias willmottii =

- Herbarium specimen

Conservation status
- Least Concern (NCA)

Scientific classification
- Kingdom: Plantae
- Clade: Tracheophytes
- Clade: Angiosperms
- Clade: Eudicots
- Clade: Asterids
- Order: Apiales
- Family: Araliaceae
- Genus: Polyscias
- Species: P. willmottii

Binomial name
- Polyscias willmottii (F.Muell.) Philipson

Synonyms
- Pentapanax willmottii F.Muell.

Species of flowering plant

Polyscias willmottii is a species of plant in the ivy family Araliaceae, native to northeast Queensland, Australia. It is a small rainforest tree reaching up to 8 m (26 ft) in height. It was first described as Pentapanax willmottii in 1887, and transferred to Polyscias in 1977. It has been given a conservation status of least concern by the Queensland Government under its Nature Conservation Act..
