= Polyscias mollis =

- Tree with flower buds in rainforest near Cairns, Queensland

Conservation status
- Least Concern (IUCN 3.1)

Scientific classification
- Kingdom: Plantae
- Clade: Tracheophytes
- Clade: Angiosperms
- Clade: Eudicots
- Clade: Asterids
- Order: Apiales
- Family: Araliaceae
- Genus: Polyscias
- Species: P. mollis

Binomial name
- Polyscias mollis (Benth.) Harms

Synonyms
- Panax mollis Benth.; Tieghemopanax mollis (Benth.) R.Vig.; Aralia macdowallii (F.Muell.) F.M.Bailey; Nothopanax molle Seem.; Panax macdowallii F.Muell.; Polyscias macdowallii (F.Muell.) Domin

Species of flowering plant

Polyscias mollis is a species of plant in the ivy family Araliaceae, native to northeast Queensland, Australia. It is a small rainforest tree reaching up to 8 m (26 ft) in height. It was first described, as Panax mollis, in 1867 and transferred to Polyscias in 1894. It has been given a conservation status of least concern by the International Union for Conservation of Nature and by the Queensland Government under its Nature Conservation Act..
