= Polyscias pulgarensis =

Conservation status
- Endangered (IUCN 3.1)

Scientific classification
- Kingdom: Plantae
- Clade: Tracheophytes
- Clade: Angiosperms
- Clade: Eudicots
- Clade: Asterids
- Order: Apiales
- Family: Araliaceae
- Genus: Polyscias
- Species: P. pulgarensis

Binomial name
- Polyscias pulgarensis (Elmer) Lowry & G.M.Plunkett

Synonyms
- Arthrophyllum pulgarense Elmer

Species of flowering plant

Polyscias pulgarensis, synonym Arthrophyllum pulgarense, is a species of plant in the family Araliaceae. It is endemic to the Philippines.
