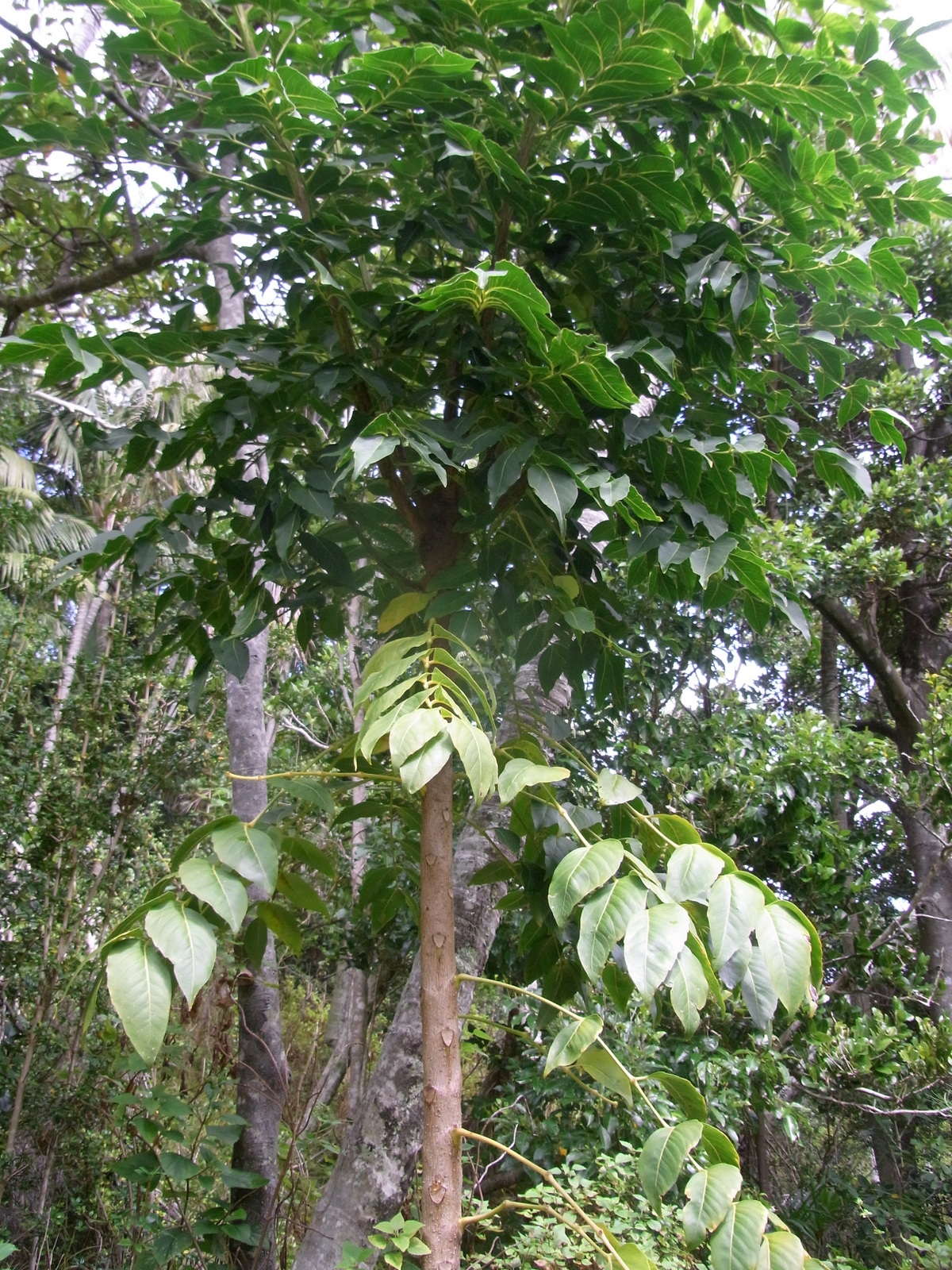

Scientific classification
- Kingdom: Plantae
- Clade: Tracheophytes
- Clade: Angiosperms
- Clade: Eudicots
- Clade: Asterids
- Order: Apiales
- Family: Araliaceae
- Genus: Polyscias
- Species: P. cissodendron

Binomial name
- Polyscias cissodendron (C.Moore & F.Muell.) Harms

= Polyscias cissodendron =

Species of tree

Polyscias cissodendron, commonly known as the island pine, is a species of tree in the family Araliaceae. It is native to New Caledonia and Vanuatu in Melanesia, as well as to Australia’s subtropical Lord Howe Island in the Tasman Sea. The specific epithet is derived from the Greek kissos (“ivy”) and dendron (“tree”). On Lord Howe it occurs in sheltered lowland forest.

== Description ==
The tree grows to 12 m, sometimes more, in height. Its imparipinnate leaves are 10–35 cm long. It flowers from mid September to late November; producing paniculate, terminal inflorescences of small yellow flowers. The purple-maroon fruits are bluntly ribbed, laterally compressed and spheroidal, 3.5–4.5 mm long.
