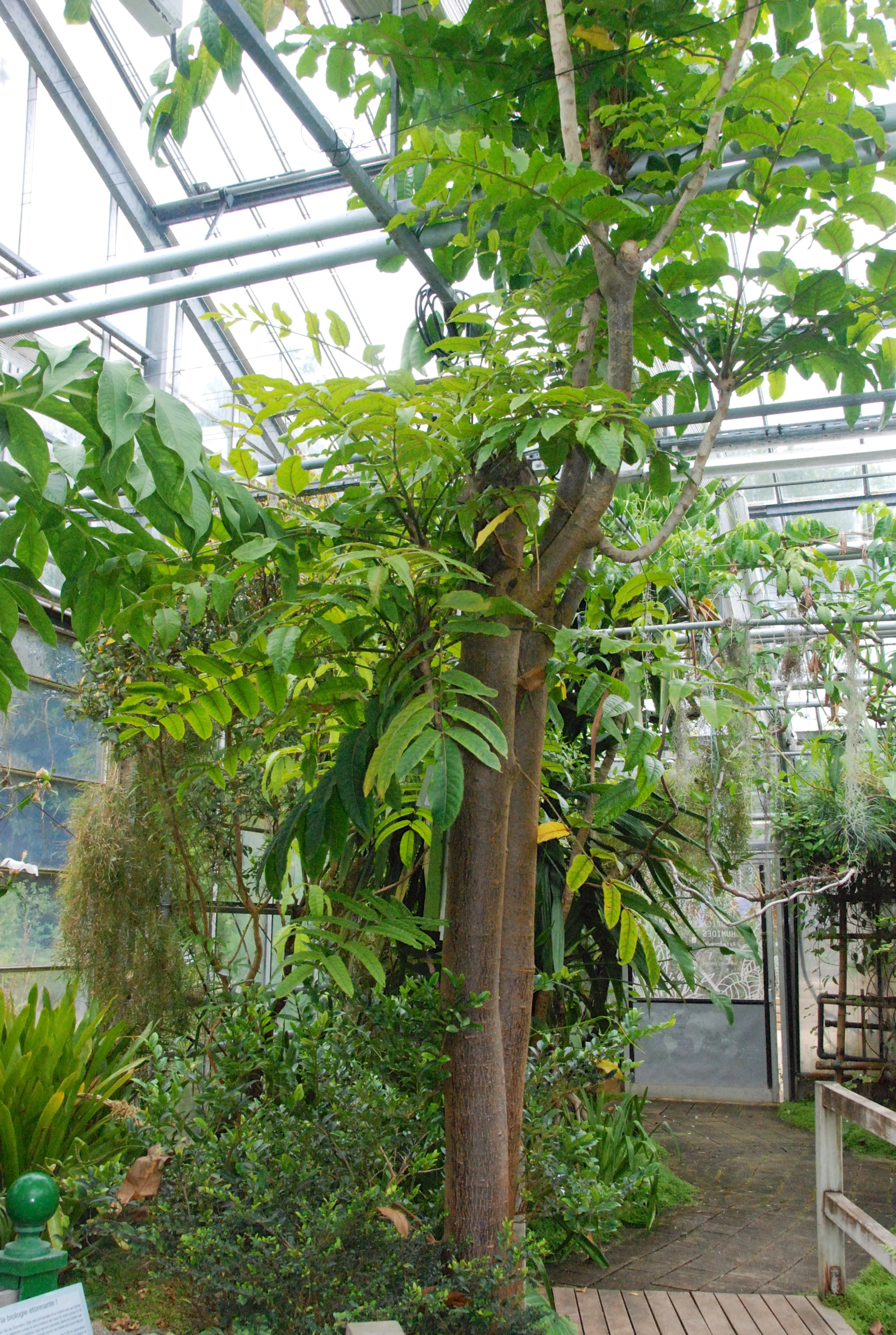

Conservation status
- Critically Endangered (IUCN 2.3)

Scientific classification
- Kingdom: Plantae
- Clade: Tracheophytes
- Clade: Angiosperms
- Clade: Eudicots
- Clade: Asterids
- Order: Apiales
- Family: Araliaceae
- Genus: Polyscias
- Species: P. aemiliguineae

Binomial name
- Polyscias aemiliguineae Bernardi

= Polyscias aemiliguineae =

Species of shrub

Polyscias aemiliguineae is a species of plant in the family Araliaceae. It is endemic to Réunion.

It is a shrub or tree, evergreen, hermaphroditic, andromonoecious or dioecious, unarmed, often glabrous, some with sharply aromatic herbage . Leaves 1-5-pinnately compound, margins entire to crenate or serrate; stipules sometimes intrapetiolar and adnate to inside of petiole or absent. Inflorescence a terminal panicle of umbels, heads or spikes, sometimes with a terminal umbel of bisexual flowers and 1 to several lateral umbels of male flowers. Pedicel articulate below ovary. Calyx undulate or with 4 or 5(-8 or more) small lobes . Petals 4 or 5(-8 or more), valvate . Stamens as many as petals. Ovary 4 or 5(-8 or more) carpellate; styles free or rarely connate at base . Fruit a drupe, terete or laterally flattened. Seeds compressed, endosperm smooth .
