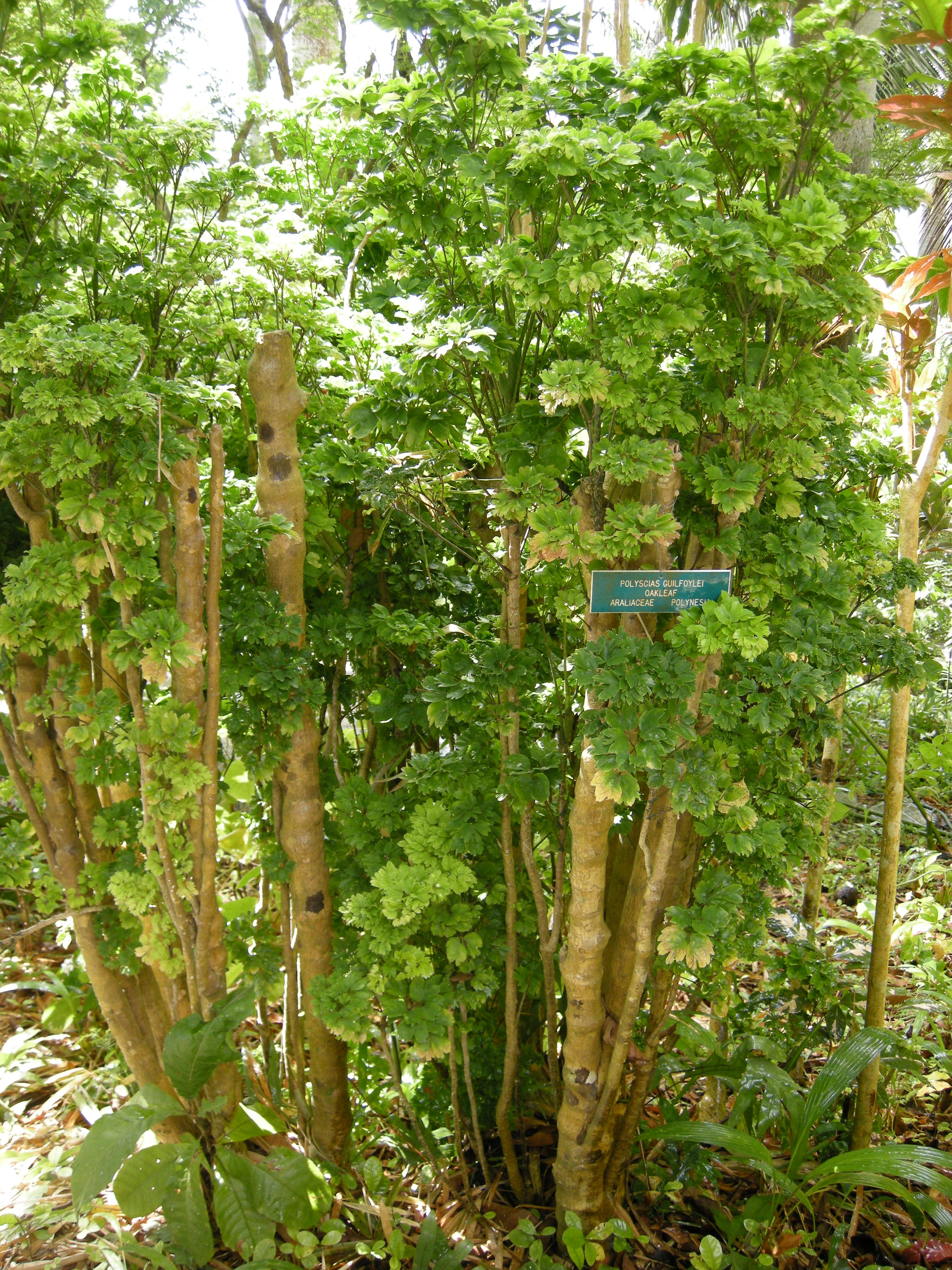
- Polyscias guilfoylei at Andromeda Botanic Gardens, Barbados

Scientific classification
- Kingdom: Plantae
- Clade: Tracheophytes
- Clade: Angiosperms
- Clade: Eudicots
- Clade: Asterids
- Order: Apiales
- Family: Araliaceae
- Genus: Polyscias
- Species: P. guilfoylei

Binomial name
- Polyscias guilfoylei (W.Bull) L.H. Bailey

= Polyscias guilfoylei =

Species of shrub

Polyscias guilfoylei, the geranium aralia or wild coffee, is a species of evergreen shrub native to the paleotropics and neotropics. It is not closely related to the true coffee plants of the genus Coffea. It has erect branches and can grow to a height of up to 24 ft (7.3 m). The leaves are long and 1-pinnate with leaflets which are opposite. The leaf blades are variable, but usually ovate or elliptic and coarsely dentate or lacerate. The leaves are commonly variegated with margins of white or pale yellow, but can also be entirely dark green.

The insignificant flowers form as green umbels, and may be followed by black berries.

The cultivar 'Victoriae', with strongly variegated, white and green, jagged leaves, is a recipient of the Royal Horticultural Society's Award of Garden Merit. It does not tolerate temperatures below 15 °C (59 °F), and must be grown under glass all year round in temperate zones.

== Gallery ==
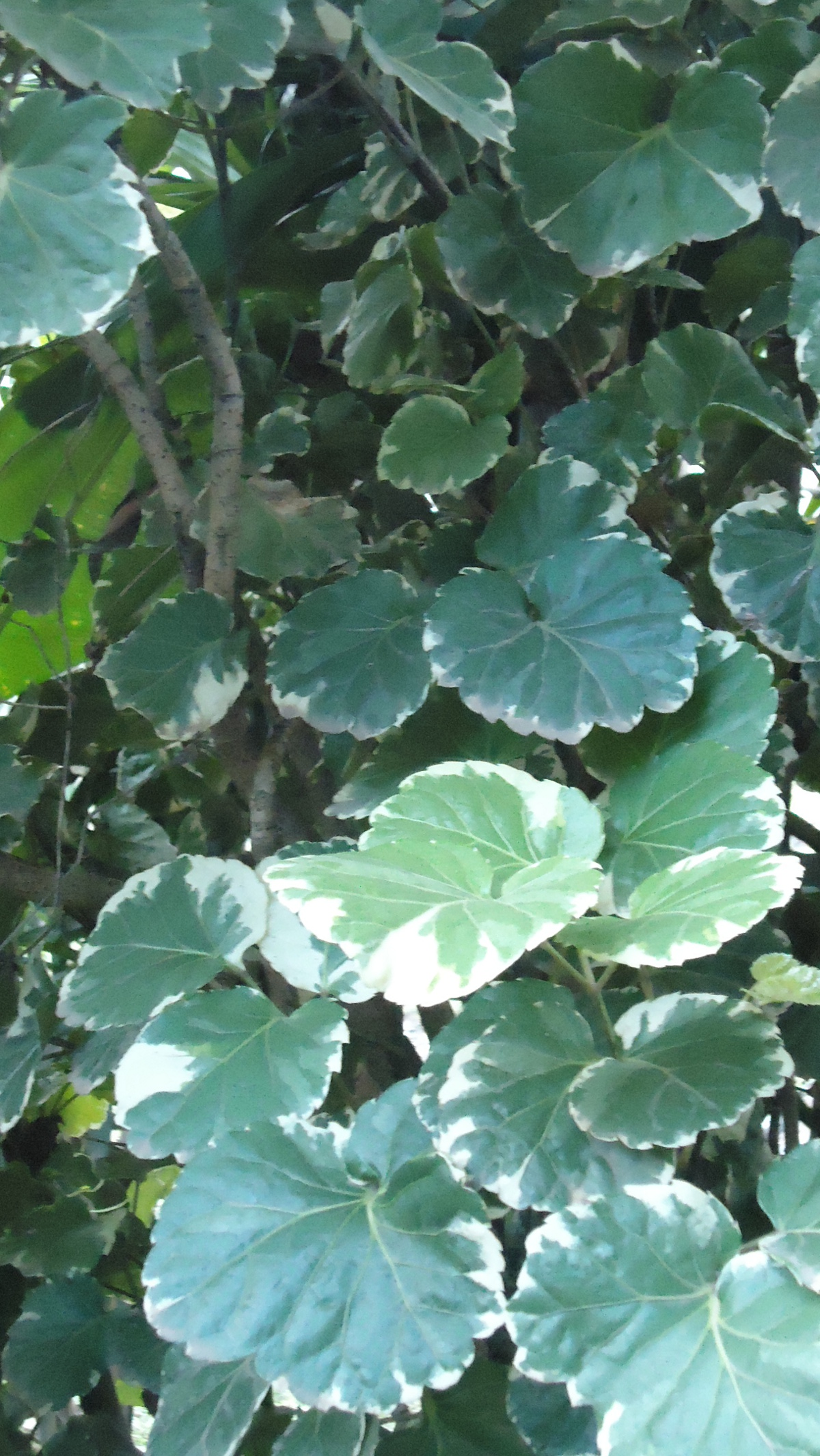

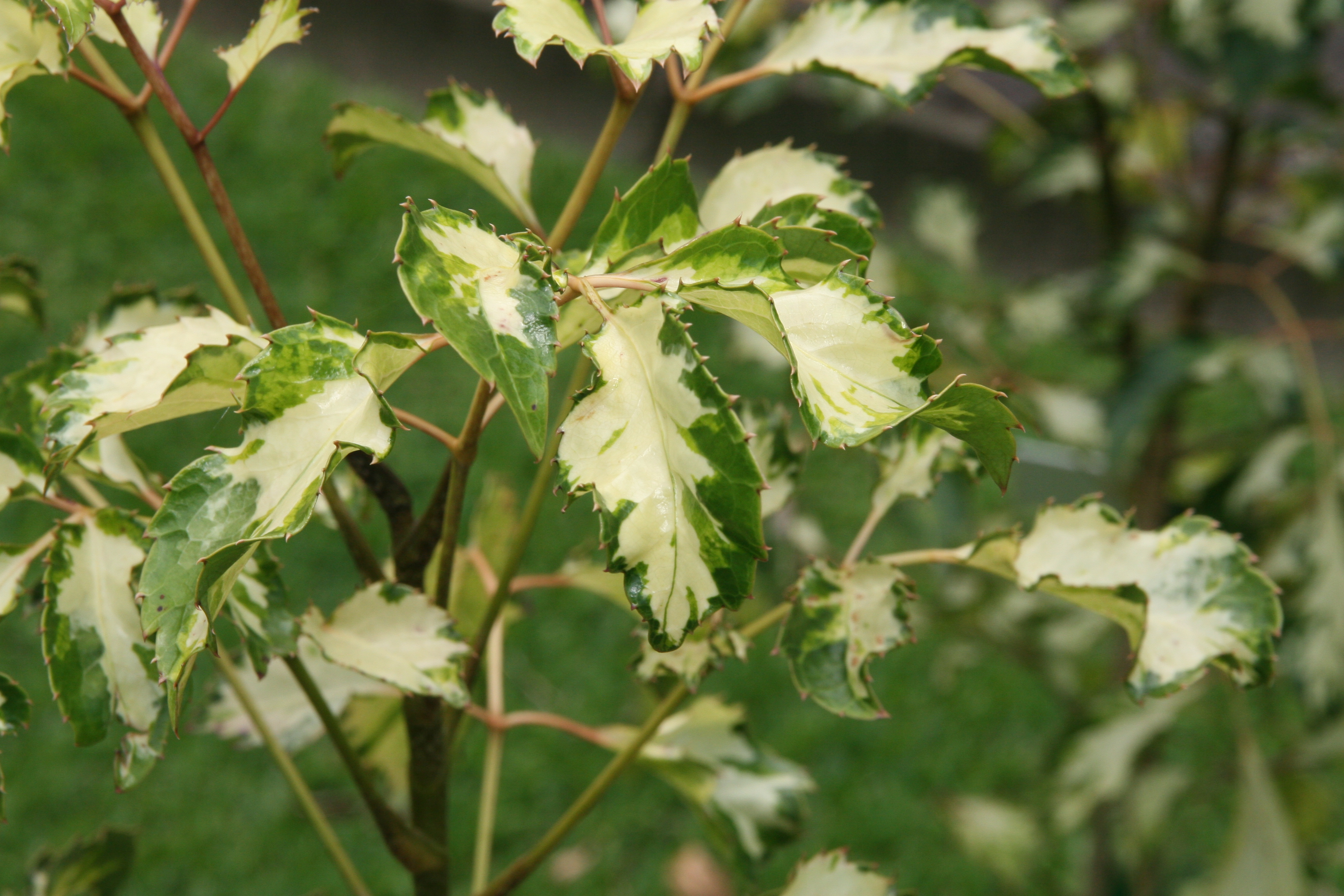

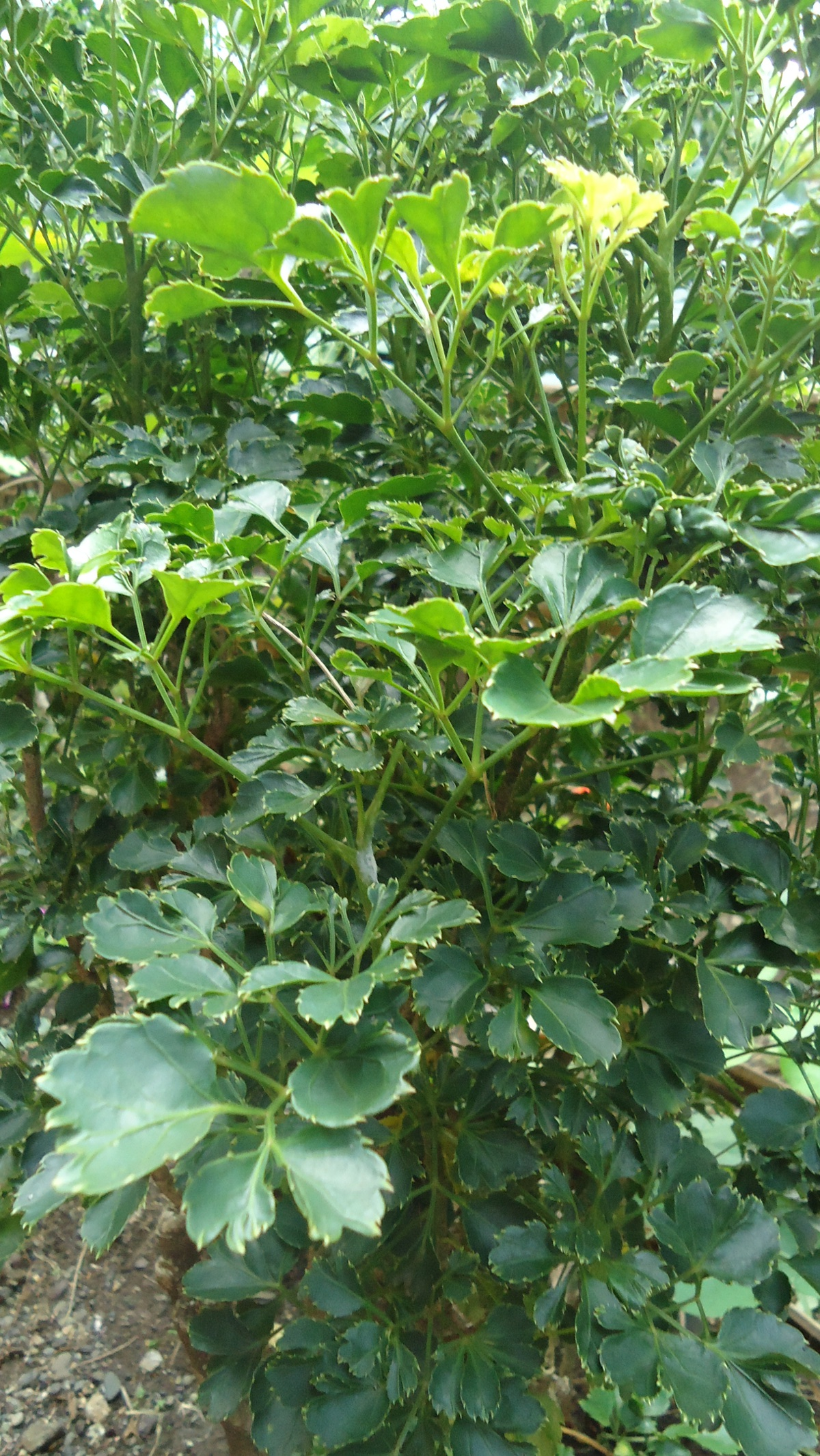
