= Polyscias gracilis =

Conservation status
- Critically Endangered (IUCN 2.3)

Scientific classification
- Kingdom: Plantae
- Clade: Tracheophytes
- Clade: Angiosperms
- Clade: Eudicots
- Clade: Asterids
- Order: Apiales
- Family: Araliaceae
- Genus: Polyscias
- Species: P. gracilis

Binomial name
- Polyscias gracilis Marais

Species of flowering plant

Polyscias gracilis is a species of flowering plant in the family Araliaceae. It is sometimes referred to by the common name bois papaye, It is endemic to Mauritius.
