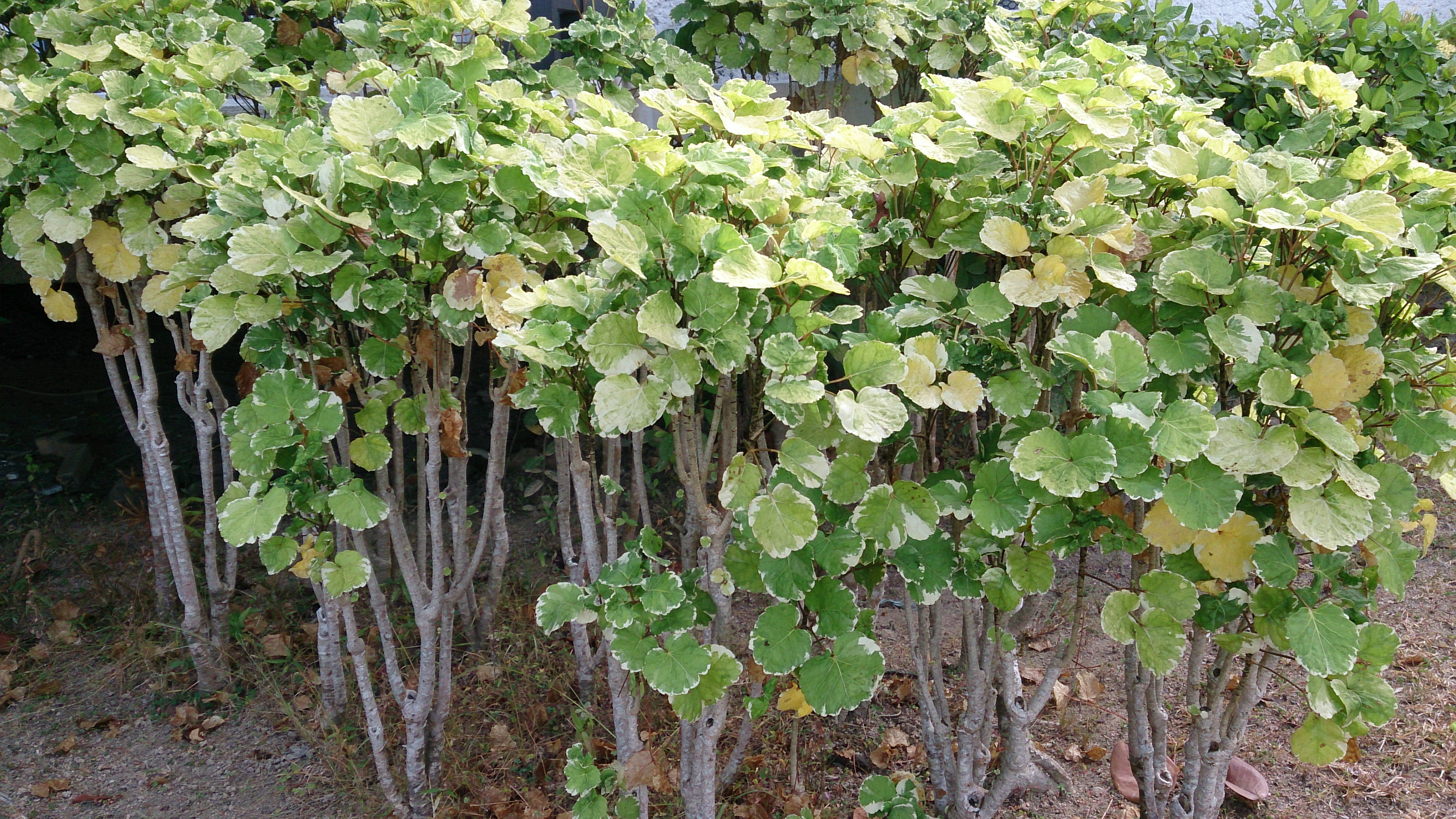

Scientific classification
- Kingdom: Plantae
- Clade: Tracheophytes
- Clade: Angiosperms
- Clade: Eudicots
- Clade: Asterids
- Order: Apiales
- Family: Araliaceae
- Genus: Polyscias
- Species: P. balfouriana

Binomial name
- Polyscias balfouriana (André) L.H.Bailey

Synonyms
- Aralia balfouriana André; Panax balfourii Pynaert; Panax balfourii Pynaert ex Sander

= Polyscias balfouriana =

Species of flowering plant

Polyscias balfouriana, known as Balfour aralia or dinner plate aralia, is a species in the family Araliaceae. The species is native from New Guinea to Queensland, Australia.

It is a bushy shrub. Leaves are alternate and have long petioles. Flowers are white with 5 petals.

The specific epithet honors John Hutton Balfour. The species is often grown in cultivation as an ornamental.
