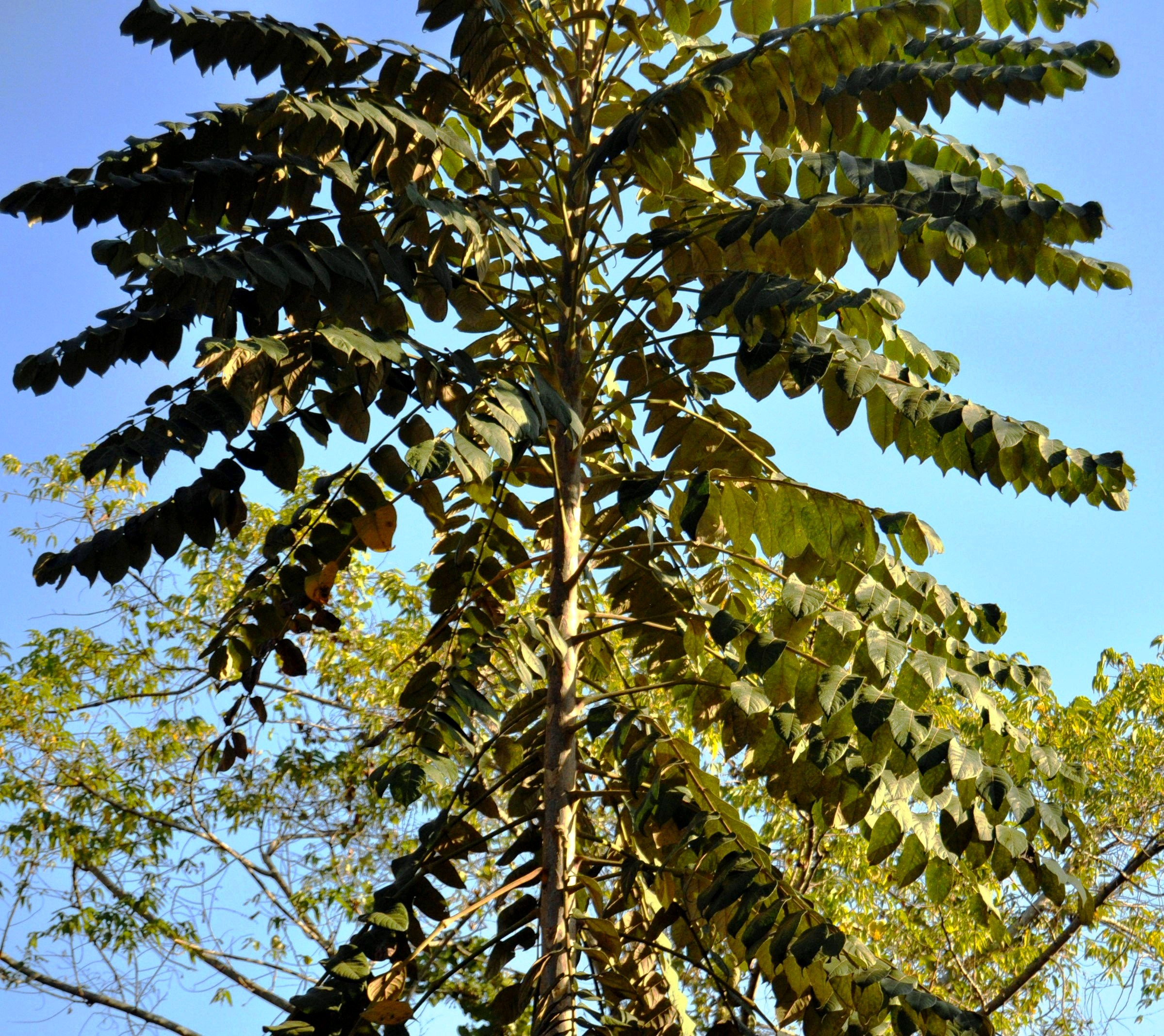
- P. fulva at the Lowveld National Botanical Garden in South Africa

Conservation status
- Least Concern (IUCN 3.1)

Scientific classification
- Kingdom: Plantae
- Clade: Tracheophytes
- Clade: Angiosperms
- Clade: Eudicots
- Clade: Asterids
- Order: Apiales
- Family: Araliaceae
- Genus: Polyscias
- Species: P. fulva

Binomial name
- Polyscias fulva (Hiern) Harms

Synonyms
- Botryopanax fulvus (Hiern) Hutch.; Panax ferrugineus Hiern; Panax fulvus Hiern; Panax nigericus A.Chev.; Polyscias elliotii Harms; Polyscias ferruginea (Hiern) Harms; Polyscias malosana Harms; Polyscias polybotrya Harms; Polyscias preussii Harms; Sciadopanax elliotii (Harms) R.Vig.; Sciadopanax ferrugineus (Hiern) R.Vig.; Sciadopanax fulvus (Hiern) R.Vig.; Sciadopanax malosanus (Harms) R.Vig.; Sciadopanax polybotrya (Harms) R.Vig.; Sciadopanax preussii (Harms) R.Vig.

= Polyscias fulva =

Parasol tree

Species of tree

Polyscias fulva is a species of flowering plant in the family Araliaceae (ginseng). It is an evergreen or deciduous tree, native to the mountains of tropical Africa and the southwestern Arabian Peninsula.

== Description ==
Polyscias fulva is a deciduous or evergreen tree, with a straight trunk and a small umbrella-shaped crown. It can grow to 25 to 30 m (82 to 98 ft) in height. It has a straight trunk, which is unbranched for most of its height. The trunk is unbutressed, and can grow up to 100 cm (39 in) in diameter.

The foliage is composed of large compound leaves, which grow in bunches at the top of the branches. The leaflets are dark green on the top, and white and tomentose on the underside. It is similar in form and foliage to Polyscias kikuyuensis, but is distinguished by its flowers.

The tree is typically fast-growing. In plantations in Cameroon, seedings can grow to 2–3 m (6 ft 7 in – 9 ft 10 in) in height within four years, and within 20 years can grow up to 15 m (49 ft) high with a trunk diameter of 20 to 40 cm (7.9 to 15.7 in).

== Habitat and range ==
Polysicas fulva is generally found in mountain forests, from 750 to 2,500 m (2,460 to 8,200 ft) elevation. It grows best where the average daytime temperature ranges from 20 to 30 °C (68 to 86 °F) and average annual rainfall is from 1,500 to 2,000 mm (59 to 79 in), but it can tolerate average daytime temperatures of 18 to 36 °C (64 to 97 °F), and average annual rainfall of 1,200 to 2,500 mm (47 to 98 in). It prefers well-drained sandy to loamy soil, with a pH ranging from 5 to 6.5, and can tolerate a pH of 4.5 to 7.

It is found in montane rain forests, submontane forests, riverine forests, and mountain grasslands. It is a pioneer tree which grows rapidly in areas which have been cleared or burned, although it is sensitive to fire.

It ranges across much of tropical Africa. It is found in Guinea, Sierra Leone, and Liberia in West Africa, and across Subsaharan Africa from Ghana eastwards to Ethiopia, and southwards to Mozambique, Zimbabwe, and Angola. It is also found on the southwestern Arabian Peninsula in Yemen.

== Uses ==
The wood is lightweight and easily worked, but brittle and not durable. It is used in household objects and handicrafts, and for firewood.

The tree's fast-growing habit makes it a useful tree in reforestation projects. It forms a rich leaf mulch on the ground below which improves soil. Its tall crown makes it useful in crop plantations which prefer light shade, including coffee, cocoa, and bananas, and it is often left uncut when forest areas are cleared for cultivation.

The flowers are a good source of nectar and pollen for honeybees.

== Conservation ==
The tree is widespread in suitable mountain habitats across Africa, and is assessed as 'Least Concern' in the IUCN Red List. The tree is becoming locally scarce in parts of its range where deforestation and fire are rampant.
