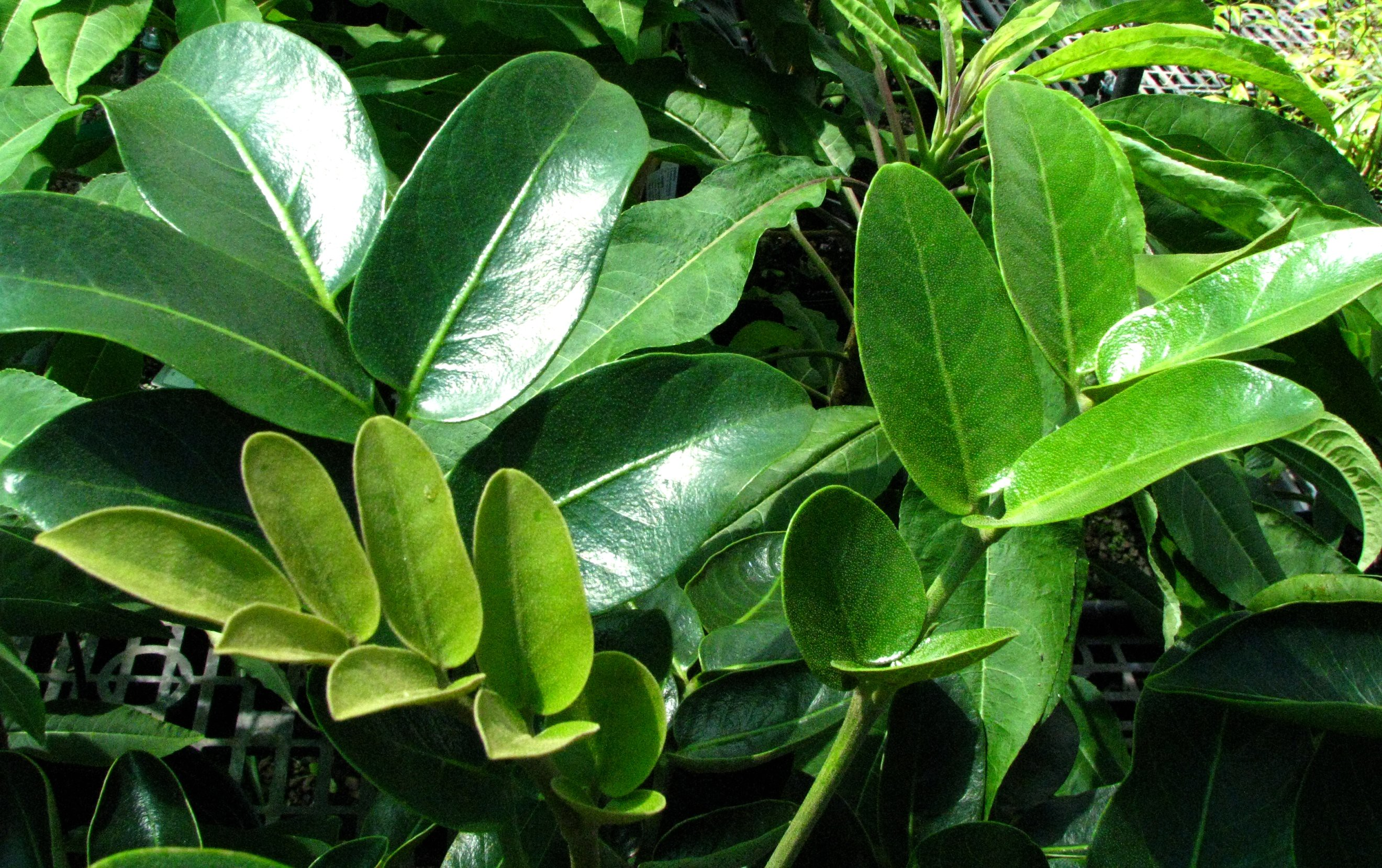

Scientific classification
- Kingdom: Plantae
- Clade: Tracheophytes
- Clade: Angiosperms
- Clade: Eudicots
- Clade: Asterids
- Order: Apiales
- Family: Araliaceae
- Genus: Polyscias
- Species: P. flynnii

Binomial name
- Polyscias flynnii (Lowry & K.R. Wood) Lowry & G. M. Plunkett

Synonyms
- Tetraplasandra flynnii Lowry & K.R. Wood

= Polyscias flynnii =

Species of flowering plant

Polyscias flynnii (known by the common names Flynn's ʻOhe and ʻOheʻohe) is a plant species endemic to the island of Kauai in Hawaii. It is rare, found only in one population covering about 1 km^{2} in the Kalalau Valley. It is regarded as threatened. It is threatened by feral goats and non-native plant species in its habitat. It was federally listed as an endangered species of the United States in 2010.

This plant was first discovered in 1988 and described to science as a new species in 2000. There are only five individuals known to exist.

Polyscias flynnii is a tree up to 9 m tall. Leaves are pinnately compound, up to 60 cm long, with reddish-brown hairs on the underside but not on the upper side. Inflorescence is a panicle or umbel hanging from the axils of the leaves, with 10-15 flowers. Flowers are yellow-green, some hermaphroditic (both male and female) but others on the same plant staminate (male only).
