= Polyscias dichroostachya =

Conservation status
- Endangered (IUCN 2.3)

Scientific classification
- Kingdom: Plantae
- Clade: Tracheophytes
- Clade: Angiosperms
- Clade: Eudicots
- Clade: Asterids
- Order: Apiales
- Family: Araliaceae
- Genus: Polyscias
- Species: P. dichroostachya

Binomial name
- Polyscias dichroostachya Baker

Species of flowering plant

Polyscias dichroostachya, commonly called bois d'eponge, is a species of plant in the family Araliaceae. It is endemic to Mauritius, where it used to be common in the forests of the south-west of the island.

It can be distinguished from the other Polyscias by its distinctive flower-spike and its more large, square leaf-segments of its compound leaves.
