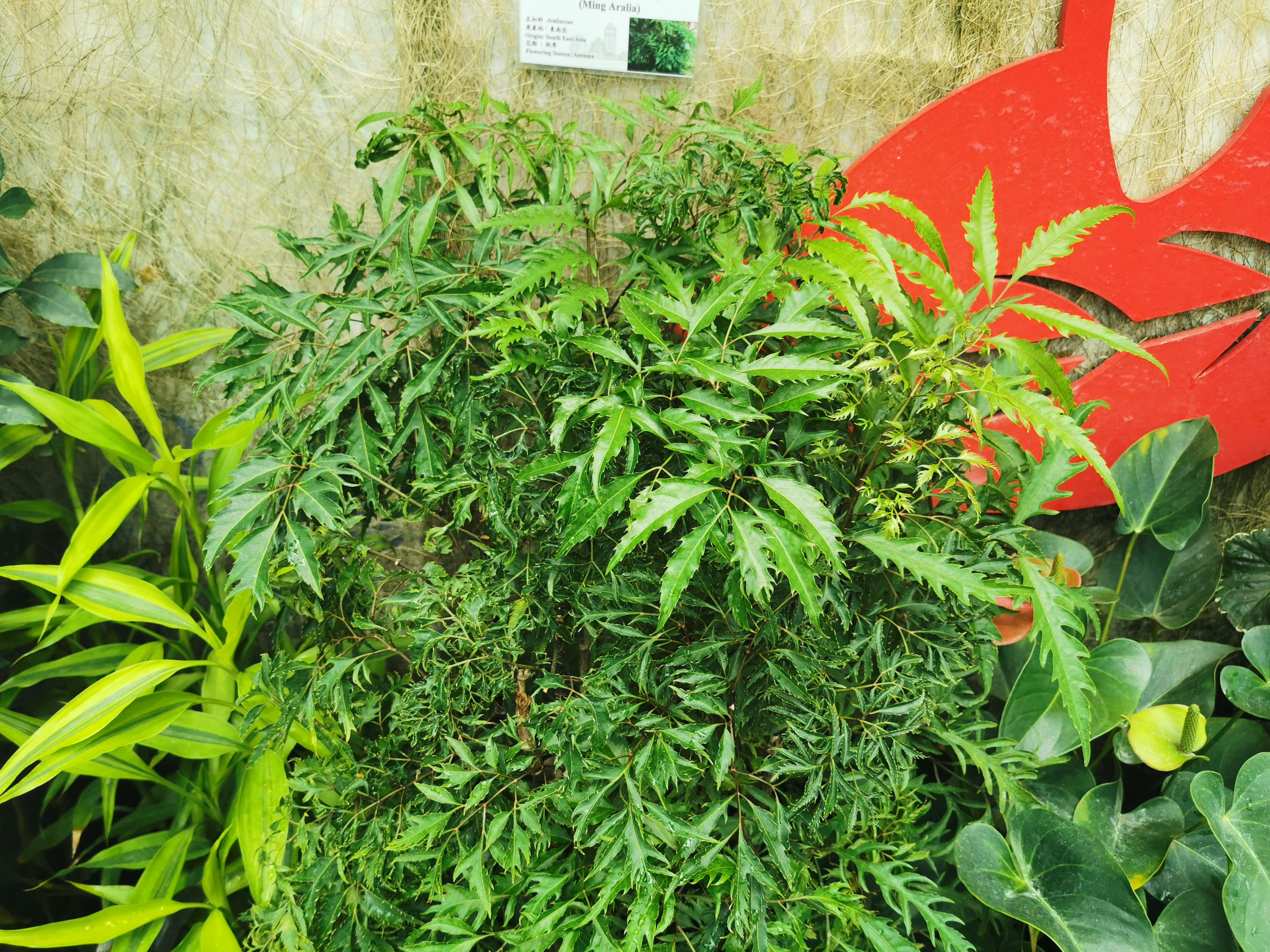

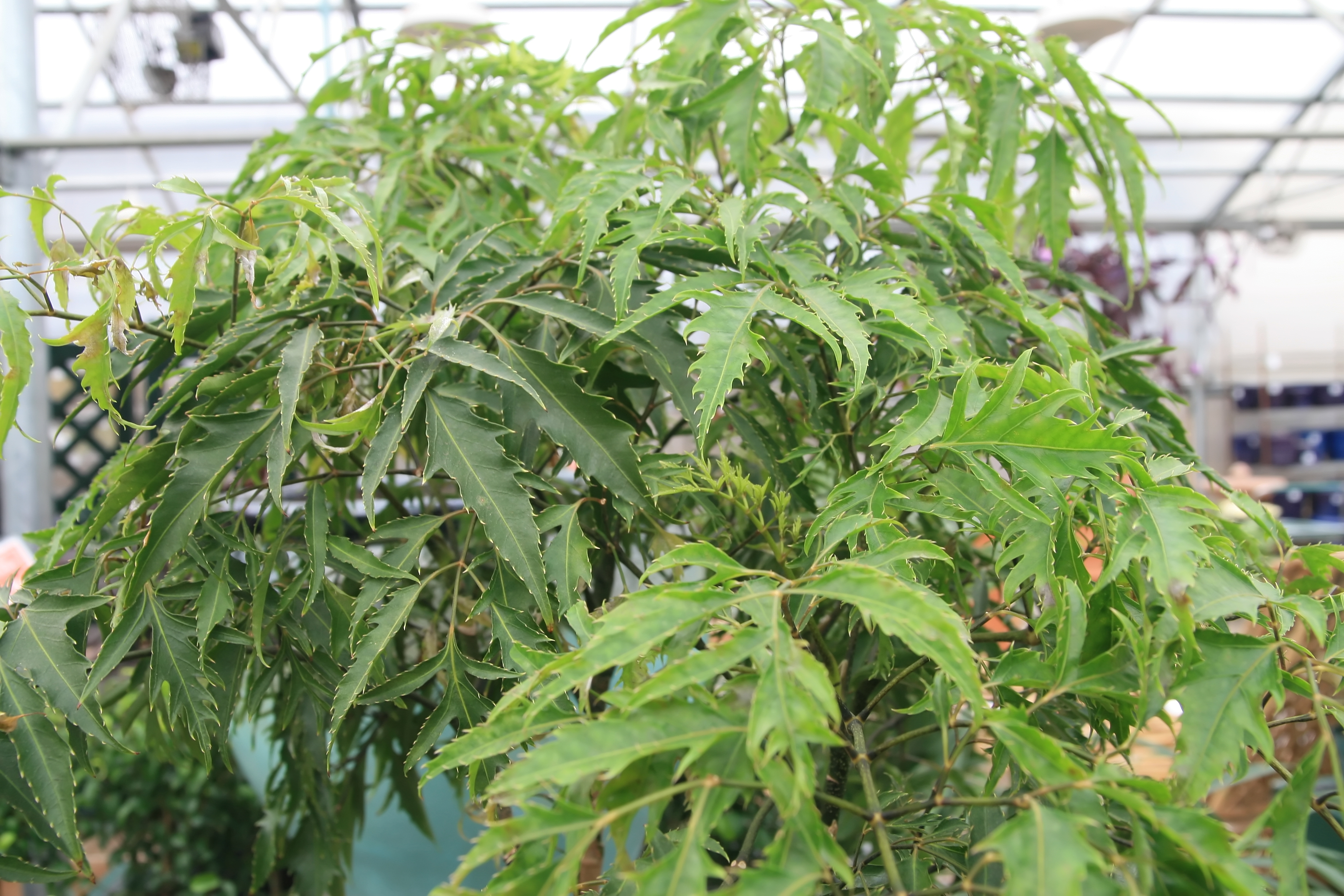

Scientific classification
- Kingdom: Plantae
- Clade: Tracheophytes
- Clade: Angiosperms
- Clade: Eudicots
- Clade: Asterids
- Order: Apiales
- Family: Araliaceae
- Genus: Polyscias
- Species: P. fruticosa

Binomial name
- Polyscias fruticosa (L.) Harms

Synonyms
- Panax fruticosus L.; Nothopanax fruticosus (L.) Miq.; Tieghemopanax fruticosus (L.) R.Vig.; Aralia fruticosa (L.) L.H.Bailey

= Polyscias fruticosa =

Species of shrub

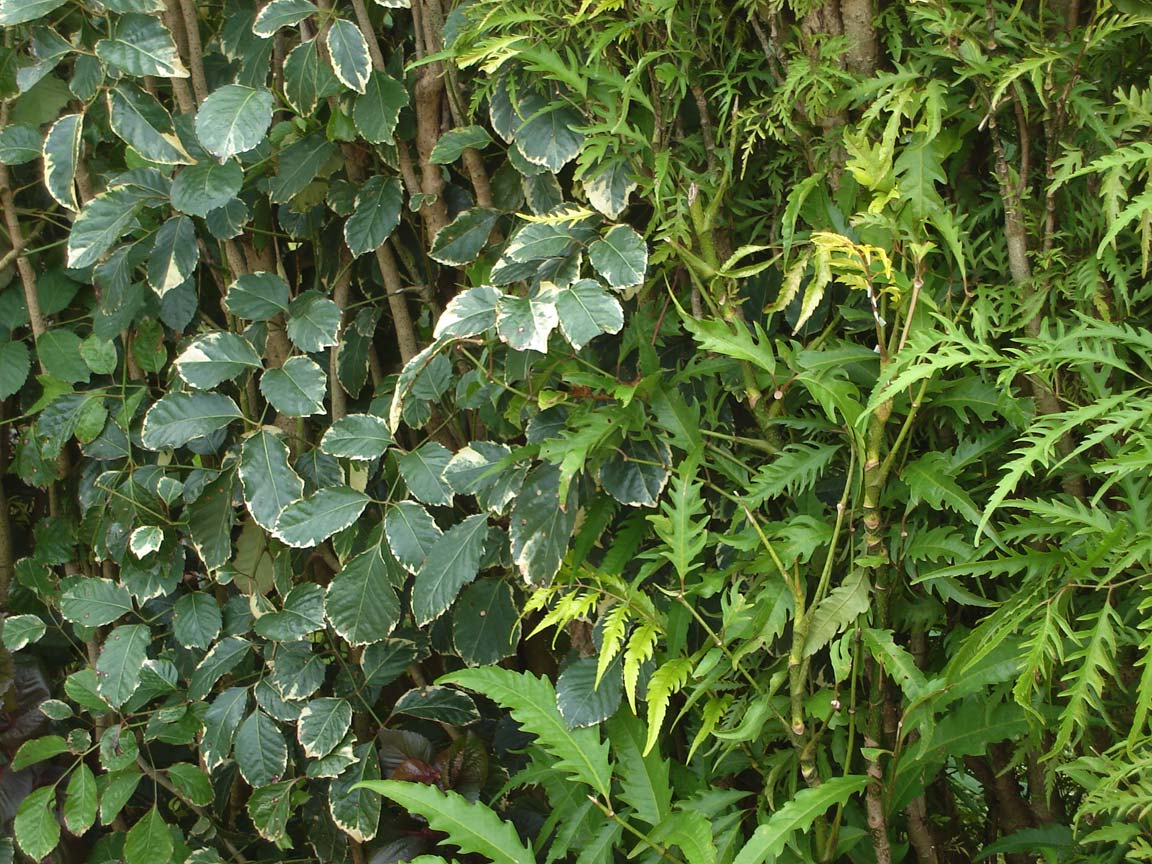
Polyscias guilfoylei and Polyscias fruticosa

Polyscias fruticosa, or Ming aralia, is a perennial dicot evergreen shrub or dwarf tree in the ivy family Araliaceae, found in tropical and subtropical regions. The plant grows fairly slowly, up to 3–5 metres (9.8–16.4 ft) in height. The leaves are tripinnate, with a glossy surface. Ming aralia is commonly grown as an ornamental and a potherb, valued for its culinary and medicinal uses.

== Description ==
Ming aralia exhibits a fruticose or shrubby growth habit with upright branches, hence its species name, fruticosa.

The compound leaves consist of many leaflets that are finely divided themselves, giving the plant its distinctive appearance. The leaflets are glossy dark green on the upper surface and lighter beneath, hence the genus name Polyscias, which means "many-shaded", a common feature of the foliage of other plants in this genus. The overall leaf form is tripinnate, sometimes up to five-pinnate. Individual leaflets vary from narrowly ovate to lanceolate and are about 10 centimetres (3.9 in) long, with serrated or lobed margins.

The leaves have an alternate arrangement, borne on slender, slightly woody stalks that measure 5–15 centimetres (2.0–5.9 in) long. The petioles carry compound leaves with up to seven or more opposite leaflets, arranged along a central stalk (rachis). On some specimens, the petioles, rachises, and petiolules have a reddish hue. In optimal conditions, the foliage is dense and finely divided, making Ming aralia popular as an ornamental houseplant or hedge.

The flowers are small, inconspicuous, and pale yellow to white, typically borne in terminal or axillary umbels or panicles above or among the foliage. Each flower has five tiny petals and is actinomorphic, characteristic of the Araliaceae family. Small insects, particularly bees and flies, are the main pollinators. Flowering usually occurs during the warm, humid months in tropical regions.

Following pollination, the plant produces small spherical to ovate drupes, about 3–5 millimetres (0.12–0.20 in) in diameter, ripening from green to purplish-black or dark brown. Each fruit typically contains one or two seeds dispersed by birds. In cultivated settings, Ming aralia is usually propagated by stem cuttings, as its seeds have low germination rates.

== Distribution ==
Ming aralia grows primarily in the wet tropical biome, native to the Sulawesi and Maluku Islands of Indonesia, New Guinea, and northeastern Australia. It has been introduced to Bangladesh, Malaysia, Myanmar, Thailand, Vietnam, Tonga, the Caribbean, Ghana, and Mozambique.

== Uses ==
The young leaves are eaten raw in Southeast Asia with meat dishes, or simply dipped in a spicy sauce like nam phrik or sambal. It is known as lep khrut (Thai: เล็บครุฑ) in Thailand, kuku garuda (lit. "Garuda claws") in Malaysia and Indonesia, and đinh lăng in Vietnam. The leaves are also boiled in soups, stir-fried, added to curries, or beaten with eggs to make omelets. The taste and texture of the leaves have been likened to celery and parsley.

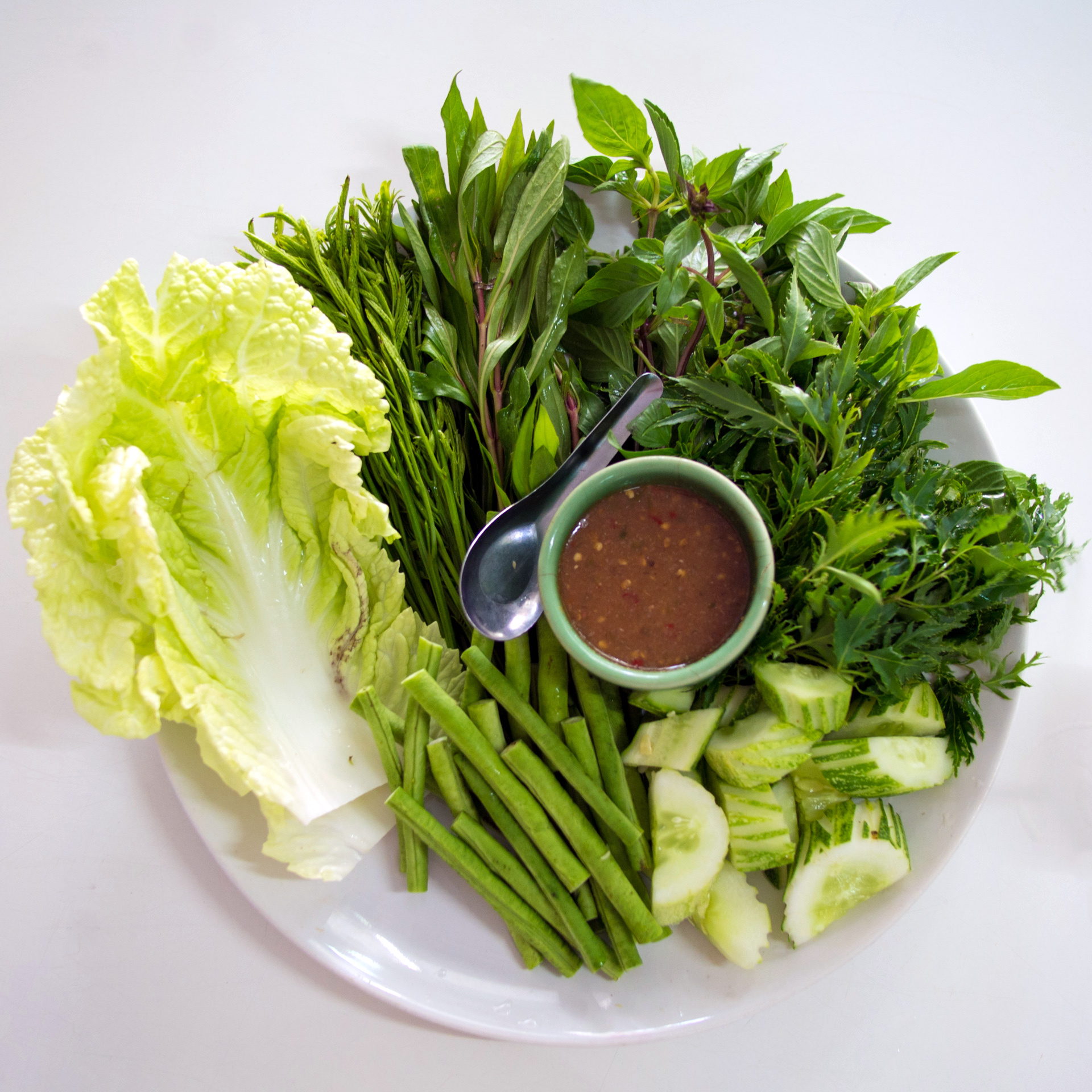
In Thailand, Polyscias fruticosa is called lep khrut (lit. "Garuda claws"). It can be eaten raw, together with a spicy dip, or it can be boiled in curries.

The leaves are used in traditional medicine to treat rheumatism, ischemia, and neuralgia. In Vietnam, they are used to treat neurodegenerative diseases. The roots are used to treat fever, dysentery, neuralgia, and rheumatic pains, in addition to their use as a diuretic. In Ghana, the plant is used to treat asthma.

Experiments have shown that the root extract of Polyscias fruticosa can extend the lifespan and improve cognitive function in rodents, though these findings have not been extended to humans.

== Toxicity ==
Ming aralia is mildly toxic to cats and dogs if ingested. The saponins in the plant can cause gastrointestinal problems and drooling.

== Sources ==
- Maas, Paul J. M.; Westra, L. Y. Th; Westra, Lubbert Y. Th; Farjon, Aljos (1993). Neotropical Plant Families: A Concise Guide to Families of Vascular Plants in the Neotropics. Koeltz Scientific Books. ISBN 978-1-878762-38-2.
- Liogier, Alain H.; Martorell, Luis F. (1982). Flora of Puerto Rico and Adjacent Islands: A Systematic Synopsis. Ed. de la Universidad. ISBN 978-0-8477-2329-4.
- Huan, Vo Duy; Yamamura, Satoshi; Ohtani, Kazuhiro; Kasai, Ryoji; Yamasaki, Kazuo; Nham, Nguyen Thoi; Chau, Hoang Minh (February 1998). "Oleanane saponins from Polyscias fruticosa". Phytochemistry. 47 (3): 451–457. Bibcode:1998PChem..47..451H. doi:10.1016/S0031-9422(97)00618-3. PMID 9433819.
- Lemke, Cal. "Polyscias fruticosa, Ming Aralia" Plant of the Week. 1 April 2004. University of Oklahoma Department of Botany & Microbiology . 4 May 2009
- Elbert, George A. "Polyscias - Ming Aralias". Rhapis Gardens Gateway to Exotic Palms and Plants.
