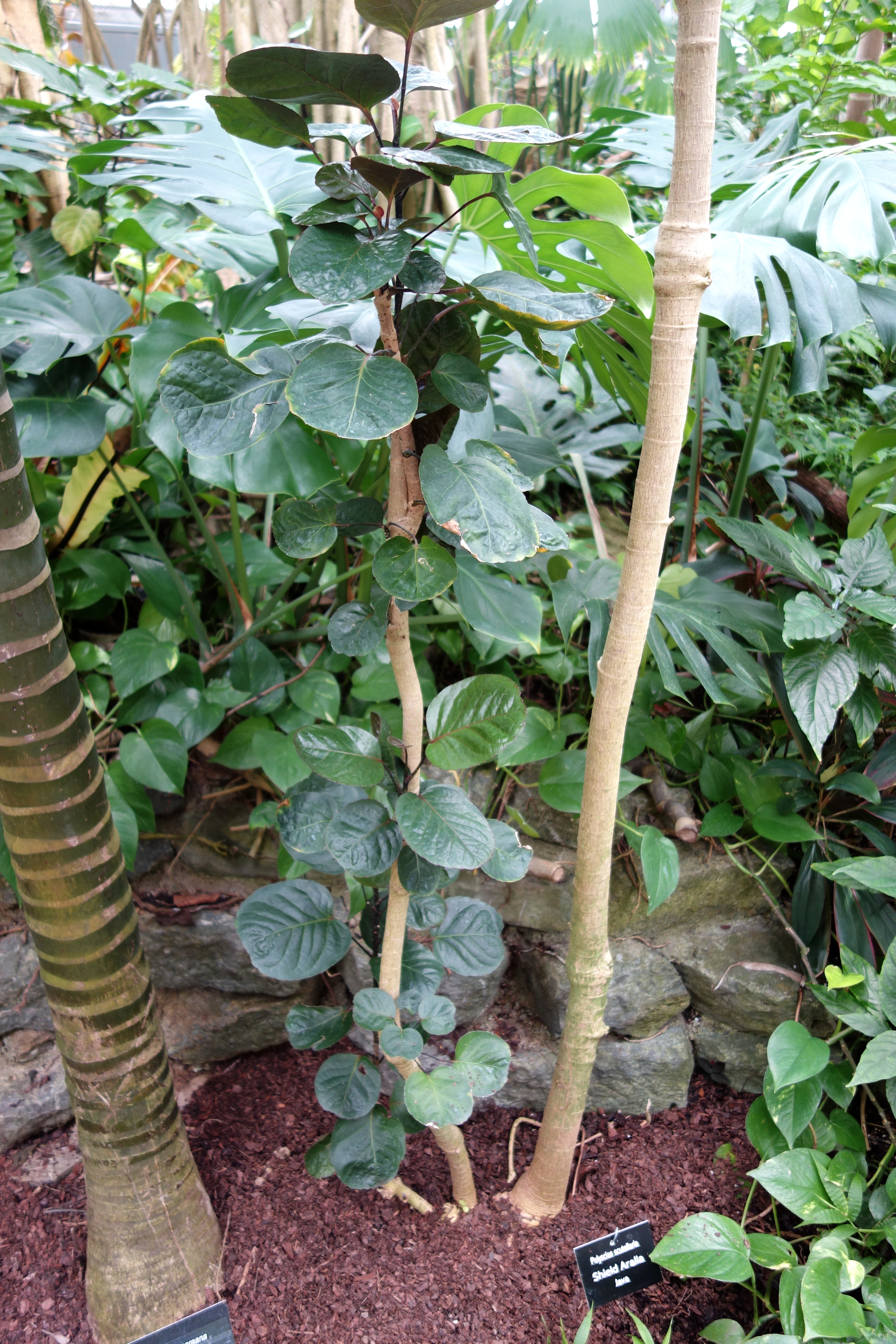

Scientific classification
- Kingdom: Plantae
- Clade: Tracheophytes
- Clade: Angiosperms
- Clade: Eudicots
- Clade: Asterids
- Order: Apiales
- Family: Araliaceae
- Genus: Polyscias
- Species: P. scutellaria

Binomial name
- Polyscias scutellaria (Burm.f.) Fosberg

= Polyscias scutellaria =

Species of shrub

Polyscias scutellaria, the shield aralia, or plum aralia, is a tropical shrub or small tree reaching 2–6 meters in height. A native of eastern Malesia and southwest Pacific islands, it is commonly grown in gardens.

The leaves and root can be used as an antiseptic and deodorant.

== Applications in cuisine ==
Ancient native Indonesians have used shield aralia leaf as a bowl substitute due to its bowl-like shape and tear-resistant properties. In modern Indonesian cuisine shield aralia can be used as fancy food packaging. Shredded shield aralia has aromatic properties that can be mixed with meat or fish to conceal the odor.
