= Polyscias neraudiana =

Conservation status
- Critically Endangered (IUCN 2.3)

Scientific classification
- Kingdom: Plantae
- Clade: Embryophytes
- Clade: Tracheophytes
- Clade: Spermatophytes
- Clade: Angiosperms
- Clade: Eudicots
- Clade: Asterids
- Order: Apiales
- Family: Araliaceae
- Genus: Polyscias
- Species: P. neraudiana

Binomial name
- Polyscias neraudiana (Drake) R. Viguier

Species of flowering plant

Polyscias neraudiana is a species of plant in the family Araliaceae. It is endemic to Mauritius. It is threatened by habitat loss.

It can be distinguished from the other Polyscias by the red flowers of its flower-spike and the smaller, longer leaf-segments of its compound leaves.
