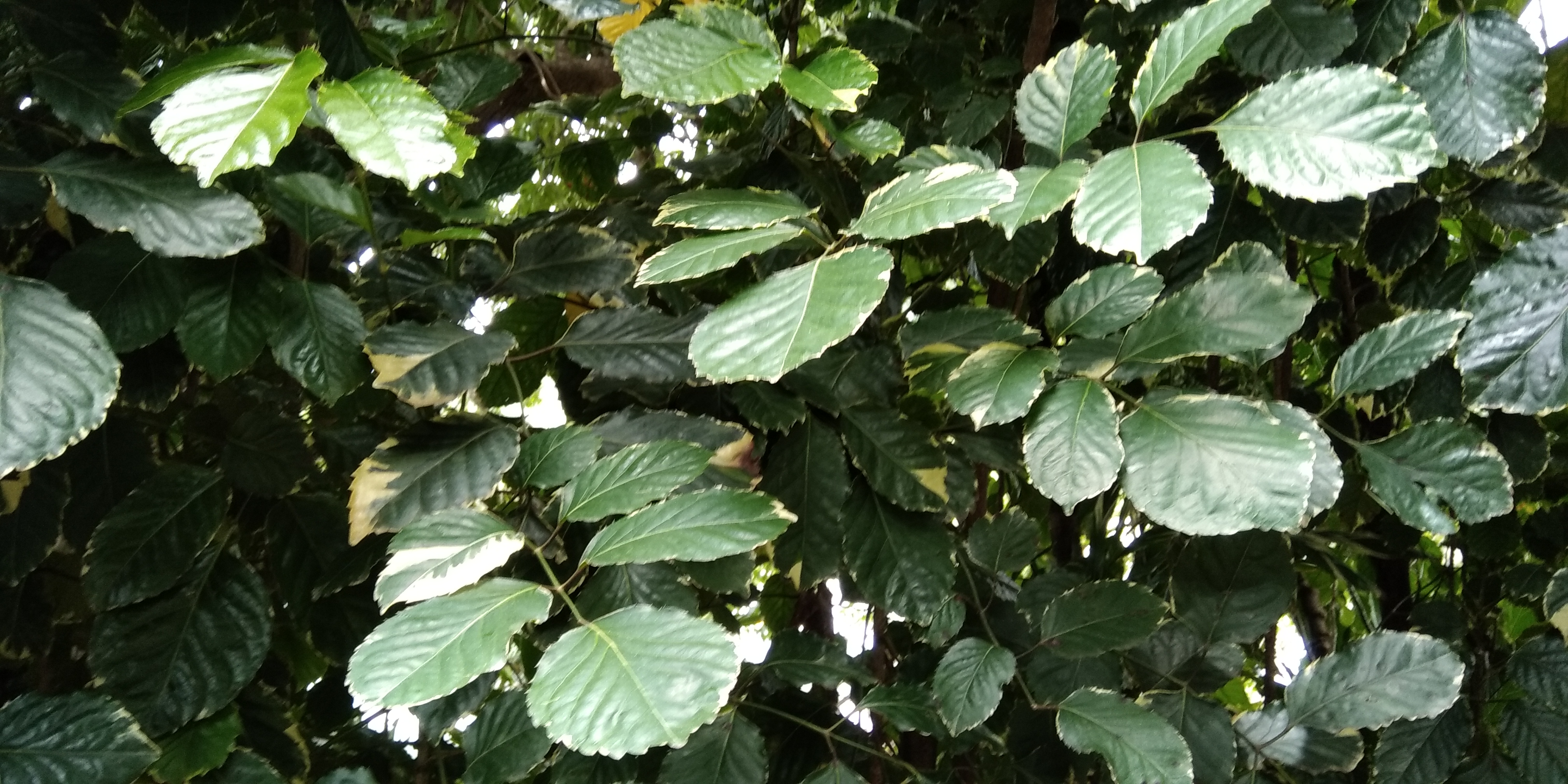
- In Habitation Clément, Martinique

Conservation status
- Critically Endangered (IUCN 2.3)

Scientific classification
- Kingdom: Plantae
- Clade: Tracheophytes
- Clade: Angiosperms
- Clade: Eudicots
- Clade: Asterids
- Order: Apiales
- Family: Araliaceae
- Genus: Polyscias
- Species: P. paniculata

Binomial name
- Polyscias paniculata (DC.) Baker

Synonyms
- Botryopanax ayresii (Baker) Hutch. Botryopanax borbonicus Miq. Botryopanax cupularis (Baker) Hutch. Gastonia paniculata (DC.) D.Dietr. Gastonia racemosa Rich. ex Drake; Gastonia saururoides (DC.) Roxb. Gilibertia paniculata DC. Gilibertia saururoides DC. Grotefendia cuneata Seem. Grotefendia paniculata (DC.) Seem. Panax ayresii (Baker) Drake; Panax commersonii Drake; Panax cupularis (Baker) Drake; Panax paniculatus (DC.) Drake; Panax racemosus Drake; Polyscias ayresii Baker Polyscias commersonii (Drake) Harms ex R.Vig. Polyscias cupularis Baker; Polyscias racemosa (Drake) Harms ex R.Vig.

= Polyscias paniculata =

Species of plant

Polyscias paniculata is a species of flowering plant in the family Araliaceae. It is endemic to Mauritius. It is threatened by habitat loss.
