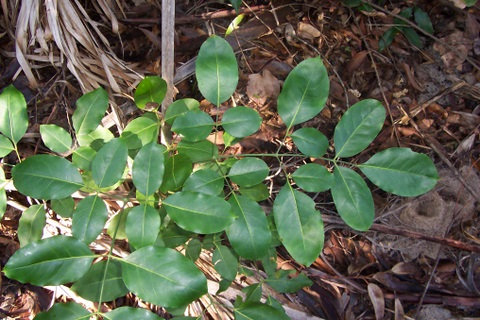
- Polyscias elegans at Wyrrabalong National Park, Australia

Scientific classification
- Kingdom: Plantae
- Clade: Embryophytes
- Clade: Tracheophytes
- Clade: Spermatophytes
- Clade: Angiosperms
- Clade: Eudicots
- Clade: Asterids
- Order: Apiales
- Family: Araliaceae
- Genus: Polyscias
- Species: P. elegans

Binomial name
- Polyscias elegans (C.Moore & F.Muell.) Harms

Synonyms
- Panax elegans C.Moore & F.Muell.; Tieghemopanax elegans (C. Moore & F. Muell.) R.Viguier.

= Polyscias elegans =

Species of tree

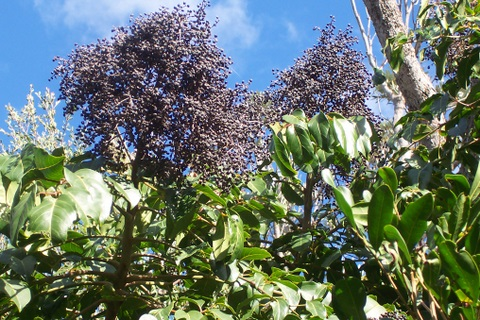
Polyscias elegans at Norah Head, Australia

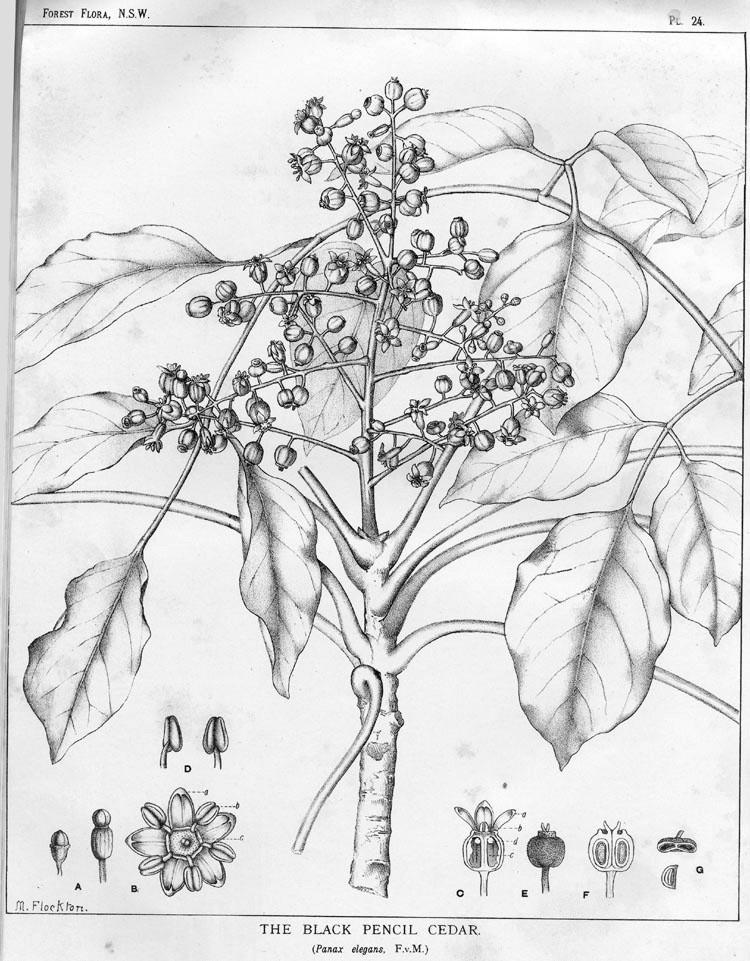
Drawing by Margaret Flockton

Polyscias elegans, known as the celery wood, is a rainforest tree of eastern Australia. It occurs in a variety of different rainforest types, from fertile basaltic soils, to sand dunes and less fertile sedimentary soils. The range of natural distribution is from Jervis Bay (35° S) in southern New South Wales to Thursday Island (10° S), north of the Australian continent. Other common names include black pencil cedar and silver basswood. Polyscias elegans is useful to bush regenerators as a nursery tree, which provides shade for longer-lived young trees underneath. Polyscias elegans is also known as Celery wood, Mowbulan whitewood, Silver basswood and White sycamore.

== Description ==
It is a fast-growing medium-sized tree with an attractive palm-like or umbrella-shaped crown. Up to 30 meters tall and a trunk diameter of 75 cm. The trunk is mostly straight, unbuttressed and cylindrical, smooth-barked on young trees but fissured, scaly and rough-barked on larger trees.

Leaves are large, pinnate or bi-pinnate with almost opposite leaflets, often in threes. Leaflets ovate in shape, with a point, 5 to 13 cm long. Leaf veins noticeable on both sides, net veins visible below.

Purple flowers form on a terminal panicle, arranged in a series of racemes in the months of February to April. However, flowers can form at other times. The fruit is a drupe; brown or purplish black in colour, 5 to 7 mm wide. Inside the drupe are two cells, containing one seed each, 5 mm long. Seed is fertile for regeneration from the droppings of the pied currawong.

The fruit is eaten by a large variety of birds, including brown cuckoo dove, Australasian figbird, green catbird, Lewin's honeyeater, olive-backed oriole, pied currawong, paradise riflebird, rose crowned fruit dove, silvereye, superb fruit dove, topknot pigeon and wompoo fruit dove.
