= Wessel Marais =

South African botanist (1929–2013)

Wessel Marais B.Sc., M.Sc. (1929–2013) was a South African botanist and plant collector.

Wessel was born in Colesberg, Northern Cape Province, on 28 December 1929, the youngest of the ten children of Barend Pieter Marais, the last blacksmith and wagon builder of Colesberg, who was of French Huguenot descent. He studied at Pretoria University (1947–1951) where he obtained an M.Sc. in Botany for the thesis 'A Morphological study of an indigenous species of rice, Oryza barthii A. Chev.'. He then (1952) joined the National Herbarium (PRE) where he undertook fieldwork during an internship in Kruger National Park and in Namibia. From 1953 to 1955 he was director of the Albany Museum Herbarium (GRA) in Grahamstown, where he studied South African Cruciferae for the Flora of Southern Africa. He carried out collecting trips to the Southwestern Cape Province, Natal, Lesotho, the Transkei, Pondoland, Griqualand East and other localities. He collected over 1,500 specimens jointly with Van der Schijff in the Kruger National Park and with Bernard de Winter in northern S.W. Africa.

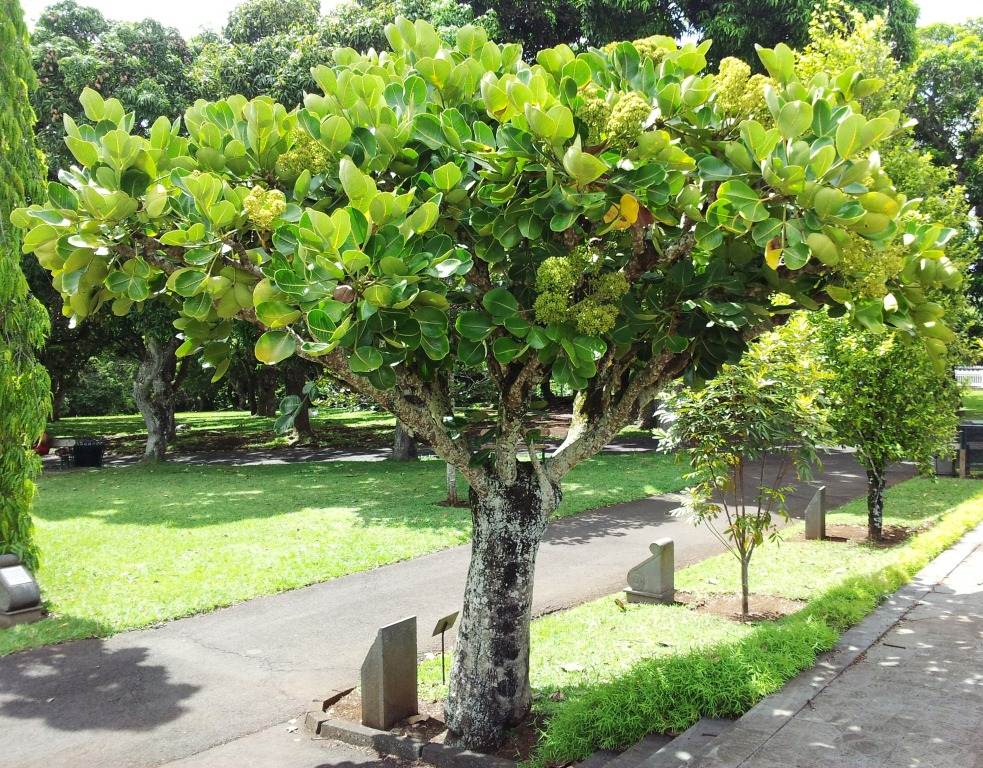
Polyscias maraisiana

He was the South African Liaison Officer at Kew Gardens (1957–1965). He then worked in the nursery trade before joining the permanent staff at the Herbarium, Kew, in 1968, initially as Senior Scientific Officer and later Principal Scientific Officer. In 1970 he became Curator of Petaloid Monocots.

At Kew he contributed to and edited the Flore des Mascareignes; he wrote the account for Tulipa for the Flora of Turkey and Romulaea for Flora Europaea. He collected in Turkey and Réunion.

One of his more unusual contributions was the identification of Pilea peperomioides, the 'Chinese Money Plant', and he kept a plant on the window sill of his office.

He took early retirement from Kew in 1986 because of arthritis. He lived in Lasvaux, Cazillac in France where he died, 27 January 2013, in a care home in Martel, Lot.

Crotalaria damarensis Engl. var. maraisiana Torre, Heliophila maraisiana Al-Shehbaz & Mummenhoff, and Polyscias maraisiana Lowry & G.M.Plunkett were named after him.

== Selected publications ==
- The Proposed flora of Southern Africa. (1958). Marais, Wessel. Memorias da Sociedade Broteriana. Coimbra 13:51–52.
- Notes on South African Cruciferae. Marais, W. (1966). Bothalia 9:97–112
- New and interesting records of African plants: Cruciferae: a new combination in Silicularia. (1969). Marais, Wessel. Bothalia, 10:70.
- Cruciferae. In L.E. Codd, B.D. Winter, D.J.B. Killick & H.B. Rycroft (Editors). (1970). Flora of Southern Africa 13:1–118
- Taxonomic Notes on Romulea (Iridaceae) from the Mediterranean Region. (1975). Kew Bulletin, 30(4), 707–708. doi:10.2307/4102915
- A New Mascarene Sesuvium (Aizoaceae). Marais, W. (1978). Kew Bulletin, 32(2), 483–483. doi:10.2307/4117120
- A New Combination in Nesogenes (Dicrastylidaceae). Marais, W. (1979). Kew Bulletin, 33(3), 420–420. doi:10.2307/4110141
- Savannosiphon gen. nov., a segregate of Lapeirousia (Iridaceae – ixioideae). (1979). Goldblatt, Peter; Marais, Wessel. Annals of the Missouri Botanical Garden 66:845–850
- Notes on Tulipa (Liliaceae). Marais, W. (1980). Kew Bulletin, 35(2), 257–259. doi:10.2307/4114569
- A New Species of Pleurostylia (Celastraceae) from Rodrigues. Marais, W. (1981). Kew Bulletin, 36(2), 229–230. doi:10.2307/4113607
- Notes on Mascarene Araliaceae. Marais, W. (1984). Kew Bulletin 39: 809–816
- Notes on Aristea (Iridaceae) in East Africa. Marais, W. (1987). Kew Bulletin, 42(4), 932–932. doi:10.2307/4109940
