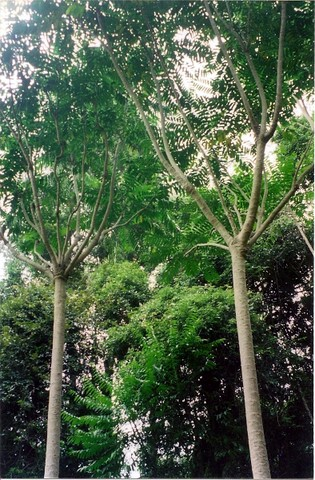
- Pencil cedar at Berrico Trig, Barrington Tops

Conservation status
- Least Concern (IUCN 3.1)

Scientific classification
- Kingdom: Plantae
- Clade: Tracheophytes
- Clade: Angiosperms
- Clade: Eudicots
- Clade: Asterids
- Order: Apiales
- Family: Araliaceae
- Genus: Polyscias
- Species: P. murrayi

Binomial name
- Polyscias murrayi (F.Muell.) Harms

Synonyms
- Nothopanax murrayi (F.Muell.) Seem.; Panax murrayi F.Muell.; Tieghemopanax murrayi (F.Muell.) R.Vig.

= Polyscias murrayi =

Species of tree

Polyscias murrayi, commonly known as celerywood or pencil cedar, is a species of plants in the family Araliaceae native to coastal areas of eastern Australia.

It occurs as a secondary regeneration species in disturbed rainforest areas, often on hillsides. The tree is identified by cylindrical trunk; abruptly forking into many branches, and supporting an impressive dark canopy.

Other common names include the umbrella tree, white basswood and pencilwood. The range of natural distribution is from the Howe Range, just over the border in the state of Victoria (37° S), up through New South Wales and to Atherton, Queensland (17° S). It also occurs in New Guinea.

== Description ==
It grows to 25 metres tall with a trunk diameter of 50 cm. It is unbranched at the end of the main trunk, then breaks out into a many branched crown. The cylindrical trunk is mostly smooth, greyish or brown. The base of the tree is not flanged, fluted or buttressed.

Leaves are alternate and pinnate with 8 to 30 leaflets, opposite on the leaf stalk, entire or toothed, ovate lanceolate in shape, 8 to 15 cm long. However, leaves may be much larger on younger trees. Leaf stalks are up to 120 cm long and leaflet stalks 3 to 8 mm long. Between each pair of leaflets on the leaf stalk, a gland may be seen. The midrib is white or paler green, raised under the leaf. Leaf venation is more easily seen on the top of the leaf.

Creamy green flowers form on stalks on umbels in the months of February to March. The fruit is a blue drupe, usually with two lobes, sometimes three. Fruit matures from April to June. Germination from fresh seed is slow.

== Ecology ==
The fruit is eaten by a variety of bird species, as well as the Herbert River ringtail possum and the Musky rat-kangaroo.

== Uses ==
Polyscias murrayi is useful to bush regenerators as a nursery tree, which provides shade for longer lived young trees underneath. It is also an attractive ornamental tree.
