= Polyscias kikuyuensis =

Conservation status
- Near Threatened (IUCN 3.1)

Scientific classification
- Kingdom: Plantae
- Clade: Tracheophytes
- Clade: Angiosperms
- Clade: Eudicots
- Clade: Asterids
- Order: Apiales
- Family: Araliaceae
- Genus: Polyscias
- Species: P. kikuyuensis

Binomial name
- Polyscias kikuyuensis Summerh.

Species of tree

Polyscias kikuyuensis, also called the parasol tree and mutati, is a species of plant in the family Araliaceae. It is endemic to Kenya, where its wood is used to make boxes and similar items. The species is confined to wet upland forest, and is threatened by habitat loss. Including the forests of Cherangani hills, Kenya.
