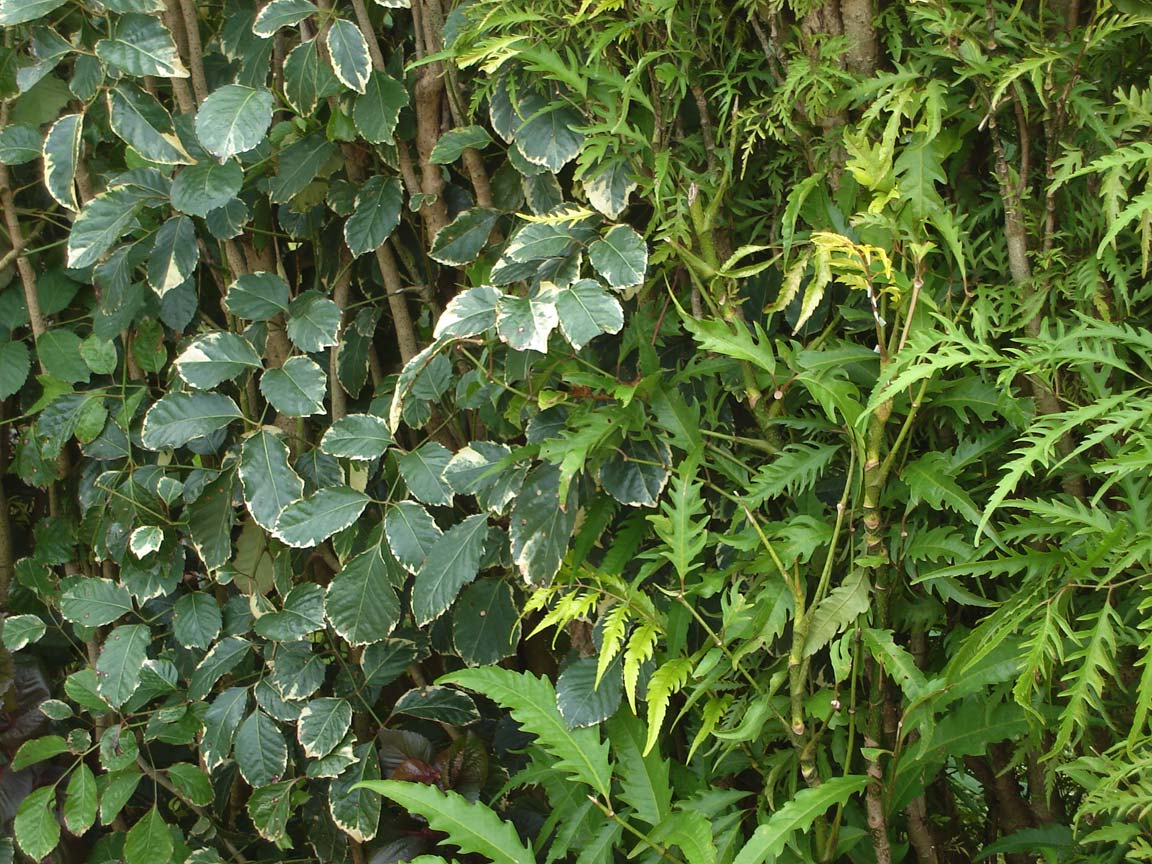
- Polyscias guilfoylei & Polyscias fruticosa

Scientific classification
- Kingdom: Plantae
- Clade: Tracheophytes
- Clade: Angiosperms
- Clade: Eudicots
- Clade: Asterids
- Order: Apiales
- Family: Araliaceae
- Subfamily: Aralioideae
- Genus: Polyscias; J.R.Forst. & G.Forst.

Species
- See text

Synonyms
- 28 synonyms: Arthrophyllum Blume; Bonnierella R.Vig.; Botryopanax Miq.; Cuphocarpus Decne. & Planch.; Dipanax Seem.; Eremopanax Baill.; Eupteron Miq.; Gastonia Comm. ex Lam.; Gelibia Hutch.; Grotefendia Seem.; Indokingia Hemsl.; Irvingia F.Muell.; Kissodendron Seem.; Maralia Thouars; Montagueia Baker f.; Munroidendron Sherff; Nesodoxa Calest.; Nothopanax Miq.; Oligoscias Seem.; Palmervandenbroekia Gibbs; Peekeliopanax Harms; Pterotropia W.F.Hillebr.; Reynoldsia A.Gray; Sciadopanax Seem.; Shirleyopanax Domin; Tetraplasandra A.Gray; Tieghemopanax R.Vig.; Triplasandra Seem.

= Polyscias =

Genus of flowering plants

Polyscias is a genus of flowering plants in the family Araliaceae with a natural distribution from tropical Africa through Southeast Asia and Australia to islands of the Pacific. As of February 2026, Plants of the World Online recognises 28 synonyms and about 180 species for the genus.

== Description ==
They are shrubs, trees or (rarely) lianes, which are mostly evergreen or occasionally deciduous. The leaves are alternate and have a membraneous or winged sheathing base of the petioles. Stipules are either absent or vestigial. Leaf morphology is varied: they may be undivided or pinnate, bipinnate or tripinnate, and the margins may be entire, toothed or lobed.

Flower characters are likewise varied, and inflorescences may be erect or pendant, and take the form of panicles, umbels, racemes, or whorls.

== Taxonomy ==
The genus was erected in 1776 by Johann Reinhold Forster and his son Georg Forster, to accommodate a plant specimen they had collected in the South Pacific.

=== Etymology ===
The name Polyscias is derived from the Greek words πολύς (polys), 'many', and skias, 'shade' or 'umbrella', and is a reference to the foliage of the plants.

== Cultivation ==
There are about six species of the genus Polyscias that are actively cultivated. The genus contains a variety of tropical plants, which include about 80 species from the Pacific islands and Southeast Asia.

== Selected species ==
- Polyscias aemiliguineae Bernardi
- Polyscias balfouriana (André) L.H.Bailey
- Polyscias cissodendron (C.Moore & F.Muell.) Harms
- Polyscias elegans (C.Moore & F.Muell.) Harms
- Polyscias flynnii (Lowry & K.R.Wood) Lowry & G.M.Plunkett
- Polyscias fruticosa (L.) Harms
- Polyscias fulva (Hiern) Harms
- Polyscias guilfoylei (W.Bull) L.H.Bailey
- Polyscias kikuyuensis Summerh.
- Polyscias maraisiana Lowry & G.M.Plunkett
- Polyscias murrayi (F.Muell.) Harms
- Polyscias neraudiana (Drake) Harms ex R.Vig.
- Polyscias oahuensis (A.Gray) Lowry & G.M.Plunkett
- Polyscias pinnata J.R.Forst. & G.Forst. - type species
- Polyscias pleiosperma (A.Gray) Lowry & G.M.Plunkett
- Polyscias racemosa (C.N.Forbes) Sherff
- Polyscias rodriguesiana (Marais) Lowry & G.M.Plunkett
- Polyscias sambucifolia (Sieber ex DC.) Harms
- Polyscias sandwicensis (A.Gray) Lowry & G.M.Plunkett
- Polyscias scutellaria (Burm.f.) Fosberg

== Endangered and critically endangered species ==
The following species are endangered (EN) or critically endangered (CR). List may be incomplete.

- Polyscias aemiliguineae: CR – Reunion
- Polyscias bisattenuata: CR – Kaua`i, Hawai`i
- Polyscias dichroostachya: EN – Mauritius
- Polyscias flynnii: EN – Kaua`i, Hawai`i
- Polyscias gracilis: CR – Mauritius
- Polyscias letestui: EN
- Polyscias lydgatei: EN – O`ahu, Hawai`i
- Polyscias mauritiana: EN – Mauritius
- Polyscias neraudiana: CR – Mauritius
- Polyscias paniculata: CR – Mauritius
- Polyscias racemosa: EN – Kaua`i, Hawai`i
- Polyscias taomensis: CR – New Caledonia
