= Tetraplasandra =

Genus of plants

Tetraplasandra is a no longer recognised genus of plants in the ivy family, Araliaceae. They are small to medium trees, (rarely shrubs or large trees) of mesic to wet forests.

Some authors have recognized as many as 19 species in Tetraplasandra, while others have recognized as few as six. In 2007, the authors of a scientific paper recommended that the genus be divided into nine species. In 2010, all of these nine species were included in Polyscias subgenus Tetraplasandra, a subgenus of 21 species in the large genus Polyscias, which will comprise about 250 species, when about 90 undescribed species are published.

The range of variation in Tetraplasandra is unusually large for a genus in Araliaceae Most of the species were originally described in other genera which were later merged with Tetraplasandra.

The type species for the genus is T. hawaiensis.

As defined by William R. Philipson in 1970, Tetraplasandra is endemic to Hawaii and occurs on six of the eight main islands. Niʻihau and Kahoʻolawe are low-lying and dry; consequently, they do not support Tetraplasandra. T. oahuensis, T. kavaiensis, and T. hawaiensis are found on six, five, and four of the islands, respectively. The other species are single-island endemics.

T. oahuensis and T.kavaiensis have done well in cultivation in Southern California. They are sensitive to heat, but very tolerant of shade, and they need some wind protection. In horticulture, T. kavaiensis has often been misidentified as T. meiandra. True T. meiandra is now treated as a synonym of T. oahuensis.

T. gymnocarpa, a rare tree of Oʻahu, is considered an oddity, since it is the only species in Araliaceae whose flowers have a completely superior ovary.

The genus Tetraplasandra has long been known as a close relative of the obsolete genera Gastonia, Reynoldsia, and Munroidendron. This was confirmed by a pollen study in 1971. In 2010, those four genera, along with Arthrophyllum and Cuphocarpus, were all sunk into Polyscias, raising the number of species in that genus from about 100 to 159.

Four Hawaiian names are applied to groups of Tetraplasandra species. T. hawaiensis is known as ʻohe. T. kavaiensis and T. gymnocarpa are called ʻoheʻohe. T. waimeae is called ʻohe kikoʻola. T. oahuensis and T. lydgatei are called ʻohe mauka. The related name, ʻohe makai, is applied to Polyscias sandwicensis, formerly known as Reynoldsia sandwicensis. These names closely correspond to clades currently recognized within Tetraplasandra.

== Species in Polyscias subgenus Tetraplasandra ==
Most of the information in the species list is from Lowry and Plunkett (2010). Synonyms are names of species accepted by Sherff (1955) or by Frodin and Govaerts (2003), except for Tetraplasandra lydgatei and Tetraplasandra bisattenuata, which were resurrected after 2003. For complete synonymy and distribution within the Hawaiian Islands, see Lowry (1990).

- Polyscias belensis Philipson – New Guinea
- Polyscias bisattenuata (Earl Edward Sherff) Lowry & G. M. Plunkett (= Tetraplasandra bisattenuata) – Kauaʻi
- Polyscias borneensis Philipson – Borneo, Philippines
- Polyscias florosa Philipson – Philippines
- Polyscias flynnii (Lowry & K.R.Wood) Lowry & G. M. Plunkett (= Tetraplasandra flynnii) – Kauaʻi
- Polyscias gymnocarpa (Hillebrand) Lowry & G. M. Plunkett (= Tetraplasandra gymnocarpa) – (Oʻahu)
- Polyscias hawaiensis (Asa Gray) Lowry & G. M. Plunkett (= Tetraplasandra hawaiensis) – Molokaʻi, Lānaʻi, Maui, island of Hawaiʻi
- Polyscias kavaiensis (H.Mann) Lowry & G. M. Plunkett (= T. micrantha, T. turbans) – Kauaʻi, Oʻahu, Lānaʻi, Maui, island of Hawaiʻi
- Polyscias lanutoensis (Hochreutiner) Lowry & G. M. Plunkett (= Reynoldsia lanutoensis, Reynoldsia grayana, Reynoldsia tauensis) – Samoa
- Polyscias lydgatei (Hillebrand) Lowry & G. M. Plunkett (= Tetraplasandra lydgatei) – Oʻahu
- Polyscias marchionensis (F.B.H. Brown) Lowry & G. M. Plunkett (= Reynoldsia marchionensis) – Marquesas
- Polyscias oahuensis (A.Gray) Lowry & G. M. Plunkett (= T. kaalae, T. kahanana, T. kohalae, T. lanaiensis, T. meiandra, T. munroi, T. oahuensis, T. pupukeensis, T. waianensis) – Kauaʻi, Oʻahu, Molokaʻi, Lānaʻi, Maui, island of Hawaiʻi
- Polyscias philipsonii Bernardi – New Guinea
- Polyscias pleiosperma (Asa Gray) Lowry & G. M. Plunkett (= Reynoldsia pleiosperma) – Samoa
- Polyscias racemosa (C.N.Forbes) Lowry & G. M. Plunkett (= Munroidendron racemosum) – Kauaʻi
- Polyscias sandwicensis (Asa Gray) Lowry & G. M. Plunkett (= Reynoldsia sandwicensis) – Oʻahu, Molokaʻi, Lānaʻi, Maui, island of Hawaiʻi
- Polyscias serratifolia (Miquel) Lowry & G. M. Plunkett (= Gastonia serratifolia) – Malesia to Solomon Islands
- Polyscias spectabilis (Harms) Lowry & G. M. Plunkett (= Gastonia spectabilis) – New Guinea to Solomon Islands
- Polyscias verrucosa (Seemann) Lowry & G. M. Plunkett (= Reynoldsia verrucosa, Reynoldsia tahitiensis) – Tahiti
- Polyscias waialealae (Rock) Lowry & G. M. Plunkett (= Tetraplasandra waialealae, T. lihuensis) – Kauaʻi
- Polyscias waimeae (Wawra) Lowry & G. M. Plunkett (= Tetraplasandra waimeae) – Kauaʻi

== History ==
The genus name was erected by Asa Gray in 1854, in his account of the botany of the U.S. Exploring Expedition (1838-1842). The name is derived from Greek, tetraplasios, "fourfold", and andros, "male, stamen".

Asa Gray named only one species, T. hawaiensis, in Tetraplasandra. The tree that was later known as Tetraplasandra oahuensis (now Polyscias oahuensis), he named Gastonia oahuensis, but with considerable doubt about its placement.

In 1867, Horace Mann Jr. named two new species, H. kavaiensis and H. dipyrenum in Heptapleurum, a genus that Joseph Gaertner had named in 1791, in De Fructibus et Seminibus Plantarum. Mann created a new section in Heptapleurum for the two Hawaiian species. He named the new section "Pterotropia". Heptapleurum is no longer recognized and its type species is now known as Schefflera stellata. Earl Edward Sherff did not consider the two species named by Mann to be truly distinct. He included both in Tetraplasandra kavaiensis, which he divided into eight varieties, including T. kavaiensis var. dipyrena.

From 1864 to 1868, Berthold Carl Seemann published a series of articles in the Journal of Botany, British and Foreign, all of which were entitled "Revision of the natural order Hederaceae". In 1868, he published a book by the same title. He divided what later became Hawaiian Tetraplasandra into four genera. He maintained Tetraplasandra for T. hawaiensis and created two new genera; Triplasandra, for Asa Gray's Gastonia oahuensis and Dipanax for Mann's Tetraplasandra dipyrena. He placed Mann's Tetraplasandra kavaiensis in Agalma, a genus that Friedrich A.W. Miquel had established in 1856.

In 1873, Heinrich Wawra von Fernsee named a new species from Kauaʻi as Tetraplasandra waimeae.

In 1888, in the first flora of the Hawaiian Islands, Wilhelm B. Hillebrand raised Horace Mann Jr's Pterotropia to generic rank as Pterotropia. He added to it, a new species from Oʻahu, which he named Pterotropia gymnocarpa. This work was published posthumously by his son, William Francis Hillebrand to whom the name Pterotropia is often incorrectly attributed. The name Pterotropia is now considered illegitimate because, while Pterotropia is an older name, Dipanax is older at generic rank and therefore has priority.

Wilhelm B. Hillebrand put two species in Tetraplasandra: T. hawaiensis and T. waimeae. He placed four species in Triplasandra: Tri. oahuensis, Tri. meiandra, Tri. lydgatei, and Tri. kaalae. Three of these were newly named. Tetraplasandra waimeae is now known to be closer to T. oahuensis than to T. hawaiensis.

In 1898, in a monograph on Araliaceae for Die Natürlichen Pflanzenfamilien, Hermann Harms adopted Hillebrand's Pterotropia, but sank Triplasandra back into Tetraplasandra. Harms accepted the six species that Hillebrand had placed in Triplasandra and Tetraplasandra. He also included in Tetraplasandra, the Malesian species that was later called Gastonia serratifolia and then Polyscias serratifolia.

In 1913, Joseph F.C. Rock described a new species from Kauaʻi, and named it Tetraplasandra waialealae.

In 1917, Charles Noyes Forbes named another species from Kauaʻi as Tetraplasandra racemosa. Both of these are still recognized as distinct species, but in 1952, Earl Edward Sherff erected the new genus Munroidendron for T. racemosa.

In 1955, Sherff wrote a revision of the Hawaiian species of Tetraplasandra. It included a detailed taxonomic history. Sherff considered Tetraplasandra to consist of three species from Malesia and 19 from Hawaii. In this treatment, he named several new species and included others that had been named by Joseph F.C. Rock, Otto Degener and Carl J.F. Skottsberg. Of all of the species named by Sherff, only T. bisattenuata is still recognized today.

Sherff recognized the uniqueness of T. hawaiensis, a judgement that was corroborated by subsequent evidence. He understood that T. waimeae and T. waialealae are closely related and that these two belong in a group with T. oahuensis, T. lydgatei, and T. bisattenuata. He placed Pterotropia in synonymy under Tetraplasandra, writing that "a monographic study of Tetraplasandra reveals so much interlocking and overlapping of characters between Tetraplasandra and the species assigned to Pterotropia as to remove all warrant for their segregation".

In 1990, Tetraplasandra was covered in a flora of Hawaii. Only six species were recognized, pending further study. These were T. gymnocarpa, T. hawaiensis, T. kavaiensis, T. oahuensis, T. waialealae, and T. waimeae. A detailed description and full synonymy were given for each species.

In 2000, a new species from the island of Kauaʻi, Tetraplasandra flynnii, was described in Novon. At that time, it was known from only three individuals. Tetraplasandra lydgatei was resurrected in 2005 in a paper in Pacific Science. At that time, it was known from only six individuals on the island of Oʻahu.

In 2007, a molecular phylogenetic study compared by cladistic methods, the DNA sequences of two regions of nuclear DNA for eight species of Tetraplasandra and their close relatives. The two DNA regions, known as Internal transcribed spacer and non-transcribed spacer are adjacent to genes for Ribosomal RNA. In this study, the former genus Tetraplasandra was resolved as monophyletic and consisting of three clades.

T. hawaiensis was found to be sister to the rest of Tetraplasandra. T. kavaiensis, T. flynnii, and T. gymnocarpa formed a strongly supported clade. The remaining clade consisted of T. bisattenuata, T. oahuensis, T. waimeae, and T. waialealae. T. bisattenuata was found to be distinct and the authors recommended that it be reinstated.

Tetraplasandra oahuensis is heterogeneous and probably polyspecific, but the authors recommended that further studies be conducted before any attempt to divide it.

== Polyscias subgenus Tetraplasandra ==
In 2010, a molecular phylogenetic study was published for the seven genera which at that time constituted the pinnate Araliaceae. It was found that the six smaller genera are all embedded in the large genus Polyscias. In a companion paper, published simultaneously, the six smaller genera (Arthrophyllum, Cuphocarpus, Gastonia, Reynoldsia, Munroidendron, and Tetraplasandra) were placed in synonymy under Polyscias, thereby raising the number of species in that genus from about 100 to 159. About 80 species from Madagascar and ten from New Caledonia are known from recently collected specimens. They will be named and described in forthcoming papers. Many of these were photographed during field work.

Polyscias has been divided into 11 subgenera, with seven species placed incertae sedis, that is, without decision on which part of Polyscias they should belong to. Polyscias subgenus Tetraplasandra comprises 21 species, consisting of the former genera Tetraplasandra, Munroidendron, and Reynoldsia, as well as the two Malesian species that were in Gastonia, and four of the six species that Philipson had placed in Polyscias section Eupteron.

Polyscias acuminata might also belong to Polyscias subgenus Tetraplasandra. It was placed incertae sedis, but has characters resembling those of subgenus Tetraplasandra. In other ways, however, it resembles Polyscias nodosa, the sole member of Polyscias subgenus Eupteron.

The former genus Tetraplasandra is a monophyletic group and is sister to a clade consisting of only two species: Polyscias racemosa and Polyscias sandwicensis. The former had constituted the monospecific genus Munroidendron and the latter is the type species for the previously accepted genus Reynoldsia. This "Hawaiian clade" of 11 species consists of all of the native Hawaiian members of Polyscias.

The former genus Reynoldsia turned out to be diphyletic, with its single Hawaiian species not forming a clade with the four species from Samoa, Tahiti, and the Marquesas. Basal relationships in Polyscias subgenus Tetraplasandra remain obscure because of insufficient taxon sampling in phylogenetic studies.

== Sources ==
Gregory M. Plunkett, Jun Wen, Porter P. Lowry II, Murray J. Henwood, Pedro Fiaschi, and Anthony D. Mitchell. accepted, undated. Araliaceae, pages ??. In: Klaus Kubitzki (editor); ?? (volume editor). The Families and Genera of Vascular Plants volume ??. Springer-Verlag: Berlin; Heidelberg, Germany. ISBN ??
