= Gastonia (plant) =

Genus of flowering plants

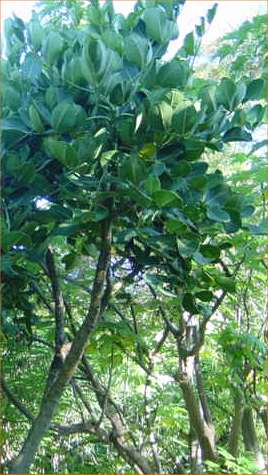
Polyscias cutispongia (=Gastonia cutispongia)

Gastonia Commerson ex Lamarck is a formerly accepted genus of plants in the ivy and ginseng family, Araliaceae. It had been known as an unnatural group, but was recognized as late as 2010, when its nine species were distributed to four different subgenera of the large genus Polyscias. Because the genus Gastonia is now obsolete, its species are herein referred to by their names in Polyscias.

The species that constituted Gastonia are mostly island endemics, with Madagascar and New Guinea being the largest land masses on which any of them naturally occur. Gastonia had a disjunct distribution, with three species from the Seychelles, three more from the Mascarenes, one from Madagascar and the Comoro Islands, and two distributed from Malesia to the Solomon Islands.

Gastonia is a genus of small to large size trees. It shares with related genera, the lack of an articulation on the pedicel, below the flower. It is distinguished from Reynoldsia, Munroidendron, and Tetraplasandra by the radiating style arms that persist on the fruit.

== Species ==
Listed below are the nine species placed in Gastonia by Frodin and Govaerts (2003). Names in Polyacias are from Lowry and Plunkett (2010).

- Polyscias crassa (Hemsley) Lowry & G. M. Plunkett (= Gastonia crassa)
- Polyscias cutispongia ( Lamarck) Baker (= Gastonia cutispongia)
- Polyscias duplicata (Thouars ex Baillon) Lowry & G. M. Plunkett (= Gastonia duplicata)
- Polyscias maraisiana Lowry & G. M. Plunkett (= Gastonia elegans, Gastonia mauritiana)
- Polyscias lionnetii (F. Friedmann) Lowry & G. M. Plunkett (= Gastonia lionnetii)
- Polyscias rodriguesiana (Marais) Lowry & G. M. Plunkett (= Gastonia rodriguesiana)
- Polyscias sechellarum Baker (= Gastonia sechellarum)
  - P. sechellarum var. contracta
  - P. sechellarum var. curiosae
  - P. sechellarum var. sechellarum
- Polyscias serratifolia (Miquel) Lowry & G. M. Plunkett (= Gastonia serratifolia)
- Polyscias spectabilis (Harms) Lowry & G. M. Plunkett (= Gastonia spectabilis)

== Notes on selected species ==
Polyscias spectabilis is from New Guinea and the Solomon Islands. It sometimes exceeds 40 m (130 ft) in height, and is the tallest member of Araliaceae. Like most members of Polyscias, P. spectabilis is sparingly branched, sometimes even palm-like in form, at least when young. Mature individuals of P. spectabilis are sometimes unbranched for 3/4 of the height of the tree. Hermann Harms erected the monotypic genus Peekeliopanax for it in 1926, but was not followed by other authors.

The type species for Gastonia is Gastonia cutispongia (now Polyscias cutispongia). It is a tall, smooth tree with spongy bark. It is native to Réunion and sometimes planted there, but it has become very rare.

Polyscias maraisiana is endemic to Mauritius and was cultivated in Europe in the 19th century, but has not been seen there since that time. It was considered exotic on account of its strikingly heteroblastic leaves.

Polyscias maraisiana has been the subject of some nomenclatural instability. In 1984, Wessel Marais separated it from Gastonia cutispongia as Gastonia mauritiana. In 2003, it was shown that the correct name for this species was Gastonia elegans because it had first been described in 1866 as Terminalia elegans. This description was a large and unexpected taxonomic error because Terminalia is in the Myrtalean family Combretaceae. In 2010, when this species was transferred to Polyscias, the specific epithet had to be changed again because the names Polyscias mauritiana and Polyscias elegans already existed. The latter two are in the Polyscias subgenera Grotefendia and Tieghemopanax, respectively.

The most widespread and variable of the species in the former Gastonia is Polyscias serratifolia. It ranges through most of Malesia and from there to the Solomon Islands. Some of its varieties have been named as separate species and placed in other genera, such as Arthrophyllum and Tetraplasandra. These were united into one species by Philipson, as Gastonia papuana in 1970, and as Gastonia serratifolia in 1979.

== History ==
Quattrocchi states that Gastonia was "named after Gaston d'Orléans, 1608-1660, a patron and promoter of botany and floriculture". The name was originated by Philibert Commerson, but validated later, in 1788, by Jean-Baptiste Lamarck in Encyclopédie Méthodique.

Lamarck gave a detailed description of the species that he named Gastonia cutispongia. He named another species, but gave it only a cursory description. No one today is really sure of what the other species was. Some authors believe that it was not even a member of Araliaceae.

Other species were added to Gastonia in the 19th century. In 1898, Hermann Harms transferred what is now Polyscias sechellarum to Gastonia in a landmark monograph on Araliaceae in Die Natürlichen Pflanzenfamilien.

William Raymond Philipson gave Gastonia its modern definition in 1970. He included Malesian species that had been in Tetraplasandra, thus restricting that genus to the Hawaiian Islands. He also reduced the monotypic genera Indokingia (Polyscias crassa) and Peekeliopanax (Polyscias spectabilis) into synonymy under Gastonia.

William Botting Hemsley had named Indokingia in 1906 in Hooker's Icones Plantarum. Peekeliopanax was a name that Hermann Harms had applied to a flowering specimen in 1926. A few years later, he placed a fruiting specimen of the same species under Gastonia.

In 2003, a checklist and nomenclator was published for Araliaceae by Kew Gardens. Nine species were recognized therein for Gastonia. The genus was described as "generalized, although in details, it is quite varied". Since that time, molecular phylogenetic studies, based on DNA sequences, have shown that Gastonia was polyphyletic. These studies have shown that biogeography is strongly correlated with relationships in Araliaceae.

In 2010, the genus Polyscias was expanded from about 100 species to 159. The number of species in Polyscias will be around 250 when the undescribed species are published. Six genera (Arthrophyllum, Cuphocarpus, Gastonia, Reynoldsia, Munroidendron, and Tetraplasandra) were placed in synonymy under Polyscias. In accordance with the phylogenetic studies of DNA, Polyscias was divided into 11 subgenera (Polyscias, Grotefendia, Maralia, Arthrophyllum, Cuphocarpus, Tetraplasandra, Eupteron, Sciadopanax, Tieghemopanax, Indokingia, and Palmervandenbroekia) and seven species were left incertae sedis.

The nine species that had been in Gastonia went to four different subgenera of Polyscias; three species went to Grotefendia, three more to Indokingia, two to Tetraplasandra, and one to Maralia.

Polyscias cutispongia, Polyscias maraisiana, and Polyscias rodriguesiana are endemic to Réunion, Mauritius, and Rodrigues, respectively. The latter two were separated from P. cutispongia in 1984. They are in ''Polyscias'' subgenus Grotefendia, which comprises 15 species, all from the Mascarene Islands. The type species for Polyscias subgenus Grotefendia is Polyscias repanda.

Polyscias subgenus Grotefendia contains Polyscias cutispongia, the type species for Gastonia. If the subgenus Grotefendia were to be raised to the taxonomic rank of genus, the name Gastonia would have priority over Grotefendia, according to the ICNAFP.

Polyscias crassa, Polyscias sechellarum, and Polyscias lionnetii are all from the Seychelles, with Polyscias lionnetii being very rare and restricted to the island of Mahé. These are the only species of Polyscias in the Seychelles, and together, they constitute ''Polyscias'' subgenus Indokingia. "Polyscias seychellarum" is an orthographical variant of Polyscias sechellarum. Polyscias sechellarum was divided into three varieties in 1987, but some authors have declined to recognize them until further studies can be done on this species.

Polyscias duplicata (formerly Gastonia duplicata) is in ''Polyscias'' subgenus Maralia. Maralia is, by far, the largest subgenus of Polyscias, with about 115 species. Most of them, like Polyscias duplicata, are endemic to Madagascar.

Polyscias serratifolia and Polyscias spectabilis are now in ''Polyscias'' subgenus Tetraplasandra. This is a wide-ranging subgenus of 21 species. Eleven species are endemic to Hawaii, and ten others are distributed in a large area that includes Malesia and extends eastward to Tahiti.

== Sources ==
Gregory M. Plunkett, Jun Wen, Porter P. Lowry II, Murray J. Henwood, Pedro Fiaschi, and Anthony D. Mitchell. accepted, undated. Araliaceae, pages ??. In: Klaus Kubitzki (editor); ?? (volume editor). The Families and Genera of Vascular Plants volume ??. Springer-Verlag: Berlin; Heidelberg, Germany. ISBN ??
