= Reynoldsia (plant) =

Former genus of plants

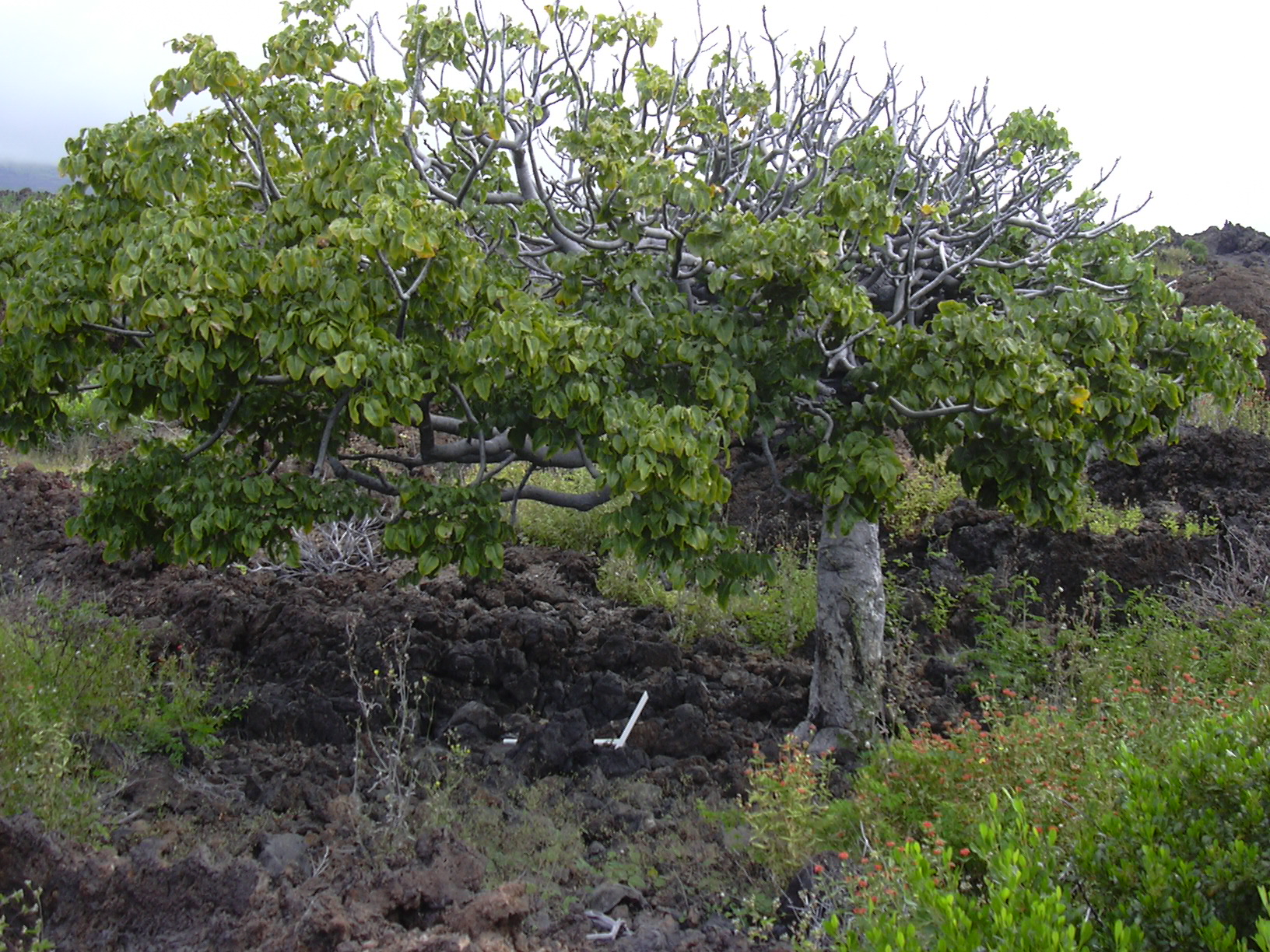
Polyscias sandwicensis, formerly Reynoldsia sandwicensis

Reynoldsia is a formerly recognised genus of plants in the ivy family, Araliaceae. In 2003, Kew Gardens published a checklist for Araliaceae, in which eight species were recognized for Reynoldsia: four from Samoa, two from Tahiti, one from the Marquesas, and one from Hawaii. In 2010, a phylogenetic comparison of DNA data showed that Reynoldsia was polyphyletic, consisting of two groups that are not each other's closest relatives. In a companion paper, three of the species were "sunk" into synonymy with others, reducing the number of species to five. All species that were formerly in Reynoldsia are now in Polyscias subgenus Tetraplasandra, a subgenus of 21 species indigenous to Malesia and the Pacific islands.

Reynoldsia was a genus of shrubs to medium-sized trees, mostly of dry habitats, especially the leeward sides of tropical Pacific islands. The leaves are imparipinnate, and alternate. The leaf margin is never completely entire, but varies from obscurely to patently dentate.

William R. Philipson considered Reynoldsia to be hard to distinguish from Tetraplasandra, another defunct genus to which it was closely related. In general, Reynoldsia can be recognized by its toothed leaflets, greater number of ovary cells, and smaller number of stamens.

Polyscias sandwicensis (formerly Reynoldsia sandwicensis) is cultivated, albeit rarely, in Hawaii. Instructions for its cultivation are available.

== Species ==
Eight species were listed by Frodin and Govaerts (2003) for Reynoldsia. Lowry and Plunkett (2010) recognized only five of these, and placed them in Polyscias subgenus Tetraplasandra. The synonyms given below are the species recognized by Frodin and Govaerts (2003).

- Polyscias lanutoensis (Hochreutiner) Lowry & G. M. Plunkett (= Reynoldsia lanutoensis, Reynoldsia grayana, Reynoldsia tauensis)
- Polyscias marchionensis (F.B.H. Brown) Lowry & G. M. Plunkett (= Reynoldsia marchionensis)
- Polyscias pleiosperma (Asa Gray) Lowry & G. M. Plunkett (= Reynoldsia pleiosperma)
- Polyscias sandwicensis (Asa Gray) Lowry & G. M. Plunkett (= Reynoldsia sandwicensis)
- Polyscias verrucosa (Seemann) Lowry & G. M. Plunkett (= Reynoldsia verrucosa, Reynoldsia tahitiensis)

== History ==
The genus Reynoldsia was erected in 1854 by Asa Gray in his account of the botany of the United States Exploring Expedition (1838-1842). The genus was named for Jeremiah N. Reynolds, a plant collector in Chile in the early 19th century. Gray named two species: Reynoldsia pleiosperma from Samoa and Reynoldsia sandwicensis from Hawaii. John Hutchinson designated the latter as the type species for Reynoldsia in 1967. This is not recorded in Index Nominum Genericorum, where such information is usually found.

Berthold Carl Seemann named a Tahitian species, Reynoldsia verrucosa, in 1864. In 1873, fr:Jean Nadeaud named another Tahitian species, Reynoldsia tahitensis. Many authors, such as Forest B. H. Brown, did not accept R. tahitensis as a separate species from R. verrucosa.

In 1925, Bénédict P.G. Hochreutiner named a second species from Samoa, Reynoldsia lanutoensis. In 1935, a third species from Samoa, Reynoldsia grayana was named by Erling Christophersen. Christophersen suggested that some plants from a place called Tau might be a fourth species of Reynoldsia in Samoa. Also in 1935, Reynoldsia marchionensis, a species from the Marquesas, was named by Forest B.H. Brown. The rare Samoan endemic, Reynoldsia tauensis, was finally published as a separate species in 1968 by Albert C. Smith and Benjamin Clemens Stone.

Some sources state that there are two species of Reynoldsia in the Society Islands, and this error has been copied from one source to another. An examination of the references cited here shows that R. marchionensis is the only species name in Reynoldsia that was ever published for a plant from the Society Islands.

Earl Edward Sherff believed that there were eight species of Reynoldsia in Hawaii. In 1952, he published names for these, as well as descriptions and an identification key. Subsequent authors have regarded these names as merely regional variants or forms of Reynoldsia sandwicensis.

In 2003, a checklist and nomenclator was published for Araliaceae. Eight species were recognized therein. The authors stated that Reynoldsia is "seen as biphyletic". The biphyly of Reynoldsia was confirmed in 2007, in a molecular phylogenetic study of what is now called ''Polyscias'' subgenus Tetraplasandra. It was confirmed again, in 2010, in a study of DNA sequences of selected genes in the pinnate genera of Araliaceae.

In an accompanying paper in Plant Diversity and Evolution, all of the pinnate Araliaceae were placed in the large genus Polyscias, thus raising the number of species in that genus from about 100 to 159, not counting about 90 species that will be published in forthcoming papers. Six of the genera that were recognized in the 2003 checklist (Arthrophyllum, Cuphocarpus, Gastonia, Reynoldsia, Munroidendron, and Tetraplasandra) were subsumed into Polyscias.

Polyscias was then divided into 11 subgenera (Polyscias, Grotefendia, Maralia, Arthrophyllum, Cuphocarpus, Tetraplasandra, Eupteron, Sciadopanax, Tieghemopanax, Indokingia, and Palmervandenbroekia) and 7 species (Polyscias acuminata, Polyscias macdowallii, Polyscias mollis, Polyscias murrayi, Polyscias ledermannii, Polyscias pentamera, and Polyscias purpurea) were placed in Polyscias incertae sedis (not in any subgroup thereof). All of the species of the former Reynoldsia are now in Polyscias subgenus Tetraplasandra.

This subgenus consists of the four south Pacific species that were in Reynoldsia, four of the six species that Philipson had placed in Polyscias section Eupteron, the two Malesian species that had been in Gastonia, and a Hawaiian clade of 11 species. The Hawaiian clade consists of the sister species Polyscias sandwicensis (formerly Reynoldsia sandwicensis) and Polyscias racemosa (formerly Munroidendron racemosum), as well as a monophyletic group of nine species that had been in Tetraplasandra as defined by Philipson in 1970.

When Polyscias was recircumscribed in 2010, the authors did not recognize all of the eight species that had been recognized in 2003. They placed R. grayana and R. tauensis into synonymy under R. lanutoensis. They likewise subsumed R. tahitiensis into R. verrucosa. The resulting five species were transferred to Polyscias as P. lanutoensis, P. pleiosperma, P. marchionensis, P. verrucosa, and P. sandwicensis.

== Sources ==
Gregory M. Plunkett, Jun Wen, Porter P. Lowry II, Murray J. Henwood, Pedro Fiaschi, and Anthony D. Mitchell. accepted, undated. Araliaceae, pages ??. In: Klaus Kubitzki (editor); ?? (volume editor). The Families and Genera of Vascular Plants volume ??. Springer-Verlag: Berlin; Heidelberg, Germany. ISBN ??
