= Arthrophyllum =

Genus of flowering plants

Arthrophyllum is a defunct genus of plants in the family Araliaceae. It was recognized by most authors until 2010, when all of its 30 species were "sunk" into Polyscias subgenus Arthrophyllum.

Arthrophyllum is mostly a genus of shrubs and small to medium trees, but it contains a few large trees, and in New Caledonia, a few lianas, as well. They are noted for their large and apparently leafy inflorescences, up to 1.5 m (4.9 ft) across. The fruit is 1-seeded and the ovary is unilocular. The genus is indigenous to Indomalesia and islands of the southwestern Pacific.

The most widespread and variable of the species is Polyscias jackiana (formerly Arthrophyllum jackianum). Until 2003, it was usually treated as conspecific with Polyscias diversifolia. The New Guinea species Polyscias macranthum can occasionally become quite large and is locally used for lumber.

The four species from New Caledonia were once placed in a separate genus, Eremopanax, distinguished by seeds containing smooth endosperm, versus ruminate endosperm for Arthrophyllum. It was later determined that this character does not clearly distinguish the two genera, and they were united under Arthrophyllum by William Raymond Philipson in 1978, bringing the total number of species up to about 30. For Arthrophyllum in New Caledonia, the taxonomic history is complex, because the species are not clearly distinct, and their circumscription has varied greatly from one author to another.

According to Index Nominum Genericorum, no type species was ever designated for Arthrophyllum. When the former genus Arthrophyllum became part of Polyscias subgenus Arthrophyllum in 2010, Polyscias diversifolia was designated as the type for the subgenus. Polyscias subgenus Arthrophyllum consists of all of the 30 species from the former genus Arthrophyllum, all of the four species from the former genus Kissodendron, and four species already placed in Polyscias.

== Species in Polyscias subgenus Arthrophyllum ==
The following species list is for Polyscias subgenus Arthrophyllum, and is taken from Lowry and Plunkett (2010). For some of the species, the delimitation or the specific epithet is different from that of Frodin and Govaerts (2003). These changes are explained below. The list in the taxobox is for the former genus Arthrophyllum and is from Frodin and Govaerts (2003).

- Polyscias aherniana (Philipson) Lowry & G. M. Plunkett
- Polyscias alternifolia (Maingay ex Ridley) Lowry & G. M. Plunkett
- Polyscias angustifolia (Ridley) Lowry & G. M. Plunkett
- Polyscias ashtonii (Philipson) Lowry & G. M. Plunkett
- Polyscias australiana (F. Mueller) Philipson
- Polyscias bellendenkerensis (F. M. Bailey) Philipson
- Polyscias biforme (Philipson) Lowry & G. M. Plunkett
- Polyscias bipinnata (Gibbs) Philipson
- Polyscias cenabrei (Merrill) Lowry & G. M. Plunkett
- Polyscias collina (Philipson) Lowry & G. M. Plunkett
- Polyscias disperma (F. Mueller) Lowry & G. M. Plunkett
- Polyscias diversifolia (Blume) Lowry & G. M. Plunkett
- Polyscias elliptica (Blume) Lowry & G. M. Plunkett
- Polyscias engganoense (Philipson) Lowry & G. M. Plunkett
- Polyscias havilandii (Ridley) Lowry & G. M. Plunkett
- Polyscias jackiana (G. Don) Lowry & G. M. Plunkett
- Polyscias kjellbergii (Philipson) Lowry & G. M. Plunkett
- Polyscias lucens (Craib) Lowry & G. M. Plunkett
- Polyscias mackeei Lowry & G. M. Plunkett
- Polyscias macranthum (Philipson) Lowry & G. M. Plunkett
- Polyscias macrocarpa (Philipson & Bui) Lowry & G. M. Plunkett
- Polyscias meliifolia (Craib) Lowry & G. M. Plunkett
- Polyscias montana (Ridley) Lowry & G. M. Plunkett
- Polyscias otopyrena (Baillon) Lowry & G. M. Plunkett
- Polyscias pacifica (Philipson) Lowry & G. M. Plunkett
- Polyscias papyracea (Philipson) Lowry & G. M. Plunkett
- Polyscias prolifera (Philipson) Lowry & G. M. Plunkett
- Polyscias pulgarense (Elmer) Lowry & G. M. Plunkett
- Polyscias revoluta (Philipson) Lowry & G. M. Plunkett
- Polyscias royenii Philipson
- Polyscias rubiginosa (Ridley) Lowry & G. M. Plunkett
- Polyscias rufosepala (Ridley) Lowry & G. M. Plunkett
- Polyscias schultzei Harms
- Polyscias stonei (A. L. Lim) Lowry & G. M. Plunkett
- Polyscias thailandica Lowry & G. M. Plunkett
- Polyscias vieillardii (Baillon) Lowry & G. M. Plunkett
- Polyscias willmottii (F. Mueller) Philipson
- Polyscias zippeliana (Miquel) Valeton

== History ==
The genus Arthrophyllum was named by Carl Ludwig von Blume in 1826 in his classic es:Bijdragen tot de flora van Nederlandsch Indië. The name is derived from the Greek arthron, "a joint" and phyllon, "a leaf".

In 1977, William R. Philipson transferred two Australian species, Polyscias bellendenkerensis and Polyscias willmottii into Polyscias from Pentapanax. He found the distinction between Arthrophyllum and Eremopanax to be artificial, and in 1978, he united the two genera under the name Arthrophyllum. In 1979, he covered Araliaceae for Flora Malesiana. In 1995, he covered Araliaceae, except Schefflera, for a flora of New Guinea. His treatment of Arthrophyllum was largely followed in a checklist and nomenclator for Araliaceae that was compiled by Frodin and Govaerts in 2003.

Frodin and Govaerts recognized 30 species in Arthrophyllum. They were not able to determine what Philipson had intended by the name Arthrophyllum maingayi, one of the 17 species that he described for Flora Malesiana. No known specimens, living or preserved, are known to match Philipson's description.

In 2010, a molecular phylogenetic study of the pinnate Araliaceae showed that they could not be divided into genera that could easily be distinguished morphologically. Uncertainties remain about the taxonomy of this group because of a large number of unpublished species and species of uncertain affinities that have never been sampled for DNA. For these reasons, all of the pinnate Araliaceae were assigned to Polyscias, thereby subsuming six genera (Arthrophyllum, Cuphocarpus, Gastonia, Reynoldsia, Munroidendron, and Tetraplasandra) into Polyscias and increasing the number of species in that genus from about 100 to 159.

Lowry and Plunkett (2010) divided the expanded Polyscias (Polyscias sensu lato) into 11 subgenera: Polyscias, Grotefendia, Maralia, Arthrophyllum, Cuphocarpus, Tetraplasandra, Eupteron, Sciadopanax, Tieghemopanax, Indokingia, and Palmervandenbroekia. All of these had been genus names at one time or another. Two of them are often misspelled as "Grotenfendia" and "Palmervandenbrockia". Spelling can be checked at International Plant Names Index, Index Nominum Genericorum, or Tropicos (See External links below).

Polyscias subgenus Arthrophyllum consists of 30 species from the former genus Arthrophyllum, combined with the four species that were in Kissodendron (Polyscias bellendenkerensis, P. bipinnata, P. australiana, and P. disperma), and four species that Frodin and Govaerts had placed in Polyscias (Polyscias royenii, P. schultzei, P. willmottii, and P. zippeliana). Thus Polyscias subgenus Arthrophyllum comprises 38 species.

The circumscription of Kissodendron and its division into species has varied considerably. Frodin and Govaerts (2003) recognized only three species: K. bellendenkeriensis, K. bipinnata, and K. australiana. Lowry and Plunkett (2010) recognized these three, but placed them in Polyscias and split P. australiana, recognizing P. disperma as a separate species. Philipson (1979) had included P. royenii, P. schultzei and P. zippeliana in his Polyscias section Kissodendron, but covered only the Malesian species.

Six species names in Arthrophyllum could not be transferred to Polyscias with the same specific epithet because those epithets were already occupied in Polyscias by the following species: Polyscias balansae (subgenus Tieghemopanax), Polyscias borneensis (subgenus Tetraplasandra), Polyscias crassa (subgenus Indokingia), Polyscias ferruginea (=Polyscias fulva) (subgenus Sciadopanax), Polyscias grandifolia (=Polyscias macgillivrayi) (subgenus Polyscias), and Polyscias javanica (subgenus Polyscias). Because of the existence of these names in Polyscias, Arthrophyllum borneense was transferred to Polyscias as Polyscias aherniana. Philipson had used the name Arthrophyllum ahernianum for this species. Arthrophyllum crassum was renamed as Polyscias revoluta. Arthrophyllum ferrugineum became Polyscias thailandica and Arthrophyllum javanicum became Polyscias elliptica.

The taxonomic history of the New Caledonian members of Polyscias subgenus Arthrophyllum is complex. Ten valid species names and a nomen nudum have been published in Arthrophyllum for this group. Philipson recognized only three species, treating eight of the species names as synonyms for Arthrophyllum otopyrenum. Frodin and Govaerts treated five of these eight names as a fourth species, Arthrophyllum balansae. Lowry and Plunkett (2010) split Arthrophyllum balansae, transferring four of these names to Polyscias as part of Polyscias vieillardii. The fifth name, Arthrophyllum grandifolium, was transferred to Polyscias as Polyscias mackeei.

The only other change of species circumscription by Lowry and Plunkett (2010) was the splitting of Polyscias australiana. They raised one of its subspecies to the rank of species as Polyscias disperma.

== Sources ==
Gregory M. Plunkett, Jun Wen, Porter P. Lowry II, Murray J. Henwood, Pedro Fiaschi, and Anthony D. Mitchell. accepted, undated. Araliaceae, pages ??. In: Klaus Kubitzki (editor); ?? (volume editor). The Families and Genera of Vascular Plants volume ??. Springer-Verlag: Berlin; Heidelberg, Germany. ISBN ??
