= George Campbell Munro =

New Zealand born American botanist, ornithologist and entomologist (1866–1963)

George Campbell Munro (10 May 1866 – 4 December 1963) was a New Zealand born pioneer of Hawaiian botany and ornithology. He settled on a ranch in Lanai and wrote one of the first books on the birds of Hawaii, many species of which are now extinct. The plant genus Munroidendron and the extinct Lanai finch Dysmorodrepanis munroi are named after him.

Munro was born in New Zealand, but little is known of his early life other than that he was a gumdigger collecting kauri tree resin for the varnish industry. He had also trained in taxidermy. He arrived in Honolulu on December 13, 1890 to assist Henry C. Palmer to collect bird specimens for the collection of Lord Walter Rothschild. He then worked on Kauai and Molokai managing a ranch until 1906 collaborating also with R.C.L. Perkins to study local fauna. After a brief visit to New Zealand in 1911 he returned to manage Dole Company’s Lana‘i cattle ranch. He was involved in the founding of the Honolulu Audubon Society in 1939. From 1937 he was involved in bird ringing. He founded the Nalau Arboretum in 1950 while also maintaining endemic plants in Ke Kuaaina. He introduced Cook Island pine trees after noting that they condensed fog and dripped them onto the land. Munro published numerous notes in the journal Elepaio and wrote the Birds of Hawaii (1944, with a second edition in 1960) while a posthumous publication of his notes was included in The Story of Lanai (2007).

The standard author abbreviation G.C.Munro is used to indicate this person as the author when citing a botanical name.
