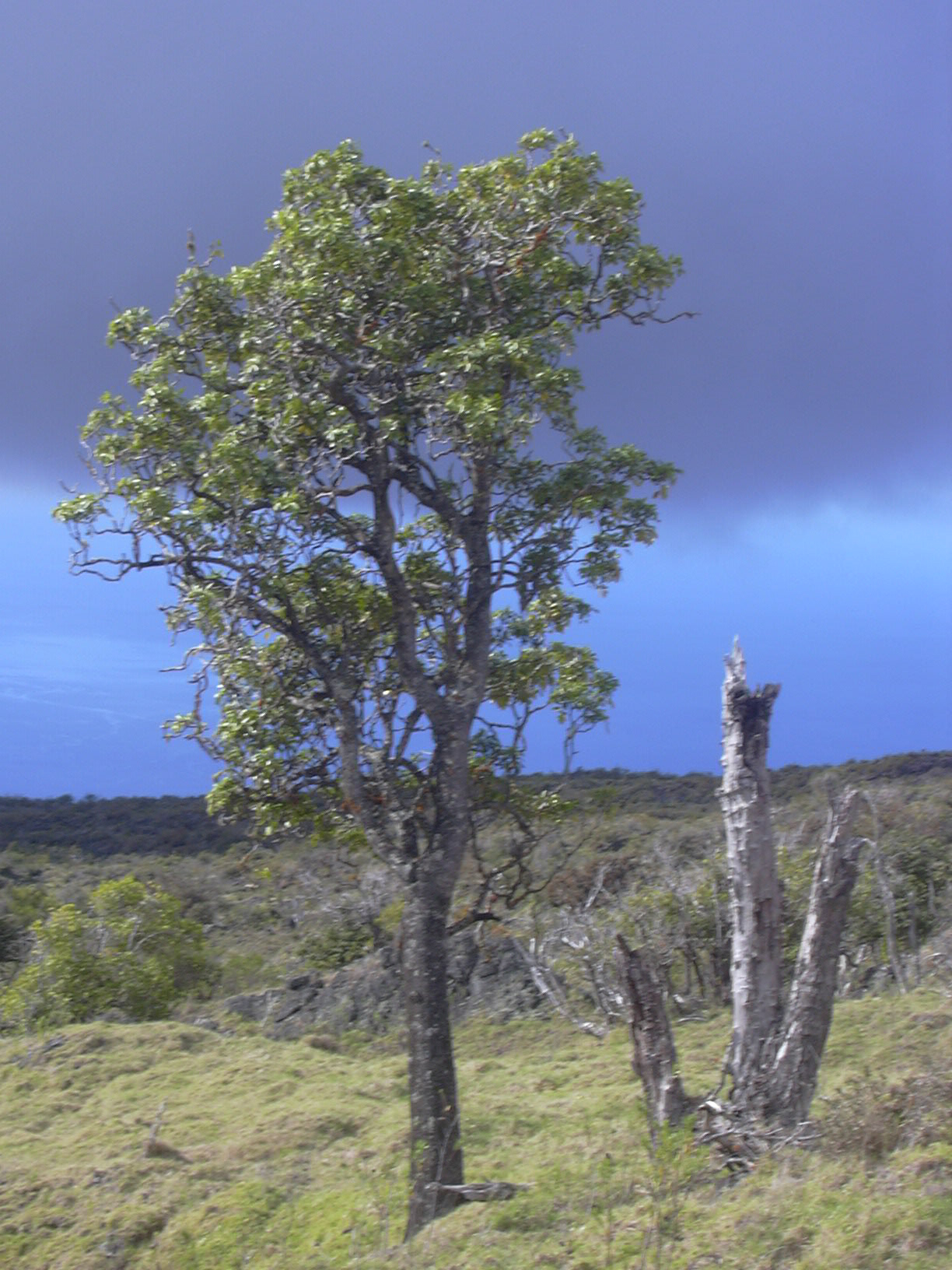

Conservation status
- Vulnerable (NatureServe)

Scientific classification
- Kingdom: Plantae
- Clade: Tracheophytes
- Clade: Angiosperms
- Clade: Eudicots
- Clade: Asterids
- Order: Apiales
- Family: Araliaceae
- Genus: Polyscias
- Species: P. oahuensis

Binomial name
- Polyscias oahuensis (A.Gray) Lowry & G.M.Plunkett

Synonyms
- Gastonia oahuensis A.Gray; Tetraplasandra oahuensis (A.Gray) Harms

= Polyscias oahuensis =

Species of tree

Polyscias oahuensis is a species of tree in the ivy family known by the common name 'ohe mauka. It is endemic to Hawaii, where it occurs on all the major islands except for Niihau and Kahoolawe.

This tree has compound leaves each made up of 7 to 15 dull leaflets. It contains a clear sap. The fruits are black or purple in color and their seeds are dispersed by birds. This was the most variable species of the formerly recognized genus Tetraplasandra.

The tree grows in moist to wet island forests.
