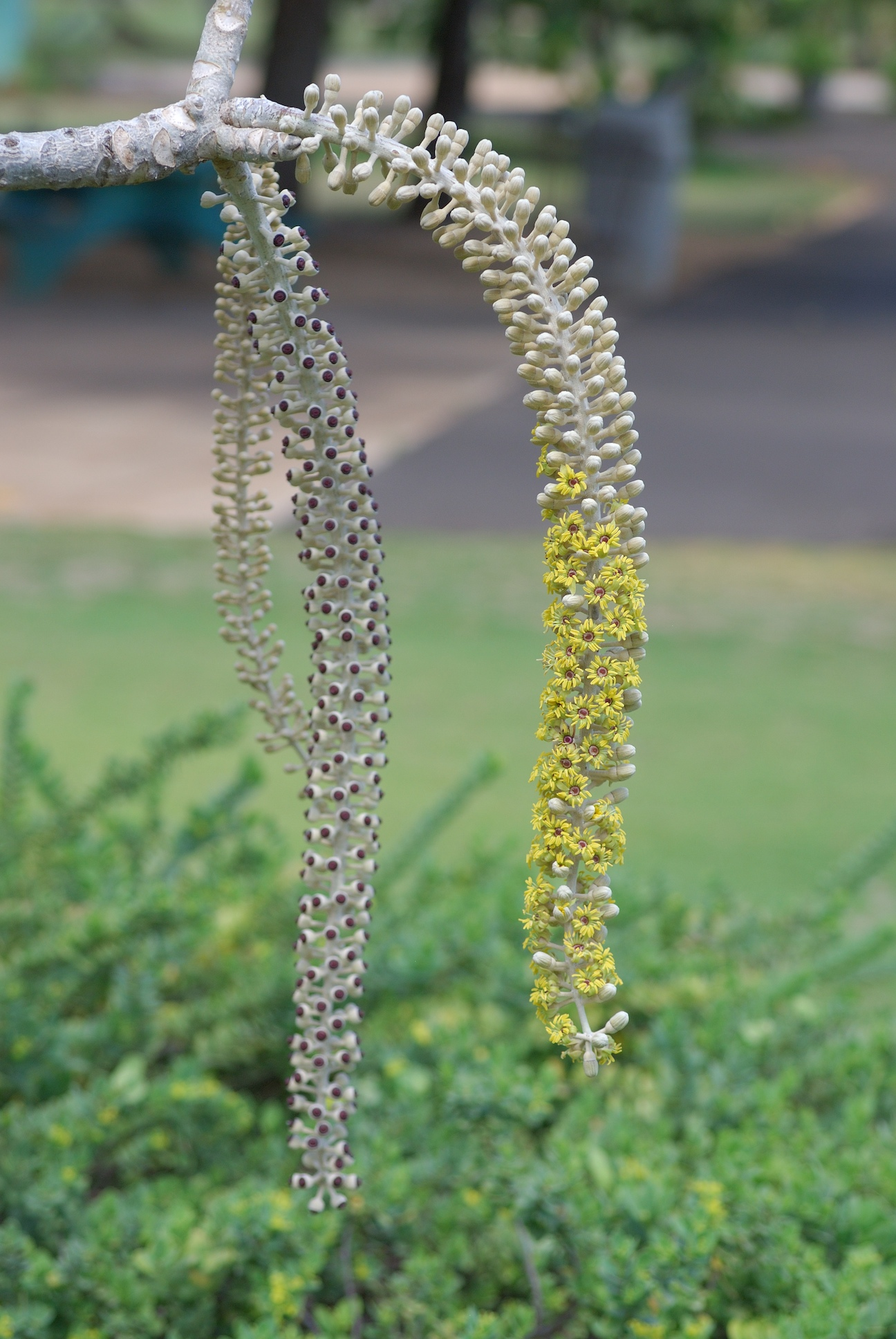
- Polyscias racemosa growing in Maui Nui Botanical Gardens, Maui, Hawaii.

Conservation status
- Critically Endangered (IUCN 3.1)

Scientific classification
- Kingdom: Plantae
- Clade: Tracheophytes
- Clade: Angiosperms
- Clade: Eudicots
- Clade: Asterids
- Order: Apiales
- Family: Araliaceae
- Genus: Polyscias
- Species: P. racemosa

Binomial name
- Polyscias racemosa (C.N.Forbes) Lowry & G.M.Plunkett

Synonyms
- Munroidendron racemosum (C.N.Forbes) Sherff; Tetraplasandra racemosa C.N.Forbes

= Polyscias racemosa =

Species of tree

Polyscias racemosa, or false 'ohe, is a species of flowering plant in the family Araliaceae. As Munroidendron racemosum, the species was until recently considered to be the only species in the monotypic genus Munroidendron. With the change in classification, Munroidendron is now obsolete. Polyscias racemosa is endemic to the Hawaiian island of Kauai. It is very rare in the wild and some of its original habitat has been replaced by sugar cane plantations. It was thought for some time to be probably extinct, but was rediscovered a few years prior to 1967.

Using cladistic methods, phylogenetic studies of DNA have shown that the closest relative of Munroidendron racemosum is Reynoldsia sandwicensis. These two species are now known as Polyscias racemosa and Polyscias sandwicensis, respectively. They are two of the 21 species now placed in Polyscias subgenus Tetraplasandra.

Polyscias racemosa is known in cultivation in Hawaii. Cultivation procedures for Polyscias racemosa have been studied.

== Description ==
Polyscias racemosa is a small tree growing to 7.6 m (25 ft) tall, with a straight trunk, spreading branches, and smooth, grey bark. Like many members of Polyscias, it is sparingly branched and thick-stemmed, with large imparipinnate leaves, but not as extreme in these characteristics as is Polyscias nodosa.

Its leaves are pinnate, 300 mm (12 in) long, with oval leaflets, each of which is over 76 mm (3 in) long. These trees are dry season deciduous, dropping most of their leaves during their summer blooming season. Its small, pale yellow flowers hang in long, rope-like strands. The inflorescence is racemose in form, with up to 250 flowers.

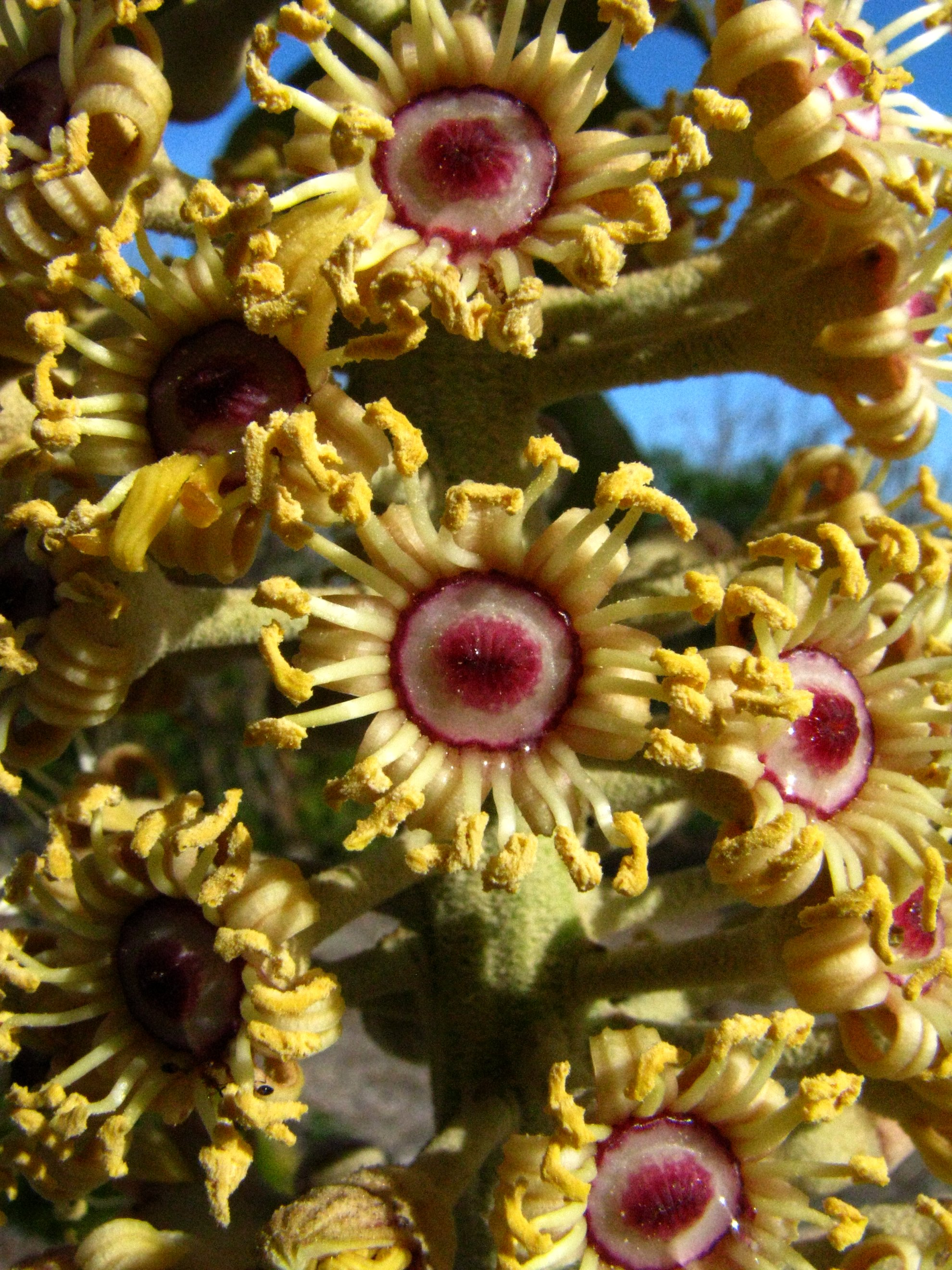
Flowers

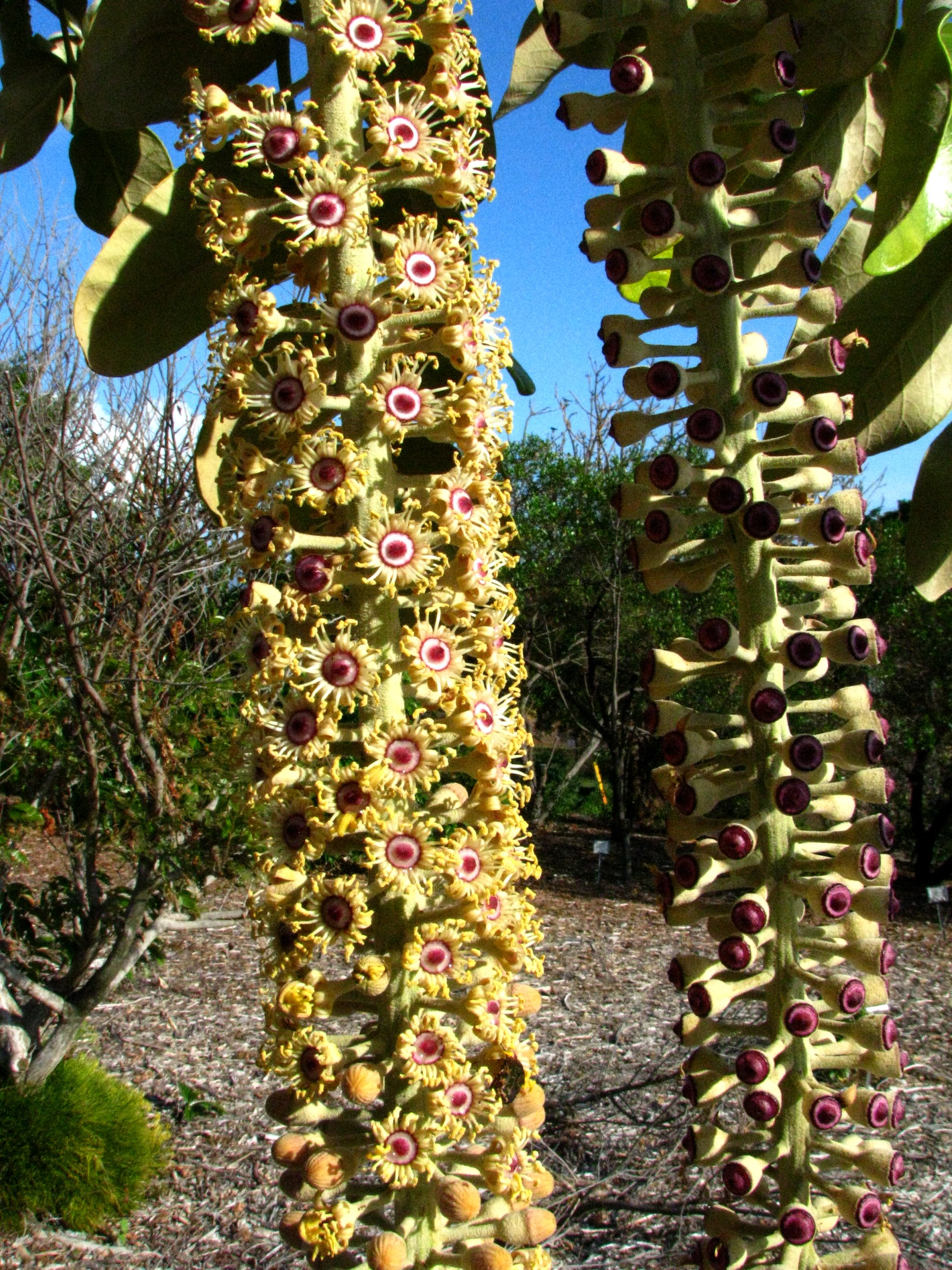
Inflorescence

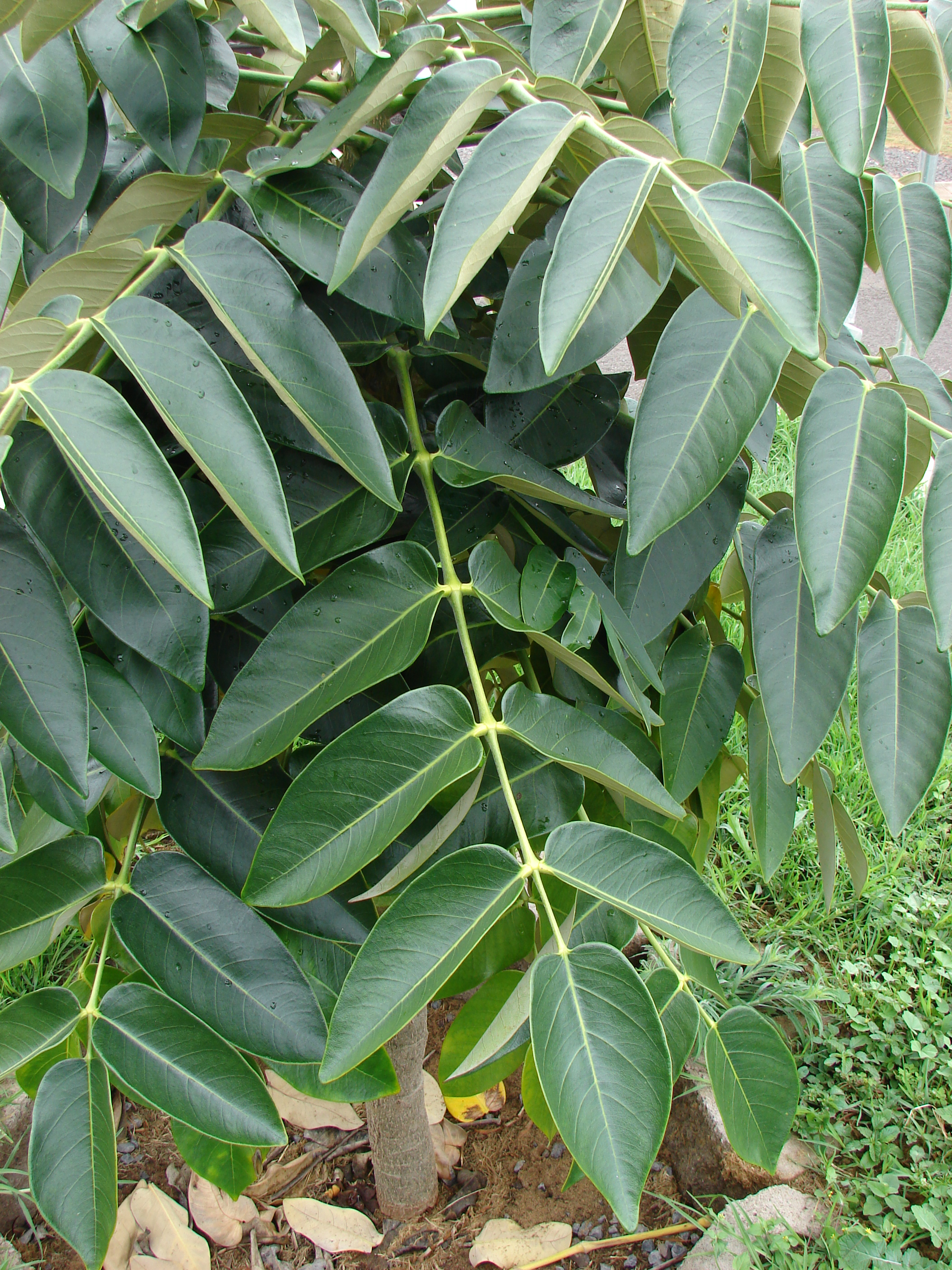
Leaves

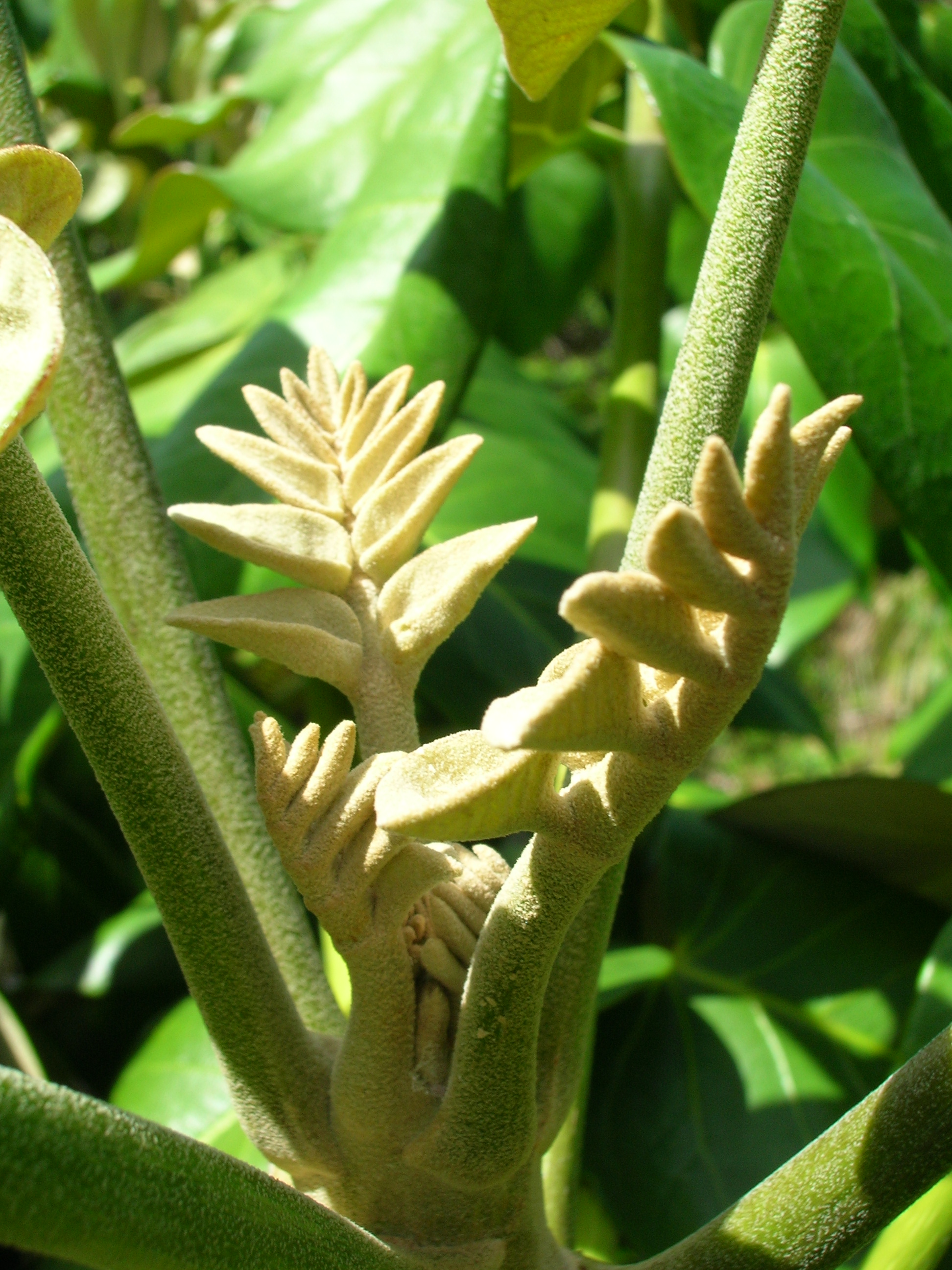
New Leaves

== Habitat and range ==
Polyscias racemosa occurs in coastal mesic and mixed mesic forests at elevations of 120–400 m (390–1,310 ft), where it grows on exposed cliffs and ridges. Associated plant species include papala kepau (Pisonia umbellifera), ʻāwikiwiki (Canavalia galeata), ʻilima (Sida fallax), ʻōlulu (Brighamia insignis), alaheʻe (Psydrax odorata), kōpiko (Psychotria spp.), olopua (Nestegis sandwicensis), ʻahakea (Bobea timonioides), hala pepe (Pleomele aurea), and ʻālaʻa (Planchonella sandwicensis). It occurs naturally in only three locations on Kauaʻi: Nounou Mountain, the cliffs of the Nā Pali Coast, and Haʻupu Ridge near Nāwiliwili Bay.

== History ==
Polyscias racemosa first entered the botanical literature in 1917, when it was described and named as Tetraplasandra racemosa by Charles Noyes Forbes.

Earl Edward Sherff felt that this species was uniquely distinct from the rest of Tetraplasandra, so he erected a new genus for it, Munroidendron, in 1952. The genus was named for George Campbell Munro (1866–1963), described by Umberto Quattrocchi as "a pioneer in Hawaiian ornithology, botany, and horticulture; plant collector in the Hawaiian Islands". Dendron is a Greek word for "tree". Munro was apparently the first collector to see his eponymous genus, Munroidendron.

Sherff separated Munroidendron from Tetraplasandra on the basis of five characters: the absence of umbellules, the arrangement of the flowers in a raceme, the sunken, diamond-shaped pedicel scars, the long persistence of the subtending floral bracts, and the insertion of the stamens in only one whorl, even when numerous. It has been shown that, in spite of its appearance, the inflorescence is not truly a raceme because it is determinate.

Sherff divided the species now known as Polyscias racemosa into three varieties: var. racemosa, var. forbesii, and var. macdanielsii. These have been described as "not sufficiently distinct to be retained".

The establishment of Munroidendron was contentious from the beginning. William R. Philipson said that Munroidendron "comprises a single species with such a distinct inflorescence and corolla that it can well claim generic status. In 1971, a pollen study indicated that Munroidendron might be embedded in Tetraplasandra. This result was not supported by molecular phylogenetic studies based on DNA sequences of nuclear and chloroplast DNA regions. These studies show that Polyscias sandwicensis (formerly Reynoldsia sandwicensis is not most closely related to other species of Reynoldsia, but is sister to Polyscias racemosa, (formerly Munroidendron). This pair is then sister to a monophyletic Tetraplasandra as described by Philipson (1970). This pair of species and the nine species formerly in Tetraplasandra form a clade and comprise all of the Hawaiian species of Polyscias. The 11 species of this "Hawaiian clade" and 10 species from Malesia, Melanesia, and southern Polynesia constitute Polyscias subgenus Tetraplasandra.
