= Polyscias gymnocarpa =

Conservation status
- Critically Endangered (IUCN 2.3)

Scientific classification
- Kingdom: Plantae
- Clade: Tracheophytes
- Clade: Angiosperms
- Clade: Eudicots
- Clade: Asterids
- Order: Apiales
- Family: Araliaceae
- Genus: Polyscias
- Species: P. gymnocarpa

Binomial name
- Polyscias gymnocarpa (Hillebr.) Lowry & G.M.Plunkett

Synonyms
- Pterotropia gymnocarpa Hillebr.; Tetraplasandra gymoncarpa (Hillebr.) Sherff

Species of tree

Polyscias gymnocarpa, commonly known as the Koolau Range 'ohe or Koʻolau tetraplasandra, is a species of flowering plant in the family Araliaceae, that is endemic to the Hawaiian island of Oʻahu. It is threatened by habitat loss.
