= Polyscias bellendenkerensis =

- Young plant on Mt. Bellenden Ker summit

Conservation status
- Vulnerable (NCA)

Scientific classification
- Kingdom: Plantae
- Clade: Tracheophytes
- Clade: Angiosperms
- Clade: Eudicots
- Clade: Asterids
- Order: Apiales
- Family: Araliaceae
- Genus: Polyscias
- Species: P. bellendenkerensis

Binomial name
- Polyscias bellendenkerensis Philipson

Synonyms
- Pentapanax bellendenkeriensis F.M.Bailey; Kissodendron bellendenkeriense (F.M.Bailey) Domin

Species of flowering plant

Polyscias bellendenkerensis is a species of plant in the ivy family Araliaceae, native to northeast Queensland, Australia. It is a small rainforest tree reaching up to 5 m (16 ft) in height. It was first described as Pentapanax bellendenkeriensis in 1900 and transferred to Polyscias in 1977. It has been given a conservation status of vulnerable by the Queensland Government under its Nature Conservation Act..
