= Polyscias pleiosperma =

- Herbarium specimens

Scientific classification
- Kingdom: Plantae
- Clade: Tracheophytes
- Clade: Angiosperms
- Clade: Eudicots
- Clade: Asterids
- Order: Apiales
- Family: Araliaceae
- Genus: Polyscias
- Species: P. pleiosperma

Binomial name
- Polyscias pleiosperma (A.Gray) G.M Plunkett Lowry

Synonyms
- Eschweileria pleiosperma (A.Gray) T.Durand ex Drake; Reynoldsia pleiosperma A.Gray; Trevesia pleiosperma (A.Gray) Benth. & Hook.f. ex Kuntze

Species of flowering plant

Polyscias pleiosperma, formerly placed in the genus Reynoldsia, is a species of flowering tree in the family Araliaceae. It is endemic to Samoa.

== See also ==
- Samoan tropical moist forests
