= Polyscias lionnetii =

Conservation status
- Critically Endangered (IUCN 3.1)

Scientific classification
- Kingdom: Plantae
- Clade: Tracheophytes
- Clade: Angiosperms
- Clade: Eudicots
- Clade: Asterids
- Order: Apiales
- Family: Araliaceae
- Genus: Polyscias
- Species: P. lionnetii

Binomial name
- Polyscias lionnetii (F.Friedmann) Lowry & G.M.Plunkett

Synonyms
- Gastonia lionnetii F.Friedmann

Species of tree

Polyscias lionnetii is a species of plant in the family Araliaceae. It is endemic to Seychelles.
