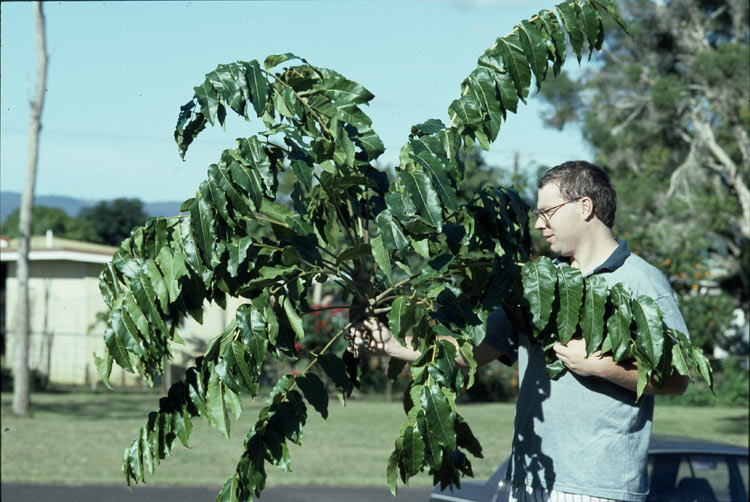
- Foliage

Conservation status
- Least Concern (IUCN 3.1)
- Least Concern (NCA)

Scientific classification
- Kingdom: Plantae
- Clade: Tracheophytes
- Clade: Angiosperms
- Clade: Eudicots
- Clade: Asterids
- Order: Apiales
- Family: Araliaceae
- Genus: Polyscias
- Species: P. spectabilis

Binomial name
- Polyscias spectabilis (Harms) Lowry & G.M.Plunkett

Synonyms
- Gastonia spectabilis (Harms) Philipson; Peekeliopanax spectabilis Harms; Gastonia boridiana Harms

= Polyscias spectabilis =

Species of flowering plant

Polyscias spectabilis is a species of plant in the ivy and ginseng family Araliaceae. It is native to areas from New Guinea to the Solomon Islands and Queensland, Australia.

Each branch blooms once with a terminal inflorescence, but then forms two widely spreading branches just beneath the inflorescence which together resemble the letter "U", giving the tree a unique appearance.
