= Polyscias marchionensis =

Conservation status
- Least Concern (IUCN 2.3)

Scientific classification
- Kingdom: Plantae
- Clade: Tracheophytes
- Clade: Angiosperms
- Clade: Eudicots
- Clade: Asterids
- Order: Apiales
- Family: Araliaceae
- Genus: Polyscias
- Species: P. marchionensis

Binomial name
- Polyscias marchionensis (F.Br.) Lowry & G.M.Plunkett (2010)

Synonyms
- Reynoldsia marchionensis F.Br.

Species of flowering plant

Polyscias marchionensis is a species of plant in the family Araliaceae. It is endemic to the Marquesas Islands of French Polynesia.
