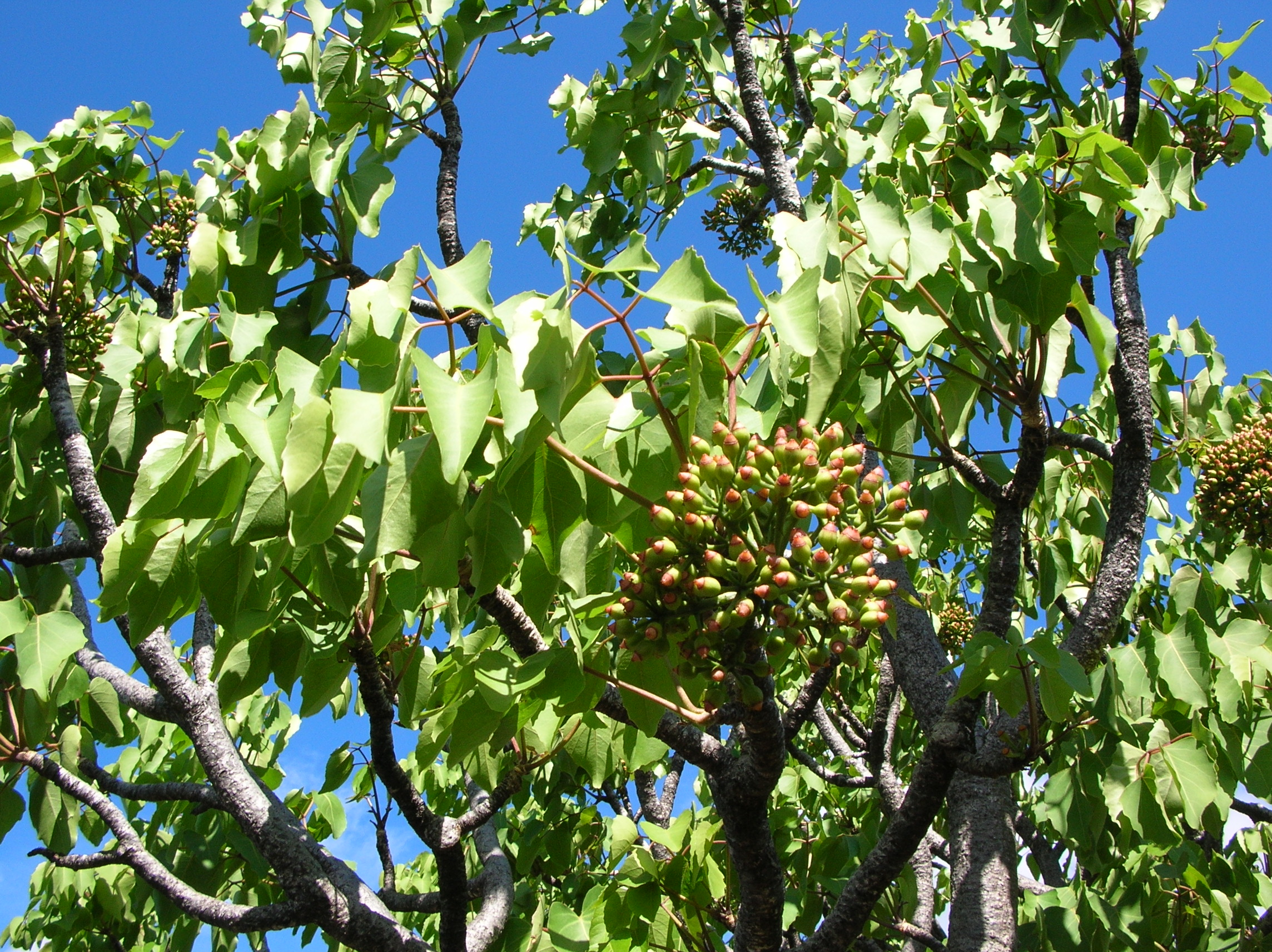

Conservation status
- Near Threatened (IUCN 2.3)

Scientific classification
- Kingdom: Plantae
- Clade: Tracheophytes
- Clade: Angiosperms
- Clade: Eudicots
- Clade: Asterids
- Order: Apiales
- Family: Araliaceae
- Genus: Polyscias
- Species: P. sandwicensis

Binomial name
- Polyscias sandwicensis (A.Gray) Lowry & G.M.Plunkett

Synonyms
- Reynoldsia sandwicensis A.Gray

= Polyscias sandwicensis =

Species of tree

Polyscias sandwicensis (formerly Reynoldsia sandwicensis), known in Hawaiian as the 'ohe makai or ʻOhe kukuluāeʻo, is a species of flowering plant in the family Araliaceae, that is endemic to Hawaii.

It is a Hawaiian dry forest tree, adapted by being deciduous and losing its leaves during the regular summer drought. It reaches a height of 4.6–15 m (15–49 ft) high with a trunk diameter of 0.5–0.6 m (1.6–2.0 ft). It can be found at elevations of 30–800 m (98–2,625 ft) on most main islands. Polyscias sandwicensis generally inhabits lowland dry forests, but is occasionally seen in coastal mesic and mixed mesic forests. It is threatened by habitat loss.
