= Polyscias nodosa =

- Tree with terminal inflorescence

Conservation status
- Least Concern (IUCN 3.1)

Scientific classification
- Kingdom: Plantae
- Clade: Tracheophytes
- Clade: Angiosperms
- Clade: Eudicots
- Clade: Asterids
- Order: Apiales
- Family: Araliaceae
- Genus: Polyscias
- Species: P. nodosa

Binomial name
- Polyscias nodosa (Blume) Seem.

Synonyms
- Aralia nodosa Blume; Eupteron nodosum (Blume) Miq.; Hedera nodosa (Blume) Hassk.; Paratropia nodosa (Blume) DC.; Aralia pendula Blanco; Aralia umbraculifera Roxb.; Hedera umbraculifera Sweet; Paratropia umbraculifera (Roxb.) Wall. ex Voigt; Polyscias floribunda Elmer

Species of flowering plant

Polyscias nodosa is a species of plant in the ivy family Araliaceae, native to eastern parts of Indonesia, New Guinea, the Solomon Islands, and Queensland, Australia. It is a small rainforest tree reaching up to 20 m (66 ft) in height. It was first described as Aralia nodosa in 1826, and transferred to Polyscias in 1865. It has been given a conservation status of least concern by the International Union for Conservation of Nature and by the Queensland Government under its Nature Conservation Act..
