= Polyscias verrucosa =

Conservation status
- Least Concern (IUCN 3.1)

Scientific classification
- Kingdom: Plantae
- Clade: Embryophytes
- Clade: Tracheophytes
- Clade: Angiosperms
- Clade: Eudicots
- Clade: Asterids
- Order: Apiales
- Family: Araliaceae
- Genus: Polyscias
- Species: P. verrucosa

Binomial name
- Polyscias verrucosa (Seem.) Lowry & G.M.Plunkett (2010)

Synonyms
- Eschweileria tahitensis (Nadeaud) T.Durand ex Drake; Reynoldsia tahitensis Nadeaud; Reynoldsia verrucosa Seem.; Trevesia tahitensis (Nadeaud) Drake

Species of flowering plant

Polyscias verrucosa is a species of flowering plant in the family Araliaceae. It is a tree endemic to the island of Tahiti in the Society Islands of French Polynesia. It grows in lowland and montane tropical moist forest. It is listed as a species of "Least Concern" on the IUCN Red List.
