= Cuphocarpus =

Genus of flowering plants

Cuphocarpus is an obsolete genus of flowering plants in the family Araliaceae. Mabberley (2008) treated it as a synonym of Polyscias, but other authors still recognized it at that time. In 2010, in a phylogenetic analysis of DNA sequences, it was shown that Cuphocarpus was biphyletic and embedded in the large genus Polyscias. In an accompanying paper, Polyscias was divided into 11 subgenera, with seven species left incertae sedis.

Since Cuphocarpus is no longer an accepted genus, its species will be referred to herein by their names in Polyscias. Polyscias aculeata is the type species for Cuphocarpus. It is now the sole species in Polyscias subgenus Cuphocarpus. Four other species, formerly in Cuphocarpus, are now in Polyscias subgenus Maralia. All species that have ever been placed in Cuphocarpus are endemic to Madagascar.

Polyscias inermis has been recognized by some authors, but others have regarded it as conspecific with Polyscias aculeata. Polyscias aculeata (sensu lato) is indigenous to the coastal forest of eastern Madagascar. Polyscias briquetiana, Polyscias humbertiana, Polyscias leandriana, and Polyscias compacta (= Cuphocarpus commersonii) are montane species of the Madagascan interior. They were transferred from Cuphocarpus to Polyscias subgenus Maralia in 2010.

Recognizing six species, Frodin and Govaerts (2003) described Cuphocarpus as "shrubs or trees, closely related to Polyscias, but fruits 1-seeded; these latter are moreover surmounted by the persistent calyptroid corolla". René Viguier thought that they were sometimes parthenocarpous.

== History ==
The genus Cuphocarpus was erected by Decaisne and Planchon in 1854. Quattrocchi writes that the name is "from the Greek kyphos "bent, curved, humped" and carpos "fruit"".

Decaisne and Planchon named only one species, Cuphocarpus aculeatus (now Polyscias aculeata). Cuphocarpus inermis (now Polyscias inermis) was added by John Gilbert Baker in 1884. Hermann Harms put both of these in Polyscias in 1898, but his treatment was not followed by others.

In 1966, Luciano Bernardi described four new species in Cuphocarpus. When these were transferred to Polyscias in 2010, Cuphocarpus commersonii was renamed as Polyscias compacta, because the name Polyscias commersonii already existed. The latter is a synonym for Polyscias paniculata, a Madagascan endemic in ''Polyscias'' subgenus Grotefendia. The four species described by Bernardi are now in ''Polyscias'' subgenus Maralia.

In 2003, Frodin and Govaerts stated that Cuphocarpus "is seen as biphyletic". It was confirmed to be so in 2010 in a molecular phylogenetic study of nuclear and chloroplast DNA. Polyscias aculeata (including Polyscias inermis) was resolved as sister to ''Polyscias'' subgenus Sciadopanax, which consists of 13 species from Africa, Madagascar, and nearby islands. Polyscias aculeata was placed in its own subgenus, Polyscias subgenus Cuphocarpus. The four species described by Bernardi are now in ''Polyscias'' subgenus Maralia. This is the largest subgenus of Polyscias and will contain about 115 species, when all of the undescribed species are published. Nearly all of them are restricted to Madagascar.
